= 1918 Birthday Honours =

Appointments and honours by King George V on June 3, 1918

The 1918 Birthday Honours were appointments by King George V to various orders and honours to reward and highlight good works by citizens of the British Empire. The appointments were made to celebrate the official birthday of The King, 3 June and were published in The London Gazette on the same day, followed by a supplement.

The recipients of honours are displayed here as they were styled before their new honour, and arranged by honour, with classes (Knight, Knight Grand Cross, etc.) and then divisions (Military, Civil, etc.) as appropriate.

== United Kingdom and British Empire ==
=== Viscount ===
- The Rt. Hon. Sir John Wynford Philipps, Baron St Davids. For continuous public services in the following capacities: Lord Lieutenant of Pembroke; President of the Pembrokeshire Territorial Force Association; First Chairman of the Flour Mills Control Committee; President of the Organisation for the Employment of Retired Officers.
- The Rt. Hon. David Alfred Thomas, Baron Rhondda. For conspicuous public service as Food Controller, 1917–18.

=== Baron ===
- Sir Matthew Arthur Bt DL by the name, style, and title of Baron Glenarthur, of Carlung, in the county of Ayr
- Sir William James Tatem Bt DL by the name, style, and title of Baron Glanely, of St Fagans, in the county of Glamorgan
- George Denison Faber CB MP by the name, style, and title of Baron Wittenham, of Wallingford, in the county of Berks

=== Privy Councillor ===
The King appointed the following to His Majesty's Most Honourable Privy Council:

- William Adamson MP
- Sir William Bull MP
- John Robert Clynes MP
- Sir Edward Alfred Goulding Bt MP
- Sir Richard Walter John Hely-Hutchinson, Earl of Donoughmore KP
- James Ian Macpherson MP
- Sir Archibald Williamson Bt MP

=== Baronetcies ===
- Sir George Washington Baxter DL JP For public and local services.
- Major Frank Beachim Beauchamp DL For public services.
- John George Butcher KC MP For public and Parliamentary services.
- Guy Calthrop. For public services as Controller of Coal Mines, and as Head of the Department of the Board of Trade which has control of the coal mines of the United Kingdom.
- Sir Edwin Cornwall MP For Parliamentary and public services as Minister for National Health Insurance.
- Robert Leicester Harmsworth MP For Parliamentary and public services.
- Robert McAlpine DL For continuous public and patriotic service for many years in the provision of Workmen's Dwellings and the creation of Garden Cities, and for meritorious war work in the construction of Shell Factories in Scotland and England.
- William James Peake Mason DL For public and local services.
- Colonel Sir Herbert James Francis Parsons. For public and patriotic services.
- Sir Charles Petrie. For public and local services.
- Colonel Edward Pryce-Jones MP DL For public and parliamentary services.
- Robert Thomas. For public services in founding the Welsh Heroes Memorial Fund, and in supporting the British and Foreign Sailors Society and Bangor University.
- Lieutenant-Colonel Rhys Williams DSO KC For public and local services as Chairman of the Quarter Sessions for the last 12 years.

=== Knight Bachelor ===
- Frank Baines CBE MVO For important and valuable services rendered to the Office of Works, Ministry of Munitions, Admiralty, War Office, Air Ministry, and other Departments.
- Harry Baldwin MRCS For service as Dental Surgeon to His Majesty for a number of years and as head of the Kennington Facial Hospital; and also for scientific studies pursued in connection with the War in France.
- James Benjamin Ball. For eminent services as Controller of Timber Supplies since 1917.
- Charles Henry Burge DL For active leadership in local patriotic work.
- Alfred Butt, Theatrical Manager. For generous and useful contributions to War Charities and war work.
- Thomas Octavius Callender DL For active leadership in local patriotic work.
- Colonel Charles Chalmers JP DL For public and local services.
- John Charles Lewis Coward, CBE KC For long continued public services.
- Archibald Davis Dawnay. For local and patriotic services in the extension of allotments, the training of men, and the Chairmanship of War Funds
- Harry Seymour Foster JP DL For public services for many years.
- W.E. Foster FSA For public and local services.
- John Meadows Frost DL For public and local services.
- Walter Matthew Gibson CVO ISO In 1880 he entered the Privy Purse under Queen Victoria, and in 1888 was appointed Secretary of the Privy Purse.
- Park Goff. For services rendered to the Foreign Office during the War, in the course of which he received severe injuries.
- Major Archibald Gilbey Gold JP DL For public and patriotic services.
- James Hacking. For active leadership in local patriotic work.
- John George Harbottle DLFor active leadership in local patriotic work.
- A. G. Jeans, Editor of The Liverpool Post.
- Thomas Lee-Roberts. County Councillor for Bedfordshire. For public and local services.
- John Merry le Sage. Editor of The Daily Telegraph.
- Thomas William Lewis. For services rendered as Stipendiary Magistrate for 20 years, and as Senior Wreck Commissioner.
- R. B. D. Muir. For services rendered as Treasury Counsel
- Peter Peacock. For active leadership in local patriotic work.
- George Peters DL For public and local services.
- John Reid JP DL For public and local services as Director of Glasgow Chamber of Commerce.
- Mayo Robson CVO FRCS For services rendered as Honorary Consulting Surgeon at the King Edward VII Memorial Hospital, Windsor.
- Gerald Walter Roffey. For services rendered in the Ministry of Food since 1917, and as Chairman of the Home-Grown Cereals Committee of the Royal Commission on Wheat Supply.
- Edgar Christian Sanders. For services rendered as Clerk for many years to the Liverpool Justices.
- Ernest Shentall. For public and local services.
- Peter Wyatt Squire. For services rendered as Chemist, for 50 years, to the Royal Family.
- The Rt. Hon. William Alexander Forster Todd DL For public and local services.
- Alfred Warren JP For public and local services.
- Ernest Edward Wild KC For public services.
- Percy Woodhouse DL For public and local services.

British India

- Logie Pirie Watson, Partner in Messrs. Cooper, Allen & Co., Cawnpore, United Provinces, and a Member of the Council of the Lieutenant-Governor for making Laws and Regulations
- Deba Prosad Sarbadhikari CIE Vice-Chancellor, Calcutta University, Bengal
- Nilratan Sarkar Medical Practitioner, Calcutta, Bengal
- Gordon Fraser, Managing Director, Messrs. Best and Co., Ltd. Madras
- Hormasji Ardeshir Wadia, Barrister-at-Law, Bombay
- Robert Aitken, Secretary and Treasurer, Bank of Bombay, Bombay
- Raj Bahadur Seth Sarupchand Hukamchand, Banker, Central India
- Edward Denison Ross CIE Principal of the School of Oriental Studies

=== The Most Noble Order of the Garter ===
==== Knight of the Most Noble Order of the Garter (KG) ====
- Henry John Brinsley Manners, Duke of Rutland

=== The Most Ancient and Most Noble Order of the Thistle ===
==== Knight of the Most Ancient and Most Noble Order of the Thistle (KT) ====
- Brigadier-General John George Stewart-Murray, Duke of Atholl CB MVO DSO

=== The Most Illustrious Order of Saint Patrick ===
==== Knight of the Order of Saint Patrick (KP) ====
- Geoffrey Henry Browne, Baron Oranmore and Browne

=== The Most Honourable Order of the Bath ===
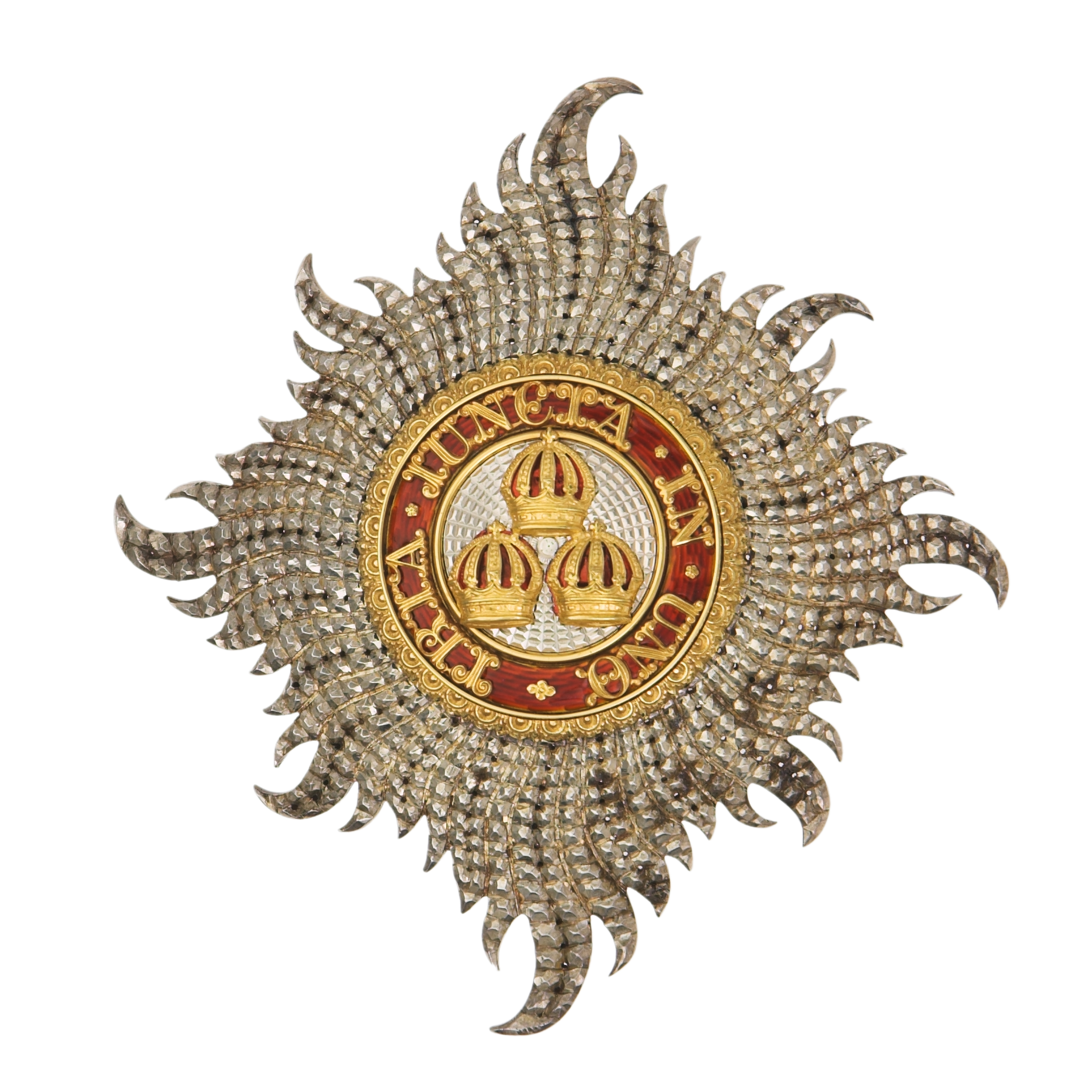
Civilian star of the Knight Grand Cross of the Order of the Bath

==== Knight Grand Cross of the Order of the Bath (GCB) ====
Military Division
Royal Navy

- Vice-Admiral Sir Rosslyn Erskine Wemyss KCB CMG MVO

Army

- General Sir Arthur Arnold Barrett KCB KCSI KCVO ADC General, Indian Army

==== Knight Commander of the Order of the Bath (KCB) ====
Military Division
Royal Navy

- Surgeon-General Humphry Davy Rolleston CB FRCP

Army

For valuable services rendered in connection with Military Operations in France and Flanders —

- Major-General Hugh Sandham Jeudwine CB
- Major-General Colin John Mackenzie CB
- Major-General Reginald John Pinney CB
- Major-General Arthur Binny Scott CB DSO

Canadian Force

- Major-General Henry Edward Burstall CB CMG DSO ADC

Civil Division

- Sir Howard George Frank, Director-General of Lands, War Office, Ministry of Munitions and Air Ministry
- Lieutenant-Colonel The Rt. Hon. Sir Frederick Edward Grey Ponsonby KCVO CB Keeper of His Majesty's Privy Purse, and Extra Equerry to His Majesty

==== Companion of the Order of the Bath (CB) ====
Military Division
Royal Navy

- Capt. The Hon. Hubert George Brand CVO (Commodore, First Class)
- Rear-Admiral Edward Francis Bruen
- Capt. John Ewen Cameron MVO
- Capt. Charles Douglas Carpendale (Commodore, Second Class)
- Capt. Henry Montagu Doughty
- Vice-Admiral Seymour Elphinstone Erskine
- Capt. Cecil Henry Fox
- Surgeon-General Patrick Brodie Handyside
- Deputy Surgeon-General Robert Hill CVO
- Lieutenant-Colonel Alexander Richard Hamilton Hutchison CMG DSO Royal Marine Light Infantry
- Capt. Edward Buxton Kiddle ADC
- Capt. Robert Neale Lawson
- Rear-Admiral James Clement Ley CVO
- Rear-Admiral John Scott Luard
- Lieutenant-Colonel Frederick William Lumsden VC DSO Royal Marine Artillery
- Capt. Crawford Maclachlan
- Capt. Vincent Barkly Molteno
- Paymaster-in-Chief James Elliot Vowler Morton
- Rear-Admiral The Hon. Victor Albert Stanley MVO
- Engineer Capt. William Toop
- Capt. Edwin Veale Underhill
- Capt. Lionel de Lautour Wells CMG (Commodore, First Class)

Army

- Lieutenant-General Sir Herbert Vaughan Cox KCMG CB CSI Indian Army
- Lieutenant-General Havelock Hudson CIE Indian Army
- Colonel Philip John Miles, Indian Army
- Colonel Leslie Waterfield Shakespear, Indian Army
- Lieutenant-Colonel John Blackburn Smith Indian Medical Service
- Colonel Edward Langford Sullivan CMG Indian Army

For valuable services rendered in connection with Military Operations in France and Flanders —

- Temp Major-General Sir Anthony Alfred Bowlby KCMG KCVO FRCS Army Medical Service
- Temp Major-General Cuthbert Sidney Wallace KCMG KCVO CMG Army Medical Service
- Lieutenant-Colonel and Brevet Colonel Fortescue John Nason CMG DSO
- Lieutenant-Colonel and Brevet Colonel Charles Bell Watkins (late Royal Artillery)
- Colonel and Hon. Brigadier-General John Burnard Edwards DSO Labour Corps
- Colonel John Charles Basil Eastwood CMG
- Lieutenant-Colonel and Hon. Colonel Charles William Trotter TD Yeomanry
- Colonel George Barton Smith CMG Army Pay Department
- Colonel Charles Godby CMG Royal Engineers
- Colonel Frederick James Parker
- Lieutenant-Colonel and Brevet Colonel Thomas Wykes Gibbard KHS Army Medical Service
- Colonel Stuart Macdonald CMG Army Medical Service
- Lieutenant-Colonel and Brevet Colonel Allan James Macnab FRCS Indian Medical Service
- Colonel Charles Richard Jebb Griffith CMG DSO Bedfordshire Regiment
- Colonel Thomas Owen Marden CMG
- Lieutenant-Colonel and Brevet Colonel James Hawkins-Whitshed Pollard CMG Royal Scots Fusiliers
- 1st Colonel and Brevet Colonel Frederick Courtenay Longuet Hulton
- Colonel Valentine Murray CMG (late Royal Engineers)
- Colonel Edgar Montague Pilcher DSO FRCS Army Medical Service
- Lieutenant-Colonel and Brevet Colonel William Bain Richardson Sandys CMG Royal Artillery
- Lieutenant-Colonel and Brevet Colonel Richard Ashmore Colley Wellesley CMG Royal Artillery
- Lieutenant-Colonel and Brevet Colonel Philip Gordon Grant CMG Royal Engineers
- Major and Brevet Colonel Gwyn Venables Hordern CMG King's Royal Rifle Corps
- Lieutenant-Colonel and Brevet Colonel Charles Levinge Gregory (Indian Cavalry)
- Major and Brevet Colonel Louis Ridley Vaughan DSO Indian Army
- Lieutenant-Colonel and Brevet Colonel Alexander Edwin de la Voye CMG DSO Army Service Corps
- Lieutenant-Colonel and Brevet Colonel Lyons David Fraser CMG Royal Artillery
- Lieutenant-Colonel and Brevet Colonel Bertram Richard Kirwan CMG Royal Artillery
- Major and Brevet Colonel George Darell Jeffreys CMG Grenadier Guards
- Lieutenant-Colonel and Brevet Colonel William Garnett Braithwaite CMG DSO Royal Welsh Fusiliers
- Colonel George St. Clair Thorn CMG Army Medical Service
- Colonel Frederick Potts CMG Royal Artillery
- Lieutenant-Colonel William Duncan Conabeare Trimnell CMG Army Ordnance Depot
- Major and Brevet Lieutenant-Colonel Charles Lionel Kirwan Campbell CMG Lancers (Since deceased. To date 30 March 1918.)
- Major and Brevet Colonel Kenneth Wigram DSO Gurkha Rifles, Indian Army
- Temp Lieutenant-Colonel Ralph Lewis Wedgwood CMG
- Lieutenant-Colonel and Brevet Colonel Sydney D'Aguilar Crookshank CIE MVO DSO Royal Engineers

Canadian Force

- Major and Brevet Lieutenant-Colonel James Harold Elmsley CMG DSO Royal Canadian Dragoons
- Colonel Huntly Douglas Brodie Ketchen CMG Lord Strathcona's Horse
- Colonel Frederick Oscar Warren Loomis CMG DSO Quebec Regiment
- Victor Wentworth Odlum CMG DSO British Columbia Regiment
- Colonel Robert Rennie CMG MVO DSO Central Ontario Regiment
- Colonel Arthur Edward Ross CMG Canadian Army Medical Corps

Australian Imperial Force

- Colonel Harold William Grimwade CMG
- Colonel Alfred Joseph Bessell-Browne CMG DSO
- Colonel Harold Edward Elliott CMG DSO DCM

For services in connection with the War —

- Major-General Nathaniel Walter Barnardiston MVO
- Colonel Julian Robert John Jocelyn
- Colonel Shafto Longfield Craster CIE Royal Engineers
- Colonel Raymund Crawford, Army Ordnance Depot
- Colonel Bernard Francis Drake
- Colonel Horace Francis Kays
- Colonel Nesbitt Breillat Heffernan, Royal Artillery
- Lieutenant-Colonel and Brevet Colonel Casimir Cartwright van Straubenzee CMG Royal Artillery
- Lieutenant-Colonel and Brevet Colonel Edward Bailey Ashmore CMG MVO Royal Artillery
- Lieutenant-Colonel and Brevet Colonel John Byron, Royal Field Artillery
- Colonel James Douglas McLachlan DSO
- Lieutenant-Colonel and Brevet Colonel William Knapp Tarver, Army Service Corps
- Major and Brevet Colonel Borlase Edward Wyndham Childs CMG Duke of Cornwall's Light Infantry
- Lieutenant-Colonel-and Brevet Colonel Herbert William Studd CMG DSO Coldstream Guards
- Lieutenant-Colonel John Cecil Armstrong CMG Army Pay Department
- Colonel George Bradshaw Stanistreet CMG Army Medical Service
- Temp Lieutenant-Colonel James Leigh-Wood CMG
- Lieutenant-Colonel and Brevet Colonel Charles Edward Wyncoll, late Army Service Corps
- Major Sir Charles Vere Gunning Bt CMG late Durham Light Infantry

Canadian Forces

- Major-General Garnet Burk Hughes, British Columbia Regiment
- Major-General William Alexander Logie
- Colonel Alexander Primrose, Canadian Army Medical Corps

For valuable services rendered in connection with Military Operations in Salonika —

- Major and Brevet Colonel George Norton Cory DSO Royal Dublin Fusiliers
- Lieutenant-Colonel and Brevet Colonel John Duncan CMG DSO Royal Scots Fusiliers
- Colonel Gerald Thomas Rawnsley CMG Army Medical Service

For valuable services rendered in connection with Military Operations in Egypt —

- Temp. Lieutenant-Colonel James William Barrett CMG Royal Army Medical Corps
- Captain and Brevet Lieutenant-Colonel Guy Payan Dawnay CMG DSO MVO late Coldstream Guards
- Major and Brevet Colonel Eric Stanley Girdwood, Scottish Rifles
- Colonel Alfred Ernest Conquer Keble CMG DSO
- Colonel Harry Davis Watson CMG CIE MVO Indian Army

For valuable services rendered in connection with Military Operations on the Indian Frontier (Dated 1 January 1918) —

- Lieutenant-Colonel and Brevet Colonel Hon. Charles Granville Bruce MVO Gurkha Rifles, Indian Army

For valuable services rendered in connection with Military Operations in Italy —

- Colonel Christopher Reginald Buckle CMG DSO Royal Artillery
- Lieutenant-Colonel and Brevet Colonel Thomas Stanton Lambert CMG East Lancashire Regiment
- Lieutenant-Colonel Charles Hamilton Mitchell CMG DSO Central Ontario Regiment

Royal Air Force

- Colonel Arthur Vyell Vyvyan DSO

Civil Division

- Rear-Admiral Owen Francis Gillett
- Capt. Guy Reginald Archer Gaunt CMG RN
- Engineer Capt. William Herbert Beckett RN
- Engineer Capt. Charles William John Bearblock RN
- Capt. Herbert Lyon RNR (Vice-Admiral, retired)
- Colonel Arthur Glanville Tatham, Royal Marine Artillery
- Colonel John Rawdon Hodge Oldfield, Royal Marine Light Infantry
- Commander Ernest Edward Lacy RN
- Fleet Paymaster George Hughlings Armstrong Willis RN
- Commander Hubert George Alston RN
- Lieutenant-Commander Alban Lewis Gwynne RN
- Edward Raoul Bate
- Basil Mott, Member of the War Office Committee on Hutted Camps
- Colonel George Robert Canning, Baron Harris GCSI GCIE TD ADC County Commandant, Kent Volunteer Force, Military Member (late President) Kent Territorial Force Association
- Colonel Robert Cecil Winder DL VD Territorial Force Reserve, Secretary East Lancashire Territorial Force Association
- Sir Hugh Bell Bt H.M. Lieutenant for the North Riding of Yorkshire, President North Riding of Yorkshire Territorial Force Association
- Richard Dalgliesh DL Chairman Leicestershire Territorial Force Association
- Colonel Sir Archibald Mclnnes Shaw DL VD Military Member (late President) City of Glasgow Territorial Force Association
- John Evelyn Shuckburgh, Secretary in the Political Department, India Office
- Lieutenant-Colonel Clive Wigram CSI Equerry and Assistant Private Secretary to His Majesty
- Sydney A. Armitage-Smith, Principal Clerk, Treasury
- Henry W. W. McAnally, Assistant Secretary, Air Ministry
- Edward Howard Marsh CMG Private Secretary to the Minister of Munitions
- Samuel Murray Power, Irish Office
- Capt. Stephen George Tallents, Assistant Secretary in charge of Local Authorities Division, Ministry of Food

In recognition of services in connection with the War —

- John William Stewart Anderson MVO Staff Assistant Secretary, Admiralty
- Henry Heath Fawcett, Director of Army Contracts, War Office
- Arthur Belmore Lowry, Chief Inspector, Local Government Board
- Hugh Malcolm Robinson ISO Chief Inspector of Factories, Home Office
- James Arthur Salter, Director of Shipping Requisitioning, Ministry of Shipping
- Sir Arthur John Tedder, Commissioner of Customs and Excise
- Lieutenant-Colonel Sir William George Eden Wiseman Bt Foreign Office

=== The Most Exalted Order of the Star of India ===
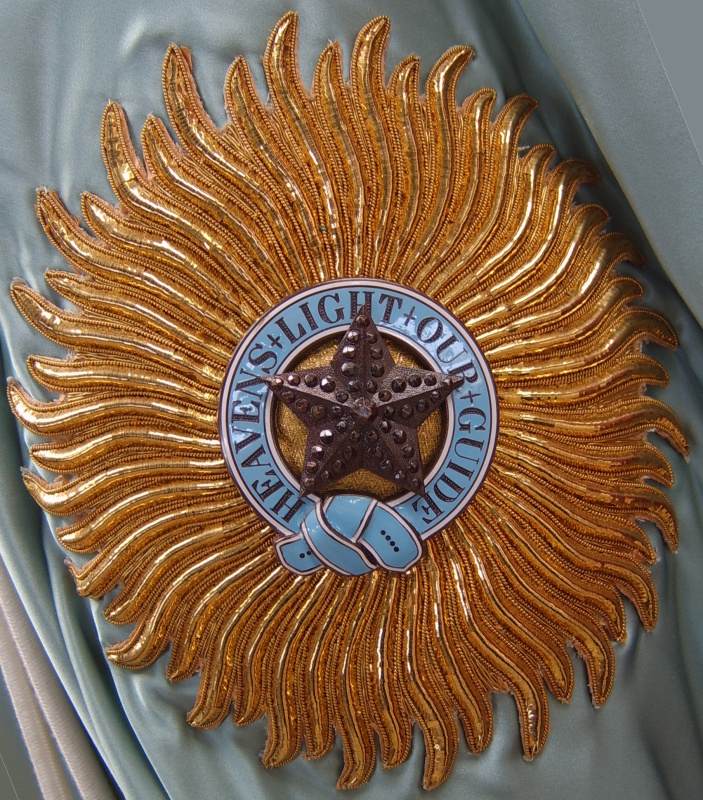
Star of a Knight Grand Commander of the Most Exalted Order of the Star of India

==== Knight Grand Commander (GCSI) ====
- His Excellency The Rt. Hon. Sir John Sinclair, Baron Pentland GCIE Governor of Madras
- His Excellency Sir Freeman Freeman-Thomas, Baron Willingdon GCIE GBE Governor of Bombay

==== Knight Commander (KCSI) ====
- Sir William Henry Hoare Vincent, Indian Civil Service, an Ordinary Member of the Council of the Governor-General of India

In recognition of meritorious services in connection with the War —

- Sir Thomas Henry Holland KCIE FRS President, Indian Munitions Board

==== Companion (CSI) ====
- Henry Staveley Lawrence, Indian Civil Service, Commissioner in Sind, Bombay
- Llewellyn Eddison Buckley, Indian Civil Service, Commissioner of Revenue Settlement, Survey, Land (Records and Agriculture, Board of Revenue, Madras)
- Cecil Henry Bompas, Indian Civil Service, Chairman of the Board of Trustees for the Improvement of Calcutta
- Moses Mordecai Simeon Gubbay CIE Indian Civil Service, Controller of Currency

In recognition of meritorious services in connection with the War —

- Colonel John McNeill Walter CB DSO (to be dated 1 January 1918)
- Major-General Richard Wapshare CB

=== The Most Distinguished Order of Saint Michael and Saint George ===
Star of the Order of Saint Michael and Saint George

==== Knight Grand Cross of the Order of St Michael and St George (GCMG) ====
- The Rt. Hon. Sir George Eulas Foster KCMG Minister of Trade and Commerce of the Dominion of Canada. Representative of Canada on the Royal Commission on the Natural Resources, Trade and Legislation of certain portions of His Majesty's Dominions.
- Sir Owen Cosby Philipps KCMG MP for services to the Dominions and Colonies in connection with Shipping and other matters.

==== Knight Commander of the Order of St Michael and St George (KCMG) ====
- Admiral Sir Lewis Bayly KCB CVO
- Capt. Sir Herbert Acton Blake KCVO RNR
- Professor John Cadman CMG for services in connection with oil-bearing lands in the Colonies.
- Sir Timothy Augustine Coghlan Kt ISO lately Agent-General in London for the State of New South Wales.
- The Hon. John Douglas Hazen Chief Justice of New Brunswick, lately Minister of Marine and Fisheries, and Minister of the Naval Service, Dominion of Canada.
- John Michael Higgins, in recognition of services to the Commonwealth of Australia.
- His Honour Richard Stuart Lake, Lieutenant Governor of the Province of Saskatchewan
- Edward Fancourt Mitchell KC In recognition of services to the Commonwealth of Australia
- Rear-Admiral Hugh Henry Darby Tothill CB
- Charles Alban Young MVO His Majesty's Envoy Extraordinary and Minister Plenipotentiary to, and Consul-General for the Republics of Guatemala, Honduras, Nicaragua and Salvador.

For services rendered in connection with the War —

- Colonel William Heaton Horrocks CB Army Medical Service
- Colonel Henry Cecil Lowther CB CMG CVO DSO MP
- Temp Major-General Sir Berkeley George Moynihan CB
- Temp Colonel Sir Ronald Ross KCB FRS FRCS Army Medical Service
- Colonel Harold Lewis Tagart CB DSO

For services rendered in connection with Military Operations in France and Flanders —

- Hon. Major-General Claude Arthur Bray CB CMG
- Colonel Sir William Boog Leishman Kt CB FRS FRCP
- Surgeon-General Menus William O'Keefe CB
- Major-General Andrew Mitchell Stuart CB

==== Companion of the Order of St Michael and St George (CMG) ====
- The Hon. Aretas Akers-Douglas, First Secretary in His Majesty's Diplomatic Service
- Capt. Forster Delafield Arnold-Forster RN
- Fleet-Surgeon Percy William Bassett-Smith RN CB
- Capt. George Parker Bevan RN DSO (Commodore, 2nd Class)
- Austin Ernest Blount, Clerk of the Senate of the Dominion of Canada
- John William Borden, Accountant and Paymaster-General, Department of Militia and Defence, Dominion of Canada
- Commander Hector Boyes RN
- Colonel George Brand, District Staff Officer in the Orange Free State, South African Defence Force
- Fleet-Surgeon Edward Button RN
- Donald Charles Cameron, Central Secretary, Nigeria
- Fleet-Surgeon Frederick James Abercrombie Dalton RN
- Capt. Leonard Andrew Boyd Donaldson RN
- Capt. Lawrence Leopold Dundas RN
- Benjamin Eastwood, General Manager of the Uganda Railway
- Capt. William Leslie Elder RN
- Thomas Edward Fell, Colonial Secretary of the Island of Barbados
- Henry Lindo Ferguson Professor of Ophthalmology and Dean of the Medical Faculty, University of Otago, Dominion of New Zealand
- The Hon. Tetley Gant, President of the Legislative Council of the State of Tasmania and Chancellor of the University of Tasmania
- Capt. Herbert Neville Garnett RN
- Thomas Gill ISO Under Treasurer of the State of South Australia
- Capt. Robert Woodyear Glennie RN
- Capt. Rupert Stanley Gwatkin-Williams RN
- Fleet-Surgeon David Walker Hewitt RN
- Fleet-Surgeon William Wallace Keir RN
- Rear-Admiral Thomas Webster Kemp CB CIE
- Capt. Theobald Walter Butler Kennedy RN
- George Jardine Kidston, First Secretary in His Majesty's Diplomatic Service
- Adrian Knox KC recognition of services to the Commonwealth of Australia
- Arthur Henry Lemon, British Resident, Negri Sembilan, Federated Malay States
- Major Arthur Greenway Little, Royal Marine Light Infantry
- Herbert William Malkin, Assistant Legal Adviser in the Foreign Office
- Fleet-Paymaster Herbert Stanley Measham RN
- Capt. Raymond Andrew Nugent RN
- Capt. Frederick Owen Pike DSO RNR (Vice-Admiral, retired)
- Josephus Hargreaves Richardson, Commissioner, Government Insurance Department, Dominion of New Zealand
- Fleet-Paymaster Henshaw Robert Russell RN
- Major Richard James Saumarez, Royal Marine Light Infantry
- Capt. Cyril Samuel Townsend RN
- Capt. Cecil Vivian Usborne RN
- Capt. Gerald William Vivian RN
- Engineer-Capt. Henry Wall RN
- Capt. John Fenwick Warton RN
- Fleet-Paymaster Frederick Richard Waymouth RN

==== For services with the war ====
For services rendered in connection with the War

- Captain Donald John Armour, Royal Army Medical Corps
- Major Francis Remi Imbert Athill, Northumberland Fusiliers
- Major Frank Shelston Headon Baldrey FRCVS
- Colonel Colin Robert Ballard CB
- Colonel Sir Hilary William Wellesley Barlow Bt CB
- Quartermaster and Hon. Lieutenant-Colonel James Barry, Remount Serv.
- Colonel Henry Arthur Bethel
- Colonel Frederick Gordon Blair CB ADC Yeomanry
- Colonel and Hon. Major-General Francis George Bond CB (late Royal Engineers)
- Hon. Lieutenant-Colonel Lionel Forbes Bridges, Remount Serv
- Temp Major Joseph William Forster Brittlebank, Army Veterinary Corps
- Major and Brevet Colonel Basil Thorold Buckley, Northumberland Fusiliers
- Major John Dashwood Buller DSO Army Service Corps
- Colonel and Hon. Brigadier-General John Francis Burn-Murdoch CB
- Colonel William Freemantle Cahusac (late Indian Army)
- Colonel Herbert Clement Carey, Colonel Henry Stanhope Sloman DSO
- Lieutenant-Colonel and Brevet Colonel Alexander Hepburne Barrington Cavaye, late Staff
- Captain and Brevet Major Herbert Henry Spender Clay MC (M.P.), late L. Guards
- Major and Brevet Lieutenant-Colonel Jacinth D'Ewes Fitz-Ercald Coke, Army Service Corps
- Lieutenant-Colonel Alfred Fothergill Cooke, Army Pay Department
- Colonel Archibald Crawford
- Lieutenant-Colonel Mordaunt Abingdon Carlisle Crowe, Royal Artillery
- Major and Brevet Lieutenant-Colonel Claude Edward Marjoribanks Dansey, Monmouthshire Regiment
- Lieutenant-Colonel Hon. Horace Scott Davey, Hussars
- Major and Brevet Lieutenant-Colonel Osborne Herbert Delano-Osborne, Royal Scots Fusiliers
- Lieutenant-Colonel Maxwell Earle DSO Grenadier Guards
- Colonel Michael Henry Egan
- Colonel Frederick Baumgardt Elmslie CB
- Colonel Francis Alexander Fortescue CB
- Major and Brevet Lieutenant-Colonel Henry Nedham Foster, Army Service Corps
- Colonel John Fowle CB
- Colonel Edward Hamilton Seymour CB
- Major and Hon. Lieutenant-Colonel Alan Percy George Gough DSO late Royal Welsh Fusiliers
- Major and Brevet Lieutenant-Colonel Walter Harold Gribbon, Royal Lancaster Regiment
- Major and Hon. Lieutenant-Colonel Robert de Bray Hassell, late Res. Artillery (Empld. Remount. Serv.)
- Lieutenant-Colonel Alleyne Haynes, Army Pay Department
- Lieutenant-Colonel Barnard Thornton Hodgson, Royal Sussex Regiment
- Lieutenant-Colonel William Henry Webley Hope, Royal Artillery
- Lieutenant-Colonel Francis Stephen Irvine DSO Royal Army Medical Corps
- Major and Brevet Lieutenant-Colonel Albert Victor Jenner DSO late Rifles Brigade
- Colonel Sir Charles Wallis King Kt CB MVO
- Lieutenant-Colonel and Brevet Colonel Morton Herbert Knaggs, Army Ordnance Depot
- Lieutenant-Colonel and Brevet Colonel William Bernard Lauder, Army Pay Department
- Lieutenant-Colonel Sir Arthur Leetham Kt Retired, Royal Engineers
- Lieutenant-Colonel Stratford Edward St. Leger DSO Royal Irish Regiment
- Major and Brevet Lieutenant-Colonel Clive Gerard Liddell DSO Leicestershire Regiment
- Temp Lieutenant-Colonel James Fraser Liste Royal Engineers
- Lieutenant-Colonel Charles Hawker Liveing DSO Royal Artillery
- Major and Brevet Lieutenant-Colonel Clarence Reginald Macdonald, Royal Warwickshire Regiment
- Colonel Douglas Lilburn MacEwen CB
- Lieutenant-Colonel Richard Oliver Marton DSO Royal Garrison Artillery
- Major Ralph Micklem, Royal Engineers
- Lieutenant-Colonel and Brevet Colonel Hill Godfrey Morgan CB DSO (late Army Service Corps)
- Major Charles David Murray
- Lieutenant-Colonel Andrew Bellew Nolan, Army Pay Department
- Major and Brevet Lieutenant-Colonel Gordon Ogilvie, Royal Artillery
- Captain and Brevet Major Laurie Charles Frith Oppenheim (late Dragoon Guards), Highland Light Infantry
- Temp Lieutenant-Colonel Herbert Watkins Pitchford, Army Veterinary Corps
- Major Thomas Andrew Poison, empld. Army Ordnance Depot
- Major and Brevet Lieutenant-Colonel John James Porteous (late Royal Artillery), Remount Serv
- Lieutenant-Colonel and Brevet Colonel Arthur Spencer Pratt CB (late Royal Artillery), Remount Serv
- Major Frederick Kaye Puckle, Army Service Corps
- Colonel Herman Le Roy-Lewis CB DSO
- Major and Brevet Lieutenant-Colonel Edward Carew Sanders DSO (late Royal Artillery) Remount Directorate
- Lieutenant-Colonel and Brevet Colonel Charles Inglis Scott, Army Pay Department
- Colonel William Apsley-Smith CB
- Temp Lieutenant-Colonel Arthur Smithells
- Colonel Richard John Strachey
- Lieutenant-Colonel Sir Henry Beaufoy Thornhill KCIE Indian Army
- Major and Brevet Lieutenant-Colonel Herbert William Todhunter, King's Own Scottish Borderers
- Lieutenant-Colonel Ralph Douglas Turton, Military Detention Barracks
- Major and Brevet Lieutenant-Colonel Walter King Venning MC Duke of Cornwall's Light Infantry
- Lieutenant-Colonel Robert Austen Vigne, Royal Artillery
- Major and Brevet Lieutenant-Colonel John Bayford Wells DSO North Lancashire Regiment
- Temp Major Ernest Arthur Weston, Royal Engineers, Inland Waterways and Docks
- Lieutenant-Colonel Frederick Ernest Whitton, Leinster Regiment
- Colonel Henry David Williams
- Lieutenant-Colonel George Mostyn Williams, Army Veterinary Corps
- Temp Lieutenant-Colonel Sir William George Eden Wiseman Bt
- Temp Colonel Arthur Stanley Woodwork Army Medical Service
- Lieutenant-Colonel Harry Stevenson Wright, Army Service Corps

Canadian Force

- Temp Major-General Sir Anthony Alfred Bowlby KCMG KCVO FRCS Army Medical Service
- Lieutenant-Colonel and Brevet Colonel William Garnett Braithwaite CMG DSO Royal Welsh Fusiliers
- Major and Brevet Lieutenant-Colonel Charles Lionel Kirwan Campbell CMG Lancers (Since deceased. To date 30 March 1918.)
- Lieutenant-Colonel and Brevet Colonel Sydney D'Aguilar Crookshank CIE MVO DSO Royal Engineers
- Colonel John Charles Basil Eastwood CMG
- Colonel and Hon. Brigadier-General John Burnard Edwards DSO Labour Corps
- Lieutenant-Colonel and Brevet Colonel Lyons David Fraser CMG Royal Artillery
- Lieutenant-Colonel and Brevet Colonel Thomas Wykes Gibbard KHS Army Medical Service
- Colonel Charles Godby CMG Royal Engineers
- Lieutenant-Colonel and Brevet Colonel Philip Gordon Grant CMG Royal Engineers
- Lieutenant-Colonel and Brevet Colonel Charles Levinge Gregory Indian Cavalry
- Colonel Charles Richard Jebb Griffith CMG DSO Bedfordshire Regiment
- Major and Brevet Colonel Gwyn Venables Hordern CMG King's Royal Rifle Corps
- 1st Colonel and Brevet Colonel Frederick Courtenay Longuet Hulton
- Major and Brevet Colonel George Darell Jeffreys CMG Grenadier Guards
- Lieutenant-Colonel and Brevet Colonel Bertram Richard Kirwan CMG Royal Artillery
- Colonel Stuart Macdonald CMG Army Medical Service
- Lieutenant-Colonel and Brevet Colonel Allan James Macnab FRCS Indian Medical Service
- Colonel Thomas Owen Marden CMG
- Colonel Valentine Murray CMG (late Royal Engineers)
- Lieutenant-Colonel and Brevet Colonel Fortescue John Nason CMG DSO
- Colonel Frederick James Parker
- Colonel Edgar Montague Pilcher DSO FRCS Army Medical Service
- Lieutenant-Colonel and Brevet Colonel James Hawkins Whitshed Pollard CMG Royal Scots Fusiliers
- Colonel Frederick Potts CMG Royal Artillery
- Lieutenant-Colonel and Brevet Colonel William Bain Richardson Sandys CMG Royal Artillery
- Colonel George Barton Smith CMG Army Pay Department
- Colonel George St. Clair Thorn CMG Army Medical Service
- Lieutenant-Colonel William Duncan Conabeare Trimnell CMG Army Ordnance Depot
- Lieutenant-Colonel and Hon. Colonel Charles William Trotter TD Yeomanry
- Major and Brevet Colonel Louis Ridley Vaughan DSO Indian Army
- Lieutenant-Colonel and Brevet Colonel Alexander Edwin de la Voye CMG DSO Army Service Corps
- Temp Major-General Cuthbert Sidney Wallace CMG Army Medical Service
- Lieutenant-Colonel and Brevet Colonel Charles Bell Watkins (late Royal Artillery)
- Temp Lieutenant-Colonel Ralph Lewis Wedgwood CMG
- Lieutenant-Colonel and Brevet Colonel Richard Ashmore Colley Wellesley CMG Royal Artillery
- Major and Brevet Colonel Kenneth Wigram DSO Gurkha Rifles, Indian Army

Australian Force

- Major Harry Smalley Evans, Australian Army Pay Corps

New Zealand Force

- Lieutenant-Colonel John Alexander MacKenzie, Otago Regiment
- Lieutenant-Colonel Cyril Hocken Tewsley, N.Z. Medical Corps

Newfoundland Contingent

- Major Cluny Macpherson Royal Newfoundland Regiment

In recognition of distinguished services rendered in connection with the War —

- Major Ralph Kirby Bagnall-Wild RAF
- Lieutenant-Colonel Bertie Clephane Hawley Drew RAF
- Lieutenant-Colonel Cuthbert Gurney Hoare RAF
- Lieutenant-Colonel Alfred Huggins DSO RAF
- Major Charles Frederick Lee RAF
- Lieutenant-Colonel John Cyril Porte RAF
- Lieutenant-Colonel William Ward Warner RAF

In recognition of distinguished service in the theatre of War —

- Lieutenant-Colonel John Harold Whitworth Becke DSO RAF

For services rendered in connection with Military Operations in Salonika —

- Major and Brevet Lieutenant-Colonel William Alan Blake DSO Wiltshire Regiment
- Major and Brevet Lieutenant-Colonel Alexander Henry Watkins Grubb DSO Royal Engineers
- Lieutenant-Colonel Brian John Michael Luck DSO Royal Garrison Artillery
- Major and Brevet Lieutenant-Colonel Alexander Duncan Macpherson DSO Cameron Highlanders
- Lieutenant-Colonel and Brevet Colonel Charles Henry Macintire-Hitchins, (late Indian Army), Labour-Corps
- Major and Brevet Colonel Charles Clarkson Martin Maynard DSO Devonshire Regiment
- Major and Brevet Lieutenant-Colonel Richard Elles Solly-Flood DSO Rifle Brigade
- Major and Brevet Lieutenant-Colonel Charles-George Woodburn Hunter DSO Royal Engineers
- Major and Brevet Lieutenant-Colonel Bertram Fitzherbert Widdrington DSO King's Royal Rifle Corps
- Major and Brevet Lieutenant-Colonel Ernest Douglas Young, Devonshire Regiment

For services rendered with the British Forces on the Mediterranean Line of Communications —

- Temp. Colonel George Lethbridge Colvin DSO
- Temp. Major Wulff Henry Grey CB Royal Engineers

For services rendered in connection with Military Operations on the Indian Frontier (Dated 1 January 1918)

- Colonel Charles Camac Luard

For valuable services rendered in connection with Military Operations in Italy —

- Major and Brevet Lieutenant-Colonel Baptist Barton Crozier DSO Royal Artillery
- Lieutenant-Colonel Robert Henry Frederick McCulloch DSO Royal Garrison Artillery
- Major and Brevet Lieutenant-Colonel Gordon Charles William Gordon-Hall DSO King's Own Yorkshire Light Infantry
- George Herbert Leonard Hammerton DSO Royal Army Medical Corps
- Lieutenant-Colonel and Brevet Colonel Arthur Blois Ross Hildebrand DSO Royal Engineers
- Major and Brevet Lieutenant-Colonel Bertram John Lang DSO Argyll & Sutherland Highlanders
- Colonel Eric Pearce-Serocold, King's Royal Rifle Corps
- Lieutenant-Colonel and Brevet Colonel William Strong CB Royal Artillery
- Lieutenant-Colonel The Hon. Maurice Anthony Wingfield DSO Rifle Brigade

For services rendered in connection with Military Operations in France and Flanders —

- Lieutenant-Colonel Robert Berkeley Airey DSO Army Service Corps
- Lieutenant-Colonel William Henry Lorraine Allgood DSO
- Major Frederick Henry Allhusen DSO Yeomanry
- Lieutenant Colonel and Brevet Colonel Austin Thomas Anderson, Royal Artillery
- Lieutenant-Colonel Rowland James Percy Anderson DSO Hussars
- Major and Brevet Lieutenant-Colonel Charles Clement Armitage, Royal Artillery
- Major Edward Armstrong DSO Highland Light Infantry
- Lieutenant-Colonel John Maurice Arthur DSO Royal Engineers
- Major and Brevet Lieutenant-Colonel Vivian Telford Bailey DSO Liverpool Regiment
- Temp Lieutenant-Colonel Edward Metcalfe Beall DSO Liverpool Regiment
- Lieutenant-Colonel Alfred Bryan Bethell DSO Royal Field Artillery
- Captain and Brevet Lieutenant-Colonel Hugh Keppel Bethell DSO Hussars
- Lieutenant-Colonel William Richard Blackwell, Royal Army Medical Corps
- Major and Brevet Lieutenant-Colonel Oswald Cuthbert Borrett DSO Royal Lancaster Regiment
- Major and Brevet Lieutenant-Colonel Alan Brough DSO Royal Engineers
- Lieutenant-Colonel Claud Lorn Campbell-Hamilton DSO Royal Artillery
- Lieutenant-Colonel and Brevet Colonel George Gias Sandeman Carey CB Royal Artillery
- Major and Brevet Lieutenant-Colonel Charles Murray Carpenter DSO Royal Engineers
- Captain Sydney Herbert Charrington DSO Tank Battalion, late Hussars
- LieutenantColonel Sir Smith Hill Child Bt MVO DSO Royal Field Artillery
- Lieutenant-Colonel William Ellis Clark DSO Royal Artillery
- Major and Brevet Lieutenant-Colonel Bertie Gordon Clay DSO Dragoon Guards
- Colonel Robert William Clements DSO
- Major and Brevet Lieutenant-Colonel John Francis Stanhope Duke Coleridge DSO Gurkha Rifles, Indian Army
- Lieutenant-Colonel Harold Collinson DSO FRCS Royal Army Medical Corps
- Lieutenant Colonel Arthur Edward Osmond Congdon, Royal Munster Fusiliers
- Lieutenant-Colonel George Trevor-Roper Cook DSO Hussars
- Colonel John Francis Craig, late Royal Artillery
- Major and Brevet Lieutenant-Colonel Claude Raul Champion de Crespigny DSO Grenadier Guards
- Major and Brevet Lieutenant-Colonel Francis Henry Dansey DSO Wiltshire Regiment
- Lieutenant-Colonel Archibald James Ferguson Eden DSO Oxfordshire & Buckinghamshire Light Infantry
- Major and Brevet Lieutenant-Colonel Gilbert Charles Edward Elliott DSO Royal Engineers
- Lieutenant-Colonel William Evans DSO Royal Artillery
- Major and Brevet Lieutenant-Colonel Harold Mynors Farmar DSO Lancashire Fusiliers
- Lieutenant-Colonel Arthur Baron Florman DSO Royal Horse Artillery
- Lieutenant-Colonel George Norman Bowes Forster DSO Royal Warwickshire Regiment
- Major and Brevet Colonel Gilbert Robertson Frith DSO Royal Engineers
- Lieutenant-Colonel James Stuart Gallic DSO Army Medical Service
- Major Reynold Alexander Gillam DSO Royal Engineers
- Lieutenant-Colonel and Brevet Colonel Godfrey Gillson DSO Royal Artillery
- Lieutenant-Colonel William Fanshawe London Gordon DSO Norfolk Regiment
- Lieutenant-Colonel Thomas Arthur Granger Indian Medical Service
- Major and Temp Colonel Henry McIlree Williamson Gray CB FRCS Royal Army Medical Corps
- Brevet Lieutenant-Colonel Christopher Joseph Griffin DSO Lancashire Fusiliers
- Lieutenant-Colonel Gwyn Gwyn-Thomas DSO Indian Army
- Lieutenant-Colonel Albert Ernest Hamerton DSO Royal Army Medical Corps
- Lieutenant-Colonel Alexander Ramsay Harman DSO Worcestershire Regiment
- Lieutenant-Colonel James Andrew Hartigan DSO Royal Army Medical Corps
- Captain and Brevet Major Otway Charles Herbert MC Argyll & Sutherland Highlanders
- Temp Major Frederick Thomas George Hobday FRCVS Army Veterinary Corps
- Major and Brevet Lieutenant-Colonel Clarence John Hobkirk DSO Essex Regiment
- Major and Brevet Colonel Archibald Fraser Home DSO Hussars
- Major The Hon. Neville Albert Hood DSO Royal Artillery
- Major and Brevet Lieutenant-Colonel The Hon. Christian Malise Hore-Ruthven DSO Royal Highlanders
- Colonel Wilfred Edward Hudleston DSO Army Medical Service
- Major Hugh Moore Hutchinson DSO Connaught Rangers
- Brevet Lieutenant-Colonel Alfred Ernest Irvine DSO Durham Light Infantry
- Major and Brevet Lieutenant-Colonel Evan Maclean Jack DSO Royal Engineers Brevet
- Lieutenant-Colonel John Darnley Ingles DSO Devonshire Regiment
- Temp and Hon. Major Charles George Jarvis LRCP Royal Army Medical Corps
- Major and Brevet Colonel George Napier Johnston DSO Royal Artillery
- Lieutenant-Colonel and Brevet Colonel Geoffrey Chicheley Kemp CB Royal Engineers
- Major and Brevet Lieutenant-Colonel Henry Brewster Percy Lion Kennedy DSO King's Royal Rifle Corps
- Major and Brevet Lieutenant-Colonel John Kennedy DSO Argyll & Sutherland Highlanders
- Lieutenant-Colonel and Brevet Colonel Carleton Hooper Morrison Kirkwood DSO Wiltshire Regiment
- Colonel Edward Parry Lambert CB
- Lieutenant-Colonel Penton Shakespear Lowis DSO Royal Garrison Artillery
- Major and Brevet Lieutenant Colonel Cuthbert Henry Tindall Lucas DSO Royal Berkshire Regiment
- Major and Brevet Lieutenant-Colonel Russell Mortimer Luckock, Royal Lancaster Regiment
- Temp Lieutenant-Colonel David Lyell DSO Royal Engineers
- Major and Brevet Lieutenant-Colonel Conwyn Mansel-Jones VC DSO West Yorkshire Regiment
- Major and Brevet Lieutenant-Colonel Gerald Hamilton Martin DSO King's Royal Rifle Corps
- Major and Brevet Lieutenant-Colonel Arthur Edward McNamara DSO Royal West Surrey Regiment
- Major Godfrey Meynell, Shropshire Light Infantry
- Major Cecil Buckley Morgan DSO Durham Light Infantry
- Lieutenant-Colonel Edward Maudsley Morphew DSO Royal Army Medical Corps
- Lieutenant-Colonel Frederick Blundell Moss-Blundell DSO Royal Field Artillery
- Major and Brevet Lieutenant-Colonel Henry Needham DSO Gloucestershire Regiment
- Major and Brevet Lieutenant-Colonel Octavius Henry Lothian Nicholson DSO West Yorkshire Regiment
- Major and Brevet Lieutenant-Colonel Walter Norris Nicholson DSO Suffolk Regiment
- Major and Brevet Lieutenant-Colonel George de la Poer Beresford Pakenham DSO Border Regiment
- Lieutenant-Colonel Cyril Eustace Palmer DSO Royal Artillery
- Colonel Thomas Tait Pitman CB
- Major George Chambers Pollard DSO Royal Engineers
- Major and Brevet Lieutenant-Colonel Cyril Lachlan Porter DSO East Kent Regiment
- Major Edmund Thurlow Potts DSO Royal Army Medical Corps
- Major and Brevet Lieutenant-Colonel George Arthur Paget Rennie DSO King's Royal Rifle Corps
- Temp Colonel Owen William Richards DSO FRCS LRCP Royal Army Medical Corps
- Temp Captain Wilfrid Stanley Richmond, Royal Engineers
- Major and Brevet Lieutenant-Colonel Arthur Murray Ross DSO West Yorkshire Regiment
- Colonel Cecil Henry de Rougemont CB MVO DSO
- Major and Brevet Lieutenant-Colonel Eugene Ryan DSO Royal Army Medical Corps
- Major and Brevet Lieutenant-Colonel Jonathan William Shirley Sewell, RTE
- Major Basil Heron Shaw-Stewart DSO Royal Field Artillery
- Lieutenant-Colonel John Joseph Shute DSO TD Liverpool Regiment
- Major Maurice Sinclair Royal Army Medical Corps
- Captain and Brevet Lieutenant Colonel The Hon. Ferdinand Charles Stanley DSO Grenadier Guards
- Major William Lawrence Steele, Royal Army Medical Corps
- Lieutenant-Colonel and Brevet Colonel Edward Hall Stevenson DSO Royal Artillery
- Major and Brevet Lieutenant-Colonel Percy Vere Powys Stone DSO Norfolk Regiment
- Lieutenant-Colonel Clement Arthur Sykes DSO Royal Artillery
- Major and Brevet Lieutenant-Colonel Ernest Napper Tandy DSO Royal Artillery
- Major and Brevet Lieutenant-Colonel Reginald O'Bryan Taylor CIE Indian Cavalry
- Major and Brevet Lieutenant-Colonel Roger Stephen Tempest DSO Scots Guards
- Lieutenant-Colonel Albert George Thompson DSO Royal Army Medical Corps
- Major and Brevet Lieutenant-Colonel Richard Lovell Brereton Thompson DSO Royal Engineers
- Colonel William David Thomson, Indian Army
- Lieutenant-Colonel Noel Arbuthnot Thomson DSO Seaforth Highlanders
- Major Leslie Heber Thornton DSO Rifle Brigade
- Major Hew Wakeman Tompson, Hampshire Regiment
- Lieutenant-Colonel George Strangways Tovey DSO Royal Artillery
- Temp Lieutenant-Colonel Ralph Brunton Umfreville DSO Gloucestershire Regiment
- Major and Brevet Lieutenant-Colonel Valentine Vivian DSO MC Grenadier Guards
- Major and Brevet Lieutenant-Colonel Cyril Mosley Wagstaff CIE DSO Royal Engineers
- Major and Brevet Lieutenant-Colonel Henry Alexander Walker DSO Royal Fusiliers
- Major and Brevet Lieutenant-Colonel Richard Knox Walsh DSO Royal Scots Fusiliers
- Lieutenant-Colonel Edward Charles Walthall Delves Walthall DSO Royal Artillery
- Lieutenant-Colonel Philip Wheatley DSO Royal Artillery
- Major and Brevet Lieutenant-Colonel Leonard Lane Wheatley DSO Argyll & Sutherland Highlanders
- Major and Brevet Lieutenant-Colonel Adrian Carton de Wiart VC DSO Dragoon Guards
- Colonel Herbert William Wilberforce CB
- Colonel Frederick Maurice Wilson CB
- Captain Charles Rupert Peter Winser DSO late Royal Lancaster Regiment
- Colonel John Watkins Yardley DSO

Canadian Force

- Lieutenant-Colonel Arthur Henry Bell DSO Alberta Regiment
- Lieutenant-Colonel Charles Edward Bent DSO Central Ontario Regiment
- Major James Sutherland Brown DSO Royal Canadian Regiment
- Lieutenant-Colonel Raymond Brutinel DSO Mounted Machine Gun Corps
- Lieutenant-Colonel William Hew Clark-Kennedy DSO Quebec Regiment
- Colonel John Munro Elder, Canadian Army Medical Corps
- Lieutenant-Colonel William Waring Primrose Gibsone DSO Royal Canadian Regiment
- Major Andrew Lorne Hamilton, Canadian Army Pay Corps
- Temp Brigadier-General William Birchall Macaulay King DSO Field Artillery
- Lieutenant-Colonel George Eric McCraig DSO Quebec Regiment
- Lieutenant-Colonel The Hon. Angus McDonnell, Railways Troops
- Colonel Arthur Evans Snell DSO Canadian Army Medical Corps
- Lieutenant-Colonel Thomas-Louis Tremblay DSO Quebec Regiment

Australian Force

- Colonel James Harold Cannan CB Infantry
- Colonel Thomas Henry Dodds DSO Corps Headquarters
- Lieutenant-Colonel James Murdoch Archer Durrant DSO VD Aust. General List
- Lieutenant-Colonel Charles Hazell Elliott DSO Infantry
- Colonel Robert Beveridge Huxtable DSO VD Army Medical Corps
- Lieutenant-Colonel Daniel Aston Luxton DSO Infantry
- Lieutenant-Colonel Terence Patrick McSharry DSO MC Infantry
- Lieutenant-Colonel Stanley Lyndall Milligan DSO Australian General List
- Lieutenant-Colonel George Francis Murphy DSO Infantry
- Lieutenant-Colonel Edmund James Houghton Nicholson DSO Engineers
- Colonel John Paton CB VD Infantry
- Lieutenant-Colonel John Henry Peck DSO Infantry
- Colonel William Livingstone Hatchwell Sinclair-Burgess DSO Artillery
- Lieutenant-Colonel Horace George Viney DSO Australian General List
- Lieutenant-Colonel Maurice Wilder-Neligan DSO DCM Infantry

New Zealand Force

- Lieutenant-Colonel Herbert Ernest Hart DSO Wellington Regiment
- Lieutenant-Colonel Charles William Melvill DSO Staff Corps

=== The Most Eminent Order of the Indian Empire ===
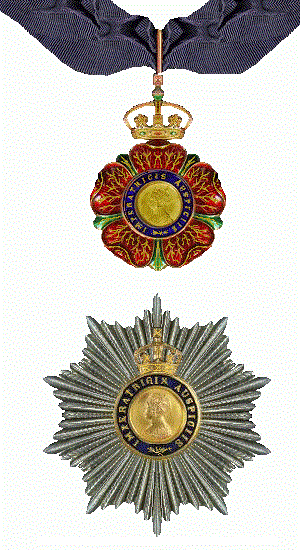
Riband, badge and star of the Knight Grand Commander of the Order of the Indian Empire

==== Knight Grand Commander (GCIE) ====
- His Highness Raja Sri Rama Varma, Raja of Cochin, Madras
- Sir Frederick William Duke KCSI KCIE Member of the Council of the Secretary of State for India

==== Knight Commander (KCIE) ====
- Thakur Sahib Lakhaji Raj Bawaji Raj, Thakur Sahib of Rajkot Kathiawar, Bombay
- Lieutenant-Colonel Walter James Buchanan CIE Indian Medical Service, Inspector-General of Prisons, Bengal
- Honorary Lieutenant-Colonel Raja Jai Chand CSI of Lambagaon, Punjab
- Rear-Admiral Drury St Aubyn Wake CB CIE late Senior Naval Officer, Persian Gulf

==== Companion (CIE) ====
- A. V. Venkataramana Iyer, Assistant Secretary to the Government of India, Finance Department
- Francis William Bain, Indian Educational Service, Principal, Deccan College, Bombay
- Charles Alfred Barber, Agricultural Service, Imperial Sugarcane Expert, Madras
- Major and Brevet Lieutenant-Colonel Frederick Adolphus Fleming Barnardo FRCSE Indian Medical Service, Deputy Assistant Director of Medical Services (Distribution), Bombay
- Roderick Korneli Biernacki ISO Locomotive Superintendent, North-Western State Railway
- Colonel Alfred Joseph Caruana, Indian Army, Judge Advocate-General in India
- Khan Bahadur Nawab Saiyid Nawab Ali Chaudhuri, Zamindar, Dhanbari, Mymensingh, Bengal
- George Herman Collier, Director-General of Stores, India Office
- John Desmond, Executive Engineer, Public Works Department, Nagpur, Central Provinces
- Claude Fraser de la Fosse, Indian Educational Service, Director of Public Instruction, United Provinces, and a Member of the Council of the Lieutenant-Governor for making Laws and Regulations
- Thomas Emerson, Indian Civil Service, Collector of Tipperah, Bengal
- Jyotsna Nath Ghosal, Indian Civil Service, Collector of Kaira, Bombay
- John Robertson Henderson FLS Superintendent, Government Museum, and Principal Librarian, Connemara Public Library, Madras
- Major Davis Heron FRCSE Indian Medical Service, Medical Officer, Seistan Consulate, and His Britannic Majesty's Vice-Consul for Seistan and Kain
- William Frederick Holms, Public Works Department, Chief Engineer, Irrigation Works, Punjab
- Henry Raikes Alexander Irwin, Singell Tea Estate, Darjeeling, Bengal
- John Ernest Jackson, Chief Auditor, Bombay, Baroda, and Central India Railway, Bombay
- Sardar Bahadur Farman Ali Khan, Adjutant-General, Kashmir State Army
- Qadir Baksh Khan, Lieutenant-Colonel Bahadur Commandant, 1st Company, Maler Kotla Imperial Service Sappers, Punjab
- Arthur Cecil McWatters Indian Civil Service, Controller (Hides and Wool), Indian Munitions Board
- Lieutenant-Colonel Ernest Alan Robert Newman Indian Medical Service, Civil Surgeon, and Superintendent, Medical School, Dacca, Bengal
- Alan William Pirn, Indian Civil Service, Magistrate and Collector of Benares
- Colonel Robert Montagu Poore DSO British Service, commanding Jhansi Brigade
- George Rainy, Indian Civil Service, Deputy Secretary to the Government of India, Finance Department
- Major Edward Tillotson Rich, Royal Engineers, Survey of India
- Edward Charles Ryland, Indian Police, Deputy Inspector-General of Police, lately Officiating Inspector-General of Police, Bihar and Orissa
- Bernhard Martin Samuelson, Chief Engineer and Officiating Joint Secretary, Public Works Department, Burma
- Sardar Bahadur Gurnam Singh, Home Secretary to His Highness the Maharaja and General of State Forces of Patiala, Punjab
- Kunwar Unkar Singh, of Patiala, Kotah State, General Superintendent of the Kotah State Police, Rajputana
- Raja Ratan Sen Singh, of Bansi, son of Raja Ram Singh, District Basti, United Provinces
- Lieutenant-Colonel Herbert Austen Smith, Indian Medical Service, Surgeon to His Excellency the Viceroy of India
- Colonel Robert George Strange, British Service, commanding Presidency Brigade
- Lieutenant-Colonel Cyril Frank Templer CMG Director-General, Army Remount Department
- Capt. Seymour Douglas Vale, Royal Indian Marine, Principal Port Officer and Marine Transport Officer, Rangoon
- Nasarwanji Navroji Wadia, Mill-owner and Merchant, Bombay
- Major George Henry Willis MVO Royal Engineers, Mint Master, Bombay

In recognition of the meritorious services in connection with operations on the Indian Frontier (To date from 1 January 1918) —

- Lieutenant-Colonel Thomas Gordon Blois-Johnson CMG
- Colonel Arthur Blanshard Hawley Drew
- Colonel Patrick Hehir CB CMG Indian Medical Service
- Colonel Robert Fox Sorsbie

=== The Royal Victorian Order ===
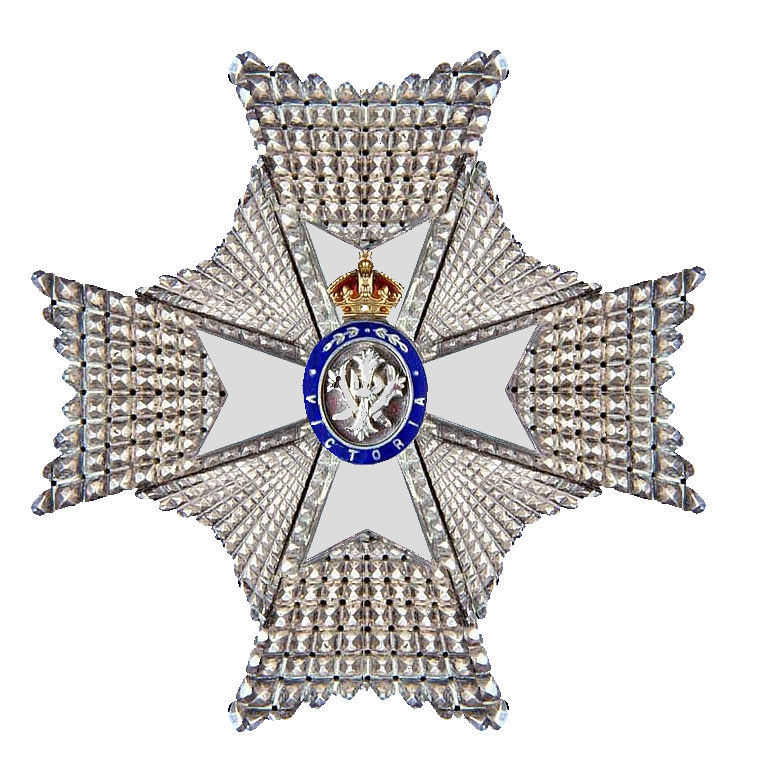
Insignia of a Knight / Dames Commander of the Royal Victorian Order

==== Knight Grand Cross of the Royal Victorian Order (GCVO) ====
- Lieutenant-General Sir Alfred Keogh GCB CH
- Colonel Sir Walter Roper Lawrence Bt GCIE CB
- Sir Edward John Poynter Bt KCVO President of the Royal Academy

==== Knight Commander of the Royal Victorian Order (KCVO) ====
- Lord Marcus de la Poer Beresford CVO
- Capt. Thomas Dacres Butler CVO
- Sir Luke Fildes, Royal Artillery
- William Llewellyn ARA
- Sir Alan Reeve Manby MVO
- Lieutenant-Colonel Sir Edward Scott Worthington CMG MVO Royal Army Medical Corps

==== Commander of the Royal Victorian Order (CVO) ====
- Lieutenant-Colonel The Hon. Alwyn Henry Fulke Greville MVO
- Sir Claud Schuster
- Harry Fagg Batterbee CMG

==== Member of the Royal Victorian Order, 4th class (MVO) ====
- Arthur Sheppard
- Charles Percival White

==== Member of the Royal Victorian Order, 5th class (MVO) ====
- William Deuchar
- Lieutenant Charles Edward Stretton, Royal Artillery

=== The Most Excellent Order of the British Empire ===
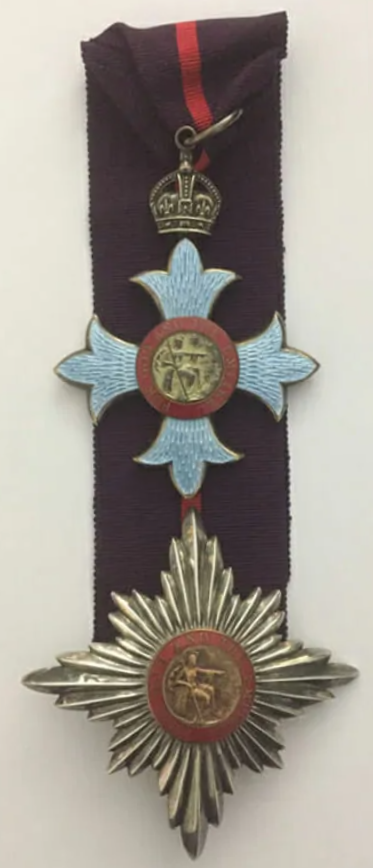
Knight Commander of the Order of the British Empire, insignia 1917–35

==== Dame Grand Cross of the Order of the British Empire (GBE) ====
- Her Highness Princess Christian CI RRC Member of the Council of the British Red Cross Society and of the Joint War Committee of the British Red Cross Society and the Order of St. John of Jerusalem in England
- Her Royal Highness Princess Louise, Duchess of Argyll CI RRC Member of the Council and President of the Kensington Branch of the British Red Cross Society
- Her Highness Princess Helena Victoria CI Lady President of the Young Men's Christian Association and President of the Women's Auxiliary of the Young Men's Christian Association for France
- Ethel Hope Becher RRC Matron-in-Chief, Queen Alexandra's Imperial Military Nursing Service
- Mary Ethel, Viscountess Harcourt — Honorary Secretary, American Women's War Relief Fund
- Agnes Weston Founder of the Royal Sailors' Rests at Naval Ports
- Charlotte Josephine, Marchioness of Winchester — President of the Hampshire Branch of the British Red Cross Society; Member of the Voluntary Aid Detachment Advisory Committee and of the Voluntary Aid Detachment Selection Board

==== Knight Grand Cross of the Order of the British Empire (GBE) ====
- Arthur David Brooks CBE Lord Mayor of Birmingham
- Sir William Edmund Garstin GCMG Member of the Council of the British Red Cross Society and of the Joint War Committee of the British Red Cross Society and the Order of St. John of Jerusalem in England; Member of the Voluntary Aid Detachment Advisory Committee and of the Voluntary Aid Detachment Selection Board
- Sir Charles Blair Gordon KBE Vice-Chairman of the British War Mission to the United States of America
- The Right Hon. Robert George Windsor-Clive, Earl of Plymouth CB Sub-Prior of the Order of St. John of Jerusalem in England; Member of the Joint War Committee of the British Red Cross Society and the Order of St. John of Jerusalem in England
- The Very Reverend Thomas Banks Strong Dean of Christ Church, Oxford; late Vice-Chancellor of the University of Oxford

==== Dame Commander of the Order of the British Empire (DBE) ====
- Katharine Marjory, Duchess of Atholl — President, Perthshire Branch, British Red Cross Society
- Florence Eveleen Eleanore, Lady Bell — President, North Riding of Yorkshire Branch, British Red Cross Society
- The Hon. Maud Elizabeth Bevan — President of the Hertfordshire Branch, British Red Cross Society; Commandant, Royston Auxiliary Hospital
- Augusta Mary Monica, Marchioness of Bute — Donor and Commandant, Bute House Naval Hospital, Rothesay.
- Anna Maria, Lady Donner — Vice-President, Fallowfield Division, British Red Cross Society; Organiser of Fairview Auxiliary Hospital, Fallowfield
- Clarissa Reid — President of the Workers Committee, and Honorary Secretary, Anglo-South American Central Depot
- Aileen Mary, Countess Roberts — Honorary Secretary, Officers' Families Fund; founder of the Countess Roberts Field Glass Fund
- Mary Dorothea, Countess Waldegrave — Deputy President, Somersetshire Branch, British Red Cross Society

==== Knight Commander of the Order of the British Empire (KBE) ====
- Colonel Henry Edward Fane Goold-Adams CB CMG Late Controller, Munitions Inventions Department
- John Archer — Chairman of the Advisory Committee (Customs and Excise) on Wines and Spirits
- Captain Henry Dennis Readett-Bayley JP DL Organiser of the Dennis Bayley Fund for the transport of wounded
- Arthur Shirley Benn MP Chairman, Belgian Relief Committee
- Harry Brittain — Founder of the American Officers' Club
- Brigadier-General Joseph Aloysius Byrne CB Inspector-General, Royal Irish Constabulary
- Thomas Henry Hall Caine, Novelist, dramatist, short story writer, poet and critic
- Theodore Gervase Chambers — Controller, National War Savings Committee
- Cyril Stephen Cobb MVO Late Chairman, London County Council
- Robert Lowden Connell — Deputy Director of Salvage
- Edward Marriott Cooke Chairman of the Board of Control
- Horace Darwin FRS Chairman of the Cambridge Scientific Instrument Company, Ltd. Member of the Munitions Inventions Department Panel
- John Duthie JP Senior Assistant Director-General of Voluntary Organisations
- John Esplen — Senior Partner in the firm of Messrs. Esplen, Sons, & Swainston, Ltd., Naval Architects
- John Ferguson — Assistant to the Surveyor-General of Supply, War Office
- Gilbert Francis Garnsey — Joint Controller of Munitions Accounts
- Lieutenant-Colonel Albert George Hadcock TD FRS Managing Director, Sir W. G. Armstrong Whitworth & Company, Ltd.
- Cecil Reeves Harrison — Director, Messrs. Harrison & Sons, Printers
- Sydney Herbert Holcroft Henn — Director of Army Priority
- Osborn George Holmden JP Director of the Inter-Allied Chartering Executive
- Alexander Cruikshank Houston CM Director of Water Examinations, Metropolitan Water Board
- Henry Japp CBE Member of the British War Mission to the-United States of America
- Walter Samuel Kinnear — Chairman of the Navy and Army Insurance Fund; Deputy Chairman of the National Health Insurance Commission (Ireland)
- Hugh Gwynne Levick — Representative of the Treasury on the London Exchange Committee
- Bertram Lewis Lima — Ministry of Information
- Joseph Lowrey — Secretary, London Salvage Association
- John Lumsden Vice-Chairman of Joint Voluntary Aid Detachment Committee, Ireland
- Harry Duncan McGowan — Managing Director of Nobel's Explosives Co., Ltd.
- William Warrender Mackenzie CBE KC A Chairman of the Committee on Production
- Sigismund Ferdinand Mendl — Member of the Royal Commission on Wheat Supplies
- Thomas Hudson Middleton CB Deputy Director-General, Food Production Department, Board of Agriculture
- Colonel Sir Frederic Lewis Nathan — Chairman, Standing Committee on the Causes of Explosions at Government and Controlled Factories, Ministry of Munitions; Chairman, Advisory Committee on Alcohol Supplies for War Purposes
- Adam Nimmo — President of the Mining Association of Great Britain; Chairman of the Board of Trade Committee on the Coal Trade after the War; Member of the Central Coal and Coke Supplies Committee
- Major William Orpen ARA
- Admiral Sir Richard Henry Peirse KCB MVO Naval Member of the Central Committee of the Board of Invention and Research
- Percival Lea Dewhurst Perry CBE Director of Mechanical Warfare, Ministry of Munitions
- Lindsay Byron Peters — Chairman, Engineer and Works Supply Committee, War Office
- James William Restler — Chairman of the Metropolitan Munitions Committee; Chief Engineer, Metropolitan Water Board
- Lieutenant-Colonel Walrond Arthur Frank Sinclair — Controller of Registration, Ministry of National Service; Director of National Service for the London Region
- Allan MacGregor Smith — Chairman of the Management Committee of the Engineering Employers Federation
- Harris Spencer JP Chairman of the Birmingham Board of Management, Ministry of Munitions; Chairman of the Midland Employers' Federation
- Howard Handley Spicer — Managing Director, Messrs. James Spicer & Sons, Limited; Technical Adviser to the War Office
- Lieutenant-Colonel Albert Stern CMG Liaison Officer between British and United States Tanks Department; late Director-General of Mechanical Warfare, Ministry of Munitions
- Colonel Robert King Stewart — Convener of the County of Lanark
- Robert Fox-Symons MRCS LRCP Head of Auxiliary Hospitals Department, British Red Cross Society and Order of St. John of Jerusalem
- James Taggart, Lord Provost of Aberdeen; Chairman of the Aberdeen Munitions Board of Management
- His Honour Judge William Francis Kyffin Taylor — Judge of the Liverpool Court of Passage
- Colonel Sir Courtauld Thomson CB Chief British Red Cross Commissioner for Malta and the Near East
- William Mitchell-Thomson CBE MP Director of the Restriction of Enemy Supplies Department
- John Edward Thornycroft — Director, Messrs. John I. Thornycroft & Company., Ltd.
- Seymour Biscoe Tritton — Partner, Messrs. Rendel, Palmer & Tritton, Consulting Engineers
- William Ellis Hume-Williams KC MP Liaison Officer between the War Trade Department and the Commission Internationale de Ravitaillement; late British Red Cross Commissioner, Petrograd; Member of the Central Prisoners of War Committee
- Thomas Fleming Wilson JP Clerk of the Peace for the City of Glasgow; Clerk to the General Munitions of War Tribunal for Scotland, and to the Local Tribunal for Glasgow; Agent of HM Procurator-General, and of the Treasury Solicitor in Glasgow

India

- Maharaja Bahadur Sir Bhagwati Prasad Singh KCIE Taluqdar of Balrampur, District Gonda, United Provinces
- Lieutenant-Colonel Frank Popham Young CIE CBE Indian Army Commissioner, Rawalpindi Division, Punjab
- Maharaja Bahadur Sir Rameshwar Singh GCIE of Darbhanga. Landholder, Bihar and Orissa
- Pirajirao Bapu Sahib Ghatge CSI CIE Chief of Kagal (senior branch), Kolhapur, Bombay

Egypt and the Sudan

- Colonel George Samuel Abercrombie Harvey Pasha CMG Head of Police and Provost Marshal of Cairo

==== Commander of the Order of the British Empire (CBE) ====
- Colonel Anthony John Abdy CB Assistant Military Secretary, Southern Command
- Laura Elizabeth, Baroness Aberconway — Donor and Administrator, Annexe to King Edward VII's Hospital
- James Adam OBE National War Aims Committee
- Thomas Adams JP Chairman, South-East Scotland Joint Committee, Ministry of Pensions
- Samuel John Henry Wallis Allin — Actuary, National Health Insurance Joint Committee
- Captain Francis Arthur Lavington Andrews RN King's Harbour Master, Malta
- Augustus Gordon Grant Asher — County Clerk of Midlothian, and Clerk of Lieutenancy; Secretary to the Association of Scottish County Councils
- Gertrude Mary Bailey
- Captain George Edward Bairnsfather RN Divisional Naval Transport Officer, Dover
- Edward Charles Cyril Baly FRS Professor of Chemistry, Liverpool University; Deputy Inspector of High Explosives, Liverpool Area
- Joseph Barcroft FRS Superintendent of Physiological Investigations, Chemical Warfare Department, Ministry of Munitions
- Charles Coupar Barrie — Commercial Adviser to Naval Assistant, Ministry of Shipping
- Rose Mabel Beatty — Commandant, Green Cross Society
- Conrad Beck — President, British Optical Instrument Manufacturers' Association; Chairman and Managing Director, Messrs. R. and J. Beck, Limited
- The Hon. Muriel Helen Florence Beckett — Donor and Administrator of Hospital for Officers, 34, Grosvenor Street, London
- Major John Hay Beith MC
- Major Ernest Albert Belcher — Director of Vegetable Supplies, Ministry of Food
- Robert Bell — North Eastern Railway Company
- Lieutenant-Colonel Henry Vere Fane Benet — For services in Russia
- Ernest John Pickstone Benn — Chairman (unpaid) of the Trade Organization Commissioners, Ministry of Reconstruction
- Colonel Frank Benson — Assistant Managing Director, Navy and Army Canteen Board
- The Right Reverend Monsignor Manuel John, Bishop Bidwell — Secretary to His Eminence Cardinal Bourne
- Lieutenant-Colonel Harry Woodburn Blaylock — Canadian Red Cross Commissioner, France
- Herbert Holford Bottomley — Director of Special Publicity, War Loan Campaign
- Captain Sir Harold Edwin Boulton Bt CVO Queen Mary's Hostel for Nurses
- William Walter Bradfield — Director and Manager, Marconi Company
- The Hon. Florence Marshall Brooks — Donor and Administrator, Portal Auxiliary Hospital, Tarporley, Cheshire
- W. Brown JP Chairman of Directors, Messrs. W. Simons & Co.
- Jeffrey Browning OBE ISO Assistant Secretary, Board of Customs and Excise
- Georgina Grenfell Buckler — Enquiry Department for Wounded and Missing, British Red Cross Society
- William Buckley — Chairman, North Wales Munitions Board of Management
- Joseph Burn — Member of the National War Savings Committee
- Sir Henry Parsall Burt KCIE VD Representing India Office on Ministry of Munitions Priority Committee
- Sir Hector Clare Cameron Red Cross Commissioner for Western District of Scotland
- George Wallace Carter, National War Aims Committee
- Brigadier-General James Eales Gaunter CB Brigadier-General in charge of Administration, Western Command
- Colonel Sir Thomas Sturmy Cave KCB VD Chairman, Young Men's Christian Association; National War Emergency Committee
- Alfred Chandler — General Manager and Secretary, Mersey Docks and Harbour Board, Liverpool
- Anastasia, Lady Cheetham — Commandant, Voluntary Aid Detachment 2, Cairo
- Robert Chisholm — Superintendent of Ordnance Factories, Messrs. William Beardmore and Company., Ltd.
- Colonel Arthur Gillespie Churchill CB Late Chief Cable Censor
- George Jackson Churchward — Chief Mechanical Engineer, Great Western Railway
- John Harold Clapham Deputy Director, Industrial (War Enquiries) Branch, Board of Trade; Member of the Industries Committee of the War Priorities Committee
- Ernest Clark — Deputy Chief Inspector of Taxes, Inland Revenue Department
- Joseph Percival Clarke — Deputy Director of Inland Waterways and Docks, War Office
- Sir William Edwin Clegg JP Chairman, Sheffield Local Munitions Tribunal
- David Wilson Coates — Chief Accountant, Financial Branch, Coal Mines Department, Board of Trade
- Herbert Mansfield Cobb — Honorary Adviser to the War Office and Ministry of Munitions on Land Questions
- William Cocks — Managing Director, Channel Dry Docks Company, Cardiff
- William Richard Codling MVO Deputy Controller, HM Stationery Office
- Colonel Herbert Covington Cole — Chief Valuer and Compensation Officer, Land Directorate, War Office
- Major Alfred Stephen Collard — Director of Billeting and Commandant of Orderlies, British Red Cross Commission, France
- Colonel Lord Douglas James Cecil Compton — For services with the British Expeditionary Force, France
- James Alexander Cooper JP Principal Clerk (temporary), Finance Department, War Office
- Colonel Fiennes Stanley Wykeham Cornwallis DL JP TD Chairman, Kent War Agricultural Executive Committee
- Colonel Edmund Arthur Waldegrave Courtney CMG Director of Requisition Services, British Expeditionary Force, France
- Thomas Cox JP National War Aims Committee
- Major Algernon Tudor-Craig — Secretary of the Incorporated Soldiers' and Sailors' Help Society
- John Craig — Managing Director, Messrs. David Colville & Sons, Limited
- Brigadier-General Sir Robert Cranston KCVO CB DL VD
- Mary Crowdy — Deputy Principal Commandant of Voluntary Aid Detachments in France
- David Charles Cummings — Assistant Industrial Commissioner, Ministry of Labour
- Edith Bassett Curzon — Donor and Organiser, Officers' Hospital, Watermouth Castle, Berrynarbor, North Devonshire
- Thomas Dally — Superintendent of Naval Construction, Admiralty
- Muriel Bromley Davenport — Vice-chairman of the Hove War Hospital Supply Depots
- Henry Samuel Denny — Superintendent at one of HM Factories, Ministry of Munitions
- Captain Maurice Edward Denny — Late Deputy Director of Designs, Department of the Controller-General for Merchant Shipbuilding, Admiralty
- Henry Newton Dickson FRGS Professor of Geography, University College, Reading; Head of Geographical Section, Naval Intelligence Division, Admiralty
- Harold Baily Dixon FRS Professor of Chemistry, Manchester University
- Alfred Dobrée — Member, Ordnance Committee, Ministry of Munitions
- Helen, Lady Dodds — Head of Prisoners of War Fund, British Red Cross Society
- Campbell Dodgson — Keeper of Prints and Drawings, British Museum
- Colonel William Edward Donohue — Inspector of Mechanical Transport, Eastern Theatres of Operations
- Brevet Colonel Henry Dowrish Drake — Royal Military Academy
- Edith Florence, Lady Grant-Duff — Founder and Organiser of the Bread Bureau for Prisoners of War
- John Whelan Dulanty — Assistant-Secretary (Establishment Department), Ministry of Munitions
- Albert Eddison — General Manager, Messrs. Kynoch, Limited
- John Owain Evans
- Major Arthur Stewart Eve FRS Resident Director of Research, Admiralty Experimental Station, Parkeston
- The Hon. Muriel Fitzroy — Head of General Service Section, Joint Women's Voluntary Aid Detachment Department, British Red Cross Society
- Vice-Admiral Henry Louis Fleet — County Director, Auxiliary Hospitals & Voluntary Aid Detachments, Berkshire
- Brigadier-General Albert Fletcher MC Director of Air Quarter Master Services, Air Ministry
- William Fraser — Managing Director, Pumpherston Oil Company, Ltd.
- Philip Horace Freeman — Honorary Secretary, Business Committee, The Marchioness of Lansdowne Officers' Families' Fund
- Myra Maclndoe Gibson— Honorary Organiser & General Manager, Central Surgical Depot, Queen Mary's Needlework Guild
- Alexander Goddard — Joint Secretary of Lord Selborne's Agricultural Policy Sub-Committee of the Ministry of Reconstruction
- Colonel Robert Edmund Golightly DSO
- Edward Carter Kersey Gonner Professor of Economic Science, Liverpool University; Director of Statistics, Ministry of Food
- Henry Goode, Ministry of Information
- Gladys Sheffield Hamilton-Grace — Founder and Joint Honorary Secretary, Mesopotamia Comforts Fund
- Colonel Samuel Charles Norton Grant CB CMG
- John Ernest Greaves — His Majesty's Lieutenant for the County of Caernarvonshire; Chairman, Carnarvonshire Appeal Tribunal
- Captain John Alfred Henderson Green — County Director, Auxiliary Hospitals and Voluntary Aid DetachmentS, Nottinghamshire
- His Honour Judge Francis John Greenwell — Joint Chairman, Durham Appeal Tribunal
- Robert Morrell Greenwood — Assistant, Treasury Solicitor's Department, Law Courts Branch
- Major John Ronald Greg — Director, Metropolitan Carriage, Wagon and Finance Co., Ltd.
- Lilian Decima Moore-Guggisberg — Honorary Secretary, British Army and Navy Leave Club, Paris
- Elinor Marie Jessie Halle — Surgical Requisites Branch, Queen Mary's Needlework Guild
- Basil Howard Alers Hankey — County Director, Auxiliary Hospitals and Voluntary Aid Detachments, Wiltshire
- Captain Francis Hugh George Hercy DL Voluntary worker on recruiting duties, Ministry of National Service
- Sydney George Higgins — Assistant Accountant-General (unpaid), Ministry of Shipping
- Alfred John Hill — Chief Mechanical Engineer, Great Eastern Railway
- Brevet Lieutenant-Colonel Geoffrey Lennard Hoare — General Staff Officer, 2nd Grade, War Office
- William John Hocking — First Assistant Superintendent, Operative Department, and Librarian and Curator of the Museum, Royal Mint
- Mary Eleanor Gwynne Holford — Founder of Queen Mary's Auxiliary Hospital for Limbless Soldiers, Roehampton
- Howard Hollingsworth — Member of Executive Committee of the King Albert's Hospitals Committee
- Henry Charles Herman Hawker Houndle ISO Chief Clerk, Local Government Board
- Major Stephen Goodwin Howard JP Chairman, Cambridgeshire Appeal Tribunal
- Harry Kynoch Hudson — Late Red Cross Commissioner at Salonika, and subsequently in Roumania
- James Huggett — Financial Adviser, Egyptian Expeditionary Force
- Evan Hughes — Director of Organisation, National War Savings Committee
- Colonel John Arthur Hughes CB VD DL County Director, Auxiliary Hospitals and Voluntary Aid Detachments, Glamorganshire
- Sydney Herbert George Hughes — Accountant, National Health Insurance Commission (England)
- Albert Hunt — Joint Manager, Union Castle Mail Steamship Co., Ltd.
- Edward Mauger Iliffe — Controller, Machine Tool Department, Ministry of Munitions
- Sir Henry Mather Jackson Bt Chairman, Monmouthshire Appeal Tribunal
- Alfred Henry James — Chairman of the Training Subcommittee of the Joint Committee of the West Midland Area
- Engineer-Captain William Henry James RN Engineering Manager, Devonport Dockyard
- Brigadier-General Francis Conway Jenkins — Director of Parks and Depots, Air Ministry
- Mark Webster Jenkinson — Controller of Factory Accounts and Factory Costs, Ministry of Munitions
- Rear-Admiral Edmund Purefoy Ellis Jervoise — Captain of Royal Naval College, Greenwich; Manager of the Seaman's Dreadnought Hospital
- Henry Langhorne Johnson — Honorary Chief Commissioner for France and Flanders, Church Army
- William John Jones — Assistant Controller, Iron and Steel Department, Ministry of Munitions
- Captain Francis L'Estrange Joseph — Assistant Secretary, Ministry of National Service
- William Keene MVO Late His Britannic Majesty's Consul-General, Genoa
- Frank Knowles, War Office Meat Expert
- Harry Philip Parnell Lane MVO Chief Constable of Lancashire
- Charles Russell Lang — Joint Managing Director, Messrs. G. & J. Weir, Ltd., Cathcart
- Major-General Henry Herbert Lee JP DL
- Thomas Morison Legge Chief Medical Inspector of Factories
- Acting Paymaster-in-Chief Frank Lenn RN In charge of the Central Pay Office of the Royal Naval Air Service
- Marion Eva Lethbridge — Commandant of General Service Voluntary Aid Detachments in France
- William Malesbury Letts — Managing Director, Crossley Motors, Limited
- Charles Ashton Lister — Member, West of England Munition Board of Management; Member, Board of Management Reconstruction Advisory Panel
- Ernest Knightley Little — County Director, Auxiliary Hospitals an Voluntary Aid Detachments, Warwickshire
- Edward William Lucas — Managing Director, Messrs. Bell, Hills Lucas, Limited
- Emma Maud McCarthy RRC Matron-in-Chief, Queen Alexandra's Imperial Military Nursing Service
- Major The Rev. John Howard MacDonald MBE Assistant Director of Chaplain Services, Canadian Forces
- Charles John Graham MacGuckin — General Manager, Ammunition Department, Messrs. Sir W. G. Armstrong Whitworth & Company., Ltd.
- Robert John MacKay — Principal Clerk — Secretary's Office, General Post Office
- Colonel John Dolben Mackworth — Deputy-Director of Balloons, Air Ministry
- Colonel William Richard James McLean TD Assistant Adjutant-General — Inspecting Officer of the Transport Workers' Battalions
- Lieutenant-Colonel William McLellan RM
- Arnold Duncan McNair — Production Branch, Coal Mines Department, Board of Trade
- Sydney Mager — Chief Inspector, Food Production Department
- Lawrence Margerison — Director of Administration of Local War Savings Committees
- Herbert Marriott — Chief Goods Manager, Lancashire and Yorkshire Railway
- Colonel William Marsh VD County Director, Auxiliary Hospitals and Voluntary Aid Detachments, Somersetshire
- Captain George Walter Howard Martin RN Divisional Naval Transport Officer, Devonport
- Norman Melland — War Trade Department
- Holberry Mensforth — General Works Manager, British Westinghouse Electric & Manufacturing Co., Ltd.; Member, Manchester Cooperative Munitions Board of Management, and Member Manchester National Shell Factory Board of Management
- John Alexander Milne — Chairman of the Linen and Silk Committee of the War Trade Board; Member of the Flax Control Board, War Trade Department
- Lieutenant-Colonel Seaburne Godfrey Arthur May Moens — Red Cross Commissioner, Mesopotamia
- Lieutenant-Colonel John Mitchell Moncrieff — Royal Engineers. Late Director of Engineering Work, Department of the Controller-General for Merchant Shipbuilding, Admiralty
- Major Charles Babington Smith Monfries OBE Finance Secretary to the Commission Internationale de Ravitaillement
- Caroline Mary Sybil Eyres Monsell — Donor and Administrator, Annexe to King Edward VII's Hospital
- Lieutenant-Colonel Thomas Henry Morris JP DL Chairman, West Riding Standing Joint Committee
- John Fitzgerald Moylan — Senior Clerk, Home Office
- Hugh Murray CIE JP Head of the Home Grown Timber Branch, Timber Supplies Department, Board of Trade
- George Howard Nash — Chief Engineer, Western Electric Company
- John Newlands CIE Controller of the Central Telegraph Office, General Post Office
- Brigadier-General John Sanctuary Nicholson CB CMG DSO For services with the British Expeditionary Force in France
- Henry Norris — Dock and Warehouse Manager, Port of London Authority
- Robert Frederick Norton KC VD Legal Adviser to the Foreign Trade Department
- Alfred Noyes
- Thomas Downham Nuttall — Chairman, Bury Munitions Board of Management
- Charles Roger Orr — Late Chairman, Dundee Munitions Board of Management
- John Stewart Oxley — General Inspector, Local Government Board
- Frederick Handley Page — Managing Director, Messrs. Handley Page, Limited
- William Morton Page — Assistant Secretary (Requirements and Statistics Department), Ministry of Munitions
- Major Eden Wilberforce Paget — Director of Transport, British Red Cross Commission, France
- Colonel William Henry Parkes CMG Director of Medical Services, New Zealand Expeditionary Force
- Engineer-Captain William Roskilly Parsons RN
- Colonel Denis Paul CMG Principal Inspector of Ordnance Machinery, British Expeditionary Force, France
- Sylvia May Payne Commandant and Medical Officer in Charge, Torquay Auxiliary Hospital
- John Penoyre
- Arthur Peters JP National War Aims Committee
- Thomas William Phillips — Acting Assistant Director, Employment Department, Ministry, of Labour
- Lieutenant-Colonel Henry Philip Picot — British Representative, Prisoners of War, Switzerland
- Edmund Potter — Assistant Solicitor to the Board of Trade
- Colonel James Leslie Grove Powell VD DL JP
- Colonel William Price CB CMG VD Director of Army Postal Services, British Expeditionary Force, France
- Sir Henry Edward Edleston Procter — Acting Honorary Treasurer, Young Men's Christian Association
- Granville George, Baron Radstock — Young Men's Christian Association, Egypt
- Robert Sangster Rait — Professor of Scottish History and Literature, Glasgow University
- Albion Henry Herbert Richardson MP Chairman of Law Society Section of London Appeal Tribunal
- Cecil Guy Ridley — Headquarters Staff, Metropolitan Special Constabulary
- Lieutenant-Colonel Struan Gordon Robertson — Officer in Charge of Estates Branch, Overseas Military Forces of Canada
- Andrew Robinson MVO Principal Surveyor, Board of Public Works, Ireland
- Edith Louise Julie, Lady Rogers — Voluntary Aid Detachment, Cairo
- Thomas Emerson Ruddock — Head of Norwegian Section, Ministry of Shipping
- Charles Ryall FRCS Assessor in Charge, London Medical Assessors for Examination of Men for Military Service
- Colonel Charles Montgomery Ryan CMG DSO Services with the British Expeditionary Force, France
- Mervyn Frederick Ryan — Director of Munitions Gauges
- Francis Salisbury ISO Surveyor, General Post Office
- John Sampson — Late British Representative on Anglo-Russian Sub-Committee in New York
- Edward Marlay Samson — Chairman, South Wales Joint Committee, Ministry of Pensions
- Lieutenant-Colonel Maxwell Barcham Sayer — Assistant Director, Inland Waterways and Docks, War Office
- William Schooling — Member of the National War Savings Committee
- Charles Scott — Lord Provost of Perth
- John Renwick Seager JP National War Aims Committee
- Cornelius James Selway — Superintendent of the Line, Great Northern Railway
- John Thomas Beadsworth Sewell Solicitor to His Britannic Majesty's Embassy, Paris
- Colonel Charles Henry Ludovic Sharman — Canadian Field Artillery
- Albert William Smith — Chairman, Hartlepool Local Munitions Tribunal
- Paymaster-in-Chief Charles Roach-Smith RN
- Edward Shrapnell Shrapnell-Smith — Chairman of the Standing Joint Committee of Mechanical Road Transport Associations; Chief Economy Officer, Petroleum Executive
- George Scoby Smith JP Commercial Manager, Messrs. Bolckow Vaughan and Co., Ltd.
- Henry White Smith — Director and Secretary, British and Colonial Aeroplane Company., Ltd.; Chairman, Society of British Aircraft Constructors
- James Cruickshank Smith — Vice-Chairman, Ministry of Munitions Special Arbitration Tribunal on Women's Wages; late Director, Wages Section, Ministry of Munitions
- Major Percy George Darvil-Smith — County Director, Auxiliary Hospitals and Voluntary Aid Detachments, Middlesex
- Robert John Smith— Convener of Transport Committee, Glasgow Area, Scottish Branch, British Red Cross Society
- Thomas James Smith — Commissioner of Police, Belfast
- Ida Elizabeth Smithe — Honorary Secretary, Rye Division of Sussex, British Red Cross and Order of St. John of Jerusalem; Commandant, Normanhurst Auxiliary Hospital, Battle
- Phyllis, Baroness Somerleyton — Organiser and late Commandant, Chieveley Park Auxiliary Hospital, Suffolk
- Commander Guy Standing RNVR Member of the British War Mission-to the United States of America
- Major Joseph Henry Stanley — Deputy Red Cross Commissioner, Mesopotamia
- W. H. Steele — Assistant Traffic Manager and Acting Traffic Manager, Chinese Government Railways, Pekin-Mukden Line
- Major Frank Augustus Douglas Stevens DL Chairman, Bedfordshire Territorial Force Association
- James Verdier Stevenson MVO Chief Constable of the City of Glasgow
- William March Stevenson OBE Finance Section, Ministry of Blockade
- Rear-Admiral Harry Hampson Stileman — Senior Naval Officer, Liverpool
- Lieutenant-Colonel Edward Fairbrother Strange TD Deputy Director of Butter and Cheese Supply, Ministry of Food
- John Strong, Rector of the Royal High School, Edinburgh; President of the Educational Institute of Scotland
- Acting Captain William Halpin Paterson Sweny RD RNR
- William Swire — County Director, Auxiliary Hospitals and Voluntary Aid Detachments, Shropshire
- Andrew Wilson Tait — Chairman, The British Aluminium Co., Ltd.
- Muriel Lucy Talbot OBE
- Brigadier-General Gerald Kyffin-Taylor VD Director of National Service, North Western Region
- Major The Rev. George Herbert Thompson — County Director, Auxiliary Hospitals and Voluntary Aid Detachments, Norfolk
- William Bruce Thompson — Managing Director, Caledon Shipbuilding and Engineering Company
- Robert Tootill MP National War Aims Committee
- Walter Livingstone Topple — Superintendent, The Electric and Ordnance Accessories Co., Ltd.
- Captain John Henry Trye RN Naval Adviser to Chief Censor, War Office
- Jane Holland Turnbull Controller of Medical Services, Queen Mary's Army Auxiliary Corps
- Ernest James Turner — Assistant Secretary, Revenue and Statistics Department, India Office
- Beresford Verschoyle — Chief Engineer, Egyptian State Railways
- Captain Sidney Philip Charles Vesey JP National War Aims Committee
- Edward Robert Eckersall Vicars — His Britannic Majesty's Consul-General, Lyon
- Hylda Henrietta, Lady DesVoeux — Chairman, Overseas Club, Soldiers' and Sailors' Fund
- Henry William Wale JP Chairman, Warwickshire (Coventry and District) Appeal Tribunal
- Alexander Walker JP Assessor of the City of Glasgow
- Brevet Lieutenant-Colonel Herbert Sutherland Walker — Chief Permit Officer, Home Office
- Sophie Florence Lothrop Hall-Walker — Organiser and Administrator of the Hall-Walker Hospital for Officers
- William Walker — HM Acting Chief Inspector of Mines Member of Coal Export Committee
- Sydney Walton — Ministry of Food
- The Hon. Jean Templeton, Lady Ward — Commandant of Bathurst House Hospital for Officers, and of Ward's Hospital, Reigate
- William Webster — National War Aims Committee
- Major George Frederick Parrett West — Royal Engineers Superintendent of the Line, London and South-Western Railway
- Constance Edwina, Duchess of Westminster — Organiser of No. 1 (Duchess of Westminster) Red Cross Hospital, France
- Major Henry Frederick Wilkinson — Headquarters Staff, Metropolitan Special Constabulary
- Richard Williamson
- Robert Williamson JP Managing Director, Mount Stuart Dry Docks Company, Cardiff
- Second Lieutenant Thomas Olaf Willson — Ministry of Information
- John Henry Wilson
- Joseph Maitland Wilson — County Director, Auxiliary Hospitals and Voluntary Aid Detachments, Suffolk
- Robert Clermont Witt — Treasury Solicitor's Department; Trustee of the National Gallery
- Augustus Ottiwell Wood — Chief Manager of the Imperial Bank of Persia, Teheran
- Engineer-Commander William Henry Wood RN Director and Engineering Manager, Messrs. John Brown & Co. Ltd
- Lieutenant-Colonel Thomas Stanley Woodburn — Chief Commissioner, Australian Comforts Fund
- George Ernest Woodward — Director of Ammunition Production. Admiralty
- Thomas Henry Woolston JP County Director, Auxiliary Hospitals and Voluntary Aid Detachments, Northamptonshire
- Charles Henry Wordingham — President of the Institution of Electrical Engineers; Director of Electrical Engineering, Admiralty
- Arthur Worley — General Manager, North British and Mercantile Insurance Company; Member of Committees advising the Ministry of Munitions on Explosion Claims and Explosion Indemnities
- Albert Charles Wratislaw, His Britannic Majesty's Consul-General, Salonica
- James Brown Wright Chief Constable, City Police, Newcastle upon Tyne
- Daniel Henderson Lusk Young JP DL Director of Recruiting and Director of National Service, Northern Region

India

- Charlotte, Lady Robertson OBE
- Sir Fazulbhoy Currimbhoy Ebrahim — An Additional Member of the Council of the Governor-General for making Laws and Regulations; Joint Honorary Secretary, Bombay Branch of the Imperial Indian Wai-Relief Fund
- Frank Willingdon Carter CIE Partner, Messrs. Turner, Morrison & Co.; Sheriff of Calcutta, Bengal
- Charles Joseph Hallifax — Indian Civil Service; Commissioner, Jullundur Division, and a Member of the Council of the Lieutenant-Governor of the Punjab for making Laws and Regulations.
- Percy Wyndham CIE Indian Civil Service; Commissioner of Kumaun, United Provinces
- Lewis James Mountford — Indian Civil Service; Commissioner, Southern Division, Bombay.
- Lieutenant-Colonel Alfred Charles Elliott — Indian Army; Deputy-Commissioner, Gurgaon, Punjab
- Sheikh Asghar Ali — Indian Civil Service; Deputy Commissioner, Ludhiana, Punjab
- Joseph Wilson-Johnston — Indian Civil Service; Deputy Commissioner, Jhelum, Punjab
- William Browne Brander — Indian Civil Service; Deputy Commissioner, Tavoy District, Burma
- Captain Neville Frederick Jarvis Wilson CMG Royal Indian Marine
- Edward Pinder Fawcett — Indian Civil Service; Collector of Etah, United Provinces
- Sri Raja Rao Venkata Kumara Mahipati Surya Rao Bahadur, Raja of Pithapuram, Godavari District, Madras
- Sir Archibald Birkmyre — Partner, Messrs. Birkmyre Brothers, Bengal
- Edward John Buck OBE Honorary Secretary, Indian Central Committee, "Our Day."
- Sarat Kumar Mullick OBE Honorary Secretary, Bengali Regiment Committee, Calcutta

Egypt and the Sudan

- William George Hayter — Counsel to His Highness the Sultan of Egypt and Legal Adviser to the Residency and the Ministries of Finance and Education
- Gerald Campbell Dudgeon — Consulting Agriculturist with rank of Director-General in Ministry of Agriculture
- Cyril Goodman MRCS LRCP Assistant Director-General in the Department of Public Health
- Major Randle Montagu Feilden — Reserve of Officers; Civil Secretary, Sudan Government

=== Members of the Order of the Companions of Honour (CH) ===
- Colonel Sir Herbert Charles Perrott Bt CB
- Sir Samuel Butler Provis KCB
- Sir Frederick Treves Bt GCVO CB

=== Distinguished Service Order (DSO) ===
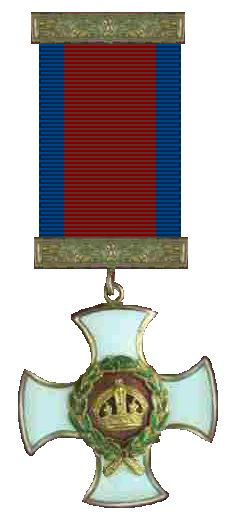
Riband and Badge of the Distinguished Service Order

Royal Navy

- Commander Oswald Charles Merriman Barry RN
- Capt. Archer Napier Heathcote RN
- Vice-Admiral Frank Hannan Henderson CMG
- Rear-Admiral Hugh Thomas Hibbert
- Commander Thomas Alban Jones RD RNR
- Lieutenant-Commander Oliver Locker-Lampson CMG MP RNVR
- Commander Randal Borough McCowen RN
- Commander William Henry Owen RNR
- Engineer Commander Elias George Pallot RN
- Major William Skeffington Poe, Royal Marine Artillery
- Capt. Herbert Neville Rolfe RN
- Lieutenant-Commander Arthur Avison Scott RN
- Lieutenant-Commander Cuthbert Winthrop Swithinbank RN
- Engineer Commander William Symington Torrance RN
- Capt. Thomas Philip Walker RNR (Admiral, retired.)
- Lieutenant-Commander Christopher John Frederick Wood RN
- Capt. George Bennett Weston Young RN

Royal Air Force

- Major John Eustace Arthur Baldwin
- Major Arthur Courtney Boddam-Whetham
- Captain Benjamin Henry Noel Hans Hamilton
- Major Alwyn Vesey Holt
- Captain Warwick Wright

For distinguished services rendered in connection with Military Operations on the Indian Frontier (Dated 1 January 1918)—

- Major Arthur William Dauncey Cornish MC Gurkha Rifles, Indian Army
- Major Horace William Francis Twiss, Indian Army
- Lieutenant-Colonel Ernest Douglas Money CIE Gurkha Rifles, Indian Army
- Lieutenant-Colonel Frank William Frederick Johnson, Royal Sussex Regiment

For valuable services rendered in connection with Military Operations in Egypt —

- Major Alexander Adams, Royal Engineers
- Lieutenant-Colonel Allan Armstrong, Wiltshire Regiment
- Major Frederic Ellis Ashton, York and Lancaster Regiment
- Temp. 2nd Lieutenant Thomas Edward Bayne-Jardine, attd. Camel Trans Corps
- Lieutenant-Colonel Hope Biddulph, Royal Field Artillery
- Major Henry Jackson Butchart, Yeomanry
- Captain and Brevet Major Geoffrey Alexander Campbell, Army Service Corps
- Major James Donald Campbell, Royal Engineers
- Captain Herbert William Carson Royal Army Medical Corps
- Rev. William Wilson Cash, Army Chaplains' Department
- Major John Nevile Chaworth-Musters, Yeomanry
- Major Arthur Montagu Colvile, Royal Garrison Artillery
- Lieutenant-Colonel Edward Forbes Cooke-Hurle, Somerset Light Infantry
- Captain and Brevet Major Martin Crawley-Boevey MC Duke of Cornwall's Light Infantry
- Lieutenant Albert Edward Harry Meyer Archibald, Lord Dalmeny MC Grenadier Guards
- Temp. Captain George Aubrey Faulkner, Royal Field Artillery
- Lieutenant-Colonel Charles Alexander Fisher, Army Ordnance Depot
- Temp. Captain Annesley de Rinzy Gordon, attd. Camel Corps
- Temp. Captain Archibald Glen MC Royal Engineers
- Captain Frederic Snowden Hammond, London Regiment
- Temp. Captain James Hay, Spec. List
- Major Robert Wynne Henderson, Indian Cavalry
- Temp. Captain Charles Martin Hickley, Royal Engineers
- Major Charles Wood Hill, West India Regiment
- Major John Meredith Hulton, Royal Sussex Regiment
- Major and Brevet Lieutenant-Colonel Richard Carey Jellicoe, Army Service Corps
- Major and Brevet Lieutenant-Colonel Pierce Charles Joyce, Connaught Rangers
- Major George Chester Douglas Kempson, East Lancashire Regiment, attd. Army Ordnance Depot
- Lieutenant-Colonel William Kinnear, Royal Field Artillery
- Captain James William Bainbridge Landon, Army Service Corps
- Captain Thomas Bramley Layton Royal Army Medical Corps
- Major John Wilson Leitch Royal Army Medical Corps
- Lieutenant-Colonel James Lightbody, Royal Field Artillery
- Major and Brevet Lieutenant-Captain Hugh William McCall, Yorkshire Regiment
- Lieutenant-Colonel Angus John McNeill, Yeomanry
- Captain and Brevet Major Christian George Maude MC Royal Fusiliers
- Rev. Hugh Craig Meeke Army Chaplains' Department
- Rev. Robert Henry Nash, Army Chaplains' Department
- Lieutenant-Colonel Joseph George Needham, Army Service Corps
- Captain and Brevet Major Rex Hamilton Osborne MC Hussars
- Major and Brevet Lieutenant-Colonel Vere Lorraine Nuthall Pearson, Middlesex Regiment
- Temp. Lieutenant Edward Townley Peel MC Wiltshire Regiment
- Temp. Major Maurice Portal, Remount Service
- Captain Harry Edwin Powell, Army Veterinary Corps
- Captain Percy James Simpson FRCVS Army Veterinary Corps
- Captain Oskar Teichmann MC Royal Army Medical Corps
- Major Arthur Felix Thomas, Manchester Regiment
- Lieutenant-Colonel Hugh Wright Thomson Royal Army Medical Corps
- Major Oliver Miles Torkington, Scottish Rifles
- Captain Sidney Joseph Williams, Army Veterinary Corps
- Major Harold Rene Wilson, Royal Field Artillery
- Lieutenant-Colonel Sir Mathew Richard Henry Wilson Bt CSI Yeomanry
- Major Edward Woolmer MC Lancashire Fusiliers

Australian Imperial Force

- Major Percival John Bailey, Light Horse Regiment
- Major Thomas Joseph Daly, Light Horse Regiment
- Lieutenant-Colonel Arthur Lacy Dawson, Army Medical Corps
- Major Harold Albert Duckett White, Light Horse Regiment

New Zealand Force

- Major Charles Ernest Hercus, Medical Corps
- Major Stephen Charles Phillips Nicholls, Staff Corps

For distinguished service in connection with Military Operations in Salonika —

- Hon. Lieutenant-Colonel Richard Fuller Barber, Army Ordnance Depot
- Capt. Hon. Rupert Edward Selborne Barrington, Yeomanry
- Major Daniel Burges, Gloucestershire Regiment
- Temp. Major Aubrey Ernest Burt, Oxfordshire and Buckinghamshire Light Infantry
- Major Hugh Frederick Byrne, Army Ordnance Depot
- Temp. Major James Elliot Cairnes, Royal Field Artillery
- Major Leslie Humphreys Church, Army Service Corps
- Major Ivor Staveley Cobbe Royal Garrison Artillery
- Major and Brevet Lieutenant-Colonel William James Norman Cooke-Collis, Royal Irish Rifles
- Temp. Major Maurice Rhynd Dickson, Royal Scots Fusiliers
- Temp. Major Herbert Dippie, Worcestershire Regiment
- Temp. Major Harry George Ditcham, Gen. List
- Major John David Beveridge Erskine, Manchester Regiment
- Major and Brevet Lieutenant-Colonel Julian Fane, Gloucestershire Regiment
- Major George Forbes Carpenter Finch, Royal Garrison Artillery
- James Lemprière Ormidale Barcaple Findlay, Army Chaplains' Department
- Temp. Major William Veasey Franklin, South Wales Borderers
- Major Frederick Joseph Garland Royal Army Medical Corps
- Major Edward Chase Hall, Royal Field Artillery
- Captain Isidor Morris Heilbron (later Ian Heilbron), Army Service Corps
- Major and Brevet Lieutenant-Colonel Charles Ernest Hollins, Lincolnshire Regiment
- Captain and Brevet Major Benjamin Johnson Royal Army Medical Corps
- Temp. Major Charles Godfrey Jones, Welsh Regiment
- Major Horace Augustus Kirby MC Royal Garrison Artillery
- Captain and Brevet Major George Riland Francis Leverson, Northumberland Fusiliers
- Lieutenant-Colonel Montagu Marmion Lowsley, Royal Army Medical Corps
- Captain Hector Graham Gordon Mackenzie Royal Army Medical Corps
- Captain John Munro Mackenzie, Royal Scots
- Major and Brevet Lieutenant-Colonel William Miller, Middlesex Regiment
- Major Reginald Henry Phillimore, Royal Engineers
- Major Henry Chambre Ponsonby MC King's Royal Rifle Corps
- Captain John Rae, Army Veterinary Corps
- Temp. Captain Charles Percival Rea, Royal Scots Fusiliers
- Temp. Major Oswald Arthur Scott, Hampshire Regiment
- Major Allen Aldwin Soames, King's Royal Rifle Corps
- Captain and Brevet Major Alexander Craven Vicary MC Gloucestershire Regiment
- Major Guy Bernard Campbell Ward, South Wales Borderers
- Captain Hildred Edward Webb-Bowen, Royal Engineers
- Lieutenant-Colonel John Robert Whait Royal Army Medical Corps
- Major Ralph Koper White, Royal Army Medical Corps
- Major George Hamilton Wilkinson, Supply and Transport Corps, Indian Army
- Temp. Major Harold Waterlow Wiltshire Royal Army Medical Corps
- Temp. Major Edward Francis Broome Witts, Gloucestershire Regiment
- Major and Brevet Lieutenant-Colonel Harold Charles Webster Hale Wortham, Royal Irish Fusiliers
- Major Clifton Vincent Reynolds Wright, South Wales Borderers
- Major Philip Caynton Yonge, Essex Regiment

For distinguished services rendered with the British Forces on the Mediterranean Line of Communications —

- Captain Thomas Williams Lloyd, Liverpool Regiment, Royal Engineers

For valuable services rendered in connection with Military Operations in Italy —

- Temp Captain James Abbey MC Royal Field Artillery
- Captain and Brevet Major Arthur Nugent Acland MC Duke of Cornwall's Light Infantry
- Major Ronald Forbes Adam, Royal Horse Artillery
- Major William Adam, Worcestershire Regiment
- Temp Major William Moore Alpine, King's Royal Rifle Corps
- Lieutenant-Colonel and Brevet Colonel Sir Dalrymple Arbuthnot Bt CMG Royal Artillery
- Major Arthur Barwick Lloyd Baker, Oxfordshire & Buckinghamshire Light Infantry
- Captain and Brevet Major John Blount-Dinwiddie, Army Service Corps
- Major Charles Barnard Bonham, Royal Engineers
- Major Charles Edward Dunscomb Bridge MC Royal Artillery
- Captain David Adye Buchan, Royal Field Artillery
- Captain Robert Moyle Burmann MC East Lancashire Regiment
- Major Richard Whiteside Burnyeat, Royal Field Artillery
- Captain Charles Sidney Burt, South Staffordshire Regiment
- Major The Hon. Arthur Claud Spencer Chichester, Irish Guards
- Temp Major James William Sabben Clare, Army Service Corps
- Major Stewart Coats, Argyll & Sutherland Highlanders
- Major Henry Crawshay, Worcestershire Regiment
- Lieutenant-Colonel William Chapman Croly, Royal Army Medical Corps
- Lieutenant Raymond Howarth Cutting MC Devonshire Regiment, attd. Machine Gun Corps
- Captain Harold Darby, Army Service Corps
- Major George Strachan John Fuller-Eberle, Royal Engineers
- Temp Major Alfred James Fraser, Army Service Corps
- Major Henry John Gordon Gale, Royal Garrison Artillery
- Major Guy Edward Augustus Granet MC Royal Field Artillery
- Captain Thomas Arthur Green Royal Army Medical Corps
- Captain Leonard Arthur Hawes MC Royal Artillery
- Temp Major George Rainald Henniker-Gotley, Machine Gun Corps
- Quartermaster and Hon. Major Ernest Thomas Hynes
- Captain Hon. Ronald Dudley Kitson MC West Yorkshire Regiment
- Temp Captain Thomas Leslie Longhurst, Army Service Corps
- Temp Major William Keith Maclachlan, Northumberland Fusiliers
- Captain Forbes Lankester McNaughton, Royal Field Artillery
- Major Frederick Lewis Makgill-Crichton-Maitland, Gordon Highlanders
- Captain John Campbell Maclntyre Matheson, Cameron Highlanders, attd. Machine Gun Corps
- Captain John Carew Meredith, Royal Garrison Artillery
- Captain George Swiney Miller, Royal Warwickshire Regiment
- Major Martin Joseph Minogue MC East Surrey Regiment
- Major Patteson Womersley Nickalls, Yeomanry
- Captain Richard William Oldfield MC Royal Field Artillery
- Temp Captain Wilfred John Pearson MC Royal Army Medical Corps
- Captain Richard Persse MC South Staffordshire Regiment
- Captain Wilfrid Gould Pidsley, London Regiment
- Captain Frederick Spencer Pountney, London Regiment
- Temp Major Oscar Stanley Pratt, Middlesex Regiment
- Captain and Brevet Major Harold St George Schomberg, East Surrey Regiment
- Major Thomas Henry Sebag-Montefiore MC Royal Horse Artillery
- Major William Thomson Sheppard, Army Ordnance Depot
- Lieutenant Joseph Snape MC South Staffordshire Regiment, attd. Honourable Artillery Company
- Major Harold Smurthwaite Kemplay Snowdon, Royal Garrison Artillery
- Captain Harry Strevens MC Royal Warwickshire Regiment, empld. Devonshire Regiment
- Captain Douglas Hervey Talbot MC Lancers
- Lieutenant Arnold John Thompson MC Scots Guards
- Temp Lieutenant Henry Edward Verey
- Major John Thornhill Wallace MC Royal Artillery
- Major Hardress William Lucius Waller MC Royal Artillery
- Captain and Brevet Major Eric Stuart White, Army Service Corps
- Lieutenant Harry Willans MC Bedfordshire Regiment

For services rendered in connection with Military Operations in France and Flanders —

- Lieutenant-Colonel Francis Adams, Indian Cavalry
- Temp Major William James Allen, Royal Irish Rifles
- Captain Harry Surtees Altham MC King's Royal Rifle Corps
- Temp Lieutenant Herbert Courtenay Atkin-Berry MC General List
- Temp Captain Richard Nunn Aylward MC Royal Engineers
- Temp Major Bernard Granville, Baker, Yorkshire Regiment
- Major George Boyd Balfour, Royal Lancaster Regiment
- Lieutenant Charles James Prior Ball MC Royal Artillery, attd. Royal Horse Artillery
- Temp Captain Augustine Barker MC Royal Field Artillery
- Major Thomas Ashley Barren, Royal Army Medical Corps
- Captain Herbert Barter, Royal Horse Artillery
- Major Richard Lionel Barton, Royal Garrison Artillery
- Temp Captain William Major Batchelor MC Royal Engineers
- Major Herbert Copeland Cary Batten, Dorsetshire Regiment
- Major and Brevet Lieutenant-Colonel Lionel Seton Bayley, Royal Garrison Artillery
- Captain Cuthbert Theodore Baynham, Royal Field Artillery
- Captain Reginald Lindsay Benson MC Lancers
- Temp Lieutenant-Colonel Samuel Bingham, Liverpool Regiment
- Temp Lieutenant-Colonel Julius Guthlac Birch, King's Royal Rifle Corps
- Captain Percy Yates Birch, Royal Garrison Artillery
- Temp Captain Thomas Griffin Bird, Royal Engineers
- Major Gerald Halsey Birkett, South Wales Borderers.
- Hon. Major William Samuel George Bishop, Army Ordnance Depot
- Captain William Blackwood Royal Army Medical Corps
- Temp Major Thomas Wootton Blakeway, Army Service Corps
- Captain Algernon Lothian Bonham-Carter, King's Royal Rifle Corps
- Major Alan George Barwys Bourne MVO Royal Marine Artillery
- Temp Major William Allan Bowen, Royal Lancaster Regiment
- Major Gerald Charles Jervis Brady, Royal Field Artillery
- Lieutenant John Breckon, Rifle Brigade
- Temp Captain George Bremner MC Royal Engineers
- Temp Lieutenant Rawdon Briggs MC Royal Engineers
- Lieutenant Victor Charles Brind, Royal Field Artillery
- Hon. Major Edwin John James Britton, Army Ordnance Depot
- Captain John Grahame Brockbank, Army Service Corps, seconded to Tank Corps
- Captain Robert Weston Brooke MC Yeomanry
- Major Herbert Devenish Lennon Brown, Royal Garrison Artillery
- Lieutenant-Colonel Alfred Percy Browne, Indian Cavalry
- Lieutenant-Colonel Gerald Trevor Bruce, Yeomanry, Lincolnshire Regiment
- Captain Edgar James Bernard Buchanan, Royal Engineers
- Temp Captain John Buckley MC General List
- Captain Captain Francis William Bullock-Marsham MC Hussars
- Major Duncan Elidor Campbell, Yeomanry
- Temp Captain Murtough Carbery MC Royal Field Artillery
- Major Reginald Edward Cecil, Lancers
- Captain Melrose Thomas Chapman, Army Service Corps
- Temp Captain William Adam Chapman
- Temp Captain Major and Brevet Lieutenant-Colonel William Gwyther Charles, Essex Regiment
- Captain and Brevet Major Julius Francis Chenevix-Trench, Northumberland Fusiliers
- Major John Strange Spencer Churchill, Yeomanry
- Captain Colin Clarke FRCS Royal Army Medical Corps
- Temp Major Geoffrey Shaw Clayton, Liverpool Regiment
- Major William Boyer Clayton, Army Service Corps
- Temp Major Norman Benson Clegg, Army Service Corps
- Major Shuckburgh Upton Lucas-Clements, Royal Irish Fusiliers
- Lieutenant-Colonel Charles William Cochrane, Army Service Corps
- Temp Major William Hewett Coles, Middlesex Regiment
- Major Gilbert Faraday Collett, Gloucestershire Regiment
- Lieutenant-Colonel William Fellowes Collins, Dragoons
- Lieutenant-Colonel Edward Walter Comyn, Royal Garrison Artillery
- Temp Captain James Alphonsus Conway MC Royal Army Medical Corps
- Captain Rupert Ramsay Copeland, Royal Field Artillery
- Major Cecil Uvedale Corbett, Yeomanry
- Major Garnet Robert de la Cour Corbett, Royal Garrison Artillery
- Lieutenant Geoffrey Robert Josceline Corbett, Coldstream Guards
- Major Harold John Couchman MC Royal Engineers
- Lieutenant-Colonel John Coulson, Army Service Corps
- Captain Ernest Marshall Cowell FRCS Royal Army Medical Corps
- Captain and Brevet Major William James Cranston, North Staffordshire Regiment
- Major Robert Quentin Craufurd, Royal Scots Fusiliers
- Lieutenant-Colonel Bertram Edward Crocker, Welsh Regiment
- Temp Major Cecil Howe Cropper MC Royal Engineers
- Captain Elward Guy Kynaston Cross, Hussars
- Major Whitworth Charles Crosse, Army Service Corps
- Captain John Durnford Crosthwaite MC London Regiment, Norfolk Regiment
- Alan Gordon Cunningham MC Royal Field Artillery
- Captain Francis William Murray Cunningham Royal Army Medical Corps
- Lieutenant Edward Curran MC Royal Field Artillery
- Major James Fairly Daly, Highland Light Infantry, Gloucestershire Regiment
- Major Charles George Francis Davidson MC Royal Garrison Artillery
- Captain Paul Victor Davidson, Royal Warwickshire Regiment
- Temp Captain John Wharton Lloyd Davies MC Royal Engineers
- Temp Captain Richard Howell Davies, Royal Engineers
- Major Henry Gordon Dean, Lincolnshire Regiment
- Temp Captain Harold Henry de Laessoe MC General List
- Temp Captain Leonce Delphin MC Royal Engineers
- Lieutenant-Colonel Percy Theodosius Denis de Vitré, Royal Engineers
- Major Edgar John de Pentheny O'Kelly, Royal Welsh Fusiliers
- Major William Chester Dixon, Leicestershire Regiment
- Captain Samuel Henry Doake, Royal Field Artillery
- Captain James Jardine Dobie, Hussars
- Lieutenant-Colonel John Graham Dooner, Royal Field Artillery
- Major Malcolm Gordon Douglas MC Honourable Artillery Company
- Temp Major Charles Child Dowding MC Welsh Regiment
- Temp Captain Ralph Evelyn Drake-Brockman, Royal Army Medical Corps
- Major and Brevet Lieutenant-Colonel Arthur Houssemayne du Boulay, Royal Engineers
- Major Augustus Cecil Hare Duke, late Royal Garrison Artillery
- Temp Captain Robert Norman Duke MC General List
- Major Thomas Edwin Durie MC Royal Field Artillery
- Major William Allaire Edmeades, Royal Garrison Artillery
- Major Cecil Aubrey Eeles, Royal Field Artillery
- Captain Charles Hertel Egerton MC Royal Engineers
- Captain Henry Cecil Elwes MVO Scots Guards, attd. Royal Irish Rifles
- Lieutenant-Colonel Abraham England, Army Service Corps
- Major Arthur Kenlis Lord Farnham, North Irish Horse, attd. Royal Inniskilling Fusiliers
- Major Arthur Edward Flynn Fawcus MC Manchester Regiment, attd. North Staffordshire Regiment
- Captain and Brevet Major Arthur Alston Fenn, Royal Fusiliers, and Intell. Corps
- Major Francis Augustus Ferguson, Royal Engineers
- Major Hubert Wogan Festing, Durham Light Infantry, attd. Yorkshire Light Infantry
- Lieutenant-Colonel William Edward Foggie Royal Army Medical Corps
- Captain Vincent Tennyson Randle Ford, York and Lancaster Regiment, empld. Northumberland Fusiliers
- Major and Brevet Lieutenant-Colonel Richard Foster Carter Foster, Royal Marine Artillery
- Captain and Brevet Major Claude Howard Stanley Frankau FRCS Royal Army Medical Corps
- Captain and Brevet Major Harold Edmund Franklyn MC Yorkshire Regiment
- Captain Harry Read Gadd MC Suffolk Regiment, attd. Nottinghamshire & Derbyshire Regiment
- Lieutenant-Colonel James William Garden, Royal Field Artillery
- Temp Captain Frederick diaries Gavin, Army Veterinary Corps
- Major George German, Leicestershire Regiment
- Captain Joseph Holmes Gettins, Army Service Corps
- Major Willie Roland Gibson, Army Service Corps
- Major John Maxwell Gillatt, Royal Scots
- Major Geoffrey Goyer Gilligan, Argyll & Sutherland Highlanders, attd. Nottinghamshire & Derbyshire Regiment
- Lieutenant Richard Kenneth Glascodine MC London Regiment
- Captain and Brevet Major Guy de Courcy Glover MC South Staffordshire Regiment
- Major Walter Hugh Godsal MC Durham Light Infantry
- Major George Joseph Power Goodwin, Royal Engineers
- Major George Gould, Indian Cavalry
- Captain William Gray, Army Service Corps
- Temp Captain Samuel Sowray Greaves MC Royal Army Medical Corps
- Captain and Brevet Major Wolseley de Haga Haig, Royal Engineers
- Major Richard Collis Hallowes Royal Army Medical Corps
- Major Hugh St. George Hamersley, Royal Garrison Artillery
- Captain Gerard Montague Hamilton, Royal Field Artillery
- Major Sandford Raymond Alers Hankey, South Irish Horse
- Captain Francis Kyle Hardy, York and Lancaster Regiment
- Major Wilfred Harris-St. John, Royal Welsh Fusiliers
- Major Leonard Herbert Pocock Hart, Lincolnshire Regiment, attd. York and Lancaster Regiment
- Temp Major Charles Francis Hawkins MC Tank Corps
- Captain Rowland Charles Hawkins, Honourable Artillery Company
- Temp Captain Ronald Bruce Hay, Royal Garrison Artillery
- Captain Robert Evelyn Manners Heathcote, Royal Scots
- Temp Lieutenant Malcolm Heddle, Royal Garrison Artillery
- Captain Robert Hemphill, Royal Army Medical Corps
- Hon. Major John Acheson Henderson, Hussars
- Major Charles Gwynn Hetherington, Royal Garrison Artillery
- Captain Frances Bland Hewson MC York and Lancaster Regiment
- Captain Francis John Hext MC Royal Field Artillery
- Major Eustace Hill, Yeomanry
- Major Geoffrey Noel Hill, Royal Garrison Artillery
- Lieutenant Herbert Hobday MC Royal Field Artillery
- Major Ernest Charles Hodgson, Indian Medical Service
- Major Richard Carlyle Holme, Royal Garrison Artillery
- Major Harold James Holness, Army Veterinary Corps
- Major John Urmson Hope, Royal Garrison Artillery
- Lieutenant Thomas Horton, Royal Garrison Artillery
- Major and Brevet Lieutenant-Colonel Alan John Hunter MC King's Royal Rifle Corps
- Captain Richard Devas Hunter, Scottish Rifles
- Major Edward Maitland Hutchinson, Royal Field Artillery
- Lieutenant-Colonel Arnold Irwin, Northumberland Fusiliers
- Captain Reginald Strutt Irwin, Royal Highlanders, attd. Border Regiment
- Captain Thomas Ivey, Royal Irish Rifles
- Temp Major Albert John Stanley James MC Royal Welsh Fusiliers
- Major Montagu Irvine Gedoin Jenkins, Devonshire Regiment
- Major Harry Johnson, North Staffordshire Regiment
- Captain Samuel Gordon Johnson MC South Staffordshire Regiment attd. Royal Engineers
- Temp Captain Albert Jones MC Royal Army Medical Corps
- Captain Cedric la Touche Turner Jones MC Royal Engineers
- Major Douglas Champion Jones, Royal Engineers
- Major Oscar John Forrestall Keatinge, North Staffordshire Regiment
- Captain John Philip Kellett MC London Regiment
- Temp Major Frank Pery Knox, Army Service Corps
- Major Francis John Langdon, Liverpool Regiment
- Captain Henry George Charles, Viscount Lascelles, Grenadier Guards
- Major Harold Futvoye Lea, York Regiment
- Lieutenant-Colonel Francis Holdsworth Leather, Army Service Corps
- Temp Major Walter Henry Levy, Army Service Corps
- Major Rowland Philip Lewis, Royal Army Medical Corps
- Major Creighton Hutchinson Lindsay CMG Royal Army Medical Corps
- Captain and Brevet Major Edward Prince Lloyd, Lincolnshire Regiment, attd. Northumberland Fusiliers
- Major Reginald George Albert Lloyd, South Lancashire Regiment
- Captain Ambrose Lorne Lockwood MC Royal Army Medical Corps
- Captain and Brevet Major Albert de Lande Long, Gordon Highlanders
- Captain Thomas Martin Lowry MC Duke of Cornwall's Light Infantry, attd. Royal Engineers
- Captain Thomas Gabriel Lumley Lumley-Smith, Lancers
- Major William McCracken, Argyll & Sutherland Highlanders
- Lieutenant James Alexander Macdonald, Royal Field Artillery
- Captain Thomas Wilson MacDonald, Border Regiment
- Major Claud Macfie, Seaforth Highlanders
- Major Raoul Donald Carnegy Macleod, Lancers, Indian Army
- Captain Alan David Macpherson MC Royal Field Artillery
- Captain Arthur Norman Roy McNeill, Royal Army Medical Corps
- Captain and Brevet Major Gordon Nevil Macready MC Royal Engineers
- Major George Ramsay Maitland, Indian Cavalry
- Major Thomas Harry Saunders Marchant, Hussars
- Captain Francis Alleyne Marr MC Cambridgeshire Regiment
- Major Archibald Victor Powell Martin, Wiltshire Regiment
- Captain Edwyn Sandys Dawes Martin MC Dragoon Guards
- Captain James Hall Martin MC Royal Lancaster Regiment
- Major Ernest Albert Churchward Matthews, Indian Medical Service
- Major John William Henry Maturin, Army Service Corps
- Major Stephen Mead, Royal Garrison Artillery
- Major Henry Edward Medlicott. Indian Cavalry
- Lieutenant-Colonel Frank Middleton, Royal Field Artillery
- Major Kenneth Eugene Milford, Royal Artillery
- Captain Sinclair Miller MC Royal Army Medical Corps
- Major Percy Reynolds Mitchell, Royal Garrison Artillery
- Captain Malcolm Edward Moir, Royal Field Artillery
- Temp Captain Harry Morton MC Nottinghamshire & Derbyshire Regiment
- Major Altham Leonard Moulton-Barrett, Dorsetshire Regiment
- Lieutenant John Spencer Muirhead MC Royal Engineers
- Major Aldwin Montgomery Munby, Border Regiment
- Captain Cyril Alexander George Octavius Murray, King's Own Scottish Borderers
- Major Joseph Nail, Royal Field Artillery
- Lieutenant-Colonel Charles Cowan Newnham, Indian Army
- Major Thomas Cochrane Newton, Royal Field Artillery
- Major St. John Richardson Nicholson, Royal Garrison Artillery
- Major Fergus Brinsley Nixon, Royal Inniskilling Fusiliers
- Temp Hon. Captain Humphrey Nockolds, Royal Army Medical Corps
- Temp Major Henry Lowcay Norcock, Army Service Corps
- Temp Captain Reginald Lewis Nunn, Royal Engineers
- Lieutenant-Colonel William Oddie, West Yorkshire Regiment
- Major Edwin Herbert O'Reilly-Blackwood MC Royal Garrison Artillery
- Captain John Marcus William O'Rorke, Cavalry, Indian Army
- Temp Major Thomas George Pace, Army Service Corps
- Captain Henry Wellington Tuthill Palmer, Royal Engineers
- Lieutenant-Colonel Hugh Robert Palmer, Royal Garrison Artillery
- Lieutenant John Stanley Parsons, Royal Engineers
- Temp Captain Arthur Alexander Adam Paterson MC Royal Field Artillery
- Temp Captain Cecil Herbert Peck MC Royal Field Artillery
- Major Ivan Cockayne Pery-Knox-Gore MC Royal Field Artillery
- Temp Captain Edward Darley Powell MC Royal Engineers
- Lieutenant-Colonel John Powell Royal Army Medical Corps
- Major Noel Percival Richard Preeston, Royal Field Artillery
- Captain Humphrey Hollond Prideaux MC Northumberland Fusiliers
- Temp Major Charles Raymond Radclyffe, Army Service Corps, attd. Tank Corps
- Major Philip Rashleigh, Royal Garrison Artillery
- Major Robert Amyatt Ray, Royal Lancaster Regiment
- Captain John Guildford Redfern, East Yorkshire Regiment
- Temp Major Evan Thomas Rees MC South Wales Borderers
- Major Julian Yorke Hayter Ridout, Royal Field Artillery
- Major Thomas Charles Lockhart Rivis, Army Service Corps
- Captain Gordon McMahon Robertson, North Staffordshire Regiment, attd. Royal Dublin Fusiliers
- Temp Lieutenant Frederick Wilfred Robinson MC Machine Gun Corps
- Temp Captain Arthur Leslie Rogers, Royal Field Artillery
- Temp Captain Reginald George Royle, Yorkshire Light Infantry
- Temp Captain Charles Hermann Schmettau Runge MC General List
- Captain Curtois Fraser Maxwell Norwood Ryan MC Royal Engineers
- Major Rupert Sumner Ryan, Royal Field Artillery
- Captain Gerald Robert Sandeman MC Border Regiment
- Temp Major Reginald Ernest Sanders, Army Service Corps
- Major Arthur Johnson Savage, Royal Engineers
- Surg.-Major Arthur Wilson Shea, Nottinghamshire & Derbyshire Regiment
- Lieutenant-Colonel William George Simpson CMG London Regiment
- Major Thomas Henry Limerick Spaight, Royal Engineers
- Temp Lieutenant-Colonel Kenneth Robert Napier Speir, Royal Engineers
- Major Alexander William Ramsay Sprot, Argyll & Sutherland Highlanders
- Temp Captain Matthew Reginald Steel MC Northumberland Fusiliers
- Major John Robert Stevenson, Army Veterinary Corps
- Temp Captain Henry French Stephens MC Royal Field Artillery
- Major Harold William Puzey Stokes, Army Service Corps
- Temp Major Christopher Reynolds Stone MC late Royal Fusiliers
- Major John Hartrick Stone, Army Ordnance Depot
- Temp Captain Arthur Hubert Street, Royal Garrison Artillery
- Major Edward Verrinder Sydenham, Royal Warwickshire Regiment
- Maj, Lyster Robert Edward Waters Taylor, Royal Garrison Artillery
- Captain James Tennant, South Lancashire Regiment, attd. Army Corps of Clerks
- Captain James Gilbert Thompson MC Liverpool Regiment
- Captain Vivian Home Thomson MC Royal Field Artillery
- 2nd Lieutenant Noel Shipley Thornton, Rifle Brigade.
- Captain Meredith Denison Townsend, Royal Field Artillery
- Major George Courtenay Tracy, Duke of Cornwall's Light Infantry
- Lieutenant-Colonel Alan Gordon Troup, Army Service Corps
- Major Alan Charles Turner, Royal Army Medical Corps
- Captain Warrington Royds Tylden-Wright, Hussars
- Major John Ellis Viccars, Leicestershire Regiment
- Major George Crespigny Brabazon, Baron Vivian, Yeomanry
- Captain Richard Henry Waddy, Somerset Light Infantry
- Captain Ernest Wentworth Wade Royal Army Medical Corps
- Temp Major Clement William Waite, East Yorkshire Regiment
- Major Arthur Dunbar Walker, Royal Engineers
- Temp Lieutenant-Colonel Bertram James Walker, Royal Sussex Regiment
- Temp Captain Arnold Horace Santo Waters MC Royal Engineers
- Major Douglas Percival Watson Royal Army Medical Corps
- Captain Thomas Hovenden Watson MC Worcestershire Regiment, attd. Nottinghamshire & Derbyshire Regiment
- Major Charles Ramsay White, Yorkshire Regiment
- Temp Major James Wightman MC East Surrey Regiment
- Temp Captain Gerard William Williams MC Royal Engineers
- Major Arthur Peere Williams-Freeman, Duke of Cornwall's Light Infantry
- Captain Alfred John Williamson, Royal Army Medical Corps
- Captain Edward Willson, Royal Garrison Artillery
- Major Cyril Francis Baronneau Winterscale, Shropshire Light Infantry
- Captain Rupert Bryson Withers, Royal Garrison Artillery
- Temp Captain Frederick Arthur Woodcock, Royal Field Artillery
- Temp Major Ernest Trevor Langebear Wright, Army Service Corps
- Captain Geoffrey Machel Hungerford Wright MC Royal Irish Fusiliers
- Captain Sydney Campbell Wright, Royal Field Artillery
- Captain Robert Rennie Yalland, Leicestershire Regiment
- Major George Alexander Yool, South Staffordshire Regiment, attd. Leicestershire Regiment
- Major James Maclaren Young, Royal Lancaster Regiment

Canadian Force

- Lieutenant-Colonel George Joseph Boyce, Army Medical Corps
- Major Jeffrey Harper Bull, Infantry
- Major George Lynch Cameron, Infantry
- Major William Kellman Chandler, Infantry
- Captain Arthur Paul Chattell, Infantry
- Major Edward John Cleary; Army Service Corps
- Lieutenant-Colonel Frederick Minden Cole, Garrison Artillery
- Major John Cormack Craig, Railway Troops
- Major Ashton Bluett Cutcliffe, Army Veterinary Corps
- Lieutenant-Colonel Anson Scott Donaldson, Army Medical Corps
- Major Archer Fortescue Duguid, Field Artillery
- Lieutenant-Colonel Archibald Earchman, Railway Troops
- Major Charles Edgar Edgett, Army Veterinary Corps
- Major Douglas Stewart Ellis, Engineers
- Major Charles Flint, Railway Construction Corps.
- Hon. Captain Rev. Francis Laurence French, Chaplains' Service
- Major Norman Gentles, Infantry
- Major George Herbert Rae Gibson, Army Medical Corps
- Lieutenant-Colonel Archibald Lome Campbell Gilday
- Lieutenant-Colonel Edward Theodore Barclay Gillmore, Field Artillery
- Major William David Greer, Army Service Corps
- Lieutenant-Colonel John Nisbet Gunn, Army Medical Corps
- Lieutenant-Colonel Colin Clark Harbottle, Infantry
- Lieutenant-Colonel Joseph Hayes, Army Medical Corps
- Major Hugh James Heasley, Army Service Corps
- Major Daniel Hillman, Engineers
- Major Albert Ernest Humphrey, Cyclist Corps
- Lieutenant-Colonel William George Hurdman, Field Artillery
- Lieutenant-Colonel Daniel Paul Kappele, Army Medical Corps
- Lieutenant-ColonelWalter Bernard Kingsmill, Pioneers
- Major Gordon Ernest Leighton, Infantry
- Lieutenant-Colonel Ibbotson Leonard, Cavalry
- Major Theodore Adolf Lomer, Army Medical Corps
- Major Atwood Talbot Mackay, Field Artillery
- Major Robert Carlyle Mackenzie, Infantry
- Major Neil Bruce Maclean, Garrison Artillery
- Major Walter Edward Maxfield, Mounted Rifles
- Major Lawrence Walter Miller, Mounted Rifles
- Major Arnott Grier Mordy, Infantry
- Major William Neilson, Infantry
- Lieutenant-Colonel Lafayette Harry Nelles, Infantry
- Major Alexander Thomas Paterson, Field Artillery
- Lieutenant-Colonel John Jenkin Penhale, Field Artillery
- Major Henry Edward Pense, Infantry
- Major Norman Dundas Perry, Cent. Ont. Regiment
- Major William Gordon Peterson, Quebec Regiment
- Lieutenant-Colonel John George Piercey, Field Artillery
- Major Thomas Head Raddall, Infantry
- Major William Rhoades MC Mounted Rifles
- Major Norman Roy Robertson, Engineers
- Major Cecil Bell Russell, Engineers
- Major Charles Greatley Saunders, Army Veterinary Corps
- Major John Nelson Semmens, Infantry
- Major Wallace James Sharpe, Cavalry
- Major George Wyman Shearer, Field Artillery
- Lieutenant-Colonel James Crossley Stewart, Field Artillery
- Major Allan Elsworth Taylor, Infantry
- Brigadier-General Herbert Cyril Thacker CMG Field Artillery
- Lieutenant-Colonel John Thomas Connolly Thompson, Infantry
- Lieutenant-Colonel Hugh Crawford Walkem, Pioneers
- Major Arthur Leslie Walker MC Infantry
- Major Donald Alexander White, Field Artillery
- Major Edward Alexander Cumberland Wilcox, Infantry

Australian Force

- Major Leslie Ellis Beavis, Field Artillery Brigade
- Major William Henry Berry, Army Service Corps
- Major Francis Lawrence Bignell, Army Medical Corps
- Major Archibald Clifford Black-low, Machine Gun Corps
- Major John Alexander Brazenor, Army Service Corps
- Lieutenant-Colonel Edward Thomas Brennan MC
- Major Arthur Balfour Douglas Brown, Provost Corps
- Major Athol Frederick Burrett, Infantry
- Major Herbert Richard Byrne, Field Artillery
- Lieutenant-Colonel James Purcell Clark, Int
- Major Arthur Ross Clayton, Army Medical Corps
- Major Norman Clowes MC Field Artillery
- Quartermaster and Hon. Major Frederick William Craig, Infantry
- Major Alan Percy Crisp, Field Artillery
- Major Harold Charles De Low, Field Artillery
- Major Robert Johnstone Donaldson, Engineers
- Major Norman Lockhart Dreyer, Field Artillery
- Major Albert Tange Dunlop, Army Medical Corps
- Major Alexander Arthur Evans MC Field Artillery
- Major Thomas Charles Cann Evans, Army Medical Corps
- Major Lyndhurst Falkiner Giblin, Infantry
- Major Hugh Reginald Hallard, Field Artillery
- Major John Hamilton, Army Service Corps
- Major Samuel Herbert Hancox, Engineers
- Major George Gordon Heslop, Army Veterinary Corps
- Lieutenant-Colonel Stanley George Allen Hindhaugh, Light Horse
- Captain Mervyn John Holmes, Army Medical Corps
- Captain Robert William Hore, Field Artillery
- Lieutenant-Colonel William Edward James, Infantry
- Lieutenant-Colonel William Elphinstone Kay, Army Medical Corps
- Major Reginald George Legge MC Infantry
- Major Donald Stuart Mackenzie, Army Medical Corps
- Lieutenant-Colonel Frederick Arthur Maguire, Army Medical Corps
- Major Douglas Gray Marks MC Infantry
- Lieutenant-Colonel Ernest Edward Martin, Infantry
- Major Robert John Allwright Massie, Infantry
- Major John Newman, Infantry
- Major Harold Ordish, Machine Gun Corps
- Major Douglas Duke Paine, Australian Army Service Corps
- Lieutenant-Colonel Balcombe Quick, Australian Army Medical Corps
- Major Edward Alfred Hall Randall, Artillery
- Colonel Charles Rosenthal, CB CMG Imperial Force
- Major Arthur Bruce Sandford, Field Artillery
- Major Leslie Cyril Sando, Army Service Corps
- Major John Joseph Scanlan, Infantry
- Lieutenant-Colonel Arthur Edmund Shepherd
- Major Walter Jaques Stack, Army Medical Corps
- Major Raymond Augustus Stanley, Engineers
- Major George Alan Vasey, Artillery
- Major Wilfred Vickers, Army Medical Corps
- Major Sydney James Walker, Field Artillery
- Major Blair Anderson Wark, Infantry
- Captain Herbert Frazer Watson MC Infantry
- Lieutenant-Colonel Aubrey Roy Liddon Wiltshire MC Infantry
- Lieutenant-Colonel Henry Douglas Wynter, General List
- Major Herbert Alexander Youden, Infantry

New Zealand Force

- Major Duncan Eric Gardner, Field Artillery
- Major James Binnie Whyte, Army Service Corps
- Major Eric Arthur Widdowson MC
- Major Henry Gordon Wilding, Field Artillery

South African Contingent

- Major George Melville Bennett, Heavy Artillery
- Major Frank Eardley Cochran, Infantry
- Lieutenant-Colonel Frederick Stuart Dawson CMG ADC Infantry
- Lieutenant Sydney Bernard Edwards, Heavy Artillery
- Lieutenant-Colonel Francis George Harvey, Defence Force
- Major Claude Rigby Heenan, Infantry
- Major Herbert Sidney Lamond Hemming, Infantry
- Major Charles Molteno Murray MC

For distinguished services rendered in connection with Military Operations in Russia—

- Lieutenant-Colonel Reginald St. Clair Battine, Indian Cavalry

==== Awarded a Bar to the Distinguished Service Order (DSO*) ====
For valuable services rendered in connection with Military Operations in Egypt —

- Lieutenant-Colonel Edward Halhed Hugh Elliot DSO Royal Field Artillery
- Lieutenant-Colonel William Carmichael Peebles DSO Royal Scots
- Major Edward Harold Wildblood DSO Leinster Regiment

For services rendered in connection with Military Operations in France and Flanders —

- Major Spencer Acklom DSO MC Highland Light Infantry, attd. Northumberland Fusiliers
- Captain and Brevet Major Hon. Eric Octavius Campbell DSO Seaforth Highlanders
- Temp Major Philip Hamond DSO MC Tank Corps (late Coldstream Guards)
- Lieutenant-Colonel Arthur Henry Seton Hart-Synnot DSO East Surrey Regiment
- Major Hon. Evelyn James Hewitt DSO Dorsetshire Regiment, attd. Duke of Cornwall's Light Infantry
- Temp Major Francis Rowley Hill DSO Middlesex Regiment
- Captain William Vernon Lumsden DSO MC Argyll & Sutherland Highlanders, attd. Scottish Rifles
- Captain Arthur Thomas Pitts DSO Royal Army Medical Corps
- Major Edward Harrison Rigg DSO King's Own Yorkshire Light Infantry, attd. Royal Inniskilling Fusiliers
- Major William Digby Stillwell DSO Royal Field Artillery
- Temp Captain Herbert James Tortise DSO Royal West Surrey Regiment
- Major James Walker DSO West Riding Regiment

Canadian Force

- Lieutenant-Colonel Cameron MacPherson Edwards DSO Infantry
- Lieutenant-Colonel Edward Hilliam DSO Nova Scotia Regiment
- Lieutenant-Colonel James Kirkcaldy DSO Infantry
- Lieutenant-Colonel William Smith Latta DSO Infantry
- Lieutenant-Colonel Lionel Frank Page DSO Infantry

For valuable services rendered in connection with Military Operations in Italy —

- Temp Major Anthony Charles Barnes DSO Yorkshire Regiment

=== Distinguished Service Cross (DSC) ===
- Lieutenant Stanley Napier Blackburn RN

=== Military Cross (MC) ===
- Lieutenant Albert Leigh Abbott, Royal Engineers
- Temp Lieutenant Henry Murray Achilles, Royal Field Artillery
- Lieutenant Graham Adam, Royal Engineers
- Temp Captain Edward James Board Akerman, General List
- Temp Captain Wilfred Herbert Alderton, Royal Army Medical Corps
- Temp Captain Ernest Daniel Alexander, Royal Engineers
- Lieutenant Robert Alexander, Royal Garrison Artillery
- Temp Captain Robert Harper Alexander Royal Army Medical Corps
- Temp Lieutenant Geoffrey Cuthbert Allchin, Royal Engineers
- Temp Lieutenant Frederick Cecil Atkin Allday, Tank Corps (formerly Army Service Corps)
- Temp 2nd Lieutenant Harry Gordon Allen, Machine Gun Corps
- Lieutenant Benjamin George Kidston Allsop, Army Service Corps
- Temp Lieutenant Ernest Aspin Almond, Royal Field Artillery
- Temp Captain Herbert Thomas Amy, Royal Field Artillery
- Lieutenant Reginald Charles Andersen, Royal Engineers
- Lieutenant George Boyd Anderson, Royal Field Artillery
- Lieutenant Laurence Robert Dacre Anderson, Royal Field Artillery
- Temp Quartermaster and Hon. Lieutenant Robert J. Anderson, West Yorkshire Regiment
- Captain Robert Pringle Anderson Royal Army Medical Corps
- Captain Claude Lancelot Andrewes, Indian Cavalry
- Lieutenant Alfred Andrews, Nottinghamshire & Derbyshire Regiment
- Temp Quartermaster and Hon. Lieutenant George Samuel Annett, Royal Army Medical Corps
- Temp 2nd Lieutenant Alex Leslie Arnaud, Tank Corps
- Temp Lieutenant Henry Cheriton Arnold, Royal Garrison Artillery
- Temp Lieutenant Charles Gordon Arthur, Royal Field Artillery
- Captain Cecil Ashby, Middlesex Regiment
- Lieutenant Edward Neville Ashe, Manchester Regiment
- Lieutenant George Dyson Aspland, Royal Engineers
- Lieutenant Edgar Raymond Atkins, Royal Field Artillery
- Captain Arthur Neville Austen, Royal Field Artillery
- Temp Captain Fernley Clifford Austin, Welsh Regiment
- Rev. Francis Aveling, Army Chaplains' Department
- Temp 2nd Lieutenant George Edward Backhouse, Machine Gun Corps
- Captain Oswald Felix Baerlein, Army Service Corps
- Captain Kenneth Vernon Bailey, Manchester Regiment
- Temp 2nd Lieutenant Arthur Harold Baker, Tank Corps
- Lance Captain Geoffrey Thomas Baker, Royal Army Medical Corps
- Lieutenant Robert Percival Baker, Royal West Kent Regiment
- 2nd Lieutenant Thomas George Baker, Royal Field Artillery
- Captain Dudley Vere Morley Balders, Suffolk Regiment
- Company Sergeant Major Percy William Baldry MM East Kent Regiment
- Temp Captain Andrew Campbell Balfour, Highland Light Infantry
- Captain Arthur Edmund Ball, Worcestershire Regiment
- Lieutenant William Moses George Ball, Dorsetshire Regiment
- Captain Richard Pitt Ballard Royal Army Medical Corps
- Temp Lieutenant Roy Frederic Balmain, Royal Field Artillery
- Lieutenant Frederick John Baly, Royal Field Artillery
- Temp Lieutenant David Henry Bannerman, Royal Engineers
- Quartermaster Sergeant John Barbour, Royal Irish Fusiliers
- Company Sergeant Major David Barclay DCM Royal Highlanders
- 2nd Lieutenant Edward James Barford, Royal Garrison Artillery
- Quartermaster and Hon. Captain Arthur Barker, Yorkshire Light Infantry
- Lieutenant Cyril Walker Barnard, Yeomanry
- Captain George William Wynne Barnley, Royal Garrison Artillery
- 2nd Lieutenant William Barr, Royal Garrison Artillery
- 2nd Lieutenant Thomas William Bartlett, Royal Garrison Artillery
- Lieutenant Frederick Thomas Bass, Royal Field Artillery
- 2nd Lieutenant William Batcheldor, Leicestershire Regiment
- Temp Captain Stanley Batchelor, Royal Army Medical Corps
- Lieutenant William Herbert Bateman, Royal Engineers
- Lieutenant William Latham Bateson, Royal Engineers
- Temp Captain William David Bathgate, Royal Army Medical Corps
- Temp 2nd Lieutenant Gavin Hector Baxter, Royal Engineers
- Temp Captain Bernard James Lewis Beard, General List
- Temp 2nd Lieutenant John Edmund Beecroft, Tank Corps
- Captain Harold Bell, Royal Lancaster Regiment
- 2nd Lieutenant John Douglas Bell, Royal Field Artillery
- Lieutenant John Henry Bell, Hampshire Regiment
- Lieutenant Edmund Redfern Bennett, Scots Guards, attd. Machine Gun Guards
- Captain Herbert John Bennett, Oxfordshire & Buckinghamshire Light Infantry
- Temp Lieutenant Stephen Gordon Bennett, Royal Engineers
- 2nd Lieutenant Charles Grey Benstead, London Regiment, attd. Tank Corps
- 2nd Lieutenant Albert Berliner, Royal Garrison Artillery
- Temp Lieutenant Alberic Willoughby Bertie, Royal Field Artillery
- Temp Captain Albert Frank Best, Royal Sussex Regiment
- Temp Captain Claude Robert Bicknell, Royal Garrison Artillery
- Captain Martin Stokes Bigwood, Worcestershire Regiment
- Captain George Bingham, Liverpool Regiment
- Lieutenant Thomas Blackburn, Cheshire Regiment
- Lieutenant Reginald Herbert Blake, Royal Engineers
- Captain Kendall Trelawny Blamer, Lancashire Fusiliers
- Lieutenant Valentine Stevens Bland, Royal Field Artillery
- Temp Lieutenant John Boag, Royal Scots Fusiliers
- 2nd Lieutenant Sydney William Boast, South Lancashire Regiment
- Sergeant Major Alfred Bolland, Royal Army Medical Corps
- Captain Thomas Bone, Army Veterinary Corps
- Sergeant Major Adolphe Moulton Boreham, Royal Welsh Fusiliers
- Lieutenant George William Bost, Royal Engineers
- Lieutenant Norman Sandeman Bostock, South Staffordshire Regiment
- Lieutenant Edward Morley Westwood Boughton, Royal Engineers
- Temp Captain Clifford John Boulton, Welsh Regiment
- Captain Stanley Weeks Boulton, Royal Garrison Artillery
- Temp 2nd Lieutenant Harold Bourne, Royal Engineers
- Temp 2nd Lieutenant Reginald Edward Bowes, Royal Field Artillery
- Temp Captain David Drummond Bowie, Shropshire Light Infantry
- Company Sergeant Major Frederic George Bowtell, Machine Gun Corps
- 2nd Lieutenant Kenneth James Box, Yorkshire Light Infantry
- Temp Lieutenant Thomas Boyce MM Royal Inniskilling Fusiliers
- Captain Harold Boyd-Rochfort DSO Lancers
- Captain Edward Thomas Arthur George Boylan, Royal Horse Artillery
- Lieutenant Reginald Basil Brace, Nottinghamshire & Derbyshire Regiment
- Temp Regimental Sergeant Major Arthur Herbert Bradbury, Royal Warwickshire Regiment
- Captain Charles Henry Bradley, Royal Engineers
- Lieutenant Joseph Harold Bradley, Liverpool Regiment
- Lieutenant William Allan Bradley, Durham Light Infantry
- Lieutenant Francis Patrick Bray, Royal Engineers
- Temp Captain Claude Hamilton Brazel, Royal Engineers
- Temp Captain Malcolm Brechin, Royal Garrison Artillery
- 2nd Lieutenant Thomas Bride, Liverpool Regiment
- 2nd Lieutenant Harry Carrington Briggs, Royal Field Artillery
- Quartermaster and Hon. Captain John Broadley, Durham Light Infantry
- Sergeant Major Robert Brock, Gordon Highlanders
- Lieutenant Duncan Reynett Brodie, Scots Guards,
- Lieutenant Frank Brook, Yorkshire Light Infantry
- Lieutenant Francis Napier Broome, Royal Field Artillery
- Quartermaster and Hon. Lieutenant William Thomas Brotherton, Coldstream Guards
- Lieutenant John Brown, Manchester Regiment
- Lieutenant John Carolan Brown, Connaught Rangers
- Lieutenant Richard Roland Brown, Royal Field Artillery
- Temp 2nd Lieutenant Maximilian Herbert Browne, General List
- Captain Henry Montague Browne, London Regiment
- Temp Captain William Brownlie Royal Army Medical Corps
- Temp Captain Charles Walter Gordon Bryan, Royal Army Medical Corps
- Captain Alexander Carruthers Bryson Royal Army Medical Corps
- Temp Lieutenant William Buchanan, Army Cyclist Corps
- Temp Captain Richard Maclean Buckley, Royal Engineers
- Temp 2nd Lieutenant Harold Percy Budge, Tank Corps
- Captain Henry Ion Bulkeley, Royal Engineers
- Temp Lieutenant Ralph Bassett Bullock, Gloucestershire Regiment
- Temp Captain John Willden Burdett, Leicestershire Regiment
- Quartermaster and Hon. Captain William Burnett, Liverpool Regiment
- Captain William Maurice Brownlie Burnyeat, Monmouthshire Regiment
- Temp Captain Eric Thomas Burr, General List
- Temp Lieutenant Lawrence Buckley Burtt, London Regiment
- Temp Lieutenant Charles Albert Butcher, Royal Engineers
- Temp Lieutenant Thomas Charles Butcher, Royal Field Artillery
- Temp Lieutenant Louis John Caffrey, Rifle Brigade
- Temp Captain Robert Nixon Caldwell, South Wales Borderers
- Captain Charles Frederick Campbell, Royal Horse Artillery
- Captain Hugh Campbell, Royal Garrison Artillery
- Temp Captain William Orr Campbell, Army Service Corps
- Temp 2nd Lieutenant Duncan Carmichael, North Lancashire Regiment
- Lieutenant David Macfarlane Carmichael, Royal Field Artillery
- Temp Lieutenant Richard Carpentir, Royal Artillery
- Temp Lieutenant James Walter Carr DCM Royal Fusiliers
- Temp Captain Tom Stewart Carr, Royal Field Artillery
- Lieutenant Hugh Clay-Carter, South Staffordshire Regiment
- Temp Captain Clement Ignatius Casey, General List
- Temp Lieutenant Simon Magnus Castello, Intell. Corps
- Lieutenant Harvard Wells Cave, Royal Field Artillery
- 2nd Lieutenant Edward Randal Chadwyck-Healey, Royal Artillery
- Lieutenant James Chalmers DCM Royal Scots, attd. Machine Gun Corps
- Company Sergeant Major John Wisley Chalmers, Gordon Highlanders
- Captain Bernard Isbister Chambers, Royal Engineers, Spec
- Captain Francis Gibaut Chambers, Royal Garrison Artillery
- Temp Captain Charles Chamier, Bedfordshire Regiment
- Lieutenant Stephen Henry Deschamps Chamier, West Yorkshire Regiment
- Captain Claude Cyril Chandler, West Yorkshire Regiment
- Captain Frederick Charles Chandler Royal Army Medical Corps
- Temp Captain Christopher Heukensfeldt Chapman, Royal Garrison Artillery
- Lieutenant Henry Robert George Lydd Chapman, London Regiment
- Company Sergeant Major Leonard William Chapman, Northamptonshire Regiment
- Temp Lieutenant Robert McLeod Chapman, General List
- Lieutenant John Compton Cavendish, Lord Chesham, Hussars
- Lieutenant Thomas Bird Cheverton, Royal Field Artillery
- Temp 2nd Lieutenant David John Chisholm, Royal Engineers
- Lieutenant Nevill Christopherson, Royal Field Artillery
- Temp Quartermaster and Hon. Lieutenant Alexander Clark, Seaforth Highlanders
- Temp Lieutenant Richard Michael Clark, Royal Engineers
- 2nd Lieutenant William Bailey Clarke, Royal Field Artillery
- Company Sergeant Major Stanley Richard Clay, Grenadier Guards
- Sergeant Major William Cleall, Duke of Cornwall's Light Infantry
- Rev. Charles Close, Army Chaplains' Department
- 2nd Lieutenant William Thomas Cobb, South Wales Borderers
- Lieutenant Montagu Campbell Wynyard Cobby, Royal Garrison Artillery
- Lieutenant William Cockburn, Yeomanry
- Lieutenant Arthur Richard Montagu Cockerton, Royal Field Artillery
- Company Sergeant Major John Cole, West Yorkshire Regiment
- Temp Lt Edward Charles Batt Collinp RNVR
- Lieutenant Edward Alexander Colliver, Army Service Corps
- Temp Captain Herbert Woodroffe Colliver, Royal Field Artillery
- Temp Lieutenant Edward Howe Collinson, Machine Gun Corps
- 2nd Lieutenant George Collyer, Royal Engineers
- Lieutenant Albert Osmond Colvin, London Regiment
- Temp 2nd Lieutenant Charles Blampied Colston, Royal Engineers
- Temp Captain Frank Conan, Army Service Corps
- Temp Captain Bloomfield George Henry Connolly Royal Army Medical Corps
- Temp Lieutenant Eric Seymour Connor, Royal Field Artillery
- Captain Charles Graham Arthur John Conyers, Royal Field Artillery
- Lieutenant Edward Alexander Cook, West Yorkshire Regiment
- Temp Captain Charles Herbert Cooke, Northumberland Fusiliers
- Lieutenant Cyril Hands Cooke, Royal Berkshire Regiment
- Temp Sergeant Major Thomas Cooper, Royal Artillery
- Temp 2nd Lieutenant Charles Egbert Cope, Oxfordshire & Buckinghamshire Light Infantry
- Sergeant Major Ernest Cope, Nottinghamshire & Derbyshire Regiment
- Lieutenant Douglas Chatterton Bruce Copeland, London Regiment
- Captain Thomas William Corbett, Indian Cavalry
- Lieutenant Frederick Benjamin Cornelius, Royal Engineers
- Company Sergeant Major Peter Coulter DCM Cheshire Regiment
- Captain Henry Cowan, Army Service Corps
- Company Sergeant Major James Coxon, West Riding Regiment
- 2nd Lieutenant Archibald Craig, Gordon Highlanders
- 2nd Lieutenant Stephen Cranston, Scottish Rifles
- Lieutenant Philip Cranswick, Royal Engineers
- Lieutenant Victor Raymond Wallen Crawford, Royal Garrison Artillery
- Captain Andrew Creery, Royal Garrison Artillery
- Lieutenant Edward William Cremer, Rifle Brigade
- Temp Lieutenant Charles Alexander Crighton, Intell. Corps
- Temp Lieutenant Frederick Leo Crilly, Royal Irish Fusiliers
- Sergeant Major Leslie Alfred Cronk, Royal Army Medical Corps
- Temp Captain William Noel Crosby, Yorkshire Regiment
- Company Sergeant Major Gilbert Rhodes Cross MM Liverpool Regiment
- Lieutenant Edward Neufville Crosse, Royal Field Artillery
- 2nd Lieutenant Albert Ernest Crowder, South Wales Borderers
- 2nd Lieutenant Patrick Benignus Cullinan, Leinster Regiment
- Captain Edward Ronald Culverwell, Royal Garrison Artillery
- Lieutenant Fenton King Cummins, Connaught Rangers
- Lieutenant John Cecil Currie, Royal Horse Artillery
- 2nd Lieutenant Richard Curzon-Hope, Essex Regiment
- Temp 2nd Lieutenant David Chalmers Cuthbertson, Army Service Corps
- Temp Captain Alec Hugh Dabell, Royal Field Artillery
- Captain Frederick Dakin, Royal Garrison Artillery
- Lieutenant Alfred Percival Dale, Royal Garrison Artillery
- Company Sergeant Major Robert Dalgleish, Royal Irish Rifles
- Temp Lieutenant Francis Herbert Dallison, Royal Engineers
- Lieutenant Norman Dameral Dalton, Middlesex Regiment, Machine Gun Corps
- Company Sergeant Major Hedley George Dancocks, Middlesex Regiment
- Lieutenant George Darby, Royal Field Artillery
- Temp Lieutenant John Alexander Davidson, Royal Engineers
- 2nd Lieutenant Douglas Joseph Davies, Royal Dublin Fusiliers
- Temp Quartermaster and Hon. Captain George Frederick Davies, Northumberland Fusiliers
- Lieutenant Hubert Benson Davies, Monmouthshire Regiment
- Captain Hugh Warburton Davies, Worcestershire Regiment
- Temp Captain Matthew Henry Davies, Intell. Corps
- Lieutenant Geoffrey Alan Davies-Colley, Manchester Regiment
- Lieutenant Percival William Davis, Royal Engineers
- Captain David Dempster Royal Army Medical Corps
- Captain Roland Dening, Indian Cavalry
- Temp Captain Kenneth Robert Fullarton Denniston, Royal Field Artillery
- Temp Captain Harold Derbyshire, Royal Garrison Artillery
- Captain James Derham-Reid, Royal Army Medical Corps
- 2nd Lieutenant John Hamilton des Voeux, North Staffordshire Regiment, attd. Machine Gun Corps
- Temp Captain John Wescott Dew Royal Army Medical Corps
- Captain Alan Peile Dickinson, Liverpool Regiment
- 2nd Lieutenant James Ian Blomfield Dickson, Royal Garrison Artillery
- Temp Lieutenant Thomas William Dickson, Royal Engineers
- Temp Lieutenant Thomas Francis Dillon, Royal Engineers
- Temp Lieutenant Gaëtan Ogier d'Ivry, Royal Field Artillery
- 2nd Lieutenant George Frederick Dixon, East Yorkshire Regiment
- Temp Lieutenant Herbert Ridley Dixon, Royal Engineers
- Lieutenant Reginald Francis Dixon, Royal Garrison Artillery
- Captain Robert Speir Dixon, Highland Light Infantry
- Lieutenant Scott Ure Dobbie, Argyll & Sutherland Highlanders
- Temp Captain Percy Coultas Dodsworth, Northumberland Fusiliers
- Temp Sergeant Major Alfred George Dollery, East Lancashire Regiment
- Lieutenant John Donaldson, Manchester Regiment
- Captain Edward Mungo Dorman, Dragoon Guards
- Temp Captain John Campbell-Douglas, Royal Irish Rifles
- Lieutenant Norman Douglas-Stephenson, North Lancashire Regiment
- Lieutenant Alfred Dowson, Royal Garrison Artillery
- Captain Frederick Vanderstegen Drake, Hussars
- Temp 2nd Lieutenant Charles Edward Drakes, Royal Engineers
- Temp Lieutenant Wilfrid Dresser, Yorkshire Regiment
- Captain Murray Whitford Dring, Army Service Corps
- Captain Kearsley Mathwin Drummond, Northumberland Fusiliers
- Captain Squire Duff-Taylor, Royal Dublin Fusiliers
- Company Sergeant Major Alexander Duncan, Argyll & Sutherland Highlanders
- Lieutenant John Grant Duncan-Hughes, Royal Field Artillery
- Lieutenant Robert William Dundas, Royal Scots
- Temp Captain John Bruce Dunn, Highland Light Infantry
- Lieutenant Charles Hinton Du Pre, Army Service Corps
- Temp Lieutenant Charles Eade, Machine Gun Corps.
- Company Sergeant Major Bolton Earle, West Riding Regiment
- Captain Charles Seymour Eastwood, London Regiment
- Lieutenant The Hon. Robert Evelyn Eden, Royal Horse Artillery
- Lieutenant Herbert Geoffrey Edleston, Royal Engineers
- Temp Captain George Edwardes-Lawrence, Army Ordnance Depot
- Captain Douglas Clayton Henry Edwards, Somerset Light Infantry
- 2nd Lieutenant Ferdinand Robert Eiloart, Royal Garrison Artillery
- Lieutenant Louis Alfred Ekins, London Regiment
- Captain George Sampson Elliston, Royal Army Medical Corps
- Lieutenant Rudolph Philip Elwes, Coldstream Guards
- Lieutenant Richard Embleton, Army Service Corps
- Captain Gerald Rufus, Viscount Erleigh, Officers Training Corps
- Lieutenant Arthur David Glanffrwyd Evans, Royal Horse Artillery
- Lieutenant Hugh Elwyn Evans, Yorkshire Regiment
- Lieutenant Sidney Thomas Evans, Royal Garrison Artillery
- Captain Gordon Evill, Manchester Regiment
- Temp Captain Keith Douglas Falconer Royal Army Medical Corps
- 2nd Lieutenant George Neil Farquhar, Royal Field Artillery
- Temp Captain Cecil John Fearfield, Royal Engineers
- Lieutenant Oswin Joseph Feetham, Border Regiment
- Captain Edward Anthony Fielden, Hussars
- Temp Lieutenant Sydney Vavasseur Figg, Royal Warwickshire Regiment
- Temp Captain Harry Fine, East Kent Regiment
- Temp Captain Richard Desmond Fitzgerald Royal Army Medical Corps
- Temp 2nd Lieutenant William Gibson Flatters DCM Royal Engineers
- Temp 2nd Lieutenant Leonard Fletcher MM Northumberland Fusiliers
- Lieutenant Francis Reginald Floyd, Devonshire Regiment
- Temp Lieutenant Henry Arthur Foley, Somerset Light Infantry
- Temp Lieutenant Albert Victor Ford, Royal Engineers
- Temp Lieutenant Richard Warren Forrestal, Royal Field Artillery
- Sergeant Major Charles Warcup Foster, East Yorkshire Regiment
- Captain Charles Leslie Foulds, West Yorkshire Regiment
- Captain Thomas Shirley Foweraker, Gloucestershire Regiment
- Lieutenant Arthur Percival Haughton Fowler, Royal Fusiliers
- Lieutenant John Fox, Manchester Regiment
- Temp Captain Ronald Henry Fox, Royal Horse and Royal Field Artillery
- Temp Captain Denys Paul Campbell Franks, Army Service Corps
- Quartermaster and Hon. Captain Charles Frederick Fraser, Royal Army Medical Corps
- Captain Gordon Fraser, Suffolk Regiment
- Lieutenant James Alexander Traill Fraser, London Regiment
- Temp Captain Noel William Freeman, Royal Field Artillery
- Temp Captain Alexander James Rudolph Frantzel, Royal Fusiliers
- Lieutenant David Benny Frew, Royal Engineers
- 2nd Lieutenant Francis Edward Fry, Royal Garrison Artillery
- 2nd Lieutenant Frank Fuller, Herefordshire Regiment
- Temp Captain Thomas Frederick Furnell, King's Royal Rifle Corps
- Temp Lieutenant Frederick Gordon Gadd, Royal Lancaster Regiment
- Temp Lieutenant Herbert Anthony Gale, Wiltshire Regiment
- Captain Robert Arthur Gallie, Yeomanry
- Company Sergeant Major Samuel Foster Gamble, Leicestershire Regiment
- Quartermaster and Hon. Captain Louis John Edward Garcia, York and Lancaster Regiment
- Captain Robert Gardner, Royal Lancaster Regiment
- Temp Lieutenant Charles Edgar Garland, Nottinghamshire & Derbyshire Regiment
- Temp Captain William Edward Garrett Fisher, Highland Light Infantry
- Lieutenant William Roscoe Gaskell, South Lancashire Regiment, attd. Machine Gun Corps
- 2nd Lieutenant Herbert Arthur Gatward, Royal Garrison Artillery
- Captain Oliver Gaunt, Royal Field Artillery
- Lieutenant David Gee, Royal Warwickshire Regiment
- Lieutenant George Augustine Gee, Royal Garrison Artillery
- Lieutenant Frederick Charles George, Royal Field Artillery
- Temp Lieutenant Ronald Julius Wernher Gervers, Intell. Corps
- Captain Thomas Pilling Gibbons, Hertfordshire Regiment
- Temp Lieutenant Evelyn Reginald Gibson, Royal Garrison Artillery
- 2nd Lieutenant George William Gibson, Royal Garrison Artillery
- Lieutenant William James Gilbert, Royal Lancaster Regiment
- Lieutenant Alfred Oscar Gilby, Royal Field Artillery, Royal Army Medical Corps
- Temp Captain Hope Murray Gillespie Royal Army Medical Corps
- Lieutenant Harold Gilliat, West Yorkshire Regiment
- Captain James FitzGerald Gloster, Royal Munster Fusiliers
- Temp Captain Cecil Arnold Godfrey, North Lancashire Regiment
- Lieutenant Cuthbert Eustace Going, Middlesex Regiment
- Temp Captain George Hartley Goldsmith, Royal Engineers
- Sergeant Major Alfred Gooch, Royal Field Artillery
- Temp Captain Harold Gooch, Royal Engineers
- 2nd Lieutenant William Henry Good, Connaught Rangers
- Rev. John Goodacre, Army Chaplains' Department
- Captain Claude Oliver Goodchild, Liverpool Regiment
- Temp Lieutenant Roy Walton Gooddy, Army Service Corps Royal Field Artillery
- Temp Lieutenant Frank John Goode, Machine Gun Corps
- Captain James Gordon Goodfellow, Royal Engineers
- Quartermaster and Hon. Lieutenant Harry Vincent Goodman, Liverpool Regiment
- Quartermaster and Hon. Major Andrew Gordon, Royal Scots
- Lieutenant Cosmo Alexander Gordon, Grenadier Guards
- Captain Charles Alexander Cosmo Gordon, Royal Garrison Artillery
- Lieutenant Roland Elphinstone Gordon, Royal Field Artillery
- Lieutenant Vernon William Goss, Royal Field Artillery, Royal Field Artillery
- Company Sergeant Major John Gough, Yorkshire Light Infantry
- Lieutenant Frederick Gould, London Regiment
- Captain Charles Norman Gover Royal Army Medical Corps
- Rev. Albert Philip Gower-Rees, Army Chaplains' Department
- Captain William James Graham, Gordon Highlanders
- Temp Captain Donald Farquharson Grant, Royal Field Artillery
- Captain Archibald Frank Gray, Royal Garrison Artillery
- Temp Captain John William Grayston, Royal Garrison Artillery
- Captain Bernard Green, Oxfordshire & Buckinghamshire Light Infantry, attd. Machine Gun Battalion
- Lieutenant Edward Ernest Green, Royal Engineers
- Temp Captain George Alan Green, Tank Corps
- Lieutenant George Richard Green, Grenadier Guards
- Company Sergeant Major Sydney Charles Green, Suffolk Regiment
- Captain Edward Allan Greene, Yeomanry
- Lieutenant Eric Kingsley Greenhow, Royal Engineers
- Lieutenant Roger Gresley, Royal Field Artillery
- Temp Lieutenant Charles Boyd Grey, Royal Garrison Artillery
- Lieutenant Geoffrey Grice, Royal Garrison Artillery
- Lieutenant Kenneth Walton Grigson, Devonshire Regiment
- Captain Gerald Baxter Groom, West India Regiment
- Rev. Edward Montmorency Guilford, Army Chaplains' Department
- Captain Frederick Gwatkin, Indian Cavalry
- Temp Captain Leonard Herbert Haines, General List
- 2nd Lieutenant Alfred Halkyard, Leicestershire Regiment
- Sergeant Major William Hall, Royal Garrison Artillery
- Temp 2nd Lieutenant William Donald de Putron Hall, Royal West Kent Regiment
- Rev. John Edmund Hamilton, Army Chaplains' Department
- Temp 2nd Lieutenant Ronald Trant Hamilton, Royal Irish Regiment
- Lieutenant Edmund Bland Hammond, Royal Engineers
- Lieutenant Harold Joseph Hampson, Manchester Regiment
- Temp Captain Ronald Montague Handfield-Jones, Royal Army Medical Corps
- Lieutenant Herman Charles Hannam-Clark, Royal Engineers
- Lieutenant William Charles Hanworth, Royal Field Artillery
- 2nd Lieutenant Harry Gladwyn Harcourt, Royal Dublin Fusiliers, attd. Machine Gun Corps
- Temp Lieutenant Grainger Hope Hargreaves, Royal Engineers
- 2nd Lieutenant Harold Henry Harman, London Regiment
- Lieutenant Charles Harris, Royal Field Artillery
- Lieutenant Maurice William Sidney Harris, Middlesex Regiment
- 2nd Lieutenant William Harrison, Liverpool Regiment, attd. Machine Gun Corps
- Captain Ernest Hart, North Lancashire Regiment
- Temp Lieutenant Harold Eaton Hart, Royal Field Artillery
- Temp 2nd Lieutenant Walter Hart MM Royal Fusiliers
- Lieutenant Douglas Arthur Harvey, Royal Field Artillery
- Captain Nicholas Hopkins Henry Haskins Royal Army Medical Corps
- Captain Sidney Martin Hattersley Royal Army Medical Corps
- Temp Lieutenant James George Hatton, Royal Field Artillery
- Captain David Harvey Haugh, Seaforth Highlanders, attd. Machine Gun Corps.
- Lieutenant Geoffrey Severin Anthony Hawkins, Royal Field Artillery Scots
- Temp Captain John Berry Haycraft Royal Army Medical Corps
- Captain John Grenville Hayter, Royal Field Artillery
- Temp 2nd Lieutenant Cyril Hayward, Yorkshire Light Infantry
- Lieutenant Robert Charles Hayward, South Lancaster Regiment
- Temp Captain William Augustus Hazeldine, General List
- Lieutenant Fredrick James Heasman, Grenadier Guards
- 2nd Lieutenant Robert Sholto Hedderwick, Royal Garrison Artillery
- 2nd Lieutenant Alfred Charles Heggs, Machine Gun Corps
- Temp Captain Henry Harold Hemming, Royal Artillery
- Lieutenant Bertram Mackay Henderson, Gordon Highlanders
- Temp Captain James Elmslie Henderson, Royal Artillery
- Temp Lieutenant William Watson Henderson, King's Own Scottish Borderers
- Lieutenant John Gairdner White Hendrie, Royal Field Artillery
- Lieutenant Vaughan Augustus Herbert, Indian Army Reserve of Officers
- Temp Lieutenant Bernard John Herrod, Northumberland Fusiliers
- 2nd Lieutenant Bertie Barron Hewat, Royal Field Artillery
- Temp Captain William Edgar Hewett, Machine Gun Corps
- Quartermaster and Hon. Captain Henry Hickie, Irish Guards
- Lieutenant Anderson Cunningham Hill, Royal Engineers, secd. Tank Corps
- Lieutenant Fred Hill, Liverpool Regiment
- Temp Captain Hugh Burrow Hill, General List
- Lieutenant Reginald William Welfare Hills, Royal Fusiliers
- Temp Captain Godfrey John Douglas Hindley Royal Army Medical Corps
- Quartermaster and Hon. Captain Charles Hinchcliffe, West Yorkshire Regiment
- Captain Charles Julius Hirst, Yeomanry
- Temp 2nd Lieutenant Leonard George Hirst, Royal Engineers
- Temp Lieutenant Wilfred Hobbs, Bedfordshire Regiment
- Lieutenant Montague William Hocker, Scots Guards, attd. Machine Gun Guards
- Temp Lieutenant Thomas Gerald Hodgkinson, Royal Field Artillery
- Captain Charles Gordon Hogg, Seaforth Highlanders
- Temp Lieutenant Vyvyan George Holgate, Royal Engineers
- Lieutenant Sidney Harry Holley, Manchester Regiment
- Temp Lieutenant Stanley York Holloway, Lines. Regiment
- Lieutenant Adrian Holman, Royal Field Artillery
- Temp 2nd Lieutenant Grimshaw Holt, Royal Welsh Fusiliers
- Lieutenant Edward Noel St. John Leslie Homan, Army Service Corps
- Lieutenant John Mackenzie Bax Homfray, Royal Field Artillery
- Captain Benjamin Honour, Royal Field Artillery
- Temp Lieutenant William John Hood, Royal Fusiliers
- Temp Captain Edward Thomas Hook, Welsh Regiment
- Lieutenant Eric Francis Hope, Royal Garrison Artillery
- Quartermaster and Hon. Captain William Miller Hope, Durham Light Infantry
- Lieutenant Arthur Emlyn Hopkins, East Lancashire Regiment
- Temp Lieutenant William Samuel Hopkins, Tank Corps
- Captain Herle Maudslay Hordern, Royal Garrison Artillery
- Lieutenant Harold Reginald Home, Leicestershire Regiment
- Captain Alfred Lionel Homer, Army Veterinary Corps
- Temp Lieutenant William Horsley, Tank Corps
- Temp Lieutenant Murray Frank Horton, Royal Field Artillery
- Temp Captain Eric Bernard Hough, Liverpool Regiment
- Lieutenant John Reginald Houghton, London Regiment
- Lieutenant William Henry House, Royal Field Artillery
- 2nd Lieutenant Douglas Walter Howard, London Regiment
- Lieutenant Harold George Howson, Royal Field Artillery
- Sergeant Major Frank Huband DCM Royal Fusiliers
- Lieutenant Charles Henry Hudson, Seaforth Highlanders
- Company Sergeant Major William Huggins, Oxfordshire & Buckinghamshire Light Infantry
- Temp Captain Aubrey Everard Hughes, Royal Engineers
- Quartermaster Sergeant Frank Hughes, Royal Fusiliers
- Temp 2nd Lieutenant Bertram Henry Hull, Army Service Corps
- Lieutenant Edwin William Arnold Humphreys, Royal Engineers
- Temp Lieutenant Norman Richard Hunting, Northamptonshire Regiment
- Lieutenant Charles Frederic Hurndall, Royal Field Artillery
- 2nd Lieutenant Alfred Huskisson, Machine Gun Corps
- Temp Lieutenant John Garbutt Hutchinson, Army Service Corps
- Temp 2nd Lieutenant Adam Fraser Hutchison, Royal Horse and Royal Field Artillery
- Lieutenant Joseph Hutton, South Lancashire Regiment
- Temp Captain Austin Harvey Huycke Royal Army Medical Corps
- Temp 2nd Lieutenant Oliver Francis Huyshe, Army Service Corps
- Temp Lieutenant Philip Ingleson, General List
- Temp Lieutenant Bruce Stirling Ingram, Royal Artillery
- Temp Captain Harloe Alfred Taylor O'Callaghan Irwin, Royal Engineers
- Temp 2nd Lieutenant Robert Beatty Wylie Irwin, Royal Inniskilling Fusiliers
- Lieutenant James Albert Iveson, Royal Garrison Artillery
- Temp Lieutenant Daniel J. Jack, Army Ordnance Depot
- Quartermaster and Hon. Captain George Jackson, Durham Light Infantry
- Temp Lieutenant Geoffrey John Jackson, Tank Corps
- Temp Captain Walter Frederick Jackson, Army Service Corps
- 2nd Lieutenant William Gladstone James, Royal Garrison Artillery
- Temp Captain John Lewis Jenkins, Army Service Corps
- Captain Stephen Spencer Jenkyns, Rifle Brigade
- Lieutenant Frank Nevill Jennings, Royal Field Artillery
- Temp Lieutenant Alfred Claude Jessup, Royal Engineers
- Company Sergeant Major Arthur Jess, Rifle Brigade
- Captain David William John, Royal Army Medical Corps
- Temp Lieutenant Alfred William Johnson, Royal Engineers
- Captain Leonard Clarkson Johnson, Manchester Regiment
- Lieutenant Richard Williams Johnson, Liverpool Regiment
- Lieutenant Walter Percy Johnson, Royal Field Artillery
- Captain Charles Evelyn Johnston, London Regiment
- Temp Captain Joseph Greenfield Johnston Royal Army Medical Corps
- Temp Captain Charles George Johnstone, King's Royal Rifle Corps
- Lieutenant Richard Gordon Johnstone, Royal Field Artillery
- Captain Griffiths Lewis Jones, Royal Army Medical Corps
- Lieutenant Harold Sutton Jones, Lancashire Fusiliers
- Temp Lieutenant William Bruce Rainey Joy, Army Service Corps
- Temp Lieutenant Cyril Hensman Joyce, Lincolnshire Regiment
- Temp Lieutenant Ernest James Theodore Jungius, Bedfordshire Regiment, attd. Machine Gun Corps
- Lieutenant Francis Beresford Katinakis, Dragoon Guards
- Captain Geoffrey Lancelot Kaye, Royal Field Artillery
- Captain David Keir, Army Veterinary Corps
- Temp Captain Gordon Lionel Kemp, Royal Sussex Regiment
- Lieutenant John Hutton Fisher Kendall, Royal Engineers
- Temp Captain David Anderson Duncan Kennedy Royal Army Medical Corps
- Quartermaster Sergeant John Wilson Kennedy, Royal Inniskilling Fusiliers (now Machine Gun Corps)
- Captain Percy Macauley Ashworth Kerans, Dragoon Guards
- Temp Captain Henry Birkmyre Kerr, General List
- Lieutenant Harold Reginald Kerr, Army Service Corps
- Captain Gerald Patrick Kidd, Royal Army Medical Corps
- Sergeant Major Alfred Kiddie DCM Machine Gun Corps
- Captain John Kiggell, Royal Engineers
- Lieutenant Remington Kirby, Royal Field Artillery
- Lieutenant Geoffrey Dugdale Kirwan, Royal Garrison Artillery
- Temp Staff Sergeant Major George Knight, Army Service Corps
- Temp Lieutenant Thomas Kenneth Knox, Royal Engineers
- Captain Frank Herbert Lacey, Royal Engineers
- Lieutenant James Wilson Laird, Royal Engineers
- Sergeant Major Herbert Laking DCM West Yorkshire Regiment
- Temp Captain Harry Fenton Lambert, Army Service Corps
- Captain Walter Peter Lambert, Connaught Rangers
- Captain Charles Reginald Cambridge Lane, Indian Cavalry.
- The Rev. John Geoffrey Lane-Davies, Army Chaplains' Department
- Temp Lieutenant Aristide Louis Robert Laroque, Royal Engineers
- Captain Francis Seward Laskey, Manchester Regiment, seconded Tank Corps
- Captain John MacDuff Latham, Highland Light Infantry
- Captain Alexander Erskine Lawrence, King's Royal Rifle Corps
- Lieutenant George Vernon Lawrie, Scottish Rifles
- 2nd Lieutenant Henry Francis Laycock, Royal Garrison Artillery
- Temp Lieutenant John Laycock, Royal Engineers
- Captain Francis Hemery Le Breton, Royal Field Artillery
- Lieutenant John Leckie, South Staffordshire Regiment, attd. Machine Gun Corps
- Sergeant Major Leonard Lee, Oxfordshire & Buckinghamshire Light Infantry
- Captain Sir John Victor Elliott Lees Bt King's Royal Rifle Corps
- Temp 2nd Lieutenant Frederick Pyne Lenard, Tank Corps
- Temp Captain Wilfrid Lenton, Army Veterinary Corps
- Lieutenant Alan Liddell, Durham Light Infantry
- Temp Captain Francis James Lidderdale Royal Army Medical Corps
- Temp Lieutenant Harold Stannard Ling, Machine Gun Corps
- Lieutenant Charles Goodman Linnell, South Lancashire Regiment
- Lieutenant Arthur Reginald Lister, Royal Artillery
- Sergeant Major Joseph Littler DCM Grenadier Guards
- Temp Captain Wilton Llewelyn-Roberts, Army Service Corps
- Lieutenant Frank Gibson Lockwood, Royal Field Artillery
- The Rev. Arthur Longden, Army Chaplains' Department
- Lieutenant Reginald Hollins Lord, Royal Field Artillery
- Sergeant Major Frederick Loveland, Royal Army Medical Corps
- Lieutenant Charles Edward Berkeley Lowe, Royal Garrison Artillery
- Lieutenant Percival Rodd Lowman, South Staffordshire Regiment, attd. Machine Gun Corps
- Rev. Geoffrey Charles Lester Lunt, Army Chaplains' Department
- Lieutenant Alexander Macaulay, Seaforth Highlanders
- Lieutenant Alfred Oliver McCarthy, Royal Garrison Artillery
- Temp Captain Norman McCannochie, Hampshire Regiment
- Temp Captain Gerald McDermott, Army Service Corps
- Captain Donald Christopher Macdonald Royal Army Medical Corps
- Temp Captain William James Macdonald Royal Army Medical Corps
- Lieutenant Ernest Trevor Murray McDougal, Scots Guards
- Captain George McDougall, Manchester Regiment
- Hon. Lieutenant John Benjamin Macdowell, General List
- Temp Captain William McEnuff, Lab. Corps
- Company Sergeant Major Patrick McEvoy, Durham Light Infantry
- Temp Captain John Beattie McFarland, Royal Army Medical Corps
- Temp Captain Andrew Macfarlane, Highland Light Infantry
- Captain David McGee, Jr., Argyll & Sutherland Highlanders
- Lieutenant Eric McGregor, Royal Engineers
- Temp Captain Donald Maclntyre Royal Army Medical Corps
- Temp Lieutenant Alexander Matheson McKay, Royal Engineers
- Captain Charles Ion McKay, Royal Field Artillery
- Temp Captain Frederick Samuel Moult McKellen, Northumberland Fusiliers
- Captain William George McKenzie, Royal Army Medical Corps
- Temp Captain Norman Robert McKeown
- Captain William Broun Mackie, Royal Field Artillery
- Sergeant Major Walter McKinney, Liverpool Regiment
- Lieutenant John McLagan, London Regiment
- Temp Captain Charles Allan Maclean, Argyll & Sutherland Highlanders
- Captain William Farquhar McLean Royal Army Medical Corps
- Quartermaster Sergeant Alexander McLennan, Argyll & Sutherland Highlanders
- Lieutenant Douglas McMaster, Royal Field Artillery
- Temp Lieutenant Charles James MacPherson, General List
- Lieutenant Samuel MacPherson, Cameron Highlanders
- Temp Captain Kenneth Matheson Macrae, Royal Field Artillery
- Lieutenant William Craig Mair, Royal Scots Fusiliers
- Captain John Kenneth Maitland, Middlesex Regiment
- Captain Henry Price Malcolm Royal Army Medical Corps
- Sergeant Major Walter Male, Somerset Light Infantry
- Lieutenant Henry Roger Malet, Royal Garrison Artillery
- Temp Captain Gilbert Gumming Manford, Highland Light Infantry
- Lieutenant Thomas Howells Mann, Royal Engineers
- Temp Lieutenant George Manners, General List
- Temp 2nd Lieutenant William Manson, General List
- Quartermaster and Hon. Captain Joseph Marr, Gordon Highlanders
- Lieutenant Francis Windsor Parker Marriott, Royal Garrison Artillery
- Temp Captain Cyril Wilcock Marsden, Manchester Regiment
- Temp Lieutenant Cecil Wallace Marsden, Royal Munster Fusiliers
- Temp Lieutenant Wilfred Walker Marsden, Royal Engineers
- Temp Captain John Forsyth Marshall, Highland Light Infantry
- Lieutenant John Forster Chambers Marshall, Royal Field Artillery
- Lieutenant Henry Martin, Royal Field Artillery
- Sergeant Major Henry Martin DCM Royal Garrison Artillery
- Captain Wilfrid Martineau, Royal Warwickshire Regiment
- Lieutenant John Isaac Mason, Royal Sussex Regiment
- Lieutenant John Hamon Massey, Royal Field Artillery
- Lieutenant Frank Arnold Vivante Dewar Mathews, Royal Engineers
- Temp Captain Henry Aylmer Vallance Matthews, Army Service Corps
- Captain Ralph Charles Matthews, Royal Lancaster Regiment
- Temp Lieutenant James Henry Mauchlen, Cameron Highlanders
- Temp Captain John Halliwell Mawson, Royal Engineers
- Lieutenant Robert Cyril May, Royal Garrison Artillery
- Lieutenant Alan Phillips Mead, Lancers
- Captain James Ballantyne Meikle, Royal Field Artillery
- Temp Lt Hubert William Henry Mellor, Royal Engineers
- Captain Edward Emerson Melly, York and Lancaster Regiment
- Captain Charles Walter Merison, Suffolk Regiment, attd. Machine Gun Corps
- 2nd Lieutenant John Middlebrook, Rifle Brigade
- Temp Lieutenant James Shepley Middleton, Liverpool Regiment
- Captain Gerald Arthur Millar, Royal Garrison Artillery
- Lieutenant Arthur Axel Miller, Royal Field Artillery
- Lieutenant Reginald Miller, Dorsetshire Regiment
- Captain Thomas Watson Duddingston Miller, Royal Engineers
- Lieutenant George Harold Mills, Welsh Regiment, attd. Machine Gun Corps
- Temp Captain Charles Eric Milner, Army Service Corps
- Captain William Henry Buchanan Mirrlees, Royal Field Artillery
- Temp Captain Malcolm Grey Forbes Moffatt, Cameron Highlanders
- Company Sergeant Major Alexander Moir, Cameron Highlanders
- Captain Robert William Haines Moline, Rifle Brigade, attd. Machine Gun Corps
- Captain Francis Robert Henry Mollan, Royal Army Medical Corps
- Temp Captain Alan Moncrieff, Royal Engineers
- Temp Captain William Moore, Royal Inniskilling Fusiliers
- Lieutenant Cyril Frank Morgan, Royal Field Artillery
- Temp Captain Arthur Claud Morrell, Liverpool Regiment
- Lieutenant Albert Morris, Northumberland Fusiliers
- Temp 2nd Lieutenant Charles Joseph Morris, Royal Engineers
- Lieutenant Tankerville Robert Armine Morris, Gloucestershire Regiment
- Sergeant Major Frederick Charles Morrison, Royal Army Medical Corps
- Lieutenant John Morrison, Seaforth Highlanders
- Lieutenant Hugh James Mortimer, Royal Garrison Artillery
- Lieutenant Isaac Henry Mosley, Honourable Artillery Company
- Captain William Nicholson Mossop, West Yorkshire Regiment
- Lieutenant Frederick Charles Mower, Royal Field Artillery
- Temp Captain Dudley Edward Mozley, Gloucestershire Regiment
- 2nd Lieutenant Gordon Cogill Muirhead MM Gordon Highlanders
- Temp Captain The Hon. Godfrey John Mulholland, Army Service Corps
- Lieutenant Thomas Mulligan, Royal Field Artillery
- Lieutenant Arthur Ratliffe Mulliner, Hussars
- Lieutenant Thomas John Mumford, London Regiment
- Temp Captain Ralph Munday, Nottinghamshire & Derbyshire Regiment
- Quartermaster and Hon. Captain Donald Munro, Seaforth Highlanders
- Temp Captain Ronald Neil Mackenzie Murray, Royal Highlanders
- Temp Captain Thomas Joseph Mary Murray, Army Service Corps
- 2nd Lieutenant Percy Edward Myatt, Lab. Corps
- Temp Lieutenant Frank Ivor Nash, Royal Engineers
- 2nd Lieutenant Albert Joseph Nation, Royal Garrison Artillery
- Lieutenant Alexander Neilson, Royal Engineers
- 2nd Lieutenant Richard Nevins, Royal West Surrey Regiment
- Quartermaster and Hon. Captain Arthur Thomas Newell, Royal Welsh Fusiliers
- Sergeant Major Charles James Newman, Lancashire Fusiliers
- Temp 2nd Lieutenant Alfred Leonard Nicholls, Army Service Corps
- Temp Lieutenant Charles Nicholls, Royal Engineers
- Temp Lieutenant Leonard Nicholls, General List
- Captain Arthur Patrick Nicol, Royal Field Artillery
- Captain Kenneth John Nicolson, Royal Field Artillery
- Lieutenant Henry Alexander Nisbet, Spec. List
- Temp Captain Graeme Nixon, Tank Corps
- Lieutenant Albert George Noble, Royal Field Artillery
- Temp Captain Arthur Henry Noble, Army Service Corps
- Temp Captain Edward Russell Noble, West Yorkshire Regiment
- Lieutenant Frank Noble, London Regiment
- Temp Captain James George Gillbard Noble, Duke of Cornwall's Light Infantry
- Temp Lieutenant Robert Denton Sewell Norman, Royal Engineers
- Temp Captain Hugh Gordon Nourse, Royal Engineers
- Captain Albert John Gladstone Dillon O'Flynn, Army Service Corps
- Captain Guy Kingston Olliver, Royal West Surrey Regiment
- Temp Captain Cusack O'Malley Royal Army Medical Corps
- Lieutenant William Shields O'May, Highland Light Infantry
- Temp Lieutenant John Hugh Orpen, Machine Gun Corps
- Captain Alec Ferguson Osborne, Army Service Corps
- Temp 2nd Lieutenant John Rutherford Osmond, Royal Engineers
- Company Sergeant Major Charles Oxford, Army Service Corps
- Lieutenant. Edward Overton-Jonee, Coldstream Guards
- Captain Ernest Dennison Black Oxley, North Staffordshire Regiment
- Captain William Maingay Ozanne, West Riding Regiment
- Lieutenant Henry Dennis Hall Padwick, Loyal North Lancashire Regiment
- Temp Captain John Otho Paget, Royal Sussex Regiment
- Captain Leo Berkeley Paget, Rifle Brigade
- Temp Sergeant Major William Joseph Parker, Royal Field Artillery
- Captain Edward Mainwaring Parker-Jervis, Royal Field Artillery
- Temp Captain Ebenezer Smith Lewis Parry, Royal Field Artillery
- Lieutenant Walter Partington, Cheshire Regiment, seconded Tank Corps
- Temp Captain Ernest Gilbert Passmore, Northamptonshire Regiment
- Temp Lieutenant George Simpson Pattullo, Northumberland Fusiliers
- Temp Captain Ralph Hayward Pavitt, Royal Field Artillery
- Company Sergeant Major Frederick Joseph Payne, Grenadier Guards
- Quartermaster and Hon. Captain Bernard Sydney Peacock, Royal Engineers
- Lieutenant Charles Albert Pearce, Royal Field Artillery
- 2nd Lieutenant John Edward Pearce, Royal Engineers
- Temp Captain Harold Fellows Pearson, Middlesex Regiment
- Temp Captain Main Riversdale Pease, Durham Light Infantry
- Lieutenant Arthur Horace Penn, Grenadier Guards
- Lieutenant William Ronald Campbell Penney, Royal Engineers
- Lieutenant John Penrose, Royal Field Artillery
- Temp Captain Leonard Stanley Pentecost, Nottinghamshire & Derbyshire Regiment
- Temp Captain Herbert Massingberd Pentreath, Royal Army Medical Corps
- Lieutenant Bernard Huson Perl, Royal Lancaster Regiment
- Lieutenant John Perrin, Royal Garrison Artillery
- Lieutenant Isambard Carlyle Perrott, Lincolnshire Regiment
- Lieutenant Allen Leopold Perry, Royal Field Artillery
- Captain Cecil John Petherick, Hussars attd. Machine Gun Corps
- Company Sergeant Major Albert Edward Pettit, Scots Guards
- Company Sergeant Major Frank Edward Phillips, London Regiment
- Captain Arthur Wilton Phipps, Yeomanry
- Temp Lieutenant Sydney Johnson Pickard, Royal Field Artillery
- 2nd Lieutenant Benjamin Alfred Pidgeon, Royal Field Artillery
- Temp Lieutenant Irvine Pierce, Royal Inniskilling Fusiliers
- Temp Quartermaster and Hon. Captain Thomas Courtney Pierce, Manchester Regiment
- Temp Lieutenant Cyril Herbert Piper, East Yorkshire Regiment
- Lieutenant Frederic Michael Arthur Plant, North Staffordshire Regiment
- Quartermaster and Hon. Captain Ernest Hiram John Plowright, Royal Engineers
- 2nd Lieutenant Rigby Pogmore, Royal Garrison Artillery
- Temp Lieutenant Arthur Wilson Polden, Royal Field Artillery
- Captain Leslie Albert Pollak, London Regiment, Machine Gun Corps
- Quartermaster and Hon. Lieutenant Walter Morgan Porter, Monmouthshire Regiment
- Temp Lieutenant David Powell, Royal Engineers
- 2nd Lieutenant John Beresford Powell, Royal Field Artillery
- Captain Frank Pragnell, Nottinghamshire & Derbyshire Regiment
- Company Sergeant Major Bell Pratt, West Yorkshire Regiment
- Lieutenant Leslie Vincent Prentice, Royal Garrison Artillery
- Temp Lieutenant Frederick Cecil Prickett, General List
- Captain John Hedley Thornton Priestnian DSO Lincolnshire Regiment
- Captain George Loraine Kerr Pringle Royal Army Medical Corps
- 2nd Lieutenant Edward Guy Pullan, Worcestershire Regiment
- Captain Richard Guy Purcell, Royal Garrison Artillery
- Temp Lieutenant Douglas Edward Quick, Royal Warwickshire Regiment
- Captain Eric Lawrence Rabone, Worcestershire Regiment
- Temp Lieutenant Harry Ewbank Raine, Durham Light Infantry
- Temp Lieutenant Cecil Malcolm Rait, Argyll & Sutherland Highlanders
- Temp Lieutenant Cecil Arthur Ralph-Smith, Royal Field Artillery
- Captain David Ralston, Scots Rifles, attd. Machine Gun Corps
- Captain Albert Ramsbottom Royal Army Medical Corps
- Temp Captain Bryce Buchanan Ramsey, Machine Gun Corps
- Temp Lieutenant Thomas Granville Randolph, Royal Engineers
- Temp Lieutenant Harold Quincey Rangecroft, Royal Sussex Regiment
- Lieutenant Arthur Benjamin Ransley, Royal Field Artillery
- Captain John Ransom, Royal Berkshire Regiment
- Lieutenant John Donaldson Rawlins, Royal Engineers
- Captain Maurice Claud Raymond, Indian Cavalry
- Lieutenant Charles Gordon Reed, King's Royal Rifle Corps
- Temp 2nd Lieutenant Horace Alfred Reed, Suffolk Regiment
- 2nd Lieutenant Alan Guy Treharne Rees, Royal Field Artillery
- Captain Norman Septimus Regnart, Hussars
- Lieutenant Alexander Reid, Royal Engineers
- Quartermaster Sergeant George Spence Reid, Gordon Highlanders
- Lieutenant Robert Vernon Reid, Loyal North Lancashire Regiment
- Temp Captain Ralph Stuart Renton Royal Army Medical Corps
- Temp Captain Robert Renwick, Royal Irish Rifles
- Captain Douglas George Rice-Oxley, Royal Army Medical Corps
- Captain Edward Francis Ommaney Richards, Lincolnshire Regiment
- Sergeant Major John Given Richardson, Royal Army Medical Corps
- Temp Captain Francis Paull Robathan, Army Service Corps
- Company Sergeant Major Andrew Robb MM Argyll & Sutherland Highlanders
- Lieutenant Arthur Copleston Gay Roberts, Devonshire Regiment
- Lieutenant Harry Adrian Roberts, Royal Field Artillery
- Lieutenant James Edmund Roberts, Worcestershire Regiment
- Temp Lieutenant Joseph Varley Roberts, Royal Engineers
- Company Sergeant Major Robert Griffith Roberts, Royal Welsh Fusiliers
- Lieutenant David Cameron Robertson, Royal Engineers
- Temp Captain Harold John Robertson, Army Service Corps
- Temp Captain Henry Arthur Robinson, General List
- Temp Regimental Sergeant Major John Robinson, Leicestershire Regiment
- 2nd Lieutenant Lionell Keir Robinson, Royal Garrison Artillery
- Lieutenant Percy Harry Robinson, Royal Garrison Artillery
- 2nd Lieutenant Thomas Robinson, Hussars
- Temp Captain Vivian Barry Rogers, General List
- Temp Lieutenant William Alexander Rogerson, Royal Engineers
- 2nd Lieutenant David Ross, Argyll & Sutherland Highlanders
- Temp Lieutenant George Macleod Ross, Royal Engineers
- Temp Captain Robert Stewart Ross, Royal Army Medical Corps
- Temp Sergeant Major Thomas Stanley Ross, South Lancashire Regiment
- Temp Lieutenant John Alington Royds. Machine Gun Corps
- Temp Lieutenant Wilfred Gates Rushton, General List
- Lieutenant Alexander Smith Russell, Royal Garrison Artillery
- Temp Lieutenant William Russell DCM Royal Marine Artillery
- Temp 2nd Lieutenant Stanley Rutherford, East Surrey Regiment
- Temp Captain William James Rutherford Royal Army Medical Corps
- Temp Staff Sergeant Major James Francis Rutter, Tank Corps
- Lieutenant Henry Dudley Ryder, Royal Field Artillery
- Temp Lieutenant Thomas Alfred Ryder, Royal Marine Artillery
- 2nd Lieutenant Harry Markey Salmon, Welsh Regiment
- Lieutenant John Duncan Salmon, Cheshire Regiment
- Lieutenant Henry Northcote Salter, Leicestershire Regiment
- Temp Captain John Delahaye Sampson, Welsh Regiment
- Captain Walter Horace Samuel, Yeomanry
- Temp Captain Patrick Walter Sandeman, Royal Garrison Artillery
- Temp Lieutenant Erland Russell Sanders, Tank Corps
- Temp Lieutenant John William Sands, Royal Engineers
- Company Sergeant Major Archibald Sandy, Rifle Brigade
- Lieutenant John Mildred Sanger, Royal Field Artillery
- Lieutenant Leslie Boulter Saunders, Royal Field Artillery
- 2nd Lieutenant Hubert Vane Schofield, Royal Horse and Royal Field Artillery
- Lieutenant George Ernest Schuster, Yeomanry
- Sergeant Major Anthony Scorer, Northumberland Fusiliers
- Captain Francis James Scott, Dragoon Guards
- Captain Herbert Stewart Lauriston Scott, Hussars
- Staff Sergeant Major Walter Percy Scott, Army Service Corps
- Quartermaster and Hon. Lieutenant George Sellex, Royal Army Medical Corps
- Captain Clement Perronet Sells, Royal Army Medical Corps
- 2nd Lieutenant Harry Shandley, Royal Garrison Artillery
- Captain John James Mclntosh Shaw Royal Army Medical Corps
- Lieutenant Thomas Shearer, Scottish Rifles
- Temp Captain Simpson Shepherd, Royal Engineers
- Temp Captain Charles John de Bunsen Sheringham, General List
- Temp 2nd Lieutenant John Henry Shields, Royal Engineers
- Captain John Simonds, Royal Field Artillery
- Captain Edward Swan Simpson Royal Army Medical Corps
- Lieutenant Alexander Dickson Sinclair, Scottish Rifles
- Lieutenant Richard Millington Sing, Royal Field Artillery
- Lieutenant John William Bernard Skelton, Royal Garrison Artillery
- Quartermaster and Hon. Lieutenant James Small, Machine Gun Corps, formerly Gloucestershire Regiment
- Temp Captain Arthur Archibald Smee, Suffolk Regiment
- Temp Lieutenant Colin Smee, Middlesex Regiment
- Temp Quartermaster and Hon. Captain Alexander Smith, Royal Scots
- Temp Lieutenant Adam Clayton Smith, General List
- Lieutenant Alfred James Smith, North Lancashire Regiment
- Captain Arnold John Hugh Smith, Coldstream Guards
- Lieutenant Clifford Charles Fox Smith, Royal Irish Regiment
- Company Sergeant Major Charles Henry Smith, London Regiment
- Captain Evan Cadogan Eric Smith, Lancers
- The Rev. Ernest Whateley Smith, Army Chaplains' Department
- Temp Lieutenant Herbert Somerville-Smith, Royal Field Artillery
- Company Sergeant Major Matthew Arnold Smith, Durham Light Infantry
- Captain Richard Smith, York and Lancaster Regiment
- Lieutenant Ralph Allen Oscroft Smith, Devonshire Regiment
- Lieutenant Stanley Smith, Royal Garrison Artillery
- Temp Lieutenant Stanley Arthur Smith, Tank Corps
- Temp Captain St. John Robert Eyre Smith, Army Service Corps
- 2nd Lieutenant Samuel John Smith, Royal Field Artillery
- Lieutenant Wilfred Cabourn Smith, King's Royal Rifle Corps
- Temp Lieutenant William Leslie Smith, Worcestershire Regiment
- Captain Eric George Snaith, Leicestershire Regiment
- Captain Rupert Ernest Fowler Sneath, London Regiment
- Lieutenant Robert Bernard Solomon, Royal Field Artillery
- Temp Lieutenant Edmund William Spalding, Royal Garrison Artillery
- Lieutenant Arthur Gerald Bayfield Spear, Royal Field Artillery
- Captain Elmer John Leyland Speed, L. Guards
- Lieutenant Thomas Reginald Carwardine Spence, Royal Scots
- Captain Robert Spencer, Yeomanry
- Temp Captain Arthur Spray, Tank Corps
- Lieutenant Eustace Lawry Squance, Royal Field Artillery
- Company Sergeant Major George Henry Stacey, East Surrey Regiment
- Temp Captain Herbert Claude Stanford, Intell. Corps, General List
- Temp Lieutenant Mark Stanford, General List
- Temp Quartermaster and Hon. Captain Robert Starling, Suffolk Regiment
- Temp Sub-Lieutenant Frederick Witton Stear RNVR
- 2nd Lieutenant Harold Ernest Stearns, Royal Garrison Artillery, Spec. Ree
- Temp 2nd Lieutenant George Steel, Machine Gun Corps
- Lieutenant William Harold Stephenson, Durham Light Infantry
- Captain George Henderson Stevenson Royal Army Medical Corps
- Lieutenant Alan Josiah Steward, Royal Garrison Artillery
- Temp Lieutenant John Livingstone Stewart, Argyll & Sutherland Highlanders
- Sergeant Major James. Stuart Robson Stewart, Rifle Brigade
- Lieutenant William Roland Stewart, Royal Engineers
- Lieutenant Clarence Stott, West Riding Regiment
- Temp Captain Ernest Frederick Strachan, General List
- Temp Captain Francis James Stratten, Middlesex Regiment
- Lieutenant Kenneth Forbes Glascott Stronach, Royal Field Artillery
- 2nd Lieutenant Haydn- Stubbing, London Regiment
- Company Sergeant Major Henry Stubbins, East Yorkshire Regiment
- The Rev. Frank Leslie Sugget, Army Chaplains' Department
- Company Sergeant Major Daniel Sullivan, North Staffordshire Regiment
- Quartermaster and Temp Hon. Lieutenant Albert Charles Summerfield, King's Royal Rifle Corps
- Temp Captain Andrew Theodore Sumner, Royal Engineers
- Temp Captain David Macbeth Sutherland, Royal Scots
- Quartermaster and Temp Hon.Lieutenant Basil Fitzroy Swain, Royal Sussex Regiment
- Temp Lieutenant John Kirby Swales, Royal Engineers
- Temp Captain Cecil Victor Swan, Army Service Corps
- Lieutenant Robert Allan Swinton, Royal Field Artillery
- Temp Captain Arthur George Symons, Middlesex Regiment
- Temp Lieutenant Alexander Tait, Royal Engineers
- Temp S.Sergeant Major Robert Henry Tamlyn, Army Service Corps
- Lieutenant Leonard Beaumont Tansley, Royal Field Artillery
- Captain Michael John Tapper, London Regiment, attd. Tank Corps
- 2nd Lieutenant George Edmund Tatham, Royal Field Artillery
- Lieutenant Eric Eyre Sullivan Taylor, Nottinghamshire & Derbyshire Regiment
- Lieutenant James Taylor, South Lancashire Regiment
- Temp Regimental Sergeant Major Edward Samuel Terry, Royal Field Artillery
- Temp Lieutenant Sidney Frederick Terry, Wiltshire Regiment
- Battery Sergeant Major Albert Orlando Tew, Royal Field Artillery
- Captain Francis Geoffrey Thatcher Royal Army Medical Corps
- Temp Captain Launcelot Theodore Charlton Thatcher, Army Service Corps
- Temp 2nd Lieutenant Herbert James Thorn, Royal Scots
- Temp Lieutenant Edward Thomas, Machine Gun Corps
- Temp 2nd Lieutenant Robert Stanley Thomas, Worcestershire Regiment
- Temp Captain Benjamin Cyril Thompson, Royal Garrison Artillery
- Temp Lieutenant Christopher Thompson, Royal Field Artillery
- Temp 2nd Lieutenant John Thomson, Northumberland Fusiliers
- Temp Lieutenant Archibald Thorburn, Royal Engineers
- Temp Captain Francis Bodenham Thornely, Royal Irish Rifles
- Temp Captain John Hardwick Thornley Royal Army Medical Corps
- Temp Captain Roland Hobhouse Thornton, General List
- Temp Lieutenant James Allan Thurstan, Tank Corps
- Captain Jeffery Marsland Thwaites, Royal Field Artillery
- Temp 2nd Lieutenant Reginald Tivey, North Staffordshire Regiment
- Lieutenant Claude Tirand, Royal Berkshire Regiment, Intell. Corps
- Temp Captain James Arnaud Tobin Royal Army Medical Corps
- Lieutenant Alan Leslie Tosland, Royal Warwickshire Regiment
- Temp 2nd Lieutenant Charles Eric Townsend, Royal Field Artillery
- 2nd Lieutenant Stanley Prosser Tredinnick, London Regiment
- Lieutenant John Trehane, Duke of Cornwall's Light Infantry
- Captain Stewart Jack le Poer Trench, Yeomanry
- Temp Lieutenant Paul Triefus, Royal Field Artillery
- Company Sergeant Major James Trimmer, Seaforth Highlanders
- Lieutenant Edward Trudgill DCM Royal Horse and Royal Field Artillery
- Captain William Guise Tucker, Royal Engineers
- Lieutenant Archibald Turnbull, Royal Scots Fusiliers
- Temp Lieutenant Maxwell Turnbull, Border Regiment
- Captain George Charlewood Turner, London Regiment
- Captain William Arthur Scales Turner, Royal Field Artillery
- Captain Herbert Broke Turnor, Lancers
- Temp Lieutenant Alfred Ernest Turpin, Royal Artillery
- Temp Lieutenant Arthur Tyler, Army Service Corps
- Captain John Crammond Urquhart, Lincolnshire Regiment
- Temp Captain Vernon Watkins Urquhart, Army Ordnance Depot
- Temp Lieutenant Douglas Uzielli, General List
- Sergeant Major Henry John Vatcher, South Wales Borderers
- Lieutenant Arthur Douglas Vaughan, Seaforth Highlanders, attd. Machine Gun Corps
- Lieutenant Leslie Reginald Vaughan, Royal Engineers
- Lieutenant Leslie James Coleman Vidler, Royal West Surrey Regiment
- Temp Lieutenant Geoffrey Vipan, Royal Engineers
- Temp Captain Henry Theodore Wade-Gery, Lancashire Fusiliers
- Lieutenant Walter William Wadsworth, Royal Field Artillery
- Lieutenant Dennis Edward Francis Waight, Northumberland Fusiliers
- Lieutenant Owen Wakeford, Royal Garrison Artillery
- Sergeant Major Thomas Henry Waldren, Royal Inniskilling Fusiliers
- Temp Sub Lieutenant Cyril Gordon Walker RNVR
- Lieutenant Maurice Cecil Walker, Royal Garrison Artillery
- Lieutenant Philip Howard Walker, Royal Field Artillery
- 2nd Lieutenant Stanley Walker, Royal Horse and Royal Field Artillery
- 2nd Lieutenant William Henry Walker, Royal Garrison Artillery
- Captain William McNeill Walker, Royal Army Medical Corps
- Captain Thomas Leetham Wall, Lancers
- Captain David Euan Wallace, Life Guards
- Lieutenant Bertram James Wallington, Royal Field Artillery
- Lieutenant Eric Arthur Underwood Ward, Royal Engineers
- Company Sergeant Major Frederick Arthur Ward, South Staffordshire Regiment
- Captain Robert Ogier Ward, Royal Field Artillery
- Quartermaster Sergeant Cecil Waring, Royal Welsh Fusiliers
- Temp Captain Christopher Prioleau Warren, Rifle Brigade
- Temp Captain Arthur Powell Watkins, Worcestershire Regiment
- Sergeant Major Abraham Watson MM King's Royal Rifle Corps
- Lieutenant James Harvey Long Watson, Leinster Regiment
- Temp Lieutenant John Watson, General List
- Temp Captain John Watson Royal Army Medical Corps
- Temp Captain William Esplen Watson, Royal Field Artillery
- Temp Lieutenant James Edward Watt, Army Corps of Clerks
- Lieutenant Murray Hamilton Webb-Peploe, Royal Garrison Artillery
- Temp Captain Alexander Urquhart Webster Royal Army Medical Corps
- Lieutenant Frederick Webster, Royal Engineers
- Temp Lieutenant Cyril Warner Weekes, Royal Field Artillery
- Lieutenant Thomas Henderson Weir, Royal Engineers
- 2nd Lieutenant Sidney Howard Welch, Royal Field Artillery
- Company Sergeant Major Charles Wells DCM Dorsetshire Regiment
- Captain Stanley Stephen Wenman, Royal Garrison Artillery
- Temp Captain Edward Maurice West, Army Service Corps
- Lieutenant Lionel Ernest Howard Whitby, Royal West Kent Regiment, Machine Gun Corps
- Temp Captain Archie Cecil Thomas White VC General List
- Temp Captain Francis Herbert White, Yorkshire Light Infantry
- Lieutenant Harry Plant White, Cheshire Regiment
- 2nd Lieutenant Lawrence Arthur White, Royal Field Artillery
- 2nd Lieutenant Taliesyn Gwyn White, Welsh Regiment
- Temp Lieutenant Walter Frederick Sidney White, Army Service Corps
- Lieutenant Francis Mussenden Whitmore-Smith, Dragoon Guards
- Temp Captain Frederick William Whitaker, West Yorkshire Regiment
- Lieutenant Claude Horatio Wilkins, Sussex Regiment
- Temp 2nd Lieutenant Charles Wilkinson, Royal Engineers
- Captain Benjamin Bruce Willcox, London Regiment
- Captain Kingsley Willett, Royal Field Artillery
- 2nd Lieutenant Allan John Williams, Royal Garrison Artillery
- Temp Captain Hubert Francis Llewellyn Williams, Machine Gun Corps
- Lieutenant Ronald Douglas Williams, Royal Irish Rifles
- Temp Captain Richard Earl Williams, Tank Corps
- Lieutenant Thomas James Williams, Royal Field Artillery
- Captain Edgar Arthur Wilson, North Staffordshire Regiment
- Quartermaster Sergeant John Cruickshanks Wilson, Seaforth Highlanders
- Lieutenant John Wilson, Machine Gun Corps
- 2nd Lieutenant John Hathaway Wilson, London Regiment
- Lieutenant Ronald Gordon Maclean Wilson, Royal Engineers
- Temp Captain William Storey Wilson, Royal Highlanders
- Quartermaster Sergeant Frederick Wiltshire, South Wales Borderers
- Captain Douglas Neil Wimberley, Cameron Highlanders, Machine Gun Corps
- Captain Geoffrey Edward Wingfield-Stratford, Royal West Kent Regiment
- Lieutenant Leonard Mostyn Winn, Essex Regiment
- 2nd Lieutenant Edward Micklem Winterbotham, Royal Garrison Artillery
- Captain John Evered Witt, Army Service Corps
- Captain Ronald Guy Pearson Wood, Dragoon Guards
- Temp Quartermaster and Hon. Lieutenant William Wool, Hampshire Regiment
- Staff Sergeant Major Arthur Woplard, Army Service Corps
- 2nd Lieutenant Herbert Smith Woolley, Royal Garrison Artillery
- Temp Lieutenant Leonard Brooke Woolley, Royal Engineers
- Lieutenant George Edward Wright, Royal Fusiliers
- Lieutenant Harry Wright, Gordon Highlanders
- Temp Lieutenant John Armer Wright, Royal Sussex Regiment
- Captain Kenneth Valentine Wright, Royal Field Artillery
- Captain Charles Edward Wurtzburg, Liverpool Regiment
- Captain James Digby Wyatt, Northamptonshire Regiment
- Quartermaster and Hon. Captain Harry Yates, Royal Welsh Fusiliers
- Lieutenant Harold Yeatman, South Staffordshire Regiment
- Temp 2nd Lieutenant John Yellowlees, Durham Light Infantry
- Captain Frederick Augustus Yorke, Royal Garrison Artillery
- Lieutenant Sydney Yorston, Cheshire Regiment
- Temp Lieutenant Edward John Young, Royal West Surrey Regiment
- Lieutenant Sidney Bell Young, Royal Garrison Artillery
- Captain Leigh Norman Younghusband, Royal Artillery

Canadian Force

- Captain William Hamilton Abbott, Field Artillery
- Captain Clifford Maxwell Ackland, Saskatchewan Regiment
- Lieutenant William Boydon Adams, West Ontario Regiment
- Sergeant Major George William Allen, Field Artillery
- Lieutenant Thomas Howard Atkinson, Field Artillery
- Lieutenant Douglas Hume Balmain, West Ontario Regiment
- Hon. Captain and Quartermaster Alfred Albert Edward Batchelor, Saskatchewan Regiment
- Sergeant Major Samuel John Bennett, Central Ontario Regiment
- Captain George Gooderham Blackstock, Field Artillery
- Captain George Frederick Daniels Bond, Saskatchewan Regiment
- Lieutenant John Gundry Church, Central Ontario Regiment
- Lieutenant Arthur Clarke, Mounted Rifles Battalion, Central Ontario Regiment
- Rev. Harry Bertram Clarke, Canadian Chaplains' Service
- Lieutenant Edward Grey Clarkson, Central Ontario Regiment
- Lieutenant Norman Victor Cliff, Central Ontario Regiment
- Lieutenant Michael Cook MM Manitoba Regiment
- Lieutenant Gerald Hanson Davidson, Field Artillery
- Captain Eric Radford Maxwell Davis, Central Ontario Regiment
- Sergeant Major Joseph Depper MM Saskatchewan Regiment
- Quartermaster and Hon. Captain George Tomlinson Dodge, Quebec Regiment
- Sergeant Major Thomas Double, Field Artillery
- Temp Captain Leonard Vivien Drummond-Hay, East Ontario Regiment
- Captain William Theodore Ewing, Army Medical Corps
- Captain Harold Arthur Fowler, Machine Gun Corps
- Lieutenant Lionel George Francis, Machine Gun Corps
- Lieutenant Ernest Edward Guille, British Columbia Regiment
- Captain Arthur Hartley, Engineers
- Sergeant Major Howe Hewlett, Mounted Rifles Battalion
- Captain Rufus Clements Holden, Army Service Corps
- Lieutenant Harry Shaw Holloway, Engineers
- Lieutenant Powell Nicholas-Horton, Central Ontario Regiment
- Lieutenant Wilfred Henry Jolliffe, Central Ontario Regiment
- Lieutenant Harold Samuel Kennedy, Engineers
- Captain Michael Patrick Kennedy, Army Veterinary Corps
- Captain Shirley Thompson, Layton, Garrison Artillery
- Captain Edward Oswald Leadlay, Army Service Corps
- Lieutenant Harold John Mackenzie, Engineers
- Lieutenant Douglas James Maxwell, Garrison Artillery
- Lieutenant Joseph McAmmond, West Ontario Regiment
- Captain James McDermid, Manitoba Regiment
- Captain Alexander McNeil McFaul, Machine Gun Corps
- Captain Frederick Arthur McGiverin, Engineers
- Lieutenant Henry Campbell McMordie, Engineers
- Lieutenant James Learmonth Melville, Engineers
- Lieutenant Fred James Mills, Field Artillery
- Captain John Broughton Mitchell, Alberta Regiment
- Temp Lieutenant Bernard Eric Moberly, Railway Construction Corps
- Captain Henry William Morgan, Quebec Regiment
- Lieutenant Charles Ayre Morris, Engineers
- Lieutenant Abram Rupert Neelands, Engineers
- Captain Stanley Holland Okell, British Columbia Regiment
- Lieutenant Eric Osborne, Machine Gun Corps
- Lieutenant Ronald Roy Parker, Central Ontario Regiment
- Lieutenant Samuel Rutherford Parker, Engineers
- Captain David Paton, East Ontario Regiment
- Captain William Melanethelon Pearce, Machine Gun Corps
- Lieutenant Arthur Pritchard, British Columbia Regiment
- Captain Walter Lionel Rawlinson, Field Artillery
- Lieutenant Charles Edward Read, 1st Central Ontario Regiment
- Captain James Wilbert Reith, Manitoba Regiment
- Lieutenant Allen Gilmour Richmond, Cycling Battalion
- Lieutenant Ernest Otto Rietchel, Manitoba Regiment
- Lieutenant Robert Swan Robertson, Manitoba Regiment
- Captain Robert Porteous Saunders, Central Ontario Regiment
- Captain Lawrence William Webster Slack, Quebec
- Lieutenant Thomas Hammond Stegman, Central Ontario Regiment
- Captain John Franklin Sterns, Garrison Artillery
- Lieutenant Daniel Lionel Teed, Field Artillery
- Captain Charles Gardner Burton Thompson, Royal Canadian Regiment, Nova Scotia Regiment
- Captain Norman Albert Thompson, Field Artillery
- Temp Captain Charles Beresford Topp, Quebec Regiment
- Lieutenant Alfred James Wall, East Ontario Regiment
- Lieutenant Clarence Gladstone Weeks, Central Ontario Regiment
- Lieutenant William Thomas Wilson, Engineers
- Captain Samuel Fraser Workman, Engineers
- Lieutenant John Albert Young, Engineers

Australian Imperial Force

- Lieutenant John Adams, Infantry
- Captain Roy Douglas Bartram, Army Medical Corps
- Captain Leonard Lassetter Beauchamp, Infantry
- Captain John Gillies Bolton, Infantry
- Captain James Brack, Infantry
- Lieutenant Joseph Edward Brown, Infantry
- Lieutenant Percival Henry Brown, Infantry
- Lieutenant James Bull, Infantry
- Lieutenant Leslie Frank Burgess, Engineers
- Lieutenant Stanley Clarence Butler, Infantry
- Lieutenant Beresford Henry Cairnes, Artillery
- Captain George Carroll, Infantry
- Lieutenant Sydney Hubert Carroll, Machine Gun Corps
- Lieutenant Edward Wallis Carter, Army Service Corps
- Lieutenant George Box Carter, Infantry
- Captain Ernest John Chenery, Field Artillery
- Captain Frank Lothian Cheshire, Infantry
- Lieutenant Alec Leslie Rutherford Chomley, Field Artillery
- Lieutenant Mortimer Carr Clark, Field Artillery
- Captain Arthur Francis Cohen, Engineers
- Captain Henry Alfred Cook, Army Service Corps
- Lieutenant Thomas Robinson Collier, Engineers
- Lieutenant Thomas Leo Corcoran, Infantry
- Captain Leslie Charles Andrew Craig, Infantry
- Captain Harry Cross, Infantry
- Captain Alexander Jackson Cunningham, Engineers
- Lieutenant Edward Maurice Cullimore, Machine Gun Corps
- Captain Ernest Davies, Infantry
- Rev. Walter Ernest Dexter DSO DCM Australian Chaplain
- Lieutenant Percy Walter Dobson, Artillery
- Lieutenant Roy Doutreband, Infantry
- Captain Arthur Herbert Dow, Engineers
- Captain William John Earle, Infantry
- Lieutenant Alexander Telfer Ewart MM Engineers
- Lieutenant Roy John Fidler, Engineers
- Lieutenant George Lush Finlay, Infantry
- Lieutenant Arthur Wilfred Finlayson, Infantry
- Quartermaster and Hon. Lieutenant Richard John Forrest, Infantry
- Captain Charles William Scott French, Infantry
- Captain Herbert Roy Gollan, Infantry
- Lieutenant Kenny Arnot Goodland, Infantry
- Captain William James Gordon, Infantry
- Quartermaster and Hon. Captain Carl Beeston Gow, Infantry
- Lieutenant John Gray, Infantry
- Captain Albert Edward Halstead, Infantry
- Lieutenant Oliver John Edward Harris, Infantry
- Captain Stanley William Hawkins, Infantry
- Captain James Arthur Hillman, Engineers
- Captain Ronald Butler Hinder, Engineers
- Captain John Miller Hogg, Machine Gun Corps
- Captain James Peter Wallace Hogg, Infantry
- Quartermaster and Hon. Captain Herbert Sydney Hudd, Infantry
- Captain Samuel Henry Jackson, Infantry
- Captain Wilfred Oldfield Jackson, Field Artillery
- Lieutenant Frederick John Jenkins MM Infantry
- Captain Ivan Bede Jose, Army Medical Corps
- Captain Roy Lamble, Infantry
- Lieutenant Leslie Layton-Smith, Infantry
- Lieutenant Reginald Phelps Little MM Infantry
- Lieutenant James Norman Baker Loudon, Infantry
- Quartermaster and Hon. Captain Sidney Lewis Mclntyre, Infantry
- Captain Harold Eric Maclennon, Infantry
- Lieutenant Norman Gordon McNicol, Infantry
- Captain Norman Reginald Mathews, Army Medical Corps
- Captain Edwin Leslie Medlyn, Army Service Corps
- Captain Thomas Millar, Infantry
- Lieutenant Thomas Ramsay Miller, Infantry
- Quartermaster and Hon. Lieutenant Leonard Molloy, Infantry
- Captain Alban George Moyes, Infantry
- Lieutenant Norman James Nangle, Engineers
- Captain Alfred Douglas Nevien, Infantry
- Lieutenant James Francis O'Rouke, Field Artillery
- Lieutenant Sydney Lewis Patterson, Infantry
- Quartermaster and Hon. Captain Reginald Powell, Infantry
- Captain Cyril Richard Rigg, Artillery
- Lieutenant Leonard Charles Robson, Infantry
- Rev. Francis William Rolland Army Chaplains' Department
- Quartermaster and Hon. Lieutenant Leslie William Rosen, Infantry
- Captain Henry Gordon Rourke, Field Artillery
- Captain Cedric Murray Samson, Army Medical Corps
- Captain Cyril Robert Seelenmeyer, Army Veterinary Corps
- Captain Leonard Greville Sewell, Machine Gun Corps
- Captain Henry Richard Shalders, Field Artillery
- Captain John Alexander Shanasy, Army Medical Corps
- Captain Walter Edmond Smith, Infantry
- Quartermaster and Hon. Captain Henry Edward Spotswood, Infantry
- Captain Colin Gore Stewart, Field Artillery
- Lieutenant Leonard Robert Stillman, Infantry
- Captain Norman William Sundercombe, Infantry
- Captain Reymond Synnot, Field Artillery
- Captain Richard Tambling, Infantry
- Captain Harry Thomson, Infantry
- Lieutenant Oswald William Turner, Infantry
- Captain George Stanley Vanstan, Infantry
- Captain Eric Sydney Walpole Sealy Vidal, Infantry
- Captain William James Waddell, Army Service Corps
- Lieutenant Arthur Waring, Engineers
- Lieutenant James Lauder Watt, Infantry
- Lieutenant George Hubert Wilkins, General List
- Captain William Thomas Wilkinson, Infantry
- Lieutenant Robert Trevor Williams, Infantry
- Lieutenant Herbert Ward Wilson, Infantry
- Captain Charles Burton Withy, Infantry

New Zealand Force

- Captain Philip Blaxland Benham, New Zealand Military Corps
- Lieutenant Charles Cairn Best, Rifle Brigade
- Captain Lachlan Bain Campbell, Engineers
- Captain Robert Bruce Caws, Machine Gun Corps
- Captain Albert Arthur Chapman, Pioneer Battalion
- Lieutenant Philip Brunskill Cooke, Engineers
- Lieutenant Silston Cory-Wright, Engineers
- Lieutenant Hugh Edward Crosse, Wellington Regiment
- Captain William Forrest Fowlds, Rifle Brigade
- Captain Harold Sherbrooke Gabites, Canterbury Regiment
- Captain Loftus Joseph Gibbs, Canterbury Regiment
- Captain Chilton Hayter, Machine Gun Corps
- 2nd Lieutenant Allen Henry King, Otago Regiment
- Lieutenant Archibald Campbell Macdonald, Field Artillery
- Lieutenant John Murdoch Campbell McLeod, Canterbury Regiment
- Lieutenant Horace William Newman, Engineers
- Lieutenant William John Organ, Rifle Brigade
- Lieutenant Charles Oxenham, Auckland Regiment
- Lieutenant Frederick Coates Pascoe, Otago Regiment
- Captain John Norman Rauch, Wellington Regiment
- Lieutenant Laurence John Rowe, Rifle Brigade
- Captain Peter William Gordon Spiers, Otago Regiment
- Lieutenant Frederick Stewart, Auckland Regiment
- Captain Alexander Thomson, Rifle Brigade
- Lieutenant Robert Tilsley, Auckland Regiment
- Captain John Franklin Tonkin, Canterbury Regiment
- Lieutenant John George Concanon Wales, Canterbury Regiment
- Lieutenant Edward Russ Winkler, Field Artillery

South African Force

- Quartermaster and Hon. Lieutenant William Henry Carding, South African Infantry
- Temp Lieutenant Frederick Lyster Dobson, Royal Engineers
- Temp Lieutenant James Jack, Royal Engineers
- Temp Lieutenant Walter Stanley Lunn, Royal Garrison Artillery
- Lieutenant Arthur William Frederick Roper, Royal Garrison Artillery
- Company Sergeant Major Joseph Wood, Infantry

Newfoundland Force

- Temp Lieutenant James Miffin, Royal Newfoundland Regiment

For distinguished service in connection with Military Operations in Salonika—

- Temp. 2nd Lieutenant Roger Addison, East Lancashire Regiment
- Captain William Dinsdale Anderton Royal Army Medical Corps
- Lieutenant George Waring Ashby, Duke of Cornwall's Light Infantry
- Temp. Lieutenant William Reginald Batty, Manchester Regiment
- Temp. Captain Richard Edward Bruce Beal, Army Service Corps
- Lieutenant Desmond William Beamish, Royal Army Medical Corps
- Temp. Captain Robert George Beer, Royal Engineers
- Lieutenant Robert Godfrey Wolseley Bewicke-Copley, King's Royal Rifle Corps and Machine Gun Corps
- Temp. Lieutenant Christopher St. John Bird, Royal Engineers
- Temp. Lieutenant Geoffrey Dumaresq Boissier, Oxfordshire and Buckinghamshire Light Infantry
- The Rev. Joseph Morris Bold, Army Chaplains' Department
- Temp. Lieutenant Quintin Bone, Royal Lancaster Regiment
- Temp. Lieutenant Cecil James Bremner, East Kent Regiment
- Temp. Lieutenant William Henry Brown, Royal Engineers
- Temp. Captain Ernest James Burndred, Army Veterinary Corps
- Lieutenant John Owen Carpenter, East Surrey Regiment
- Temp. Lieutenant William Gilbert Carter, Royal Engineers
- Lieutenant Francis Charles Frederick Cleeve, Royal Field Artillery
- Temp. Lieutenant Frederic Alfred Clemo, Duke of Cornwall's Light Infantry
- 2nd Lieutenant Benjamin Cliff, Scottish Rifles
- Captain Sidney Collingwood, Royal Garrison Artillery
- Temp. Captain Harold Cooper, Royal Field Artillery
- Captain Cecil Cotton, Army Service Corps
- Temp. Lieutenant James Lawson Cowie, Wiltshire Regiment
- Captain Dudley Alfred Cox, East Yorkshire Regiment
- Captain Eugene Henry Coyne Royal Army Medical Corps
- Captain George Lillie Craik, Yeomanry
- Temp. Captain Charles Neville Crawshaw, Royal Scots Fusiliers
- Captain Roger Crofton, Royal Garrison Artillery
- Temp. Lieutenant Sherley Dale, Royal Berkshire Regiment
- 2nd Lieutenant Laurence Darvall, Yorkshire Regiment
- Lieutenant Tudor Huab Davies, Royal Engineers
- Temp. Captain Henry Harvard Davis, Royal Army Medical Corps
- Temp. 2nd Lieutenant Robert Conn Dick, Royal Engineers
- Lieutenant William Alfred Dixon, Suffolk Regiment
- Captain Laurence Rivers Dunne, King's Royal Rifle Corps and Machine Gun Corps
- Lieutenant James Edelston, Royal Garrison Artillery
- Temp. Captain Leslie Wilson Evans Royal Army Medical Corps
- Captain John Arthur Fearnside, Army Veterinary Corps
- Lieutenant Gilbert Edward Fenwick, Northumberland Fusiliers
- Temp. Lieutenant Harold James Fisher, Worcestershire Regiment
- Temp. Lieutenant Walter Foskett, Manchester Regiment
- Lieutenant John Sharman Franey, Royal Field Artillery
- 2nd Lieutenant Fred Franks, Lancashire Fusiliers
- Temp. Lieutenant Frank Garland, Duke of Cornwall's Light Infantry
- Lieutenant Peter Gaskell, Argyll and Sutherland Highlanders
- 2nd Lieutenant Edward Gordon Gedge, Royal Field Artillery
- Temp. Captain John Harrison Dashwood Goldie, Wiltshire Regiment
- Temp. Captain Christopher Sellhouse Gorton, Cheshire Regiment
- Temp. Lieutenant Arthur Trevor Gough, Royal Field Artillery
- Captain Charles Christopher Grattan-Bellew, King's Royal Rifle Corps
- Temp. Captain Geoffrey Clarence Hagger, Royal Field Artillery
- Temp. Captain Thomas Winlack Harley, Royal Lancaster Regiment
- Temp. Lieutenant Herbert Elwin Harris, Shropshire Light Infantry
- Temp. Captain Claude Charles Harrison Royal Army Medical Corps
- Captain Kenneth Eugene Hart, Royal West Surrey Regiment
- Lieutenant Harry Gordon Hartje, Cheshire Regiment
- Captain Ralph Anstruther Crompton Henderson, Cameron Highlanders
- Lieutenant David Halliday Hepburn, Royal Garrison Artillery
- Temp. Lieutenant Thomas Howard Hetherington, Hampshire Regiment
- Captain Hugh Middleton Heyder, Northumberland Fusiliers
- Temp. Lieutenant Frederick Julian Homer, Royal Warwickshire Regiment
- Temp. Captain Philip Robert Hughes, Royal Field Artillery
- Temp. Lieutenant Donald Esme Isaac-lnnes, Royal Engineers
- Lieutenant Owen Richard Jenkyn, Gloucestershire Regiment
- Temp. Lieutenant Basil Jennings-Bramly, Royal Field Artillery
- Lieutenant George Ephraim Johnson, Royal Field Artillery
- Lieutenant Alexander Joyce, Middlesex Regiment
- Captain Angus John Aitchison Kennedy, Yeomanry
- Captain Walter Holman Kennett, Rifle Brigade
- Temp. Lieutenant Eric Sidney Kirk, Border Regiment
- Lieutenant Richard Arthur Lees Knowles, King's Royal Rifle Corps
- Lieutenant Francis Farwell Labouchère-Sparling, Royal Garrison Artillery
- Temp. Lieutenant Frank Milner Leighton, Welsh Regiment
- Captain William Ashley Lethem Royal Army Medical Corps
- Temp. Lieutenant Victor Greville Lewis, Hampshire Regiment (Capt., South African Defence Force)
- Temp. Lieutenant Harold Burt Locke, Royal Garrison Artillery
- Captain Neville Hadley Bernard Lyon, Middlesex Regiment
- Lieutenant William John Conybeare Macaulay, King's Royal Rifle Corps
- Captain Ian Gordon Macbean, Nottinghamshire and Derbyshire Regiment
- Captain Fergus Macdonald, Army Service Corps
- Captain Alexander John Lindsay Macgregor, Yeomanry
- Temp. Captain Ernest Campbell Mackellar, Army Service Corps
- Captain Kenneth Edward Birdee Mackenzie-Kennedy, North Staffordshire Regiment
- 2nd Lieutenant Brice Bunny Mackinnon, Royal Highlanders
- Temp. Lieutenant Primrose McConnell, Royal Field Artillery
- Rev. Robert McGuinness, Army Chaplains' Department
- Captain John Lawrence McLennan, Army Service Corps
- Lieutenant William Henry Morrison, Yeomanry
- Temp. Captain Roger John Kynaston Mott, Special List
- Temp. Captain Eli Page, Royal Field Artillery
- Temp. Lieutenant John Charles Palmer, East Lancashire Regiment
- Temp. Lieutenant Percy Caleb Cooper Parry, Royal Field Artillery
- Lieutenant Francis Rudolph Phillips, Yeomanry
- Temp. Captain Arthur Grosvenor Piddington, Royal Field Artillery
- Temp. Lieutenant Charles Reginald Redgrave, Machine Gun Corps
- Temp. Captain George Hamilton Richards, Royal Engineers
- Temp. Captain Harold George Rickwood, Royal Lancaster Regiment
- Temp. Captain John William Riddoch Royal Army Medical Corps
- Captain Frank Hubert Robbins, Royal Army Medical Corps
- Lieutenant William Robertson, Argyll and Sutherland Highlanders
- Rev. Thomas Henry Foorde Russell Buckworth Royse, Army Chaplains' Department
- Captain George Rivers Russell, Royal Field Artillery
- 2nd Lieutenant Robert Bruys Sandilands, East Kent Regiment
- Captain Richard Montagu Lawrence Scott, Cheshire Regiment
- Captain William Scott-Watson, Royal Field Artillery
- Captain Frank Scroggie Royal Army Medical Corps
- Temp. Lieutenant Martin Hollis Shanks, Suffolk Regiment and Machine Gun Corps
- Captain Robert Glen Shaw Royal Army Medical Corps
- Lieutenant Frederick Francis Cherrett Shepherd, Royal Field Artillery
- Lieutenant George Gerard Shiel, Northumberland Fusiliers, and Machine Gun Corps
- Temp. Lieutenant Kenneth Graham Sillar, Royal Engineers
- Temp. Lieutenant James Skelton Smith, Royal Engineers
- Temp. Captain James Parker Stephenson-Jellie, Army Ordnance Depot
- Temp. Captain The Hon. Arthur Stuart, Machine Gun Corps
- Temp. Captain Charles Isaac Sutton, Royal Field Artillery
- Captain Archer Edward Tawney, Royal Garrison Artillery
- Captain Charles Clifford Tee, Royal Irish Rifles and Machine Gun Corps
- Temp. Captain Austin Gilchrist Thompson, South Lancashire Regiment
- Lieutenant William Howard Sandberg Tripp, Royal Engineers
- Temp. Captain Robert James Truter, Army Service Corps
- Temp. Lieutenant Harold Edgar Kenrick Wakefield, Royal Engineers
- Captain Claude Errington Wales, York and Lancaster Regiment
- Lieutenant Robert Peel Waller, Royal Field Artillery
- Captain Valentine Hutchinson Wardle, Royal Army Medical Corps
- Temp. 2nd Lieutenant Thomas Watson, Royal Engineers
- Temp. Lieutenant James Leslie Webster, Royal Garrison Artillery
- Temp. Lieutenant Hubert Victor Whittall, Spec. List
- Temp. Captain Valentine Wilkinson, Border Regiment
- Temp. Lieutenant Frederick Theophilus Williams, South Wales Borderers
- Temp. Captain James Leslie Dowker Williamson, attd. East Yorkshire Regiment
- Lieutenant Alan Wood, Royal Artillery
- Lieutenant John Edward Wood, Royal Field Artillery
- Captain Sidney Herbert Wright, Royal Garrison Artillery
- Temp. Lieutenant Straun Wright-Smith, Devonshire Regiment
- Temp. Captain William Henry York, Royal Engineers

For distinguished service in connection with Military Operations in Egypt —

- Lieutenant Ronald James Allan, Scottish Rifles
- Act. Subadar Alim-Sher, Hong Kong-Singapore, Royal Garrison Artillery
- Captain William Anderson, Highland Light Infantry
- Temp. Lieutenant Richard Hynman Andrew, Gen. List
- Temp. Captain Reginald Woodward Andrews, Army Service Corps
- 2nd Lieutenant James Archibald DCM Imperial Camel Corps Brigade
- Captain William Percy Armitage, Dragoon Guards
- Captain Robert Douglas Baird, Rifle Brigade
- Captain Denis Haughton Bates, Yeomanry
- Captain Douglas Wales Berry Royal Army Medical Corps
- 2nd Lieutenant William Tulloch Bichan, Royal Scots
- Hon. Captain John Moor Brewis, Army Ordnance Depot
- Captain Frederick Gerald Bright, Essex Regiment
- Lieutenant Arthur Anthony Brown, Royal Field Artillery
- Temp. 2nd Lieutenant Edward Hull Burbidge, Army Service Corps
- Lieutenant William Wood Burkett, Yeomanry
- Lieutenant Edward North Buxton, Royal Horse Artillery
- Captain Patrick Maitland Campbell, Yeomanry
- Quarter Master and Hon. Lieutenant Algernon James Canvin, Yeomanry
- Temp. Lieutenant Augustus Joseph Cherry, Royal Engineers
- Temp. Lieutenant Harold Claude Clements, Machine Gun Corps
- Captain Norman Coates, Royal Warwickshire Regiment
- Temp. Captain Leonard Walter Cox, Army Service Corps
- Lieutenant William Henry Pryse Craig, Royal Engineers
- Lieutenant Gilbert Howell Davies, Royal Engineers
- Lieutenant Joseph Albert de Rosse, Indian Army Reserve of Officers
- Temp. Lieutenant Ralph Thomas Edge, Royal Engineers
- Lieutenant John Herbert Conrad Faire, Army Service Corps
- Lieutenant William Guy Fison, Royal Field Artillery
- Captain Walter Wortley Flatt, Norfolk Regiment
- Lieutenant Oscar Ernest German, Yeomanry
- Temp. Captain Raymond Gwynne Goslett, Army Service Corps
- Lieutenant Ivor Garlake Gott, Royal Field Artillery
- Lieutenant Bernard Hilliard Frederick Edward Hayden, Royal Welsh Fusiliers, and Machine Gun Corps
- Lieutenant John Henderson, Argyll and Sutherland Highlanders
- Captain Charles Offley Harvey, Indian Cavalry
- Jemadar Hasan Shah, Indian Cavalry
- Lieutenant Charles Swainson Heywood, Army Corps of Clerks
- Captain Charles Holland, Army Veterinary Corps
- Captain Geoffrey Michael Hooper, London Regiment
- Lieutenant Stafford Vere Hotchkin, Royal Horse Artillery
- Captain Humphrey Francis Humphreys Royal Army Medical Corps
- Captain George Erskine Jackson, Yeomanry
- Temp. Captain Ambrose Keevil, Royal Munster Fusiliers
- Temp. Lieutenant Alexander Herbert Killick, Machine Gun Corps (Lieutenant, South Lancashire Regiment)
- Temp. Lieutenant Marshall Leonard Ireland Kingston, Royal Warwickshire Regiment
- Temp. Captain Archibald Henry Robert Montgomery Laird, Army Service Corps
- Temp. Lieutenant Thomas Stevenson Lancaster, Royal Engineers
- Lieutenant Alfred Noel Law, Northamptonshire Regiment
- Captain William Stephenson Lornie, Army Veterinary Corps
- Captain William Oliver Luscombe, Rifle Brigade
- Temp. 2nd Lieutenant Eustace D. Machray, Spec. List
- Lieutenant Robert Weir Macpherson, Royal Engineers
- Lieutenant Robert McCash, Yeomanry
- Lieutenant William Ewart McGregor, Army Service Corps
- Lieutenant Robert William Mitchell, Royal Engineers
- Temp. 2nd Lieutenant Hugh Jocelyn Grosvenor Monro, Army Service Corps
- Lieutenant Edward Davies Moore, Yeomanry, attd. Machine Gun Corps
- Lieutenant John Watcyn Morgan, Royal Engineers
- Temp. Lieutenant George William Murray, Gen. List
- Captain William Lenox Naper, Royal Horse Guards
- Lieutenant Sydney Naylor, Manchester Regiment
- Captain Arthur Charles Burnaby Neate, Royal Garrison Artillery
- Lieutenant Olive Needell, Essex Regiment, and Machine Gun Corps
- Quarter Master and Hon. Lieutenant George William Olden, Gen. List
- Lieutenant Howell Owen, Royal Field Artillery
- Lieutenant Hugh Lloyd Owen, East Lancashire Regiment, and Machine Gun Corps
- Lieutenant Lord Victor William Paget, Royal Horse Guards
- Temp. Lieutenant Norman Kingsley Pearce, Royal Engineers
- Lieutenant Herbert Perowne, Yeomanry
- Captain Cyril Eaton Petley, Royal Army Medical Corps
- Lieutenant Arthur Edward Powell, Indian Army Reserve of Officers
- Temp. Captain Allan Stephen Quartermaine, Royal Engineers
- Temp. Captain Robert Wallace Simpson, Army Veterinary Corps
- Captain Percy Sheldon, Cheshire Regiment
- Captain Reginald Henry Macaulay Abel Smith, Yeomanry
- Captain Percy Cyril Snatt, Liverpool Regiment
- Lieutenant Reginald James Stranger, Royal Irish Fusiliers
- Temp. Captain William Llewellyn Thomas, British West Indies Regiment
- Captain Arthur Malcolm Trustram Eve, Royal Welsh Fusiliers
- Lieutenant William Vincent, Army Service Corps
- Temp. Captain Hope Brankston Viney, Army Service Corps
- Temp. Lieutenant Henry Charles Waghorn, Royal Engineers
- Captain Thomas Watters, North Lancashire Regiment
- Captain Arnold John Wells, Army Service Corps
- Captain Charles Pullar Will, Scottish Rifles and Machine Gun Corps
- Temp. Captain Frederick Christian Williams, Army Ordnance Depot
- Lieutenant Claud Herbert Williams, Yeomanry, and Machine Gun Corps
- Captain John Workman Wintringham, Yeomanry, and Machine Gun Corps

Australian Imperial Force

- Lieutenant Holt Hardy, Light Horse Regiment
- Lieutenant Stanley Frank Howard, Imperial Camel Corps Brigade
- Quarter Master and Hon. Captain John Bede Moylan, Imperial Camel Corps Brigade
- Lieutenant Richard Kingsmill Moore, Imperial Camel Corps Brigade
- Captain Ernest Boscawen Ranclaud, Imperial Camel Corps Brigade

New Zealand Force

- 2nd Lieutenant Victor Emiel Adolph, Imperial Camel Corps Brigade

For distinguished services rendered in connection with Military Operations on the Indian Frontier. (Dated 1 January 1918)—

- Captain Alexander Sutherland Mackay, Gurkha Rifles, Indian Army
- 2nd Lieutenant Chandra Bahadur Karki, Nepalese Rifles

For distinguished services rendered in connection with Military Operations in Russia—

- 2nd Lieutenant John Joseph Hitching, London Regiment
- Captain Herbert Evelyn Lee, Gen. List
- Temp. 2nd Lieutenant Sir Victor Alexander George Anthony Warrender Bt Gen. List

For valuable services rendered in connection with Military Operations in Italy —

- Temp Captain Francis John Allen Royal Army Medical Corps
- Temp Captain Robert Carr Allinson, Army Veterinary Corps
- Captain Llewellyn Augustus Arthur Alston, Royal Welsh Fusiliers
- Temp 2nd Lieutenant William Thomas Anderson, Middlesex Regiment, attd. Machine Gun Corps
- 2nd Lieutenant Alfred Andrews, Royal Garrison Artillery
- 2nd Lieutenant William Henry Ablin, Royal West Surrey Regiment
- Rev. Leonard John William Babb, Army Chaplains' Department
- Temp Captain Lawrence Weir Bain Royal Army Medical Corps
- Lieutenant Reginald Herbert Ball, Gloucestershire Regiment
- 2nd Lieutenant William Barraclough, Dragoons, attd. West Yorkshire Regiment
- Temp Captain Cyril Ward Bartlett, Nottinghamshire & Derbyshire Regiment
- Lieutenant Frederick George Batty, Yorkshire Regiment
- Hon. Lieutenant and Quartermaster William Lack Bayes, Royal Warwickshire Regiment
- Lieutenant Francis Cuvelje Bedwell, West Yorkshire Regiment
- Captain Hugh Sam Benyon, Yeomanry
- Temp Captain Peter Bergheim, Royal Garrison Artillery
- Temp Captain Herbert Hillel Berlandina, Royal Engineers
- Lieutenant Thomas Hume Bischoff, Royal Field Artillery
- Lieutenant Hugh Sudell Bloomer, Manchester Regiment, attd. Royal Warwickshire Regiment
- Temp Lieutenant Thomas William Brereton, Royal West Surrey Regiment
- 2nd Lieutenant Arthur Claude Brewitt, King's Own Scottish Borderers, attd. Machine Gun Corps
- Lieutenant Basil Herbert Bright, Worcestershire Regiment
- Lieutenant Henry James Casey, Royal Garrison Artillery
- Temp Lieutenant Neville Baldwin Chichester, Royal Engineers
- 2nd Lieutenant Tom Clark, Royal Engineers
- Lieutenant Walter George Clements, Royal Artillery
- Temp Captain Oswald Coope, Machine Gun Corps
- Lieutenant George Alfred Crowther, York and Lancaster Regiment
- Lieutenant Francis Rennie Daniel, Royal Field Artillery
- Temp Lieutenant Joseph Langley Davis, Northumberland Fusiliers
- Temp Surg. Captain Charles Gordon Deane, Br. West India Regiment
- Temp Lieutenant John William Dixon, Machine Gun Corps
- Temp Lieutenant Donovan Drewery, Durham Light Infantry
- Lieutenant Victor Fuller Eberle, Royal Engineers
- Lieutenant Harold Eccles, Royal Engineers
- Temp 2nd Lieutenant Vincent Edwards, attd. West Riding Regiment
- Captain Robinson Elsdale, Royal Engineers
- Temp Captain Hubert Sydney Emery, Middlesex Regiment
- Captain Morgan Paget Evans, Royal Artillery
- Lieutenant Walter Ogilvie Field, Royal Warwickshire Regiment
- Rev. Lucas Thomas Thompson Fisher, Army Chaplains' Department
- Captain Theodore Vandermere Fleming, Army Service Corps
- 2nd Lieutenant Arthur Ernest Fox, Royal Garrison Artillery
- Rev. Frederick George Freely, Army Chaplains' Department
- Lieutenant Alfred James Gamblen, W. India Regiment
- 2nd Lieutenant James Alexander Garvie, King's Own Scottish Borderers
- Captain Alan Keith, Gibson, Oxfordshire & Buckinghamshire Light Infantry
- Sergeant Major Harry King Gibson, King's Royal Rifle Corps, now Machine Gun Corps
- Lieutenant John Gordon Leslie Girdlestone, Devonshire Regiment
- Quartermaster S. Cecil Glanville, Honourable Artillery Company
- Quartermaster and Hon. Lieutenant Ephraim Walter Goulds, Royal West Kent Regiment
- Temp Lieutenant Eversley Bernard Green, Devonshire Regiment
- Temp Lieutenant George Donald Greenland, Norfolk Regiment
- Temp Lieutenant Kenneth MacIver Grierson, Manchester Regiment
- Lieutenant Harold Crichton-Stuart Grubb, Royal Irish Fusiliers, attd. Royal Engineers
- Captain Thomas John Guest, Royal West Kent Regiment
- Temp Captain William Edward Hallinan, Royal Army Medical Corps
- Lieutenant Charles Theodore Hudson Harrison, Gloucestershire Regiment
- Lieutenant Reginald Frederick Henderson, Spec. List (late Royal Marines)
- Lieutenant Herbert MacLaren Henry, Machine Gun Corps
- Quartermaster and Hon. Lieutenant Arthur Higham, Royal Fusiliers
- Lieutenant Albert Hoare, Royal Garrison Artillery
- Temp Lieutenant Simeon Holden, Manchester Regiment
- Lieutenant Maurice Joseph Holdsworth, Sussex Regiment
- Temp 2nd Lieutenant William Charles Holmes, Royal Fusiliers
- Temp Lieutenant Ashby Arthur William Hooper, Royal Artillery
- Temp Captain George Wren Howard, King's Royal Rifle Corps
- Lieutenant Leslie Hughes, Worcestershire Regiment, attd. Royal Engineers
- Sergeant Master William Hutchens, Royal Army Medical Corps
- Lieutenant George Brumwell Jameson, Royal Field Artillery
- Temp 2nd Lieutenant Samuel Ferguson Johnston. Durham Light Infantry
- Lieutenant Henry William Jones, Devonshire Regiment
- Quartermaster and Hon. Lieutenant Benjamin William Jordan, Royal West Surrey Regiment
- Temp Captain Walter Monckton Keesey, Royal Engineers
- Temp Lieutenant Bernard Burrows Kirby, Gloucestershire Regiment
- Lieutenant David Gordon Kydd, Royal Scots, attd. Machine Gun Corps
- Lieutenant Harry Percival Lane, Royal Field Artillery
- 2nd Lieutenant Sydney Claud Lam, Royal Berkshire Regiment
- Temp Lieutenant Charles Aikin Lawford, attd. South Staffordshire Regiment
- Temp Captain Henry Berry Lees, Royal Engineers
- Lieutenant Philip Edwin Leybourne, Hampshire Regiment
- Temp Lieutenant Walter Kingsbury Lucas, Royal Field Artillery
- Temp Captain Eric Alfred Lumley Royal Army Medical Corps
- Lieutenant William Arthur Mackenzie, Royal Field Artillery
- Temp Lieutenant James Elliott Furneaux Mann, Yorkshire Light Infantry
- Lieutenant Terence Leslie Manson, Royal West Surrey Regiment
- Temp Lieutenant John McKenzie Menzies, Royal Artillery
- Rev. Bernard McGarvey, Army Chaplains' Department
- Temp Lieutenant Arthur Gresham Modlock, Royal Field Artillery
- Lieutenant James Bruce Moir, Argyll & Sutherland Highlanders, attd. Machine Gun Corps
- Lieutenant Charles Cosmo Monkhouse, Royal Garrison Artillery
- Temp Lieutenant Alexander George Moms
- Lieutenant Harold Mortimer, Seaforth Highlanders, attd. Royal Warwickshire Regiment
- Lieutenant Ralph John Morton, Royal Artillery
- Captain Rowland William Nield, Worcestershire Regiment
- Lieutenant John Edmund Eckley Oakeley, Herefordshire Regiment, attd. Cheshire Regiment
- Company Sergeant Major Edward Oliver, South Staffordshire Regiment
- Captain John Wildman Orange-Bromehead, Yorkshire Light Infantry, attd. Royal Engineers
- Temp Lieutenant Kenneth Raymond Pelly, Army Service Corps
- Lieutenant James Allan Dyson Perrins, Welsh Guards
- 2nd Lieutenant Sidney Perry MM Royal West Surrey Regiment
- Temp Captain John Sydney Phillips, South Staffordshire Regiment
- 2nd Lieutenant Donald Henry Pickard, Middlesex Regiment
- Temp Captain Michael Patrick Power, Royal Army Medical Corps
- Temp Captain Geoffrey Lee Pyman DSO
- Temp Lieutenant Thomas James Redhead, Manchester Regiment
- Temp Captain Harold Digby Rees, Royal Warwickshire Regiment
- Temp Quartermaster and Hon. Lieutenant Harry Edward Reimann, King's Royal Rifle Corps
- Captain Douglass George Robb, Royal Engineers
- 2nd Lieutenant Alfred Sidney Roberts, Royal Warwickshire Regiment
- Quartermaster Sergeant Percival Laidler Robson, Durham Light Infantry
- Temp Lieutenant Harold Roper, Devonshire Regiment
- Temp Lieutenant Cecil Thomas Royle, Royal West Surrey Regiment
- 2nd Lieutenant Douglas Gordon Sharp, West Yorkshire Regiment
- Temp Lieutenant Frank Cecil Siddons, Royal Warwickshire Regiment
- Lieutenant Frederick Lester Sidebotham, Royal Engineers
- Captain Robert William Benjamin Simms, General List
- Quartermaster and Hon. Captain Ernest Smith, Norfolk Regiment
- Lieutenant George Henry Smith, Worcestershire Regiment
- Lieutenant Arland Christopher William Ussher Stanley, Royal Inniskilling Fusiliers, and Machine Gun Corps
- Captain Lionel Fenton Stephenson, South Staffordshire Regiment
- Captain Ludwig Siebert Benjamin Tasker Royal Army Medical Corps
- 2nd Lieutenant Arthur Alexander Taylor, Gloucestershire Regiment
- Lieutenant William Frederic Pattern Thomas, South Staffordshire Regiment
- 2nd Lieutenant Herbert Donald Thompson, South Staffordshire Regiment
- Temp Lieutenant Harold Greig Thompson
- Company Sergeant Major John Thomson, Argyll & Sutherland Highlanders
- Quartermaster and Hon. Captain Robert Thorne, Royal West Kent Regiment
- Lieutenant Maurice Charles Prendergast Vereker, Royal Artillery
- Lieutenant David Vyle, Royal Field Artillery
- Lieutenant Arthur Wales, Essex Regiment, attd. Trench Mortar Battery
- Temp Captain Harry Bernard Ward, Royal Engineers
- Temp Captain John Waring, Manchester Regiment
- Temp Captain Frank William Waydelin, Royal West Kent Regiment
- Captain Cyril Hackett Wilkinson, Coldstream Guards
- Lieutenant John Willatt, Machine Gun Corps
- Lieutenant Thomas Victor Williams, Duke of Cornwall's Light Infantry
- Temp 2nd Lieutenant Harold Wilson, Machine Gun Corps
- Sergeant Major William John Wilson, Royal Army Medical Corps
- Lieutenant Lord John Wodehouse, Lancers
- Temp 2nd Lieutenant Henry John Birks Woodfield, Royal Warwickshire Regiment
- Captain George Henry Wright, Leinster Regiment, attd. Machine Gun Corps
- Lieutenant John Egbert Young, Royal Garrison Artillery

South African Force

- Lieutenant Atholl Murray McGregor, South African Horse Artillery

==== Awarded a Bar to the Military Cross (MC*) ====
For services rendered in connection with Military Operations in France and Flanders —

- Lieutenant John Archibald MC Gordon Highlanders
- Captain Hugh Armitage Baker MC Royal Horse Artillery
- Temp Lieutenant Reginald Edward Bennett MC Royal Field Artillery
- Temp Captain William Henry Blackburn MC Royal Engineers
- 2nd Lieutenant John Humphrey Blackwell MC Bedfordshire Regiment
- 2nd Lieutenant Frank Bremner Callis MC Royal Garrison Artillery
- Temp 2nd Lieutenant Bertrand Stanley Carter MC Tank Corps
- Lieutenant Stephen William Chapman MC Royal Engineers
- Temp Captain William Cooper MC King's Own Yorkshire Light Infantry
- Lieutenant Conrad Vaisey Wathen Court MC Worcestershire Regiment
- Captain James Hardwicke Dyer MC Royal Engineers
- 2nd Lieutenant Arthur Henry Edgell MC Machine Gun Corps
- Captain Thomas Stokoe Elliot MC Royal Army Medical Corps
- Captain James John Pugh Evans MC Welsh Guards
- Lieutenant Arthur Harold Ewing MC East Yorkshire Regiment
- Lieutenant Donald Finlayson MC Yeomanry
- Captain William Thomas Gill MC Dragoon Guards
- Temp Captain Hugh Abbott Green MC Royal Inniskilling Fusiliers
- 2nd Lieutenant William Joshua Griggs MC Royal Garrison Artillery
- Lieutenant Robert Henry Warren Heard MC Irish Guards
- Lieutenant Alfred Leslie Herridge MC Lancashire Fusiliers, attd. Machine Gun Corps
- Temp Lieutenant Robert Carl Hobson MC Northumberland Fusiliers
- Temp 2nd Lieutenant Alexander Douglas Hume MC Royal Sussex Regiment, attd. Royal Fusiliers
- Captain Arthur Edmund Ironside MC Royal Army Medical Corps
- Temp Captain Cuthbert Charles Rydon Jacks MC Northumberland Regiment
- Lieutenant William Francis Jackson MC Royal Engineers, attd. Tank Corps
- Temp Captain George William Blomfield James MC Royal Army Medical Corps
- Temp Lieutenant Reginald Coldham Knight MC Tank Corps
- Lieutenant Walter James Knight MC London Regiment
- Captain Hugh Robert Lodge MC Royal Field Artillery, attd. Royal Field Artillery
- Temp Captain Daniel Eric Logan MC Royal Field Artillery
- 2nd Lieutenant John Leonard Loveridge MC Royal Berkshire Regiment seconded Tank Corps
- Temp Lieutenant Frederick John Mallett MC Royal Engineers
- Temp Lieutenant John Ewart March MC Royal Engineers
- Lieutenant Robert Richard McCartney MC Royal Field Artillery
- Temp 2nd Lieutenant Christopher Bentley Meadows MC Royal Lancaster Regiment
- Lieutenant Gerald Grimwood Mears MC Royal Garrison Artillery
- Temp Captain George Christian Meredith MC Cheshire Regiment
- Captain Hamilton Stephen Moore MC Royal Army Medical Corps
- Temp Captain Arthur Forde Nutting MC King's Royal Rifle Corps
- Lieutenant Alexander Paton MC Royal Garrison Artillery
- Temp Captain Samuel J. Price MC General List
- Captain Laurence James Leslie Pullar MC Seaforth Highlanders, attd. Machine Gun Corps
- Lieutenant John William Hay Robertson MC Royal Highlanders
- Captain Hugh Huntley Robinson MC Royal Army Medical Corps
- Captain John Rowe MC Royal Army Medical Corps
- Captain Philip Russell MC Royal Field Artillery
- Temp 2nd Lieutenant Alfred John. Shipton MC Royal Berkshire Regiment
- Temp Lieutenant John Bertie Smeltzer MC Machine Gun Corps
- Lieutenant George Stevens MC Royal Garrison Artillery
- Lieutenant Norman Thomas Thurston MC London Regiment
- Temp Lieutenant Stewart Power Trench MC Royal Field Artillery
- Lieutenant Harold Runciman Turner MC Royal Garrison Artillery
- Quartermaster and Hon. Captain Stephen Watson MC Royal Highlanders
- Captain Ronald Eliot Wilson MC Yorkshire and Lancaster Regiment

Canadian Force

- Captain Alexander Watson Baird MC Central Ontario Regiment

Australian Imperial Force

- Captain Francis Edward Fairweather MC Infantry
- Lieutenant James Henry Julin MC Infantry

=== Distinguished Flying Cross (DFC) ===
- Lieutenant William Hopton Anderson (Australian Flying Corps)
- Lieutenant David Claud Bauer
- Lieutenant Claver Victor Bessett
- Lieutenant Robert Alexander Birkbeck
- Lieutenant John Geoffrey Sadler Candy
- Lieutenant Bernard Purvis-Broackes Carter
- Lieutenant Douglas Colyer
- Captain Robert John Orton Compston DSO
- Lieutenant Maurice Lea Cooper
- Major Jack Armand Cunningham
- Captain Roydon Englefield Ashford Dash
- Lieutenant John Charles Oswald Dickson
- Lieutenant Thomas Howell French
- Lieutenant George Cecil Gardener
- Lieutenant Harold Harrison Gonyou
- Lieutenant John Edmund Greene
- Lieutenant Frederick George Darby Hards DSO
- Lieutenant Francis Herbert Ronald Henwood
- Lieutenant Gordon Frank Hyams
- Captain Allen Murray Jones MC (Australian Flying Corps)
- Lieutenant Ernest James-Jones (Australian Flying Corps)
- Lieutenant Harold Aidan Laycock
- Lieutenant George Chisholme Mackay
- Lieutenant William Man
- Lieutenant John Stanley Fleming Morrison
- Lieutenant Philip John Nolan
- Lieutenant Thomas Cooper Pattinson
- Lieutenant Arthur Henry Pearce
- Lieutenant Edward Robert Pennell
- Lieutenant Samuel Richard Penrose-Welsted
- Lieutenant Cecil Lodge Philcox
- Lieu tenant John William Pinder
- Captain John Robinson
- Lieutenant Charles Basil Slater Spackman
- Captain David Edmund Stodart
- Lieutenant Denys Lane Paschel Stuart Stuart-Shepherd
- Lieutenant Leonard Thomas Eaton Taplin (Australian Flying Corps)
- Captain Awdry Morris Vaucour MC
- Lieutenant Stephen Wynne Vickers MC
- Lieutenant William Young Walls
- Lieutenant Bert Sterling
- Temp Lieutenant Laurence Arthur Wingfield
- Lieutenant Basil Raymond Worthington
- Lieutenant George Frederick
- William Zimmer

=== Distinguished Flying Medal (DFM) ===
- Acting Air Mechanic Albert Edward Clark (Woodford)
- Sergeant John Charles Hagan (Ulverston)

=== Air Force Cross ===
- Lieutenant Valentine Henry Baker MC
- Captain Robert Benedict Bourdillon MC
- Major-General William Sefton Brancker
- Major Charles Dempster Breese
- Lieutenant Henry Duncan Davis
- Lieutenant Robert William Dobbie
- Lieutenant Llewellyan Lewis Meredith Evans
- Major The Honourable William Francis Forbes-Sempill, Master of Sempill
- Captain Percy Edward Lovell Gethin
- Lieutenant-Colonel Robert Marsland Groves DSO
- Lieutenant Thomas Hayes
- Lieutenant Albert Goodeff Henshaw
- Captain Bennett Melville Jones
- Lieutenant Walter Hunt Longton
- Lieutenant Archibald Charles Lutyens MC
- Lieutenant Laurence Newton Mitchell
- Lieutenant John Oliver
- Captain Humphrey Rivaz Raikes
- Major Robert Raymond Smith-Barry
- Lieutenant Charles Gordon Sturt
- Lieutenant Terence Bernard Tully

=== Air Force Medal ===
- Sergeant Samuel James Mitchell (Handsworth, Birmingham)
- Sergeant Frederick Charles Tucker (Birtley, Durham)

=== Kaisar-i-Hind Medal ===
First Class

- Reverend Herbert Anderson, Secretary, Calcutta Temperance Federation and Indian Secretary, Baptist Missionary Society, and Member, Licensing Board, Bengal
- Robert Alexander Boswell Chapman, Indian Civil Service, Deputy Commissioner, Yavatmal, Central Provinces and Berar
- Henry Newton Crouch, Additional Judicial Commissioner, Sindh, Bombay State
- Seth Jai Dayal, of Mohiuddinpur, Sitapur, United Provinces
- Reverend Elias William Kelly Missionary, Superintendent, Judson Boys High School, Moulmein, Burma
- Reverend Canon Cecil Stansfeld Rivington, Bombay
- Reverend Father Louis Van Hoeck, SJ Rector, Roman Catholic Mission, Ranchi, Bihar and Orissa
- Sister Mary Victoria, Clewer Sisters of St John the Baptist, Principal, Diocesan College for Indian Girls at Ballygunge, Calcutta
- Margaret Vernon.

=== Imperial Service Order (ISO) ===
Home Civil Service

- George Boyd, First Assistant Registrar of Deeds, Ireland
- William Brown, Assistant Controller of Stamps, Stocks Exchange and Lloyd's
- John Crombie, Sub-Inspector of Schools, Scotland
- Alfred Robert Dryhurst, Assistant Secretary, British Museum
- Edwin Gilbert, Accountant, Charity Commission
- Frederick William Barnard Godrich, Principal Clerk, Public Works Loan Board
- Haywood Temple Holmes MVO Accountant, Treasury
- Robert George Lundy, Cashier, War Office
- Charles Herbert Niblett, Librarian, Colonial Office
- John Thomas Samuel, Deputy Chief Inspector, Customs and Excise
- George William Sellar, Superintending Clerk, Standards Department
- John Wilkinson Shergold, Postmaster Surveyor of Birmingham
- William John Henderson Sinclair Medical Officer, Barlinnie Prison
- William Goodyear Wightman, Assistant Controller, H.M. Stationery Office

Colonial Civil Service

- Philip Lawton Hinds Archer, Controller of Customs of the Gold Coast Colony
- Francis Kent Bennetts, Assistant Clerk of the King's Privy Council for Canada
- Alfred Earle Burt, late Registrar of Titles and Deeds, State of Western Australia
- Harry Walton Collymore, Chief Clerk, Colonial Secretary's Office, Island of Barbados
- John Edward de Silva Surya Bandara, lately Commissioner of Requests and Police Magistrate, Kalutara, Island of Ceylon
- Robert West Holmes MInstCE Engineer-in Chief, Public Works Department, Dominion of New Zealand
- Ernest Frederick Jarvis, Assistant Deputy Minister, Department of Militia and Defence, Dominion of Canada
- Thomas Augustus Thompson, Registrar of the Supreme Court, Colony of Trinidad and Tobago
- Percy Whitton, Collector of Customs, Victoria; Department of Trade and Customs, Commonwealth of Australia

Indian Civil Service

- John Richardson Atkinson, Attorney-at-Law, Deputy Registrar, High Court of Judicature, Madras
- Henry George Street Brooks, Assistant to the Superintendent of the Indian Store Depot, Senior Assistant Surgeon and Honorary Major Michael Courtney, Indian Subordinate Medical Department, Superintendent, Central Jail, Montgomery, Punjab.
- Raj Ganga Charan Chatterjee, Bahadur, Magistrate and Collector, Pabna, Bengal
- Maung Me Headquarters Assistant to Deputy Commissioner, Tharrawaddy, Extra Assistant Commissioner, 4th Grade, Burma.
- George Herbert Cockman, Military Accounts Department
- Raj Bahadur Gyanendra Nath Chakravarti Inspector of Schools, Benares, United Provinces
- Raj Abinas Chandra Khan Bahadur, Senior Superintendent in the Home Department of the Government of India
- Reginald Medlycott, Registrar, Office of the Inspector General of Police, Bengal
- Antony Marcel Peris, Registrar, Office of the Resident in Mysore, Mysore Residency
- Gerald Eyre Wilson, late Registrar, Office of the Private Secretary to His Excellency the Viceroy

=== Royal Red Cross (RRC) ===
First Class

- Margaret Emma Goodall-Copestake, Superintending Sister, Queen Alexandra's Royal Naval Nursing Service
- Muriel G. Hutton, Nursing Sister, Queen Alexandra's Royal Naval Nursing Service, Reserve

In recognition of valuable services with the Armies in France and Flanders —

- Alberta Beatrice Armstrong, Canadian Army Medical Corps Sister.
- Mary Bishop, Acting Sister, Queen Alexandra's Imperial Military Nursing Service
- Marion Jane Branson, Sister, Queen Alexandra's Imperial Military Nursing Service
- Jessie Maud Cardozo, Sister-in-Charge, Territorial Force Nursing Service
- Sarah Jane Cockrell, Matron, Territorial Force Nursing Service
- Bessie Hooper Daniels, Acting Sister, Civilian Hospital Reserve
- Isabel Georgina Eveleigh, Sister, Territorial Force Nursing Service
- Margaret Isobel Gordon, Acting Sister, Civilian Hospital Reserve
- Katherine Macfadyen Hager, Matron, American Nursing Service, Harvard Unit
- Una Russell Lee, Sister-in-Charge, Queen Alexandra's Imperial Military Nursing Service (R.)
- Kate Maxey, Sister-in-Charge, Territorial Force Nursing Service
- Alice Edith Milburn, Sister, Territorial Force Nursing Service
- Margaret Morton, Matron, British Royal Red Cross
- Margaret Anne Newbould, Asst. Matron, Territorial Force Nursing Service
- Lillian Pidgeon, Sister, Canadian Army Medical Corps
- Bessie Rankin, Sister, Queen Alexandra's Imperial Military Nursing Service (retd.)
- Kathleen Shaw, Sister, Canadian Army Medical Corps
- Olive Florence Stinton, Sister, Queen Alexandra's Imperial Military Nursing Service
- Jeannie Cook Strachan, Acting Sister, Queen Alexandra's Imperial Military Nursing Service (R.)
- Cecily Varena Elma Thompson ARRC Sister, Queen Alexandra's Imperial Military Nursing Service
- Katherine Corstorphine Todd, Sister, Territorial Force Nursing Service
- Madeleine Hamilton Watts, Sister, Territorial Force Nursing Service
- Anna Weatherstone, Acting Sister, Civilian Hospital Reserve
- Margaret Mary Denison Weir, Asst. Matron, Territorial Force Nursing Service
- Gwendoline Williams, Acting Sister-in-Charge, Queen Alexandra's Imperial Military Nursing Service (R.)

In recognition of valuable services with the British Forces in Salonika—

- Marion Shaw Andrew, Sister-in-Charge, Territorial Force Nursing Service
- Constance Eliza Baigent, Act. Sister. Queen Alexandra's Imperial Military Nursing Service (Reserve)
- Elizabeth Baillie, Sister, Queen Alexandra's Imperial Military Nursing Service (Reserve)
- Winifred Blanchard, Asst. Matron, Queen Alexandra's Imperial Military Nursing Service (Reserve)
- Ethel Kate Buchanan, Sister-in-Charge, Territorial Force Nursing Service
- Beryl Anderson Campbell, Matron, Australian Army Nursing Service
- Cecilia Evans, Staff Nurse, Queen Alexandra's Imperial Military Nursing Service (Reserve)
- Jessie Spittall ARRC Sister, Territorial Force Nursing Service
- Mildred Lucy Wells, Sister, Queen Alexandra's Imperial Military Nursing Service (Reserve)

In recognition of valuable services with the British Forces in Egypt —

- Florence Mary Dodery, Sister, Queen Alexandra's Imperial Military Nursing Service (Reserve)

Second Class

- Alice Marion England, Staff Nurse, Royal Navy Hospital, Mount Stuart, Isle of Bute
- Ellen Kate Finnemore, Matron, Queen Mary's Royal Navy Hospital, Southend
- Isabella Frame Lang, Theatre Sister, Royal Navy Hospital, Mount Stuart, Isle of Bute
- Sarah Edith McClelland, Nursing Sister, Queen Alexandra's Royal Naval Nursing Service
- Elsie Christian Philp, Matron, Northern Infirmary, Inverness
- Elizabeth Ritchie, Matron, Auxiliary Naval Hospital, Grangetown, Yorkshire
- Vera L. Spark, Nursing Sister, Queen Alexandra's Royal Naval Nursing Service, Reserve
- Zoe E. Strange, Nursing Sister, Queen Alexandra's Royal Naval Nursing Service, Reserve
- Margaret Christine Tod, Matron and Masseuse, Royal Navy Auxiliary Hospital, Corstorphine, Edinburgh

In recognition of valuable services with the Armies in France and Flanders —

- Lydia Abell, Staff Nurse, Queen Alexandra's Imperial Military Nursing Service (R.)
- Edna Mabel Augier, Sister, Canadian Army Medical Corps
- Violet Barugh, Sister, Territorial Force Nursing Service
- Marion Sabina Bar-well, Sister-in-Charge, Queen Alexandra's Imperial Military Nursing Service (R.)
- Muriel Adelaide Batey, British Royal Red Cross, Voluntary Aid Detachment
- Edith Francis Beedie, Acting Sister, Queen Alexandra's Imperial Military Nursing Service (R.)
- Charlotte Mary Bindloss, Sister, Territorial Force Nursing Service
- Katherine Bishop, Voluntary Aid Detachment
- Mary Forster Bliss, Sister, Canadian Army Medical Corps
- Mildred Natalie Bowden-Smith, Voluntary Aid Detachment
- May Ethel Boyd, Voluntary Aid Detachment
- Irene Constance Brady, Sister, Canadian Army Medical Corps
- May Bragg, Acting Sister, Queen Alexandra's Imperial Military Nursing Service (R.)
- Ellen Elizabeth Branson, Acting Sister, Civilian Hospital Reserve
- Amy May Browett, Acting Sister, Queen Alexandra's Imperial Military Nursing Service (R.)
- Frances Louise Brown, Charge Sister, British Royal Red Cross
- Mary Rose Bunting, Sister, Territorial Force Nursing Service
- Annie Irvine Buyers, Sister, Queen Alexandra's Imperial Military Nursing Service
- Gertrude Walters Carlin, Sister, Territorial Force Nursing Service
- Elsie Violet Cassidy, Acting Sister, Civilian Hospital Reserve
- Susan Clarke, Acting Sister, Queen Alexandra's Imperial Military Nursing Service (R.)
- Sarah Clements, Voluntary Aid Detachment
- Ruby Cockburn, Charge Sister, British Royal Red Cross
- Mary Cockshott, Sister, Territorial Force Nursing Service
- Blanche Cresswick, Sister, Australian Army Nursing Service
- Isobel Davies, Sister, Canadian Army Medical Corps
- Mary Ellen Davis, Sister, Queen Alexandra's Imperial Military Nursing Service
- Sarah Melanie De Mestre, Sister, Australian Army Nursing Service
- Irene May Denson, Staff Nurse, Queen Alexandra's Imperial Military Nursing Service (R.)
- Bessie Mitchell Dickson, Acting Sister, Civilian Hospital Reserve
- Constance Amy Ebden, Nursing Sister, South African Medical NursingService
- Agnes McCheyne Edgar, Acting Sister, Civilian Hospital Reserve
- Mildred Edwards, Sister, Territorial Force Nursing Service
- Nettie Eisenhard, Nurse, U.S.A. Nursing Corps
- Ellen Maude Emberson, Sister, Territorial Force Nursing Service
- Hulda Inglejard Enebuske, Sister, American Nursing Service
- Annie Wood Falconer, Acting Sister, Queen Alexandra's Imperial Military Nursing Service (R.)
- Helen Graham Findlay Fisher, Acting Sister, Civilian Hospital Reserve
- Evelyn Ruth Garnett, Voluntary Aid Detachment
- Elizabeth Geoghegan, Sister, Australian Army Nursing Service
- Ann Isabella Gibb, Acting Sister, Queen Alexandra's Imperial Military Nursing Service (R.)
- Ida Mary Grant, British Royal Red Cross
- Annice Gray, Acting Sister, Queen Alexandra's Imperial Military Nursing Service (R.)
- Lily Naomi Gray, Sister, Canadian Army Medical Corps
- Margaret Hannah Griffiths, Acting Sister, Queen Alexandra's Imperial Military Nursing Service (R.)
- Christina MacKay Gunn, Staff Nurse, Queen Alexandra's Imperial Military Nursing Service (R.)
- Ursula Alice Hall, Voluntary Aid Detachment
- Louisa. Hanson, Acting Sister, Civilian Hospital Reserve
- Florence Mary Harper, Voluntary Aid Detachment
- Mary Alice Hayes, Theatre Sister, British Royal Red Cross
- Theresa Mary Hayes, Sister, Territorial Force Nursing Service
- Mabel Vesper Heard, Sister, Territorial Force Nursing Service
- Maud Littleton Heathcote, Voluntary Aid Detachment
- Clara Henderson, British Royal Red Cross
- Elizabeth Irwin Henry, Voluntary Aid Detachment
- Helen Joy Hinckley, Sister, American Nursing Serv
- Rosina Mabel Hook, Sister-in-Charge, Queen Alexandra's Imperial Military Nursing Service (R.)
- Isabella Rutherford Inglis, Acting Sister, Queen Alexandra's Imperial Military Nursing Service (R.)
- Lilian Mary Jenkins, Acting Sister, Civilian Hospital Reserve
- May Gwendoline Keen, Sister-in-Charge, Territorial Force Nursing Service
- Alice Ross King, Sister, Australian Army Nursing Service
- Annie Vanette Robertson Kydd, Voluntary Aid Detachment
- Fanny Law, Charge Sister, British Royal Red Cross
- Violet Law, Acting Sister, Queen Alexandra's Imperial Military Nursing Service (R.)
- Marion Leppard, Acting Sister, Civilian Hospital Reserve
- Elizabeth Georgina Lowe, Sister-in-Charge, Queen Alexandra's Imperial Military Nursing Service
- Marie Dow Lutwick, Acting Sister, Queen Alexandra's Imperial Military Nursing Service (R.)
- Mary Lyster, Voluntary Aid Detachment
- Beatrice Macdonald, Nurse, U.S.A. Nursing Corps
- Henrietta Mackay, Acting Sister, Civilian Hospital Reserve
- Edith Duncan Mackenzie, Acting Sister, Queen Alexandra's Imperial Military Nursing Service (R.)
- Katherine Mackenzie, Acting Sister, Civilian Hospital Reserve
- Margaret Cameron MacLean, Sister, Territorial Force Nursing Service
- Christina Macrae, Sister (Asst. Matron), Queen Alexandra's Imperial Military Nursing Service
- Lois Marsden, Asst. Matron, British Royal Red Cross
- Theodora Marsh, Voluntary Aid Detachment
- Hilda Martin, Voluntary Aid Detachment
- Emma Osborne Masters, Voluntary Aid Detachment
- Sadie Charlotte. McDonald, Sister, Australian Army Nursing Service
- Harriet Miller, Acting Sister-in-Charge, Queen Alexandra's Imperial Military Nursing Service (R.)
- Gertrude Edith Mirrington, Voluntary Aid Detachment
- Nellie Constance Morrice, Head Sister, Australian Army Nursing Service
- Ruth Eleanore Nicholas, British Royal Red Cross
- Mabel Noyes, Sister, American Nursing Serv
- Beatrice Muriel Nye, Sister (Asst. Matron), Queen Alexandra's Imperial Military Nursing Service
- Jane Jessie Arthur Paul, Acting Sister, Queen Alexandra's Imperial Military Nursing Service (R.)
- Elsie Clare Pidgeon, Sister, Australian Army Nursing Service
- Catherine Elizabeth Pierce, Nursing Sister, Canadian Army Medical Corps
- Florence Pierrepont, Sister, Territorial Force Nursing Service
- Florence Clarita Piza, Charge Sister, British Royal Red Cross
- Majorie Platt, Voluntary Aid Detachment
- Ethel Mary Poole, Acting Sister, Queen Alexandra's Imperial Military Nursing Service (R.)
- Lily Maud Privett, Voluntary Aid Detachment
- Bessie Duncan Blyth Reid, Acting Sister, Civilian Hospital Reserve (Edinburgh R. Infirmary)
- Frances Augusta Rice, Sister, Canadian Army Medical Corps
- Margaret Richardson, Voluntary Aid Detachment
- Charlotte Lilian Anne Robinson, Acting Sister, Queen Alexandra's Imperial Military Nursing Service
- Mary Jane Roche, Nurse, U.S.A. Nursing Corps
- Molly Ruddock, Charge Sister, British Royal Red Cross
- Susan Eva Sanctuary, Voluntary Aid Detachment
- Margaret Wilson Savage, Sister, Territorial Force Nursing Service
- Ino Skinner, Staff Nurse, Queen Alexandra's Imperial Military Nursing Service (R.)
- Wilhelmina Soiling, Acting Sister, Queen Alexandra's Imperial Military Nursing Service (R.)
- Gwendolin Spalding, Sister, Canadian Army Medical Corps
- Frances Ann Spedding, Acting Sister, Civilian Hospital Reserve
- Evelyn Zaida Stubington, British Royal Red Cross
- Barbara Sythes, Acting Sister, Civilian Hospital Reserve
- Edith Gertrude Taylor, Voluntary Aid Detachment
- Katharine Rosa Tompson, Voluntary Aid Detachment
- Hester Trimble, British Royal Red Cross, Voluntary Aid Detachment
- Jane Elizabeth Trotter, Acting Sister, Queen Alexandra's Imperial Military Nursing Service (R.)
- Dorothy Frances Webb, Staff Nurse, Australian Army Nursing Service
- Mary Evelyn Wedderspoon, Acting Sister, Queen Alexandra's Imperial Military Nursing Service (R.)
- Martha Whent, Matron, British Royal Red Cross
- Florence Elizabeth Widdop, Sister, Territorial Force Nursing Service
- Alice Mary Willcox, Charge Sister, British Royal Red Cross
- Mabel Alice Williams Acting Sister, Civilian Hospital Reserve
- Marjorie Williams, Voluntary Aid Detachment
- Nellie Williamson, Voluntary Aid Detachment
- Eliza Workman, Nursing Sister, British Royal Red Cross
- Eleanor Wyles, Asst. Matron, British Royal Red Cross
- Sarah Edith Young, Sister, Canadian Army Medical Corps
- Charlotte Younghusband, Sister, Canadian Army Medical Corps

In recognition of valuable services with the British Forces in Salonika—

- Alice Mary Fletcher, Sister, Queen Alexandra's Imperial Military Nursing Service (Reserve)
- Frances Muriel Hobbs, Sister, Queen Alexandra's Imperial Military Nursing Service (Reserve)
- Kathryn Mary Jordan, Sister, Queen Alexandra's Imperial Military Nursing Service (Reserve)
- Wilhelmina Lee, Staff Nurse, Queen Alexandra's Imperial Military Nursing Service (Reserve)
- Euphemia Scott Loraine, Staff Nurse, Queen Alexandra's Imperial Military Nursing Service (Reserve)
- Elizabeth Clark Neil, Sister, Territorial Force Nursing Service
- Florence Runton, Staff Nurse, Queen Alexandra's Imperial Military Nursing Service (Reserve)
- Christense Sorenson, Sister, Australian Army Nursing Service
- Marjory Stephenson, Superintendent (Prin. Commandant), Voluntary Aid Detachment
- Hannah. Elizabeth Stubbs, Staff Nurse, Territorial Force Nursing Service
- Maud Jane Todman, Sister, Queen Alexandra's Imperial Military Nursing Service (Reserve)
- Lizzie Varley, Sister, Queen Alexandra's Imperial Military Nursing Service (Reserve)

In recognition of valuable services with the British Forces in Egypt —

- Winifred Alice Attenborough, Act. Matron, Territorial Force Nursing Service
- Miss Elizabeth Mabel Bickerdike, Asst. Matron, Queen Alexandra's Imperial Military Nursing Service (Retired)
- Violett Annie Rutter, Asst. Matron, Territorial Force Nursing Service
- Marianne Liddell Slater, Asst. Matron, Queen Alexandra's Imperial Military Nursing Service (Reserve)

For valuable services rendered in connection with Military Operations in Italy —

- Isabelle Mary Baron, Nurse, Spec. Mil. Prob
- Elizabeth Bartholomew, Voluntary Aid Detachment
- Margaret. Russell Casswell, Matron, Queen Alexandra's Imperial Military Nursing Service
- Margaret Gale, Nurse, Voluntary Aid Detachment
- Margaret Edith Lyra Jameson, Voluntary Aid Detachment
- Mary Adelaide Christabel Robinson, Voluntary Aid Detachment Prob. S.J.A.B

==== Awarded a Bar to the Royal Red Cross ====
In recognition of valuable services with the Armies in France and Flanders —

- Kate Evelyn Luard RRC Sister-in-Charge, Queen Alexandra's Imperial Military Nursing Service (R.)

In recognition of valuable services with the British Forces on the Mediterranean Line of Communications—

- Elizabeth Ann Dowse RRC Matron, Queen Alexandra's Imperial Military Nursing Service

=== Distinguished Conduct Medal (DCM) ===
For distinguished services in connection with Military Operations with the British Forces in Egypt —

- Gunner J. Allan, Royal Garrison Artillery (Millport)
- Lance Captain J. Aylott, Royal Engineers (St. Albans)
- Sergeant Clement Victor Biddlecombe, Royal Engineers (Catford, S.E.)
- Sergeant J. H. Bromhead, Yeomanry (Clifton)
- Private F. Bryan, Army Veterinary Corps (Peplow)
- Sergeant J. E. Burbeck, Royal Engineers (Aberystwyth)
- Captain W. Byard, Leinster Regiment (Enfield)
- Corporal A. B. Chalkin, Royal Engineers (Tonbridge)
- Sergeant J. Clark, Honourable Artillery Company (Wanstead Park, N.E.)
- Gunner H. Crowther, Motor Machine Gun Corps (Dewsbury)
- Captain H. Crowther, Royal Engineers (Leeds)
- Private J. L. Evans, Shropshire Light Infantry (Minsterley)
- Lance Captain E. Fowler, Royal Engineers (Chard)
- Sergeant W. H. Grover, Royal Garrison Artillery (N. Ormsby)
- Lance Captain D. Harvey, Royal Engineers (Gillingham)
- Private J. Hope, British West Indies Regiment (Barbados)
- Captain Leonard Thomas Leybourne, Royal Army Medical Corps (Cambridge)
- Sergeant Major G. F. Lyon, Royal Army Medical Corps (Norwich)
- Staff Sergeant J. McKay, Royal Army Medical Corps (Aberdeen)
- Act. Captain F. Meade, Machine Gun Corps (Drogheda)
- Private R. H. Parry, Shropshire Light Infantry (Shrewsbury)
- H.K.S.B. Havildar Rur Singh, Hong Kong, Singapore Royal Garrison Artillery
- 2nd Captain A. E. Rogers, Royal Engineers (Bristol)
- Farrier Quarter Master S. P. Timmons, Royal Field Artillery (Dundee)
- Fttr. J. Walsh, Royal Field Artillery (Blackburn)
- Sergeant J. Wrench, North Lancashire Regiment (Bolton)
- Sergeant A. E. B. Younghusband, Yeomanry (Putney)

Australian Imperial Force

- Private P. H. Caine, Infantry
- Sergeant W. Cruickshank, Light Horse Regiment
- Sergeant F. G. H. Garrett, Light Horse Regiment
- Captain E. Holland, Engineers
- Squadron Sergeant Major K. Lawlor, Light Horse Regiment
- 2nd Captain R. McD. Leslie, Engineers
- Sergeant C. Robinson, Imperial Camel Corps Brigade
- Sergeant H. Welshman, Engineers
- Sergeant W. M. Wilkin, Imperial Camel Corps Brigade

New Zealand Force

- Sergeant L. D. Purves, Imperial Camel Corps Brigade

For distinguished service in connection with Military Operations with the Armies in France and Flanders —

- 2nd Corporal W. H. Adams, Royal Engineers (Yeovil)
- Private H. Ainsworth, Lancaster Regiment (Bolton)
- Sergeant C E. Alderson, Royal Engineers (Buxton)
- Sergeant F. Allen, Cheshire Regiment (Birmingham)
- Temp Sergeant Major H. Anderson, Army Cyclist Corps (Yarmouth)
- Gunner J Anderson, Royal Garrison Artillery (Walsall)
- Sergeant S. Andrews, Scottish Rifles (Dalkeith)
- Sergeant E. Ankers, Royal Engineers (Crewe)
- Sergeant Major W. Archer, King's Royal Rifle Corps (Letchworth)
- Sergeant Major G. T. Arlett, Oxfordshire & Buckinghamshire Light Infantry (Henley-on-Thames)
- Sergeant T. Armstrong, Army Service Corps (Upton Park, E.)
- Brigadier P. G. Arthur, Royal Garrison Artillery (Builth Wells)
- Private E. Ashley, Manchester Regiment (Blackburn)
- Sergeant W. Atkinson, Army Service Corps (Leeds)
- Sergeant J. W. Attridge, Royal Field Artillery (Battersea, S.W.)
- Sergeant Major P. H. Avey, London Regiment (Leytonstone)
- Acting Corporal E. Baillie, Royal Scots (Bonnyrigg)
- Sergeant C. J. W. Balderston, Royal Engineers (Leyton)
- Lance Corporal G. E. Balfe, Royal Engineers (Forest Hill, S.E.)
- Temp Sergeant Major J. Banner, Royal Field Artillery (Bolton)
- Fitter Staff Sergeant W. M. Bare, Royal Garrison Artillery (Swanscombe)
- Corporal A. E. Barker, Royal Engineers (Abingdon)
- Regimental Quartermaster Sergeant W. Barker, Nottinghamshire & Derbyshire Regiment (Bakewell)
- Gunner C. E. Barnes, Royal Field Artillery (S. Lambeth)
- Company Sergeant Major A. H. Barrell, London Regiment (Walthamstow)
- Company Sergeant Major J. P. Batey, Royal Engineers (Stockport)
- Sergeant Major H. Bealey, Royal Field Artillery (Weston-super-Mare)
- Lance Sergeant J. Beard, King's Own Shropshire Light Infantry (Oakengates)
- Sergeant J. Beattie MM Monmouthshire Regiment (Newcort)
- Sergeant F. Beaumont, Royal Field Artillery (Halifax)
- Corporal D. Beith, Royal Engineers (Paisley)
- Company Sergeant Major A. Bennett, Grenadier Guards (Birmingham)
- Sergeant W. J. Bennett, Liverpool Regiment (Liverpool)
- Sergeant W. Berry, Royal Field Artillery (City Road, London)
- Quartermaster Sergeant H. E. Bevans, Royal Army Medical Corps (St. Johns, S.E.)
- Sergeant E. Bibby, Royal Lancaster Regiment (Windermere)
- Corporal E. A. W. Bignell, Royal Engineers (Bulford)
- Corporal A. Birch, Royal Fusiliers (Longsight, Oldham)
- Regimental Quartermaster Sergeant J. Bird, Dragoon Guards (Hounslow)
- Sergeant J. S. Birkett, Yorkshire Regiment (Aylesbury)
- Private. C. G. Bishop, Royal Fusiliers (Islington)
- Lance Corporal C. Blackmore, Royal Engineers (Brixton, S.W.)
- Sergeant Major A. E. Bliss, Royal Field Artillery (U. Clapton)
- Sergeant Major C. A. Bliss, Royal Field Artillery (Southfields)
- Sergeant W. S. Boswell, Royal Engineers (Llanelly)
- Sergeant A. Boufler, Royal Garrison Artillery (Woolwich)
- Sergeant Major A. Boulter, Royal Field Artillery (Maidenhead)
- Private E. C. Bowkett, Royal Army Medical Corps (Manchester)
- Brigadier F. Bowling, Royal Garrison Artillery (Stockport)
- Gunner C. H. Bradbeer, Royal Field Artillery (Merton, S.W.)
- Sergeant G. G. Bradbury, Lancashire Fusiliers (Oldham)
- Sergeant Major H. A. Braddick, Royal Field Artillery (St. John's Wood)
- Corporal J. Bramwell, Royal Engineers (Bolton)
- Temp. Regimental Sergeant Major H. Brand, Cheshire Regiment (Glossop)
- Sergeant J. Brazier, Royal Field Artillery (Pimlico. S.W.)
- Corporal C. A. Brearley, Royal Engineers (Halifax)
- Sergeant J. C. Breeden, Royal Field Artillery (E. Leyton)
- Company Sergeant Major H. Breeze MM Royal Engineers (Helsby)
- Sergeant E. A, Brewer, Army Service Corps (Richmond, Surrey)
- Sergeant II. C. Bridge, Royal Field Artillery (Bristol)
- Sergeant W. J. Bridges, Royal Garrison Artillery (Homerton, N.E.)
- Private J. Brierley, Lancashire Fusiliers (Swinton)
- Sergeant Major W. T. Brierley, Royal Field Artillery (Plum-stead)
- Sergeant A. G. Briggs, Royal Field Artillery (Canning Town)
- Gunner H. Briggs, Royal Garrison Artillery (Leeds)
- Corporal A. E. Bright MM Coldstream Guards (Birmingham)
- Private H. Brindle, Royal Fusiliers (Coventry)
- Gunner (Lance Brigadier) E. Britton, Royal Field Artillery (Manchester)
- Private J. Broadfoot, Cameron Highlanders (Glasgow)
- Private J. B. Bromley, King's Own Shropshire Light Infantry (Pulverbatch)
- 2nd Corporal J. T. Bromley, Royal Engineers (Chiswick)
- Gunner E. Brook, Royal Field Artillery (Huddersfield)
- Corporal A. T. Brooks, Royal Engineers (Barry)
- Company Sergeant Major J. H. Broom, Corps (Gray's Inn Rd., London)
- Lance Brigadier D. Brown, Royal Field Artillery (Sunderland)
- Staff Sergeant J. Brown, Royal Army Medical Corps (Aberdeen)
- Sergeant J. J. Brown, West Riding Regiment (Skipton)
- Acting Quartermaster Sergeant A. Brownson, Cameron Highlanders (Inverness)
- Corporal G. S. Buckingham, Royal Engineers (Bristol)
- Company Sergeant Major T. Burbidge, Norfolk Regiment (Sydenham)
- Gunner P. Burke, Royal Garrison Artillery (Drinagh, Co. Cork)
- Temp Sergeant Major F. Burton, Northumberland Fusiliers (Newburn)
- Corporal J. R. Butts, Northamptonshire Regiment (Rushden)
- Sergeant S. Buxton, Royal Garrison Artillery (St. Helens, Isle of Wight)
- Company Sergeant Major A. C. Byfield, Middlesex Regiment (Edmonton)
- Lance Corporal J. W. Cameron, Royal Engineers (Leith)
- Corporal A. Camp MM Royal Field Artillery (Brighton)
- Sergeant J. Campbell, Machine Gun Corps (Frant)
- Corporal J. Carney, Royal Field Artillery (Pontefract)
- Lance Brigadier A. A. Carr, Royal Garrison Artillery (Battersea)
- Acting Regimental Sergeant Major C. Carr, Machine Gun Corps (Fulham)
- Lance Corporal B. Carter, Liverpool Regiment (Liverpool)
- Sergeant H. M. Cartwright, King's Own Scottish Borderers (Darlington)
- Private. J. P. Cassels, Army Service Corps (Parsley)
- Corporal J. Cassidy, Machine Gun Corps (Manchester)
- Private R. Casson, Border Regiment (Carlisle)
- Sergeant D. Charleson, Royal Army Medical Corps (Leith)
- Company Sergeant Major P. Chase, Lancashire Fusiliers (Hulme)
- Corporal W. Chilton, Worcestershire Regiment (Walsall)
- Sergeant A. J. Churchill, Royal Garrison Artillery (Salisbury)
- Company Sergeant Major W. Clarke, Royal Irish Rifles (Belfast)
- Sergeant W. Clarke, Middlesex Regiment (Tottenham)
- 2nd Corporal G. H. Clarkson, Royal Engineers (Barnsley)
- Sergeant W. Clouch, South Lancashire Regiment (Willieton)
- Sergeant Major P. Clune, Royal Garrison Artillery (Kilrush)
- Sergeant Major W. Cockrain, Essex Regiment (Nottingham)
- Private F. E. Cocks, London Regiment (Hendon)
- Company Sergeant Major G. Cocks, Lancashire Fusiliers (Hull)
- Company Quartermaster Sergeant L. H. Colbran, Army Service Corps (Cambridge)
- Temp. Sergeant Major W. D. Coldridge, Lancers (York)
- Temp Sergeant Major H. A. Coles, Royal Sussex Regiment (Cocking)
- Sapper C. B. Collier, Royal Engineers (Cowley)
- Lance Corporal H. A. Collison, Military Foot Police (Middlesbrough)
- Acting Sergeant J. Connery, Royal Irish Regiment (Kilmallock)
- Sergeant Major A. Cook, Royal Field Artillery (Kettering)
- Squadron Sergeant Major G. B. Cook, Hussars (Colchester)
- Acting Seaman T. Coombe RNVR (Durham)
- Regimental Quartermaster Sergeant A. G. Cooper, Somerset Light Infantry (Highbridge)
- Sergeant R. Coote, Nottinghamshire & Derbyshire Regiment (E. Derby)
- Sergeant T. Cordingley, Royal Garrison Artillery (Irlam)
- Sergeant P. Corish, Royal Irish Fusiliers (Dublin)
- Private R. C. Cotton, Seaforth Highlanders (Oxford)
- Private J. Cox, Worcestershire Regiment (Glastonbury)
- Corporal J. Cox, Royal Field Artillery (Bicester)
- Company Sergeant Major W. O. Cox, Machine Gun Corps (Ladywood)
- Sergeant A. Coyle, Army Corps of Clerks (Slade Lane)
- Company Sergeant Major R. Craig, King's Own Scottish Borderers (Edinburgh)
- Corporal F. A. Crane, Middlesex Regiment (Canning Town)
- Sergeant W. Crawford, Royal Engineers (Kelty)
- Sergeant C. B. Crocker, Royal Field Artillery (Chaterfield)
- Corporal H. J. Croome, Army Corps of Clerks (Gloucester)
- 2nd Corporal W. Crowe, Royal Engineers (Bishop Auckland)
- Sergeant A. Cundy, Royal Field Artillery (Nottingham)
- Sergeant Major T. Cunnew, Royal Garrison Artillery (Limehouse, E.)
- Sergeant F. Cuthbert, Tank Corps (Lether.ingham)
- Sergeant Major H. F. Cuthbert, Royal Garrison Artillery (Dover)
- Sapper J. R. K. Dacre, Royal Engineers (Freemantle, Australia)
- Private H. Dale, Duke of Cornwall's Light Infantry (Madrow)
- Sergeant A. E. Dalton, Royal Garrison Artillery (Jersey)
- Sergeant P. J. Daly, Irish Guards (Ballycallan)
- Sergeant Major L. Darch, Hussars (Pontypridd)
- Private F. Davies, Durham Light Infantry (Durham)
- Company Sergeant Major J. F. Davies, Worcestershire Regiment (Nord, France)
- Sergeant J. R. Davies, Machine Gun Corps (St. Albans)
- Sergeant T. Davies, Royal Welsh Fusiliers (Wrexham)
- Private T. J. Davies, Welsh Regiment (Merthyr Tydfil)
- Driver W. Davies, Royal Field Artillery (Liverpool)
- Sergeant Major H. Davoile, Royal Field Artillery (Coventry)
- Company Sergeant Major E. W. Day, Grenadier Guards (Pimlico)
- Company Sergeant Major W. A. Day, London Regiment (Highbury)
- Corporal E. S. Dennis, Nottinghamshire & Derbyshire Regiment (Nottingham)
- Sapper W. J. Dewdney, Royal Engineers (Portslade)
- Company Sergeant Major T. Dick, Tank Corps (Newcastle upon Tyne)
- Corporal J. A. Dingwall, Royal Garrison Artillery (Muswell Hill)
- Sergeant J. Dixon, Lancashire Fusiliers (Warrington)
- Private G. Doddemeade, Manchester Regiment (Bakewell)
- Sergeant T. Dolphin, Royal Field Artillery (Sheffield)
- Brigadier R. Donaldson, Royal Field Artillery (Liverpool)
- Sergeant E. Donnelly, Liverpool Regiment (Liverpool)
- Sergeant Major J. Donnelly, Highland Light Infantry (Morpeth)
- Sergeant C. Donovan, King's Own Shropshire Light Infantry (Ebbw Vale)
- Corporal F. Doughty, Royal Garrison Artillery (Cambridge)
- Corporal A. Douglas, Royal Garrison Artillery (Dundee)
- Sergeant H. E. Dowling, Royal Army Medical Corps (Manchester)
- Acting Seaman R. O. Downie RNVR (Wallsend-on-Tyne)
- Sergeant T. Downie, Labour Corps (Edinburgh)
- Sapper T. Drake, Royal Engineers (Leeds)
- Company Quartermaster Sergeant J. E. Duck, Royal Engineers (Swindon)
- Private E. Duckworth, Lab. Corps (Stockport)
- Acting Brigadier C. Duffin, Royal Field Artillery (Tilehurst)
- Company Sergeant Major W. Dunk, Royal West Kent Regiment (Dulwich)
- Sergeant Major G. Dunger, Royal Field Artillery (Regent's Park, N.W.)
- Private J. Dunn, Manchester Regiment (Bolton, Lanes.)
- Private F. Dyson, Royal Welsh Fusiliers (Reddish, Stockport)
- Battery Quartermaster Sergeant H. G. Bastes, Royal Field Artillery (Harrow Road, W.)
- Lance Corporal W. G. A. Eatwell, South Staffordshire Regiment (St. John's Wood)
- Corporal F. E. Edgington, Royal Engineers (Cassington, nr. Eynsham)
- Sergeant L. F. Edwards, Machine Gun Corps (Burton-on-Trent)
- Brigadier F. J. Egan, Royal Garrison Artillery (Dublin)
- Lance Corporal W. P. Egles, Rifle Brigade (Streatham, S.W)
- Corporal H. Element, Machine Gun Corps (Leyton)
- Private S. A. G. Elliott, Tank Corps (Wilmington)
- Staff Sergeant G. T. Elliott, Army Service Corps (Weymouth)
- Battery Sergeant Major C. Ellis, Royal Field Artillery (Sheffield)
- Company Sergeant Major H. C. Ellis, Royal Engineers (Sheffield)
- Lance Corporal H. Emery, Middlesex Regiment (Finsbury Park)
- Sergeant C. Evans, Royal Field Artillery (Walsall)
- Sergeant D. G. Evans, Royal Welsh Fusiliers (Ruthin)
- Corporal E. Evans, Royal Fusiliers (Tunstall)
- Company Sergeant Major G. E. Evans, South Staffordshire Regiment (Wolverhampton)
- Sergeant H. C. Evans, Royal Engineers (Martens)
- Private J. L. Evans, Worcestershire Regiment (Bilston)
- Private R. W. Evans, Royal Welsh Fusiliers (Wrexham)
- Sergeant T. Evans, Royal Field Artillery (Farnham)
- Sergeant Major H. J. Farley, Worcestershire Regiment (Worcester)
- Sergeant D. Farrar, Lancashire Fusiliers (Salford)
- Company Sergeant Major C. Featherstone, King's Own Yorkshire Light Infantry (Rotherham)
- Sergeant G. R. Felgate, Royal Garrison Artillery (Dovercourt)
- Sergeant G. Fenton, Royal Engineers (Glasgow)
- Corporal J. Finnie, Royal Scots (Lesmahagow)
- Temp Sergeant Major A. S. Fisher, Royal Field Artillery (Plumstead)
- Private T. Flannigan, Cameron Highlanders (Edinburgh)
- Sergeant M. Flatt, Machine Gun Corps (Bedingfield)
- Sergeant W. Fletcher, Lancashire Fusiliers (Bury)
- Sergeant W. Fletcher, Royal Field Artillery (Wolverhampton)
- Private J. Forrest, Royal Inniskilling Fusiliers (Airdrie)
- Sergeant A. Foster, Royal Highlanders (Glasgow)
- Sergeant C. B. Foster, East Surrey Regiment (S. Benfield)
- Private W. J. Foster MM Rifle Brigade (Stourport)
- Sapper J. Fowler, Royal Engineers (Huddersfield)
- Sergeant W. Fowler, Tank Field Company (Bedford)
- Brigadier W. J. Fowler, Royal Field Artillery (Polegates)
- Corporal F. Fox, Royal Engineers (Middlesboro)
- Corporal G. France, King's Own Yorkshire Light Infantry (Pontefract)
- Driver M. Frost, Royal Field Artillery (Pontypridd)
- Lance Corporal A. Froud, Gloucestershire Regiment (Swindon)
- Sergeant Major J. Fuller, Royal Field Artillery (Gorleston)
- Sergeant F. Gains, Yorkshire Regiment (Sutton)
- Sergeant A. Gamble, Royal Garrison Artillery (Melton Mowbray)
- Sergeant A. E. Gardiner, Royal Engineers (Chiswick)
- Company Sergeant Major J. Gardiner, Gordon Highlanders (Aberdeen)
- Regimental Quartermaster Sergeant H. Gentry, Essex Regiment (N. Woolwich)
- Corporal W. T. Gibbs, South Wales Borderers (Oairan Bridgend)
- Company Sergeant Major D. Gilchrist, Argyll & Sutherland Highlanders (Cardiff)
- Acting Sergeant W. Gill, Lancashire Fusiliers (Chesterfield)
- Sergeant H. Glanville, Manchester Regiment (Watford)
- Sergeant S. H. Good, Royal Field Artillery (Lee, S.E.)
- Sergeant Major M. Gordon, Royal Field Artillery (Fermoy)
- Private W. Gothard, King's Own Yorkshire Light Infantry (Sheffield)
- Corporal W. E. Grady, Royal Field Artillery (Hayling Island)
- Company Sergeant Major N. J. Graham, Loyal North Lancashire Regiment (Bolton)
- Company Sergeant Major R. Granger, Lancashire Fusiliers (Portsmouth)
- Sergeant J. Gration, London Regiment (Ripley)
- Sergeant P. Gray, Royal Field Artillery (Liverpool)
- Company Sergeant Major W. T. Gray, Northamptonshire Regiment (Thrapston)
- Sergeant A. Green, Royal Army Medical Corps (Hull)
- 2nd Corporal F. Green, Royal Engineers (Rarnsley)
- Company Sergeant Major H. Green, Royal Welsh Fusiliers (Chorley)
- Sergeant W. Grwnleaf, Royal Lancaster Regiment ([E.] Colchester)
- Sergeant S. P. Griffen, Royal Engineers (Southam)
- Brigadier E. Griffiths, Royal Field Artillery (Cradley Heath)
- Sergeant J. E. Grinham, Royal Lancaster Regiment (S. Croydon)
- Acting Brigadier C. Groves, Royal Field Artillery (Slough)
- Sergeant H. F. Gwyer, Royal Field Artillery (Coulsdon)
- Sergeant W. Hale, Royal Engineers (Parkhurston)
- Sergeant A. Hall, Lincolnshire Regiment (Lincoln)
- Sapper E. M. Hall, Royal Engineers (Stoke-on-Trent)
- Sergeant T. Halligan, Northumberland Fusiliers (Choppington)
- Sergeant J. Hamilton, Royal Irish Rifles (Carrickfergus)
- Sergeant E. F. Hammond, Royal Engineers (Teignmouth)
- Sergeant H. Hammond, Rifle Brigade (King's Lynn)
- Brigadier. H. W. Hancock, Royal Garrison Artillery (Teddington)
- Corporal A. E. Hand, Manchester Regiment (Manchester)
- Sergeant D. Hardesty, Royal Engineers (Kensington, W.)
- Corporal T. Hardman, Royal Field Artillery (Dawley)
- Gunner P. Hards, Royal Garrison Artillery (Haywards Heath)
- Company Sergeant Major W. Hargreaves, Machine Gun Corps (Bridgeton)
- Company Sergeant Major A. S. Harle, Northumberland Fusiliers (Monkseaton)
- Corporal W. J. Harper, Royal Engineers (St. Helens)
- Sergeant A. Harrington, Essex Regiment (Braintree)
- Sergeant A. Harris, Royal Scots Fusiliers (Glasgow)
- Corporal G. S. Harris, York and Lancaster Regiment (Rotherham)
- Company Quartermaster Sergeant J. Harris, Royal Engineers (Sheffield)
- Sergeant J. W. Harrison, Royal Engineers (Willesden)
- Company Sergeant Major W. E. Hartcutts, Leicestershire Regiment (Melton Mowbray)
- Lance Sergeant R. Hartley MM West Riding Regiment (Ilkley)
- Sergeant H. Harvey, Hussars (Bromley by Bow)
- Sergeant B. Hatto, London Regiment (Chelsea)
- Private J. J. Hawker, Army Service Corps (Reading)
- Sergeant W. Hawkes, Royal Field Artillery (Birmingham)
- Sergeant E. B. Hayball, Leicestershire Regiment (Willingham)
- Pioneer H. Hayes, Royal Engineers (Silksworth)
- Company Sergeant Major A. Hayler, Royal Engineers (Plumstead, S.E.)
- Company Sergeant Major W. V. Hazelwood, Middlesex Regiment (Tottenham)
- Sergeant M. Healy MM Police (Dublin)
- Private W. Heard, Army Service Corps (Launceston)
- Sergeant W. Hedges, Lancashire Fusiliers (Irlam o' th' Heights)
- Sergeant J. Hedley, Royal Field Artillery (Cambois Blyth)
- Company Sergeant Major H. Hemingway, West Yorkshire Regiment (Leeds)
- Sergeant G. Henderson, R.W. Surr. K. (Rowledge)
- Temp Sergeant Major G. H. Henderson, Royal Warwickshire Regiment (Caterham Valley)
- Sergeant J. W. Henderson, West Yorkshire Regiment (Harrogate)
- Company Sergeant Major W. Herridge, Royal Sussex Regiment (Kemp Town)
- Corporal A. Hewit, Royal Indian Artillery (Edinburgh)
- Sergeant J. R. Hey, Royal Engineers (Barnsley)
- Regimental Major A. M. Hill MC Grenadier Guards (Battersea)
- Staff Sergeant Major G. Hill, Army Service Corps (Forest Hill, S.E.)
- Private F. L. Hill, Army Service Corps (Folkestone)
- Lance Corporal A. J. Hillier, Somerset Light Infantry (Frome)
- Corporal F. T. Hills, Royal Engineers (Chelmsford)
- Sergeant H. S. Hills, Suffolk Regiment (Abbington Park, Cambridge)
- Sergeant Major H. J. Hines, Royal Garrison Artillery (Street)
- Sergeant J. Hird, Royal Field Artillery (Carlisle)
- Sergeant A. S. Hitchcock, Royal Engineers (Powderham)
- Private J. Hockley, Army Service Corps, attd. Tank Corps (Acton, W.)
- Sergeant H. Holden, South Staffordshire Regiment (Wolverhampton)
- Corporal A. E. Hollingdale, Royal Field Artillery (Bow, E.)
- Corporal A. Hollow, Royal Berkshire Regiment (High Lanes, Hoyle)
- Sergeant H. Holmes, Royal Field Artillery (Kilwinning)
- Private S. Holmes, King's Own Yorkshire Light Infantry (Fryston)
- Company Sergeant Major H. Holt, South Lancashire Regiment (Warrington)
- Battery Quartermaster Sergeant E. D. Hopkins, Royal Field Artillery (Portsmouth)
- 2nd Corporal J. H. Hopkinson, Royal Engineers (Mansfield)
- Sergeant J. Horsfield, Manchester Regiment (Ashton-under-Lyne)
- Company Sergeant Major T. Howard, Machine Gun Corps (King's Cross)
- Private C. Howarth, King's Own Yorkshire Light Infantry, attd. Trench Mortar Battery (Sheffield)
- Sergeant M. Howarth, Royal Field Artillery (Didsbury)
- Sergeant A. Hughes, Army Service Corps (Belfast)
- Company Quartermaster Sergeant J. Hughes, Royal Welsh Fusiliers (Carnarvon)
- Corporal B. Hulme, Royal Engineers (Wilmslow)
- Sergeant W. Hunt, Royal Fusiliers (Acton)
- Gunner F. Ideson, Royal Horse Artillery (Keighley)
- Sergeant H. E. lies, Welsh Regiment (Norbiton)
- Sergeant E. G. W. Ingram, Royal West Surrey Regiment (S. Norwood)
- Sergeant J. Ingham, East Lancashire Regiment (Padiham)
- Sergeant A. Isaacs, Somerset Light Infantry (Middlesboro')
- Sergeant W. H. Isherwood, Loyal North Lancashire Regiment (Bolton)
- Private E. J. Ivens, Hampshire Regiment (Skipstone-on-Stone)
- Gunner J. Jackson, Royal Field Artillery (Bamber Bridge)
- Corporal J. H. E. Jackson, Durham Light Infantry (Wolverhampton)
- Sergeant T. Jackson, East Yorkshire Regiment (Sheffield)
- Sergeant T. Jackson, Royal Garrison Artillery (Halesworth)
- Sergeant Major G. Jakeman, Royal Garrison Artillery (E. London)
- Sergeant D. G. James, Cameron Highlanders (Glasgow)
- Sergeant H. L. James, R. Guernsey Light Infantry (King's Cross, London)
- Sergeant M. James, Royal Horse Artillery, attd. Royal Field Artillery (Neath)
- Company Sergeant Major J. Jamieson, Machine Gun Corps (Belfast)
- Company Sergeant Major S. Jeffries, London Regiment (Enfield)
- Sergeant G. W. Jennings, Royal Garrison Artillery (Bristol)
- Gunner H. A. Jennings, Royal Field Artillery (Shadwell)
- Trooper C. H. A. Johnson, Yeomanry (Tyne Dock)
- Sergeant Major G. Johnson, Dragoons (Colchester)
- Sergeant T. N. Johnson, Royal Engineers (Twyford)
- Sergeant A. Jones, Lancashire Fusiliers (Manchester)
- Company Sergeant Major F. Jones, King's Own Yorkshire Light Infantry (Wakefield)
- Sergeant H. Jones MM Machine Gun Corps (Manor Park)
- Sapper W. Jones, Royal Engineers (Liverpool)
- Private W. D. Jones, Border Regiment (Manchester)
- 2nd Corporal W. Jukes, Royal Engineers (Templecombe)
- Corporal J. H. Kelsey, Royal Warwickshire Regiment (Warwick)
- Sergeant J. Kennedy, East Yorkshire Regiment (Birmingham)
- Sergeant E. Kent, Royal Field Artillery (Watford)
- Company Sergeant Major W. J. Kenton, Cheshire Regiment (W. Ham, London)
- Sergeant J. W. Kerridge, Middlesex Regiment (Kimberley, S.A.)
- Corporal H. King, Royal Engineers (Dewsbury)
- Company Sergeant Major R. Kirby, Durham Light Infantry (Darlington)
- Sergeant J. Kirk, Royal Engineers (Elderslie)
- Sergeant J. Kirkman, Machine Gun Corps (Northwick)
- Brigadier W. D. Kitchener, Royal Field Artillery (Swanley)
- Smith/Shipwright G. W. Knight, Royal Garrison Artillery (Leicester)
- Private F. Lamb, Rifle Brigade (Binstead, Ryde)
- Company Sergeant Major W. Lamb, Nottinghamshire & Derbyshire Regiment (Derby)
- Brigadier P. Lane, Royal Field Artillery (Darwen)
- Sergeant T. Lane, Hampshire Regiment (Bromley)
- Sergeant Major J. G. Langton, Royal Field Artillery (Earl's Court)
- Lance Corporal R. D. Lavender, Royal Engineers (King's Cross, London)
- Lance Corporal E. Lawrence, Military Mounted Police (Canterbury)
- Sergeant S. D. Lawrence, Royal Field Artillery (Fraserburgh)
- Lance Corporal W. J. Lawson, Royal Engineers (Hendon, Sunderland)
- Sergeant T. N. Leah, Royal Field Artillery (Liverpool)
- Acting Sergeant Major A. Lee, East Surrey Regiment (Fulharn)
- Sergeant U. J. Lee, King's Royal Rifle Corps (Greenwich)
- Sergeant Major W. F. Leeder, Royal Field Artillery (Wimbledon)
- Company Sergeant Major J. C. Lees, Royal Scots (Tranent)
- Corporal D. Lennie, Royal Engineers (Dalmuir)
- Corporal A. Lennox, Royal Engineers (Chepstow)
- Lance Corporal F. Leonard, Machine Gun Corps (Cardiff)
- Foreman of Works Staff Sergeant A. M. Letford, Establishment for Engin. Serv. (Gillingham)
- Company Quartermaster Sergeant J. Lewis, Essex Regiment (Dovercourt)
- Sergeant T. Lewis, Northumberland Fusiliers (Newcastle upon Tyne)
- Company Sergeant Major W. C. Lewis MM Wiltshire Regiment (Putney)
- Sergeant W. S. Lim, Army Service Corps (Tooting)
- Company Sergeant Major F. Lister MM King's Royal Rifle Corps (Woolwich)
- Private D. A. Little, Liverpool Regiment, attd. Light Trench Mortar Battery (Liverpool)
- Sergeant J. Logan, Machine Gun Corps (Newtonmore)
- Sergeant R. Lomax, Royal Army Medical Corps (Nelson)
- Company Sergeant Major W. J. Longley, Middlesex Regiment (Ratherhithe)
- Acting Sergeant C. Lovell, Welsh Regiment (Treforest)
- Private W. Lowe, Royal Dublin Fusiliers (Oswaldtwisitle)
- Sergeant Major J. Lowery, Royal Garrison Artillery (Newcastle upon Tyne)
- Sergeant M. McArdle, Machine Gun Corps (Castleblaney)
- Private P. McArdle, Labour Corps (Glasgow)
- Sergeant D. Macarthur, Seaforth Highlanders (Stornoway)
- Lance Corporal R. McCabe, Welsh Regiment (St. Helens)
- Corporal W. McCarthy, Royal Garrison Artillery (Cork)
- Company Sergeant Major G. McCellan, Manchester Regiment (Manchester)
- Sergeant T. McClelland, Irish Guards (Londonderry)
- Sapper W. G. McConnell, Royal Engineers (Shrewsbury)
- Corporal A. McDonald, Royal Scots (Avonbridge)
- Company Sergeant Major T. McDonald MM Manchester Regiment (Bury)
- Sergeant D. MicFarlane, King's Own Scottish Borderers (Kilsyth)
- Corporal of Horse P. A. Macintosh, Life Gds (Edinburgh)
- Sergeant T. Mackay, Royal Garrison Artillery (Dundee)
- Colonel G. McKie, Cameron Highlanders, attd. Trench Mortar Battery (Barrhill)
- Lance Corporal W. Mackie MM Gordon Highlanders (Huntly)
- Private D. McKinney, Irish Guards (Glasgow)
- Sergeant W. McLaren, Royal Engineers (Glasgow)
- Private R. D. McLean, Army Service Corps
- Corporal W. H. MacLean Royal Engineers (Glasgow)
- Private J. R. Macleod, London Regiment (Ardgay)
- Sergeant G. MacRitchie, London Regiment (Dunblane)
- Battery Quartermaster Sergeant H. A. Maddox, Royal Horse Artillery (Selby)
- Private W. C. Mallatrat; Nottinghamshire & Derbyshire Regiment (Mansfield)
- Company Sergeant Major T. W. Manktelow, London Regiment (Barnsbury Road, N.)
- Corporal T. D. Maple, Royal Garrison Artillery (Kensington Park)
- Sergeant H. T. Marie, King's Royal Rifle Corps (London, S.E.)
- Regimental Sergeant Major A. M. Marr, Northumberland Fusiliers (Glasgow)
- Sergeant Major W. Marriott, Royal Field Artillery (Alfreton)
- Sergeant Major W. Marriott, Royal Field Artillery (Downham Market)
- Sergeant W. C. Marshall, Machine Gun Corps (Lindal-in-Furness)
- Corporal G. Martin, Royal Field Artillery
- Act. Regimental Sergeant Major W. J. Mash, Rifle Brigade (Greenwich)
- Private H. Mason, Machine Gun Corps (Stockton Heath)
- Sergeant H. H. Mather, Royal Field Artillery (Eagley Bank)
- Company Sergeant Major J. Mathers, Royal Irish Rifles (Belfast)
- Company Sergeant Major W. H. Mathie, Highland Light Infantry (Glasgow)
- Sergeant H. C. Mathieson, Royal Garrison Artillery (Midlothian)
- Corporal G. Matthews, Northumberland Fusiliers (Farnham)
- Sergeant M. Mayson, Lancers (Barrow)
- Private R. Mellish, Royal Berkshire Regiment (Lambeth)
- Sergeant J. Meredith, Royal Welsh Fusiliers (Birkenhead)
- Sapper W. H. Message, Royal Engineers (Eastbourne)
- Sapper J. Millar, Royal Engineers (Kirkcaldy)
- Sergeant Major D. Miller, Royal Irish Rifles (Dillon Cross)
- Battery Quartermaster Sergeant G. Miller, Argyll & Sutherland Highlanders (Alloa)
- Sergeant F. Millward, Royal Field Artillery (Leek)
- Private G. E. Minert, East Surrey Regiment (Camberwell)
- Acting Corporal J. Mitchell Royal Scots (Glasgow)
- Private J. J. Molyneaux, Lancashire Fusiliers (Wigan)
- Sergeant P. M. Money, London Regiment (Westminster)
- Sergeant J. Moody, Royal Field Artillery (Leeds)
- Sergeant F. Moore, Leicestershire Regiment (Leicester)
- Quartermaster Sergeant J. Moore, Royal Army Medical Corps (Edinburgh)
- Company Sergeant Major J. W. Moore, Liverpool Regiment (Liverpool)
- Sergeant L. J. Moore, Machine Gun Corps (Hackness)
- Private P. Moran, Royal Dublin Fusiliers (Dublin)
- Corporal D. J. Morgan, Royal Garrison Artillery (Pontypridd)
- Sergeant W. Morgan, Labour Corps (Warington)
- Corporal J. Morrine, Royal Engineers (Dumfries)
- Lance Corporal B. Morris, North Staffordshire Regiment (Stafford)
- Acting Company Sergeant Major G. J. Morris, South Wales Borderers (Newport)
- Company Sergeant Major J. W. Morris, Royal Engineers (Bethnal Green, N.E.)
- Lance Corporal R. Morris, Loyal North Lancashire Regiment (Bolton)
- Corporal W R. Morrish MM Royal Engineers (Bristol)
- Lance Corporal W. Mounter, Royal Engineers (Clapham Common, S.W.)
- Brigadier R. Muckersie, Royal Field Artillery (Methil)
- Sapper J. Mulcahy, Royal Engineers (Cork)
- Sergeant E. Murphy, Liverpool Regiment (Liverpool)
- Sergeant L. J. Mursell, Royal Garrison Artillery (Southampton)
- Corporal J. Naylon, Seaforth Highlanders (Bolton)
- Sergeant W. Neill, Royal Irish Fusiliers (Lurgan)
- Sergeant E. G. Newman, Royal Engineers (St. Andrews)
- Sergeant Major H. Newman, Royal Field Artillery (Catford
- Sergeant R. J. Newman, Royal Fusiliers (Radlett)
- Company Sergeant Major T. J. Newton, Middlesex Regiment (Finsbury Park)
- Sergeant Major W. G. Newton, North Lancashire Regiment (Devon)
- Sergeant J. Nicholls, King's Own Yorkshire Light Infantry (Kinsley, nr. Wakefield)
- Sergeant J. Nicol, Yorkshire Regiment (Bedale)
- Private J. North, Yorkshire Regiment (Aylesbury)
- Sergeant S. A. Northrop, Royal Engineers (Walthamstow)
- Regimental Quartermaster Sergeant W. Northwood, Nottinghamshire & Derbyshire Regiment (Mapperley)
- Sergeant G. H. Norton, Hampshire Regiment (S. Moulton)
- Sergeant R. Norton, Northumberland Fusiliers (Hirst)
- Sergeant S. Nutting, South Staffordshire Regiment (Rushall)
- Sergeant J. E. Odlin, Lincolnshire Regiment (Louth)
- Acting Brigadier S. H. Oldham, Motor Machine Gun Service (Bagleyfields)
- Private R. O'Gorman, Royal Munster Fusiliers
- Sergeant W. O'Rourke, Connaught Rangers (Mullingar)
- Company Sergeant Major O. Owens, Royal Welsh Fusiliers (Leicester)
- Sergeant E. Page MM Royal Field Artillery (Plumstead, S.E.)
- Company Sergeant Major G. S. Parker, King's Own Yorkshire Light Infantry (Featherstone)
- Driver L. T. Parkin, Royal Field Artillery (Haswell)
- Corporal S. A. Parker, Royal Horse Artillery (Hove)
- Sergeant E. Parkin, Royal Engineers (Sheffield)
- Sergeant Major W. Parkin, Royal Field Artillery (Sunderland)
- Sergeant F. Parnwell, Grenadier Guards (Chiswick)
- Sergeant Major H. J. Parrott, Royal Field Artillery (Tottenham)
- Private H. Pattison, Durham Light Infantry (Spennymoor)
- Sergeant T. Pearce, Lancashire Fusiliers (Salford)
- Sergeant H. F. Peel, Army Service Corps
- Corporal L. S. Pegram, Royal Fusiliers (Enfield)
- Lance Corporal T. M. Penny Motor Machine Gun Service (Ulverstone)
- Sergeant E. Perkins, Royal Field Artillery (Sheffield)
- Acting Sergeant A. Perry, South Staffordshire Regiment, attd. Light Trench Mortar Battery (Walsall)
- Gunner C. J. Perry, Royal Field Artillery (Tulla, Co. Clare)
- Sergeant Major E. Perryman, Royal Field Artillery
- Sergeant C. R. Pettinger, Royal Engineers (Shipley)
- Sergeant G. R. Phillips, Hussars (Scarboro)
- Corporal T. W. J. Pine, Royal Engineers (Gillingham)
- Sergeant W. Poote, Royal Garrison Artillery (Skewen)
- Corporal F. W. Porter, Machine Gun Corps (Barkinside)
- Sergeant H. E. Price, Liverpool Regiment (Widnes)
- Sergeant W. Prioe, Royal Engineers (Pontefract)
- Sapper A. Pritchard, Royal Engineers (Penarth)
- Company Sergeant Major W. G. Probert, Welsh Regiment (Rhyl)
- Battery Quartermaster Sergeant P. E. Pullan, Royal Field Artillery (Otley)
- Sergeant G. Purves, Royal Scots (Edinburgh)
- Private J. E. Quigley, North Lancashire Regiment (Bolton)
- Sergeant J. Quinn, King's Own Scottish Borderers (Ratcliffe)
- Sergeant A. E. Radford, Royal Field Artillery (Nottingham)
- Lance Corporal J. Randle, West Yorkshire Regiment (Gomersal)
- Private W. Randle, Rifle Brigade (Birmingham)
- Sergeant G. F. Rawlinson, London Regiment (Paddington)
- Sergeant Major W. L. Redding, Royal Field Artillery (Bradford)
- Gunner E. J. Redfern, Royal Horse Artillery (Coventry)
- Sergeant J. Reed, Cheshire Regiment (Durham)
- Corporal W. Rennie, Royal Engineers (Liscard)
- Sergeant A. R. Ridgway, West Riding Regiment (Cardiff)
- Company Sergeant Major T. Riding, Nottinghamshire & Derbyshire Regiment (Burton-on-Trent)
- Gunner G. D. Rigg, Royal Field Artillery (Leeds)
- Private C. V. Riggs, Yeomanry, attd. Royal Engineers (Wanstead, N.E.)
- Sergeant F. C. Rising MM Royal Engineers (Norwich)
- 2nd Corporal J. Ritchie, Royal Engineers (Fraserburgh)
- Sergeant A. B. Robbins, S. Wales B'ord. (Ross)
- Sergeant F. W. Roberts, Royal Garrison Artillery (Sheffield)
- Corporal W. G. Roberts, Royal Engineers, T.F. (Smethwick)
- Sergeant E. Robinson, Lancashire Fusiliers (Salford)
- Company Sergeant Major T. Robishaw, Manchester Regiment (Oldham)
- Company Sergeant Major B. A. Rolfe, Machine Gun Corps (Barking)
- Sergeant W. S. Rook, Rifle Brigade (Clapham)
- Sergeant Major T. H. Rooke, Royal Garrison Artillery (Upper Tooting)
- Sergeant G. Roper, Labour Corps (Derby)
- Lance Corporal H. W. Ross, Royal Engineers (Edinburgh)
- Brigadier J. H. Round, Royal Field Artillery (Bolton)
- Sergeant W. C. Russell, Royal Garrison Artillery (Montrose)
- Lance Corporal H. Sadd, Royal Marines (Norwich)
- 2nd Corporal F. Sanders, Royal Engineers (Stourbridge)
- Fitter H. Schofield, Royal Field Artillery (Blackburn)
- Private J. R. Scott, Army Service Corps (Streatham)
- Corporal R. Scott, Argyll & Sutherland Highlanders (Perth)
- Sergeant D. Seddon, Royal Engineers (Bolton)
- Sergeant H. Seller, Royal Field Artillery (Bognor)
- Corporal W. Semple, Royal Garrison Artillery (Kirkintilloch)
- Private A. Shaw, Army Service Corps (Burnley)
- Sergeant C. Shaw, Royal Field Artillery (Horsforth)
- Sapper J. Shaw, Royal Engineers (Warwick Sq., S.W.)
- Sergeant E. Shepherd, Royal Field Artillery (Bolton)
- Corporal W. Shires, Royal Field Artillery (Rodley)
- Sergeant Major W. T. Shirreffs, Royal Field Artillery (Aberdeen)
- Private T. W. Sholicar, Lancashire Fusiliers (Ormskirk)
- Sergeant H. G. Sigournay, Lin. Regiment (Stratford, E.)
- Corporal A. Simons, Machine Gun Corps (St. Ives)
- Company Quartermaster Sergeant T. B. Simons, Manchester Regiment (Shepherd's Bush)
- Sergeant A. Simpson, Royal Field Artillery (Fermoy)
- Company Sergeant Major E. Simpson, Lin. Regiment (Skellingthorpe)
- Private J. Simpson,' Royal Welsh Fusiliers (Coventry)
- Company Sergeant Major H. Skinner, Manchester Regiment (Heaton Park, Manchester)
- Private C. Smith, Royal Army Medical Corps (Winchester)
- Private E. Smith, Lancashire Fusiliers (Lanes Bridge, nr. Colne)
- Sapper G. H. S. Smith, Royal Engineers (Edinburgh)
- Sergeant O. G. Smith, London Regiment (Dalston)
- Sergeant P. Smith, South Lancashire Regiment (Warrington)
- Private R. J. Smith, East Lancashire Regiment (Darwen)
- Sergeant T. Smith, Bedfordshire Regiment (St. Albans)
- Acting Sergeant Major W. E. Smith, Royal Lancaster Regiment (London)
- Sergeant R. Smyth, Royal Inniskilling Fusiliers (Carrowtrasna)
- Sergeant F. Snow, Lancashire Fusiliers (Manchester)
- Sergeant G. F. Snow, King's Royal Rifle Corps (Radford)
- Brigadier F. Sowerby, Royal Field Artillery (Darlington)
- Sergeant J. Speace, Royal Engineers (Tranent)
- Sergeant W. Sporle, Manchester Regiment (Bowes Park, London)
- Lance Corporal H. E. A. Squelch, Royal Engineers (Bromley Common)
- Lance Corporal E. G. Stagg, King's Royal Rifle Corps (Croydon)
- Sergeant F. Stevens, Royal Engineers (Wootton Bassett)
- Company Sergeant Major A. Stezaker, East Lancashire Regiment (Burnley)
- Company Sergeant Major G. C. Stirton. Tank Corps (Glasgow)
- Brigadier W. Stockdale, Royal Field Artillery (Hull)
- Private C. Storey, West Yorkshire Regiment (Leeds)
- Sergeant J. Strang, Tank Corps (Kirkintillock)
- Company Sergeant Major W. J. Stubbington, King's Royal Rifle Corps (W. Horsley)
- Sergeant C. C. Sumner, Royal Field Artillery (Coventry)
- Lance Corporal H. Sutton, Military Mounted Police (St. Helens)
- Lance Corporal G. Swain MM King's Own Yorkshire Light Infantry (Middlesbrough)
- Petty Officer H. S. Swallow RNVR (Uxborough)
- Company Sergeant Major J. C. Simnett, King's Own Yorkshire Light Infantry (Stockport)
- Sergeant Major P. A. Taber, Royal Garrison Artillery (Lydd)
- Company Sergeant Major C. B. Taggart, Royal Irish Rifles (Belfast)
- Sergeant R. Tait, Royal Engineers (Longidge, nr. Preston)
- Sergeant B. Talbot, Machine Gun Corps (Smethwick)
- Lance Bombardier E. Tarns, Royal Garrison Artillery (Longton)
- Sergeant Major J. E. Tate, Royal Field Artillery (Kidderminster)
- Lance Corporal P. Tatton, Royal Engineers (Stoke-on-Trent)
- Company Sergeant Major B. Taylor, Royal Inniskilling Fusiliers (Hayes)
- Private F. Taylor, East Lancashire Regiment (Burnley)
- Sergeant Major F. H. Taylor, Gloucestershire Regiment (Cheltenham)
- Sergeant R. Taylor, Royal Field Artillery (Oswaldtwistle)
- Sergeant A. Teague, Royal Engineers (Dudley)
- Sergeant E. Terry, South Staffordshire Regiment (Appleton)
- Corporal G. J. Thomas MM Labour Corps (Camberwell, London)
- Private W. Thomas, Machine Gun Corps (Everton)
- Company Quartermaster Sergeant J. Threadgold, King's Own Shropshire Light Infantry (Bow, London)
- Acting Sergeant W. Tidmas, Leicestershire Regiment (Leicester)
- Sergeant T. Timms, Oxfordshire & Buckinghamshire Light Infantry (Oxford)
- Sergeant G. Tivendale, Royal Highlanders (Kirkcaldy)
- Foreman of Works S. Sergeant C. S. Tonks MM Royal Engineers (Liverpool)
- Company Quartermaster Sergeant P. Topping, King's Own Shropshire Light Infantry (Lichfield)
- Sergeant Major J. R. Towler, Royal Garrison Artillery (Ulceby, R.S.O.)
- Sergeant C. G. Townroe, Machine Gun Corps (Mansfield)
- Corporal E. A. Trumper, Bedfordshire Regiment (Watford)
- Sergeant Major C. Turner, Royal Field Artillery (Manchester)
- Company Sergeant Major J. W. Tutt MM Royal Sussex Regiment (Eastbourne)
- Gunner R. Twomey, Royal Garrison Artillery (Mallow)
- Sergeant W. G. Upton MM Machine Gun Corps (Colchester)
- Lance Sergeant D. Torquhart, Royal Scots Fusiliers (Edinburgh)
- Corporal B. Vaughan, London Regiment (Goodmayes)
- Sergeant Major W. Venables, Royal Garrison Artillery (Birmingham)
- Gunner A. A. Vickers, Royal Field Artillery (Bolton)
- Sergeant A. Waddell MM Argyll & Sutherland Highlanders (Glasgow)
- Sergeant G. W. Waite, Royal Engineers (Redbourn)
- Sergeant H. W. J. Walker, Royal Fusiliers (Southwark)
- Gunner L. Walker, Royal Horse Artillery (Enfield)
- Company Sergeant Major T. Walker, Lancashire Fusiliers (Manchester)
- Lance Corporal W. Walker, Machine Gun Corps
- Company Sergeant Major G. E. Walton, Lincolnshire Regiment (Grimsby)
- Private B. Ward, Royal Munster Fusiliers (Rotherham)
- Sergeant E. Ward, Seaforth Highlanders (Scarborough)
- Company Sergeant Major R. W. Wardropper, Durham Light Infantry (Sunderland)
- Company Sergeant Major S. Waring, Machine Gun Corps (Lisburn)
- Lance Sergeant M. Watson RNVR (Wakefield)
- Sergeant R. F. Watson, Scottish Rifles (Tipton)
- Acting Sergeant M. Watts, Yeomanry (Queen Camel)
- Sergeant S. Waywell, Highland Light Infantry (Hulme)
- Company Quartermaster Sergeant E. C. Webb, West Riding Regiment (Wordsley)
- Sergeant S. Weedon MM Royal Engineers (Middlesbrough)
- Sapper F. Welbum, Royal Engineers (Leeds)
- Sergeant C. Weldon, King's Own Yorkshire Light Infantry
- Company Sergeant Major A. P. West, Lancashire Fusiliers (Weymouth)
- Sergeant E. West, Machine Gun Corps (Larkbare)
- Sergeant J. Whalley, Royal Engineers (Bradford)
- Corporal W. K. Wheatley, East Yorkshire Regiment (Durham)
- Brigadier G. Whelbourn, Royal Horse Artillery (Wragby, Lines.)
- Private C. White, Army Service Corps (Wandsworth)
- Driver T. J. White, Royal Horse Artillery (Bath)
- Sergeant W. E. White, Duke of Cornwall's Light Infantry (Penzance)
- Corporal H. Whitehead, Manchester Regiment (Oldham)
- Company Sergeant Major W. Whitehead MM Nottinghamshire & Derbyshire Regiment (Ilkeston)
- Sergeant H. Whiteley, Royal Field Artillery (Leeds)
- Company Sergeant Major E. L. Wickes, London Regiment (Denmark Hill)
- Company Sergeant Major J. Wild, Royal Engineers (S. Woodford)
- Sergeant J. W. Willans, Northumberland Fusiliers (Newcastle upon Tyne)
- Sergeant A. Willerton, Machine Gun Corps (Stalybridge)
- Sergeant A. Williams, Northumberland Fusiliers (Yeadon, nr. Leeds)
- Driver D. T. Williams, Army Service Corps (Llantrissant)
- Corporal R. A. Williams, Liverpool Regiment (Liverpool)
- Sergeant W. Williams MM Monmouthshire Regiment (Newbridge)
- Corporal T. Williamson, King's Own Scottish Borderers, attd. Trench Mortar Battery (Glasgow)
- Sergeant T. Williamson, South Lancashire Regiment (Warington)
- Regimental Quartermaster Sergeant W. A. Williamson, Leicestershire Regiment (Langley Mill)
- Private A. Wilson, Gordon Highlanders (Cullen)
- Sergeant D. B. Wilson, London Regiment (Camden Town)
- Sergeant J. Wilson, Royal Field Artillery (Sutton-in-Ashfield)
- Corporal J. Wilson, Royal Engineers (Kilmarnock)
- Sergeant R. F. Wilson, Manchester Regiment, attd. Light Trench Mortar Battery (Cheetham, Manchester)
- Sergeant C. H. Wingate, Army Service Corps (Leeds)
- Battery Sergeant Major H. E. Wingate, Royal Horse Artillery (Tenby)
- Sergeant Major F. W. Wise, Manchester Regiment (Plymouth)
- Sergeant H Wood, Gloucestershire Regiment, attd. Light Trench Mortar Battery (Gloucester)
- Sergeant Major T. A. Wood, Royal Garrison Artillery (Sligo)
- Sergeant T. H. Wood, Manchester Regiment (Runcorn)
- Corporal R. Woodard, Argyll & Sutherland Highlanders (S. Baling)
- Regimental Quartermaster Sergeant A. F. Woodham, West Yorkshire Regiment (Shepherd's Bush)
- Sergeant A. C. W. Woodhouse, Royal Marine Artillery (Southsea)
- 2nd Corporal W. J. Woodrow, Royal Engineers (U. Tooting)
- Company Quartermaster Sergeant J. Woods, Royal Inniskilling Fusiliers (Ballinamallard)
- Regimental Quartermaster Sergeant C. G. Wren, London Regiment (Battersea)
- Sergeant H. B. Wrench, King's Royal Rifle Corps (Warrington)
- Private D. Wright, Royal Irish Regiment. (New Ross)
- Sergeant W. A. Wright, North Staffordshire Regiment, attd. Light Trench Mortar Battery (Worksop)
- Sergeant W. E. Wright, Machine Gun Corps (Woolwich)
- Sergeant G. E. Yates, Royal Garrison Artillery (Jersey)
- Company Sergeant Major J. E. Young, Manchester Regiment (Hulme, Manchester)
- Sergeant W. R. Young, Royal Garrison Artillery (Greenwich)

Canadian Force

- Company Sergeant Major A. Bailie, Infantry
- Sergeant J. M. Bain, Canadian Railways Construction Corps
- Sergeant J. E. Barker, Engineers
- Sergeant G. Blake, Infantry
- Lance Corporal J. Bowley, Engineers
- Corporal B. L. Broughton, Field Artillery
- Sergeant J. D. Burnet, Garrison Artillery
- Battery Sergeant Major. F. Butler, Infantry
- Staff Sergeant S. H. Bye, Army Medical Corps
- Pioneer J. W. Chaddock, Engineers
- Regimental G.M.S. A. Champagne, Infantry
- Sergeant M. Dempsey, Infantry
- Sergeant Major A. W. Dewolf, Garrison Artillery
- Sergeant F. Douglas, Infantry
- Sergeant D. Dunbar, Infantry
- Sergeant Major J. Farr, Infantry
- Private W. C. Ferguson, Infantry
- Sergeant A. Findley MM Infantry
- Sergeant S. G. Fogg, Field Artillery
- Private S. T. Foster, Mounted Rifles
- Sergeant L. Fox, Infantry
- Sergeant Major G. H. Fry, Field Artillery
- Company Quartermaster Sergeant W. R. Garrison, Infantry O.N.
- Corporal W. Holahan, Raily. Con. Corps
- Sergeant D. R. Honeyman, Infantry
- Sergeant H. W. Hopkins, Infantry
- Battery Quartermaster Sergeant T. M. Hyman, Field Artillery
- Corporal L. D. Johnson, Engineers
- Sergeant D. C. Johnstone, Engineers
- Private H. Kift, Infantry
- Sergeant A. E. Lang, Railways Troops
- Sergeant Major G. G. Lawson, Machine Gun Corps
- Company Sergeant Major W. E. Lawson, Infantry
- Sergeant F. A. Lyons, Mounted Rifles
- Company Sergeant Major F. E. Mantle, Infantry
- 2nd Corporal W. F. Marsh, Engineers
- Company Sergeant Major H. O. Matthews, Infantry
- Sergeant Major C. E. McArthur, Army Medical Corps
- Sergeant A. R. McCue, Artillery
- Sergeant Major J. McNamara, Field Artillery
- Corporal N. McK. McRae, Infantry
- Sergeant S. G. Moore, Infantry
- Company Sergeant Major T. C. Morrison, Infantry
- Sergeant H. J. Mortimer, Field Artillery
- Company Sergeant Major J. P. Murphy, Infantry
- Corporal R. S. Murphy, Infantry
- Sergeant B. Nelson, Field Artillery
- Sergeant C. Novis, Infantry
- Sergeant W. Nye, Machine Gun Corps
- Sergeant W. Older, Mounted Rifles
- Sergeant C. Olmstead, Dragoons
- Sergeant Major J. Page, Infantry
- Sergeant Major F. A. Palmer, Field Artillery
- Private B. Pay, Infantry
- Quartermaster Sergeant R. McN. Pearson, Infantry
- Corporal S. Pearson, Cavalry
- Private H. Puddle, Machine Gun Corps
- Company Sergeant Major E. H. Rashley, Engineers
- Battery Quartermaster Sergeant J. F. Reed, Field Artillery
- Sergeant P. Rogers, Mounted Rifles
- Sergeant Major A. C. Simpson, Infantry O.N
- Corporal E. J. Simpson, Railway Construction Corps
- Sergeant F. B. Smith, Infantry
- Private F. Stevens, Infantry
- Sergeant H. C. Stone, Infantry
- Acting Sergeant J. E. Walsh, Railway Troops
- Company Sergeant Major C. Ward, Engineers
- Sergeant A. Westlake, Field Artillery
- Company Sergeant Major T. White, Infantry
- Private E. W. Winnebeck, Infantry

Australian Force

- Sergeant Major R. D. Allcroft, Field Artillery
- Gunner C. E. Anderson, Field Artillery
- Sergeant Major C. T. Ballingall
- Private W. F. Barker, Army Medical Corps
- Sergeant W. N. Berkeley, Infantry
- Private C. H. Blackmore, Infantry
- Sergeant T. H. Briggs, Field Artillery
- Sergeant G. C. Brodie, Engineers
- Private W. E. Brown, Infantry
- Sergeant L. Buchanan, Pioneers
- Gunner A. N. Burton, Field Artillery
- Sergeant R. L. Busteed, Pioneers
- Company Sergeant Major T. S. Carter, Infantry
- Sergeant E. A. Chisholm, Infantry
- Private D. Clunes, Infantry
- Company Sergeant Major R. H. Dennis, Infantry
- Sergeant Major J. H. Dunne, Infantry
- Company Sergeant Major W. Edgar, Machine Gun Corps
- Sergeant Major W. J. Ferridge, Field Artillery
- Sergeant Major A. Fitzsimmons, Field Artillery
- Private E. Gorham, Infantry
- Sergeant P. J. Graham, Field Artillery
- Sergeant A. E. Hack, Infantry
- Sergeant J. J. Hickey, Light Trench Mortar Battery
- Sergeant N. C. Hill, Infantry
- Sapper W. Hockin, Engineers
- Company Sergeant Major G. J. Horder, Pioneers
- Driver R. E. Humphreys, Army Service Corps
- Sergeant P. Jarry, Engineers
- Corporal F. D. Johnson, Infantry
- Company Sergeant Major D. C. Kilpatrick, Pioneers
- Sergeant H. C. Bang, Infantry
- Sergeant Major M. Littlewood, Infantry
- Corporal H. A. Lord, Pioneers
- Company Sergeant Major L. J. Mathias, Infantry
- Company Sergeant Major H. McCabe, Infantry
- Sergeant A. T. McLean, Light Trench Mortar Battery
- Private J. Miller, Infantry
- Sergeant S. R Murdock, Infantry
- Sergeant A. J. Murphy, Engineers
- Private J. F. Murphy, Army Medical Corps
- Corporal J. Nancarrow, Engineers
- Sergeant F. L. Partridge, Infantry
- Private S. S. Rawcliffe, Infantry
- Sergeant L. J. Savage, Infantry
- Sergeant C. A. Schwab MM Army Medical Corps
- Corporal R. J. Shippick, Infantry
- Private T. Simpson, Infantry
- Sergeant H. T. Stagg, Machine Gun Corps
- Sergeant G. Stewart, Field Artillery
- Company Sergeant Major R. Sykes, Machine Gun Corps
- Sergeant R. A. H. Taggart, Light Horse
- Company Sergeant Major H. Todd, Infantry
- Gunner (Lance Brigadier) J. R. Tulloch, Field Artillery
- Company Sergeant Major D. Walker, Infantry
- Sergeant G. E. Watkins, Infantry
- Private D. White, Machine Gun Corps
- Sergeant J. Williams, Field Artillery
- Corporal G. Wilson, Trench Mortar Battery

New Zealand Force

- Company Sergeant Major R. A. Boyd, Wellington Regiment
- Sergeant Major E. J. Conlon, Rifle Brigade
- Company Sergeant Major L. T. Daniell, Rifle Brigade
- Sergeant H. Fraser, Rifle Brigade
- Corporal W. B. Goile, Field Artillery
- Sergeant R. H. Halligan MM Canterbury Regiment
- Sergeant J. L. Hill, Auckland Regiment
- Company Sergeant Major A. McFadyen, Otago Regiment
- Lance Corporal J. MacPherson, Otago Regiment
- Sergeant Major L. G. Morrison, Field Artillery
- Corporal A. Neilson, Engineers
- Corporal A. Notton, Wellington Regiment
- Private T. R. O'Connor, Auckland Regiment
- Sergeant W. E. Randell, Auckland Regiment
- Corporal B. R. Turner, Canterbury Regiment
- Sergeant D. C. Waterson, Auckland Regiment

South African Force

- Bombardier F. Hughes, Heavy Artillery
- Sergeant A. Smith, Infantry
- Corporal W. Stuart, Infantry

Newfoundland Force

- Private T. A. Pittman MM Royal Newfoundland Regiment

In recognition of valuable services rendered with the Forces in Italy —

- Corporal W. Adams, South Staffordshire Regiment (Hanley)
- Company Sergeant Major H. Aungiers, Durham Light Infantry (Grangetown)
- Sergeant Major T. Ayers, Royal Garrison Artillery (London)
- Sergeant S. G. Bellamy, Royal Field Artillery (Taunton)
- Sergeant J. Bolt, Devonshire Regiment (N. Tawton)
- Sergeant A. Bracken, Royal Field Artillery (Bethnal Green, London)
- Sergeant W. J. Bradley, Honourable Artillery Company (Spitalfields)
- Private R. Brighten, Norfolk Regiment, attd. Trench Mortar Battery (Norwich)
- Corporal M. Brown, Military Mounted Police (Oxford)
- Sergeant W. Carter, Royal West Kent Regiment (Tonbridge)
- Corporal J. Clarke, Royal Garrison Artillery (Seacombe)
- Battery Quartermaster Sergeant R. Coldwell, Royal Field Artillery (Plaistow)
- Company Sergeant Major F. G. Collis MM Hampshire Regiment (Portsmouth)
- Fitter T. Cooper, Royal Field Artillery (Chesterfield)
- Sergeant E. K. Courtier, Gloucestershire Regiment (Bristol)
- Company Quartermaster Sergeant. E. Cox MM Royal West Surrey Regiment (Strood)
- Sergeant H. W. Creighton, Military Mounted Police (W. Kensington)
- Company Sergeant Major H. E. Cufets, Royal Warwickshire Regiment (Birmingham)
- Sergeant A. J. Davis, R. E. (Bristol)
- Gunner W. Davis, Royal Field Artillery (Petersfield)
- Sergeant R. Day, Gloucestershire Regiment (Bristol)
- Company Sergeant Major A. E. W. F. Easterbrook, Royal Engineers (Gillingham)
- Gunner T. Emerton, Royal Field Artillery (Gateshead)
- Driver S. H. Faulkner, Royal Field Artillery (Gloucester)
- Company Sergeant Major W. Fisher, South Staffordshire Regiment (Tipton)
- Lance Corporal D. R. Frame, Gordon Highlanders (Ardrossan)
- Gunner T. Frost, Royal Garrison Artillery (Stafford)
- Sergeant W. Gardner, Yorkshire Regiment (Middlesbrough)
- Acting Corporal T. Garmory, York and Lancaster Regiment (Kirkcudbright)
- Corporal M. Gaskell, Royal Garrison Artillery (E Barnsley)
- Private H. Gee, King's Own Scottish Borderers (Salford)
- Sergeant W. H. Gilbert, Royal Sussex Regiment (Rye)
- Regimental Quartermaster Sergeant. F. J. Godfrey, Duke of Cornwall's Light Infantry (Northfleet)
- Sergeant F. J. Graves, Royal Welsh Fusiliers (Birkenhead)
- Sergeant T. W. Green, Royal Field Artillery (Manchester)
- Company Sergeant Major G H. Gridley, Royal Warwickshire Regiment (Homerton)
- Sergeant Major C. W. G. Harrop, Royal Garrison Artillery (Brighton)
- Company Sergeant Major F. W. Hayes, Royal Warwickshire Regiment (Birmingham)
- Corporal W. L. Haywood, Machine Gun Corps (Haringay)
- Lance Corporal J. I. Hooson, Machine Gun Corps (Mt. Tabor)
- Sergeant E. J. Hurst MM Royal Engineers (Brighton)
- Sergeant A. James, Gloucestershire Regiment (Bristol)
- Sergeant H. C. Johnson, Royal Field Artillery (Bournemouth)
- Sergeant W. Johnson, Northumberland Fusiliers (Gateshead)
- Sergeant J. P. Kelly, Yorkshire Regiment (Washington Station)
- Corporal A. F. Laffling, Royal West Kent Regiment (Hoo-in-Avochester)
- Company Sergeant Major C. Loveday, Oxfordshire & Buckinghamshire Light Infantry (Plumstead, S.E.)
- Private J. McCartney, Machine Gun Corps (Parkhead)
- Sergeant S. Mallinson, Royal Field Artillery (Whitehaven)
- Company Sergeant Major S. G. Merrick, Royal Warwickshire Regiment (Birmingham)
- Sergeant S. A. Miles, Royal Garrison Artillery (Dover)
- Company Sergeant Major A. Mills, Manchester Regiment (Oldham)
- Corporal A. Mitchrier, Royal Warwickshire Regiment (Kenilworth)
- Company Sergeant Major H. Morgan, East Surrey Regiment (Fulham, S.W.)
- Company Quartermaster Sergeant A. J. Morshead, Devonshire Regiment (Tufnell Park, London, N.)
- Act Corporal H. Mucklow, Royal Warwickshire Regiment (Birmingham)
- Corporal A. E. Nabbs, Royal Field Artillery (Pontygwaith)
- Private W. Neilson, Northumberland Fusiliers, attd. Trench Mortar Battery (Bradford)
- Corporal H. S. Nickols, Royal Warwickshire Regiment (Dawlish)
- Sergeant Major T. J. O'Driscoll, Royal Field Artillery (Cork)
- Company Sergeant Major F. Pattison, West Riding Regiment (Stocksfield-on-Tyne)
- Private J. H. Pearson, Royal Welsh Fusiliers (Brierley Hill)
- Sergeant W. J. R. Pook, Royal Field Artillery (Bristol)
- Sergeant G. A. Rae, Royal Field Artillery (W. Haftlepool)
- 2nd Corporal A. H. Reid, Royal Engineers (Wimbledon)
- Gunner E. Rolfe, Royal Garrison Artillery (Cippenham)
- Driver Rolfe, Royal Field Artillery (Beaconsfield)
- Sergeant F. Round, Royal Warwickshire Regiment (Warwick)
- Private H. Rushby, Machine Gun Corps (Sutton-on-Trent)
- Sergeant G. Salvage, Royal Garrison Artillery (Lewes)
- Sergeant W. Stevens, Royal Garrison Artillery (Woolwich)
- Temp Sergeant Major J. A. Stewart, Manchester Regiment (Manchester)
- Sergeant Major G. H. Stonock, Royal Garrison Artillery (E. Fakenham)
- Gunner J. Taylor, Royal Garrison Artillery (Longton)
- Company Sergeant Major S. Teddar, Royal West Surrey Regiment (Chobham)
- Private S. Thomas, Devonshire Regiment (Plymouth)
- Driver J. Thompson, Royal Field Artillery (Fulford)
- Sergeant T. Vincent, Cavalry (W. Baling)
- Sergeant E. A. Wellington, Royal Fusiliers (Warrington)
- Sergeant A. Wanklin, Worcestershire Regiment (Bromsgrove)
- Sergeant J. Wardman MM West Riding Regiment (nr. Keighley)
- Sergeant I. Warner, Machine Gun Corps (Birmingham)
- Sergeant B. Washington, Bedfordshire Regiment (Rickmansworth)
- Company Sergeant Major J. Welsh, York and Lancaster Regiment (Edinburgh)
- Corporal F. Williams, Army Corps of Clerks (Newport, Isle of Wight)
- Sergeant T. Woods, York and Lancaster Regiment (St. Helens)

For distinguished services in connection with Military Operations with the British Forces in Salonika —

- Regimental Sergeant Major A. W. Andrews, East Kent Regiment (Upchurch, near Sittingbourne)
- Regimental Sergeant Major E. E. W. Baker, East Surrey Regiment (Stockwell, London)
- Sergeant J. W. Bennett, Royal Field Artillery (Edmonton, N.)
- Lance Sergeant T. A. Burke, Wiltshire Regiment (Paddington)
- Private C. Carmichael, Royal Highlanders (Tighnabruaich)
- Company Sergeant Major F. Challen, Border Regiment (Woolwich)
- Regimental Sergeant Major D. C. Christie, Royal Highlanders (Dundee)
- Staff Sergeant B. Cockburn, Royal Army Medical Corps (Southampton)
- Private A. Davidson, Cameron Highlanders (Tomalin)
- Sergeant A. Edley, York and Lancaster Regiment (Sheffield)
- Regimental Sergeant Major G. Edwards, Royal Scots (Holywood, Co. Down)
- Company Sergeant Major J. Fernie, Argyll and Sutherland Highlanders (Falkirk)
- Company Sergeant Major W. Flynn, South Lancashire Regiment (Wigan)
- Regimental Sergeant Major A. P. Gough, Cheshire Regiment (Runcorn, Cheshire)
- Sergeant G. Grant, Cheshire Regiment (Elkington, South Louth)
- Driver J. A. Graves, Royal Field Artillery (Hemingbrough, Howden)
- Regimental Sergeant Major G. F. Healy, Royal Fusiliers (Chertsey)
- Sergeant J. Johnson MM Cameron Highlanders (Lochcarnan South Dist.)
- Lance Captain I. Mclntosh, Argyll and Sutherland Highlanders (Paisley)
- Captain W. McMillan, Royal Scots (Bathgate)
- Sergeant J. Markham, Royal Garrison Artillery (Brighton)
- Sergeant S. J. Martin, Royal Garrison Artillery (Delgany)
- Company Sergeant Major W. J. Martin, South Wales Borderers (Newport, Mon.)
- Captain E. Milne, Cameron Highlanders (Larkhall)
- Squadron Sergeant Major O. C. Packer, Yeomanry (Dulwich, S.S.)
- Sergeant J. Pearson, Cheshire Regiment (Stockport)
- Company Sergeant Major J. Petrie, Argyll and Sutherland Highlanders (St. Andrews)
- Company Sergeant Major Arthur John Seymour Piddington, Duke of Cornwall's Light Infantry (Aston, Rowant)
- Company Sergeant Major H. Potter, Liverpool Regiment (Bolton)
- Sergeant A. J. Ross, Oxfordshire and Buckinghamshire Light Infantry (Stony Stratford)
- Sergeant G. Smith, Lancashire Fusiliers (Morton, near Manchester)
- Sergeant T. Wooldridge, Military Mounted Police (Sandhurst, Berks.)

==== Awarded a Bar to the Distinguished Conduct Medal (DCM*) ====
For distinguished service in connection with Military Operations with the Armies in France and Flanders —

- Private H. Blackmore DCM Hussars (S. Africa)
- Company Sergeant Major W. Fisher DCM West Riding Regiment (Huddersfield)
- Company Sergeant Major C. L. Ives DCM London Regiment (Norwich)
- Acting Sergeant Major A. Lee, East Surrey Regiment (Fulham)
- Company Sergeant Major J. Malia DCM Border Regiment (Chesterfield)
- Company Sergeant Major E. Oldridge, Durham Light Infantry (Darlington)
- Sergeant J. Parke DCM MM Norfolk Regiment (E. Harling)
- Sergeant J. Pearson DCM South Wales Borderers (U. Parkstone)
- Company Sergeant Major H. Schofield DCM West Riding Regiment (Huddersfield)
- Sergeant Major W. T. Shireeffs DCM Royal Field Artillery (Aberdeen)
- Sergeant E. Spalding DCM Suffolk Regiment (Hengrave)
- Sergeant Major H. F. Spratley DCM Royal Garrison Artillery (Paddington)
- Sergeant E. W. Surplice DCM Royal Engineers (Birmingham)
- Sergeant J. Tugby DCM Machine Gun Corps (South Shields)
- Sergeant G. T. Vernon DCM Royal Field Artillery (Liverpool)
