= Ohio's 18th congressional district =

Defunct U.S. Congress electoral division

Coordinates: 40°00′N 81°50′W

- Obsolete district
- Created: 1830
- Eliminated: 2010
- Years active: 1813-2013

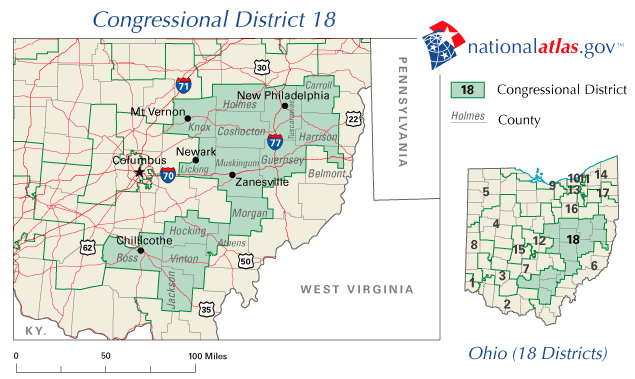
The district from 2003 to 2013

The 18th congressional district of Ohio is an obsolete congressional district last represented by Republican Bob Gibbs. The district voted for the majority party in the House of Representatives in every election since 1954.

After the 2010 census, Ohio lost two congressional seats, and the 18th district became obsolete after the 2012 elections. The territory of the 18th district was divided and placed into several other Ohio districts. A large portion of this district, including Congressman Gibbs' home in Holmes County, became part of the new 7th district in 2013. William McKinley also represented this district from March 4, 1883 till May 27, 1884.

== List of members representing the district ==
Member	Party	Years	Cong ress	Electoral history
District established March 4, 1833
Benjamin Jones (Wooster)	Jacksonian	March 4, 1833 – March 3, 1837	23rd 24th	Elected in 1832. Re-elected in 1834. [data missing]
Matthias Shepler (Bethlehem)	Democratic	March 4, 1837 – March 3, 1839	25th	Elected in 1836. [data missing]
David A. Starkweather (Canton)	Democratic	March 4, 1839 – March 3, 1841	26th	Elected in 1838. [data missing]
Ezra Dean (Wooster)	Democratic	March 4, 1841 – March 3, 1845	27th 28th	Elected in 1840. Re-elected in 1843. [data missing]
David A. Starkweather (Canton)	Democratic	March 4, 1845 – March 3, 1847	29th	Elected in 1844. [data missing]
Samuel Lahm (Canton)	Democratic	March 4, 1847 – March 3, 1849	30th	Elected in 1846. [data missing]
David K. Cartter (Massillon)	Democratic	March 4, 1849 – March 3, 1853	31st 32nd	Elected in 1848. Re-elected in 1850. [data missing]
George Bliss (Akron)	Democratic	March 4, 1853 – March 3, 1855	33rd	Elected in 1852. [data missing]
Benjamin F. Leiter (Canton)	Anti-Nebraska	March 4, 1855 – March 3, 1859	34th 35th	Elected in 1854. Re-elected in 1856. [data missing]
Sidney Edgerton (Tallmadge)	Republican	March 4, 1859 – March 3, 1863	36th 37th	Elected in 1858. Re-elected in 1860. [data missing]
Rufus P. Spalding (Cleveland)	Republican	March 4, 1863 – March 3, 1869	38th 39th 40th	Elected in 1862. Re-elected in 1864. Re-elected in 1866. [data missing]
William H. Upson (Akron)	Republican	March 4, 1869 – March 3, 1873	41st 42nd	Elected in 1868. Re-elected in 1870. [data missing]
James Monroe (Oberlin)	Republican	March 4, 1873 – March 3, 1879	43rd 44th 45th	Redistricted from the 14th district and re-elected in 1872. Re-elected in 1874. Re-elected in 1876. Redistricted to the 17th district.
Jonathan T. Updegraff (Mount Pleasant)	Republican	March 4, 1879 – March 3, 1881	46th	Elected in 1878. Redistricted to the 16th district.
Addison S. McClure (Wooster)	Republican	March 4, 1881 – March 3, 1883	47th	Elected in 1880. [data missing]
William McKinley (Canton)	Republican	March 4, 1883 – May 27, 1884	48th	Elected in 1882, but lost contested election.
Jonathan H. Wallace (New Lisbon)	Democratic	May 27, 1884 – March 3, 1885	48th	Won contested election. [data missing]
Isaac H. Taylor (Carrollton)	Republican	March 4, 1885 – March 3, 1887	49th	Elected in 1884. [data missing]
William McKinley (Canton)	Republican	March 4, 1887 – March 3, 1891	50th 51st	Redistricted from the 20th district and re-elected in 1886. Re-elected in 1888. [data missing]
Joseph D. Taylor (Cambridge)	Republican	March 4, 1891 – March 3, 1893	52nd	Redistricted from the 17th district and re-elected in 1890. [data missing]
George P. Ikirt (East Liverpool)	Democratic	March 4, 1893 – March 3, 1895	53rd	Elected in 1892. [data missing]
Robert W. Tayler (Lisbon)	Republican	March 4, 1895 – March 3, 1903	54th 55th 56th 57th	Elected in 1894. Re-elected in 1896. Re-elected in 1898. Re-elected in 1900. [data missing]
James Kennedy (Youngstown)	Republican	March 4, 1903 – March 3, 1911	58th 59th 60th 61st	Elected in 1902. Re-elected in 1904. Re-elected in 1906. Re-elected in 1908. [data missing]
John J. Whitacre (Canton)	Democratic	March 4, 1911 – March 3, 1915	62nd 63rd	Elected in 1910. Re-elected in 1912. [data missing]
David Hollingsworth (Cadiz)	Republican	March 4, 1915 – March 3, 1919	64th 65th	Elected in 1914. Re-elected in 1916. [data missing]
B. Frank Murphy (Steubenville)	Republican	March 4, 1919 – March 3, 1933	66th 67th 68th 69th 70th 71st 72nd	Elected in 1918. Re-elected in 1920. Re-elected in 1922. Re-elected in 1924. Re-elected in 1926. Re-elected in 1928. Re-elected in 1930. Lost re-election.
Lawrence E. Imhoff (St. Clairsville)	Democratic	March 4, 1933 – January 3, 1939	73rd 74th 75th	Elected in 1932. Re-elected in 1934. Re-elected in 1936. Lost re-election.
Earl Ramage Lewis (St. Clairsville)	Republican	January 3, 1939 – January 3, 1941	76th	Elected in 1938. Lost re-election.
Lawrence E. Imhoff (St. Clairsville)	Democratic	January 3, 1941 – January 3, 1943	77th	Elected in 1940. Lost re-election.
Earl R. Lewis (St. Clairsville)	Republican	January 3, 1943 – January 3, 1949	78th 79th 80th	Elected in 1942. Re-elected in 1944. Re-elected in 1946. Lost re-election.
Wayne Hays (Flushing)	Democratic	January 3, 1949 – September 1, 1976	81st 82nd 83rd 84th 85th 86th 87th 88th 89th 90th 91st 92nd 93rd 94th	Elected in 1948. Re-elected in 1950. Re-elected in 1952. Re-elected in 1954. Re-elected in 1956. Re-elected in 1958. Re-elected in 1960. Re-elected in 1962. Re-elected in 1964. Re-elected in 1966. Re-elected in 1968. Re-elected in 1970. Re-elected in 1972. Re-elected in 1974. Resigned.
Vacant		September 1, 1976 – January 3, 1977	94th	
Douglas Applegate (Steubenville)	Democratic	January 3, 1977 – January 3, 1995	95th 96th 97th 98th 99th 100th 101st 102nd 103rd	Elected in 1976. Re-elected in 1978. Re-elected in 1980. Re-elected in 1982. Re-elected in 1984. Re-elected in 1986. Re-elected in 1988. Re-elected in 1990. Re-elected in 1992. Retired.
Bob Ney (Heath)	Republican	January 3, 1995 – November 3, 2006	104th 105th 106th 107th 108th 109th	Elected in 1994. Re-elected in 1996. Re-elected in 1998. Re-elected in 2000. Re-elected in 2002. Re-elected in 2004. Resigned.
Vacant		November 3, 2006 – January 3, 2007	109th	
Zack Space (Dover)	Democratic	January 3, 2007 – January 3, 2011	110th 111th	Elected in 2006. Re-elected in 2008. Lost re-election.
Bob Gibbs (Lakeville)	Republican	January 3, 2011 – January 3, 2013	112th	Elected in 2010. Redistricted to the 7th district.
District dissolved January 3, 2013

== Election results ==
The following chart shows historic election results. Bold type indicates victor. Italic type indicates incumbent.

Year	Democratic candidate	Republican candidate	Other candidate(s)
1832	**Benjamin Jones** : 3,037	[ none ]	Samuel Quinby: 2,379
1834	**Benjamin Jones** : 2,746	[ none ]	Samuel Quinby (Whig) : 2,550
1836	**Matthias Shepler** : 4,384	[ none ]	Samuel Quinby (Whig) : 3,325
1838	**David A. Starkweather** : 6,154	[ none ]	Hiram B. Wellman (Whig) : 4,010
1840	**Ezra Dean** : 6,508	[ none ]	Levi Cox (Whig) : 5,399
1842	**Ezra Dean** : 3,529	[ none ]	George Wellhouse (Whig) : 1,517; John McDowell : 99
1844	**David A. Starkweather** : 6,981	[ none ]	John Augustine (Whig) : 5,449; Arvine Wales : 162
1846	**Samuel Lahm** : 4,651	[ none ]	David A. Starkweather (Whig) : 4,530; James Irvin : 116
1848	**David K. Cartter** : 6,682	[ none ]	Samuel Hemphill (Whig) : 4,448
1850	**David K. Cartter** : 5,754	[ none ]	John Brown (Whig) : 3,447
1852	**George Bliss** : 6,140	[ none ]	Darius Lyman (Whig) : 5,307; Thomas Earl : 1,708; Lucius V. Bierce : 446
1854	Ebenezer Spalding : 5,053	**Benjamin F. Leiter** : 8,738	[ none ]
1856	Samuel Lahm : 6,794	**Benjamin F. Leiter** : 9,394	[ none ]
1858	J. L. Ranney : 7,162	**Sidney Edgerton** : 8,184	[ none ]
1860	David A. Starkweather : 6,956	**Sidney Edgerton** : 9,720	[ none ]
1862	David R. Paige, Sr. : 4,183	**Rufus P. Spalding** : 9,293	[ none ]
1864	Jeptha H. Wade : 6,661	**Rufus P. Spalding** : 14,472	[ none ]
1866	Oliver H. Payne : 7,974	**Rufus P. Spalding** : 14,479	[ none ]
1868	Franklin T. Backus : 11,980	**William H. Upson** : 18,359	[ none ]
1870	John M. Coffinberry : 6,695	**William H. Upson** : 11,053	John D. Taylor : 448
1872	Norton S. Townshend : 10,298	**James Monroe** : 14,662	G. W. McNeil : 67
1874	John K. McBride : 10,095	**James Monroe** : 12,229	H. F. Miller : 105
1876	John J. Hall : 12,772	**James Monroe** : 16,906	S. H. McCollister : 52
1878	Daniel T. Lawson : 12,593	**Jonathan T. Updegraff** : 15,320	George Smith : 2,231; David P. Lawson : 90; William M. Grimes : 37
1880	David I. Wadsworth : 13,474	**Addison S. McClure** : 18,570	Peter J. Rice : 310; Ferdinand Schumacher : 205
1882	Jonathan H. Wallace : 16,898	**William McKinley** : 16,906	Lemuel T. Foster : 976; James A. Brush : 261
1884	Jonathan H. Wallace : 16,309	**Isaac H. Taylor** : 22,459	Charles Jenkins : 907; Albert R. Silver : 106; W. M. Cope : 82
1886	Wallace H. Phelps : 16,217	**William McKinley** : 18,776	Isaiah S. Hahn : 1,853; Charles Jenkins : 1,419
1888	George P. Ikirt : 21,150	**William McKinley** : 25,249	Lambelis P. Logan : 1,498; George W. Thornburg : 331; Isaiah Little : 38
1890	Henry H. McFadden : 11,783	**Joseph D. Taylor** : 16,993	S. W. Wilkins : 1,568
1892	**George P. Ikirt** : 22,600	Thomas R. Morgan : 21,389	Matthew B. Shay : 1,682; John W. Northrup : 1,218
1894	Edward S. Raff : 11,051	**Robert W. Tayler** : 20,830	Jacob S. Coxey, Sr. (Pop) : 8,912; Enos H. Brosius : 1,679
1896	Isaac R. Sherwood : 24,770	**Robert W. Tayler** : 29,814	James L. Swan : 476
1898	Charles C. Weybrecht : 19,575	**Robert Walker Tayler** : 22,635	George C. Harvey (Pro) : 614; Samuel Borton (Soc Lab) : 686; L. B. Logan (Union Reform) : 212
1900	John H. Morris : 25,026	**Robert Walker Tayler** : 31,479	Alvin C. Van Dyke (Union Reform) : 138; Charles F. Bough (Proh) : 909; Henry O. Bucklin (Soc Lab) : 143
1902	William J. Foley : 16,472	**James Kennedy** : 22,461	Thomas J. Duffy : 7,923; Enos H. Brosius : 886
1904	W. J. Foley : 16,472	**James Kennedy** : 36,939	Daniel J. Smith (Pro) : 1,861; John T. Jenkins (Socialist) : 2,522
1906	John C. Welty : 17,840	**James Kennedy** : 19,684	Leslie Hawk : 1,299; John Evans : 932
1908	John J. Whitacre : 29,040	**James Kennedy** : 32,287	Robert J. Wheeler (Socialist) : 2,551; Elias Jenkins (Pro) : 2,998
1910	**John J. Whitacre** : 23,568	James Kennedy : 20,617	Thomas Williams : 4,907; Elias Jenkins : 1,462
1912	**John J. Whitacre** : 23,936	Roscoe C. McCulloch : 23,350	George F. Lelansky : 7,617
1914	William S. King : 22,476	**David Hollingsworth : 23,650**	Fred White : 2,936; V. A. Schreiber : 1,341; W. K. Weaver : 1,076
1916	William B. Francis : 24,538	**David Hollingsworth : 26,991**	Robert Carson : 2,621
1918	William B. Francis : 20,272	**B. Frank Murphy : 22,899**	[ none ]
1920	Albert O. Barnes: 32,802	**B. Frank Murphy**: 52,862	[ none ]
1922	Marion Huffman: 25,449	**B. Frank Murphy**: 41,572	Jacob S. Coxey Sr.: 5,907
1924	James M. Barton: 26,656	**B. Frank Murphy**: 56,206	Charles Coleman: 1,931
1926	John F. Nolan: 19,341	**B. Frank Murphy**: 36,599	[ none ]
1928	John J. Whitacre: 31,422	**B. Frank Murphy**: 71,378	Frank Sepech (W): 317; Jacob S. Coxey Sr. (S): 2
1930	Emerson Campbell: 30,815	**B. Frank Murphy**: 47,096	[ none ]
1932	Lawrence E. Imhoff: 56,562	B. Frank Murphy: 56,010	[ none ]
1934	**Lawrence E. Imhoff**: 49,160	B. Frank Murphy: 39,642	[ none ]
1936	**Lawrence E. Imhoff**: 83,052	Earl R. Lewis: 54,119	[ none ]
1938	Lawrence E. Imhoff: 55,809	Earl R. Lewis: 56,468	[ none ]
1940	Lawrence E. Imhoff: 79,718	Earl R. Lewis: 66,666	[ none ]
1942	Lawrence E. Imhoff: 37,951	Earl R. Lewis: 43,279	[ none ]
1944	Ross Michener: 63,098	**Earl R. Lewis**: 65,847	[ none ]
1946	Eugene A. Blum: 38,606	**Earl R. Lewis**: 55,140	[ none ]
1948	Wayne Hays: 65,475	Earl R. Lewis: 55,455	[ none ]
1950	**Wayne Hays**: 58,295	Robert L. Quinn: 56,508	[ none ]
1952	**Wayne Hays**: 78,277	Clarence L. Wetzel: 62,081	[ none ]
1954	**Wayne Hays**: 59,165	Walter J. Hunston: 44,143	[ none ]
1956	**Wayne Hays**: 78,962	Joseph Miller: 53,627	[ none ]
1958	**Wayne Hays**: 88,813	Francis Wallace: 35,322	[ none ]
1960	**Wayne Hays**: 96,474	Walter J. Hunston: 50,698	[ none ]
1962	**Wayne Hays**: 66,327	John J. Carrigg: 42,336	[ none ]
1964	**Wayne Hays**: 94,768	Allen J. Dalrymple: 42,960	[ none ]
1966	**Wayne Hays**: 73,657	William H. Weir: 41,165	[ none ]
1968	**Wayne Hays**: 96,711	James F. Sutherland: 63,747	[ none ]
1970	**Wayne Hays**: 82,071	Robert Stewart: 38,104	[ none ]
1972	**Wayne Hays**: 128,663	Robert Stewart: 54,572	[ none ]
1974	**Wayne Hays**: 90,447	Ralph H. Romig: 47,385	[ none ]
1976	**Douglas Applegate***: 116,901	Ralph R. McCoy: 45,735	William Crabbe: 21,537; John Dwight Bashline: 1,661
1978	**Douglas Applegate**: 71,894	William J. Ress: 48,931	[ none ]
1980	**Douglas Applegate**: 134,835	Gary L. Hammersley: 42,354	[ none ]
1982	**Douglas Applegate**: 128,665	[ none ]	[ none ]
1984	**Douglas Applegate**: 155,759	Kenneth P. Burt Jr.: 49,356	[ none ]
1986	**Douglas Applegate**: 126,526	[ none ]	[ none ]
1988	**Douglas Applegate**: 151,306	William C. Abraham: 43,628	[ none ]
1990	**Douglas Applegate**: 120,782	John A. Hales: 41,823	[ none ]
1992	**Douglas Applegate**: 166,189	Bill Ress: 77,229	[ none ]
1994	Gregory L. DiDonato: 87,926	Bob Ney: 103,115	[ none ]
1996	Robert L. Burch Jr.: 108,332	**Bob Ney**: 117,365	Margaret Chitti (N): 8,146
1998	Robert L. Burch Jr.: 74,571	**Bob Ney**: 113,119	[ none ]
2000	Marc D. Guthrie: 79,232	**Bob Ney**: 152,325	John R. Bargar Sr. (L): 4,948
2002	[ none ]	**Bob Ney**: 125,546	[ none ]
2004	Brian R. Thomas: 88,560	**Bob Ney**: 173,499	[ none ]
2006	Zack Space: 119,494	Joy Padgett: 74,475	[ none ]
2008	**Zack Space**: 154,396	Fred L. Dailey: 103,681	[ none ]
2010	Zack Space: 80,756	Bob Gibbs: 107,426	Lindsey Sutton: 11,244

=== 2006 election ===
Padgett had won a special primary held on September 14, 2006. The rest of the Republican primary field included Holmes County Commissioner Ray Feikert; Jerry Firman of Coshocton; James Brodbelt Harris of Muskingum County; and Ralph Applegate of Columbus. When he announced his withdrawal from the race, Ney identified Padgett as his favored successor. Two other Republican candidates, Dover mayor Richard Homrighausen and Ney aide John Bennett, withdrew from the race. Candidate Greg Zelenitz was rejected by the Tuscarawas County Board of Elections.
