= Krider =

Krider may refer to:

== People ==
- John Krider (1813–1886), American gunsmith and ornithologist
- Peter L. Krider (1821–1895), American silversmith
- Samuel Krider (1811–1892), American politician from Ohio

== Other ==
- Krider Performing Arts Center, auditorium in Henry County, Tennessee
- Krider, Nebraska

== See also ==
- Kreider
