= Congressman Jones =

Congressman Jones may refer to:

- Benjamin Jones (congressman)
- James R. Jones
- Mondaire Jones
- Walter B. Jones Jr.
- Walter B. Jones Sr.
