= Senator Morse (disambiguation) =

Wayne Morse (1900–1974) was a U.S. Senator from Oregon from 1945 to 1969. Senator Morse may also refer to:

- Allen B. Morse (1837–1921), Michigan State Senate
- Chuck Morse (born 1960), New Hampshire State Senate
- Elmer D. Morse (1844–1921), Wisconsin State Senate
- Frank Morse (Oregon politician) (fl. 1970s–2010s), Oregon State Senate
- Isaac E. Morse (1809–1866), Louisiana State Senate
- John F. Morse (1801–1884), Ohio State Senate
- John Morse (Colorado politician) (born 1954), Colorado State Senate
- Stanford Morse (1926–2002), Mississippi State Senate
- Steven Morse (politician) (born 1957), Minnesota State Senate
