= Senator Cadwell =

Senator Cadwell may refer to:

- Darius Cadwell (1821–1905), Ohio state senator (1858–1860)
- George Cadwell (1773–1826), Illinois state senator (1818–1824)
