= George P. Ikirt =

American politician

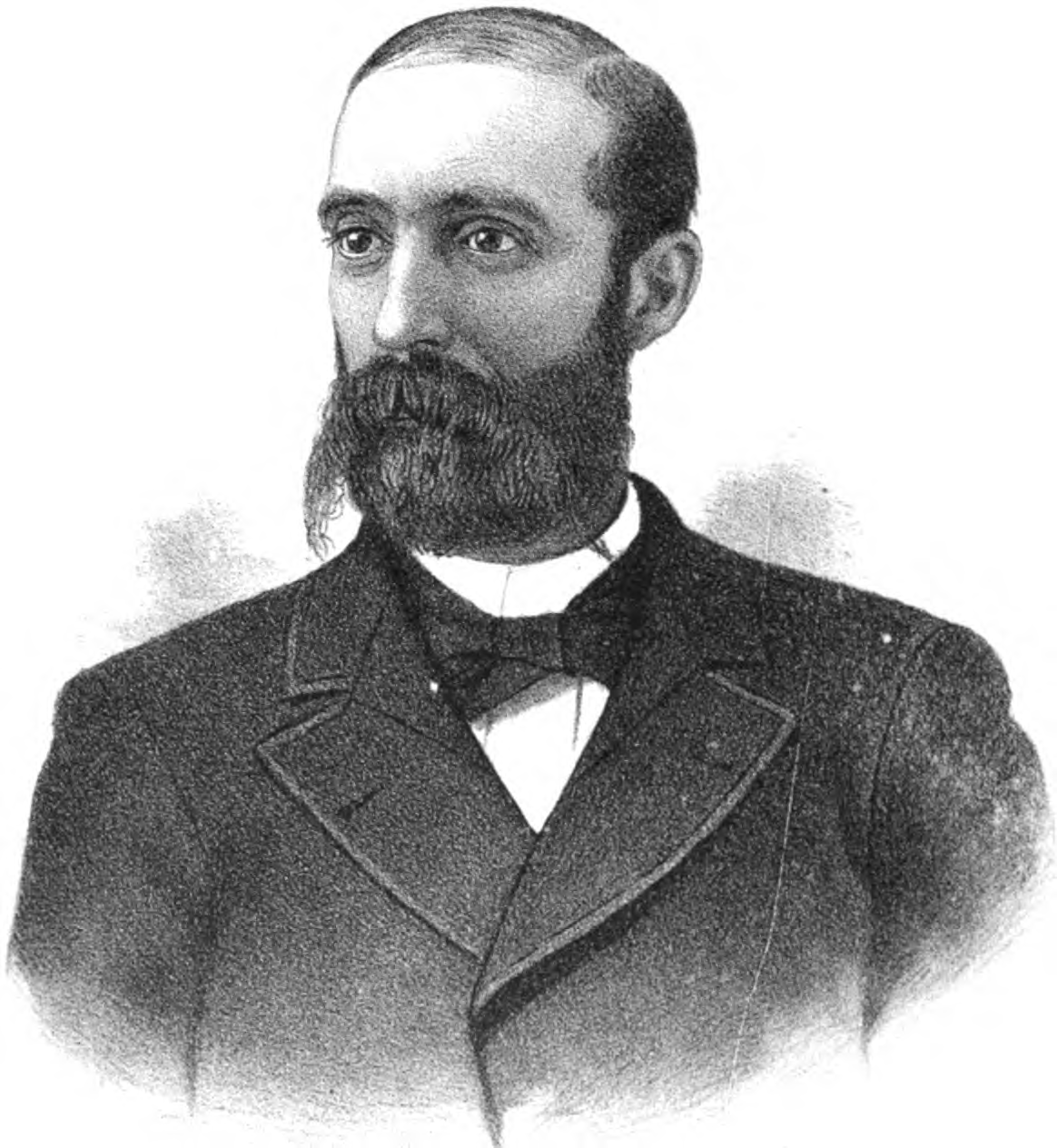

Member of the U.S. House of Representatives from Ohio's 18th district
- In office March 4, 1893 – March 3, 1895
- Preceded by: Joseph D. Taylor
- Succeeded by: Robert W. Tayler

Personal details
- Born: George Pierce Ikirt; November 3, 1852 Gavers, Ohio, U.S.
- Died: February 12, 1927 (aged 74) East Liverpool, Ohio, U.S.
- Resting place: Riverview Cemetery
- Party: Democratic
- Spouse(s): Mary L. Hasson; Mary E. Holmes
- Children: six
- Education: Columbus Medical College

George Pierce Ikirt (November 3, 1852 – February 12, 1927) was an American physician and politician who served one term as a United States representative from Ohio from 1893 to 1895.

== Early life and education ==
He was born near West Beaver (southeast of Gavers in Wayne Township) in Columbiana County, Ohio. He attended the public schools of New Lisbon, Ohio. He taught school and studied law, but on account of ill health was compelled to abandon both.

== Career ==
He later attended Columbus Medical College, moved to Cincinnati, and graduated from the Cincinnati College of Medicine and Surgery in 1877. He practiced for five years. He later went to New York City in 1882 and was graduated from the Bellevue Hospital Medical College in 1883. He then again resumed practice in East Liverpool, Ohio.

=== Congress ===
Ikirt was an unsuccessful candidate for election in 1888 to the Fifty-first Congress. He was elected as a Democrat to the Fifty-third Congress (March 4, 1893 – March 3, 1895). He declined to be a candidate for renomination in 1894.

=== Later career and death ===
He resumed the practice of medicine in East Liverpool, Ohio, and died there. He is buried in Riverview Cemetery.

== Family life ==
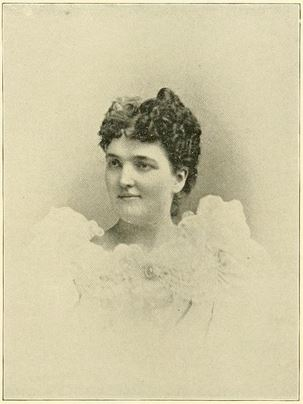
Mary E. Holmes

He was married to Mary L. Hasson in 1873. She died in 1876, leaving a son, Frank H. Ikirt. He married Mary E. Holmes in 1880. She had five children.

U.S. House of Representatives
Preceded by Joseph D. Taylor	Member of the U.S. House of Representatives from Ohio's 18th congressional district 1893-1895	Succeeded by Robert W. Tayler
