= Benjamin F. Leiter =

American politician (1813–1866)

Benjamin Franklin Leiter
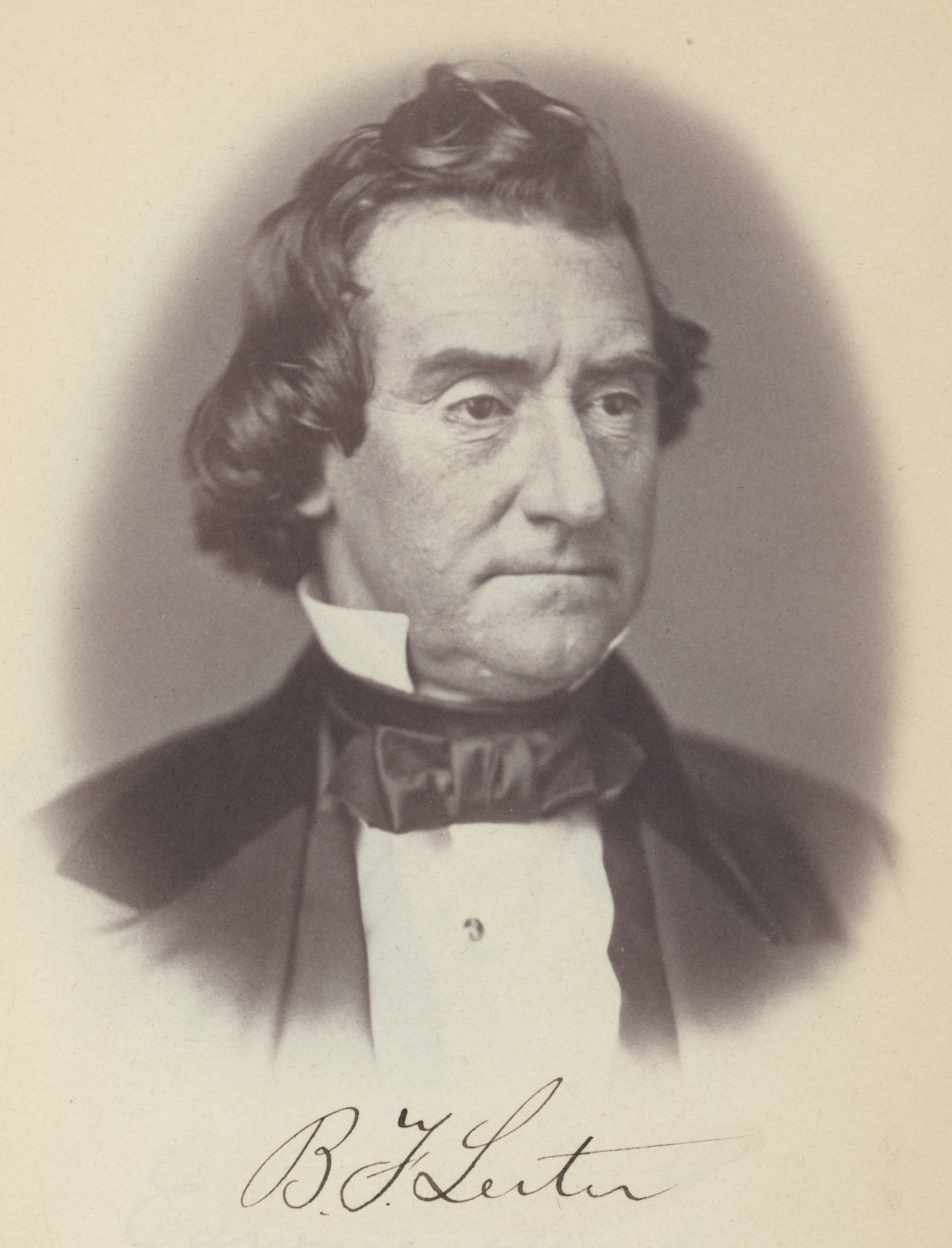
- in 35th Congress

Member of the U.S. House of Representatives from Ohio's 18th district
- In office March 4, 1855 – March 3, 1859
- Preceded by: George Bliss
- Succeeded by: Sidney Edgerton

Member of the Ohio House of Representatives from the Stark County district
- In office December 4, 1848 – December 1, 1850
- Preceded by: John S. Cock
- Succeeded by: Samuel Krider

13th Mayor of Canton
- In office 1852–1853
- Preceded by: J.G. Lester
- Succeeded by: John Lahm

15th Mayor of Canton
- In office 1854–1855
- Preceded by: John Lahm
- Succeeded by: Peter Chance

Personal details
- Born: October 13, 1813 Leitersburg, Maryland
- Died: June 17, 1866 (aged 52) Canton, Ohio
- Resting place: West Lawn Cemetery
- Party: Republican
- Spouse: Catherine Burger
- Children: seven

Benjamin Franklin Leiter (October 13, 1813 – June 17, 1866) was a nineteenth-century politician, lawyer, teacher and justice of the peace from Ohio. He served two terms in the United States House of Representatives from 1855 to 1859.

== Biography ==
Born in Leitersburg, Maryland, Leiter received a limited schooling as a child. He taught school in Maryland from 1830 to 1834 before moving to Ohio where he continued teaching from 1834 to 1842. He studied law at the office of David A. Starkweather. He was admitted to the bar in 1842, commencing practice in Canton, Ohio. Leiter was a justice of the peace and mayor of Canton for ten years. He was a member of the Ohio House of Representatives in 1848 and 1849, serving as Speaker of the House in the latter year. Leiter was elected an Anti-Nebraska candidate and later Republican to the United States House of Representatives in 1854, serving from 1855 to 1859. He died in Canton, Ohio, on June 17, 1866, and was interred in Canton in West Lawn Cemetery.

In 1836, Leiter married Catherine Burger of Canton. They had seven children. He was a Lutheran.

== See also ==
- List of mayors of Canton, Ohio

U.S. House of Representatives
Preceded by George Bliss	Member of the U.S. House of Representatives from Ohio's 18th congressional district March 4, 1855 – March 3, 1859	Succeeded by Sidney Edgerton
Ohio House of Representatives
Preceded by John G. Breslin	Speaker of the House; 1849-1850	Succeeded by John F. Morse
