= Robert Hemphill =

Irish rugby union player

Robert Hemphill DSO
- Born: 26 August 1888 South Dublin, Ireland
- Died: 21 April 1935 (aged 46) Cornwall, England
- School: Royal School, Armagh
- University: Trinity College Dublin
- Notable relative: Samuel Hemphill (father)
- Occupation: Medical doctor

Rugby union career
- Position: Forward
International career
Years	Team	Apps	(Points)
1912	Ireland	4	(0)

Robert Hemphill (26 August 1888 — 21 April 1935) was an Irish international rugby union player.

== Biography ==
Hemphill was the son of Anglican priest Samuel Hemphill, who served as the Archdeacon of Down. He attended The Royal School, Armagh, and Trinity College Dublin, where he studied medicine.

A forward, Hemphill played four years of varsity rugby with Dublin University FC and was capped four times for Ireland, with all of his appearances coming in the 1912 Five Nations Championship.

Hemphill received a commission to the Royal Army Medical Corps as a lieutenant in 1913, following the completion of his studies, then was promoted to captain during World War I. He served in France and in 1918 received the Distinguished Service Order. After the war, Hemphill became a major and was medical officer at the Royal Military Academy, Woolwich.

In 1935, Hemphill took his wife and children on a holiday to Cornwall and was killed when he fell off a 70 foot high cliff, having been attempting to take a photograph of a buzzard's nest. His wife, in attempting to rescue him, also fell and died of her injuries later in hospital.

== See also ==
- List of Ireland national rugby union players
