= Martha Edgerton Rolfe Plassmann =

American feminist and socialist (1850–1936)

- Born: Martha Edgerton; May 14, 1850; Tallmadge, Ohio
- Died: September 25, 1936 (aged 86); Great Falls, Montana
- Spouse: Herbert Percy Rolfe
- Children: Mary Pauline; Harriet L.; Helen M.; Lucia Ione; Edgerton; Edith; Hester

Martha Edgerton Rolfe Plassmann (née Edgerton; May 14, 1850 – September 25, 1936) was a feminist and socialist from Montana, US.

She was born in Tallmadge, Ohio in 1850, the first child of Sidney Edgerton, the first Territorial Governor of Montana.

While teaching at the Ohio Institute for the Blind in Columbus, she met and married Herbert P. Rolfe. In 1876, the couple moved to Helena, and then to Great Falls in 1884.

After moving to Great Falls, Herbert began the Great Falls Leader newspaper, for which Martha became a writer.

In early 1895, alongside other local people, Martha formed the Political Equality Club, which gathered over a thousand signatures—approximately half of which were from men—supporting the right for women's suffrage. This in part led to a suffrage bill being passed by over two-thirds in the Montana House later that year, although it was later tabled in the state Senate.

Soon after the bill was defeated, Herbert died of typhoid, meaning that Martha was widowed with seven children. Martha took over as sole editor of the Great Falls Leader, becoming the first woman in the state of Montana to edit a daily newspaper. In October 1895, Martha married her business manager Theodore Plassmann, and sold the newspaper on his advice. Plassmann died a few months later, leaving Martha with little means of financial support. She took on a variety of business ventures, including writing poetry and running a cattle ranch. She also took on a job selling life insurance, becoming one of the first women in Montana to work in the field of insurance.

After moving from Great Falls to a small ranch near Monarch in the Little Belt Mountains, Martha wrote verses which she sold to Good Housekeeping magazine. When a fire razed her ranch house to the ground, she suffered thousands of dollars in property loss, but with help of neighbours, was able to rebuild a large log home.

After reading socialist material at the Monarch railway station, Martha became a socialist, and the first female member of the Monarch Socialist Party. After moving to Missoula to allow her children to attend university, she began writing socialist articles for the Missoulian, worked in the office of socialist mayor of Butte, Lewis Duncan, and participated in a minor way in the Missoula IWW free speech fight. In November 1916, two years after Montana introduced equal suffrage, Martha wrote to her daughter Helen: "This is a red letter day for me—I went to the polls in an auto and cast my first vote for President of the United States.".

In 1920, Martha moved back to Great Falls, and began writing historical articles for both the Great Falls Tribune and the Montana News Association, basing many pieces on her own experiences or from interviews with other Montana pioneers. She continued writing until her death in September 1936, aged eighty-six.

== Legacy ==
As a pioneer for women's suffrage, socialism and taking on roles in the male dominated fields of newspaper editorship, Plassmann is now celebrated as part of Women's History Month in Montana. Martha's autobiography and over 500 articles written by her have been brought together as the Martha Edgerton Plassmann papers in the Montana Historical Society libraries.

=== The Martha Plassmann Prize ===
Sponsored by the Montana Historical Society, the Martha Plassmann Prize is a $500 cash award and a certificate from the Montana Historical Society. The prize will be awarded to one well-researched National History Day entry by a Montana student or team that utilizes the digitized newspapers available, either on the web site Chronicling America: Historic American Newspapers or on the website Montana Newspapers.
