= Sidney Edgerton =

American politician

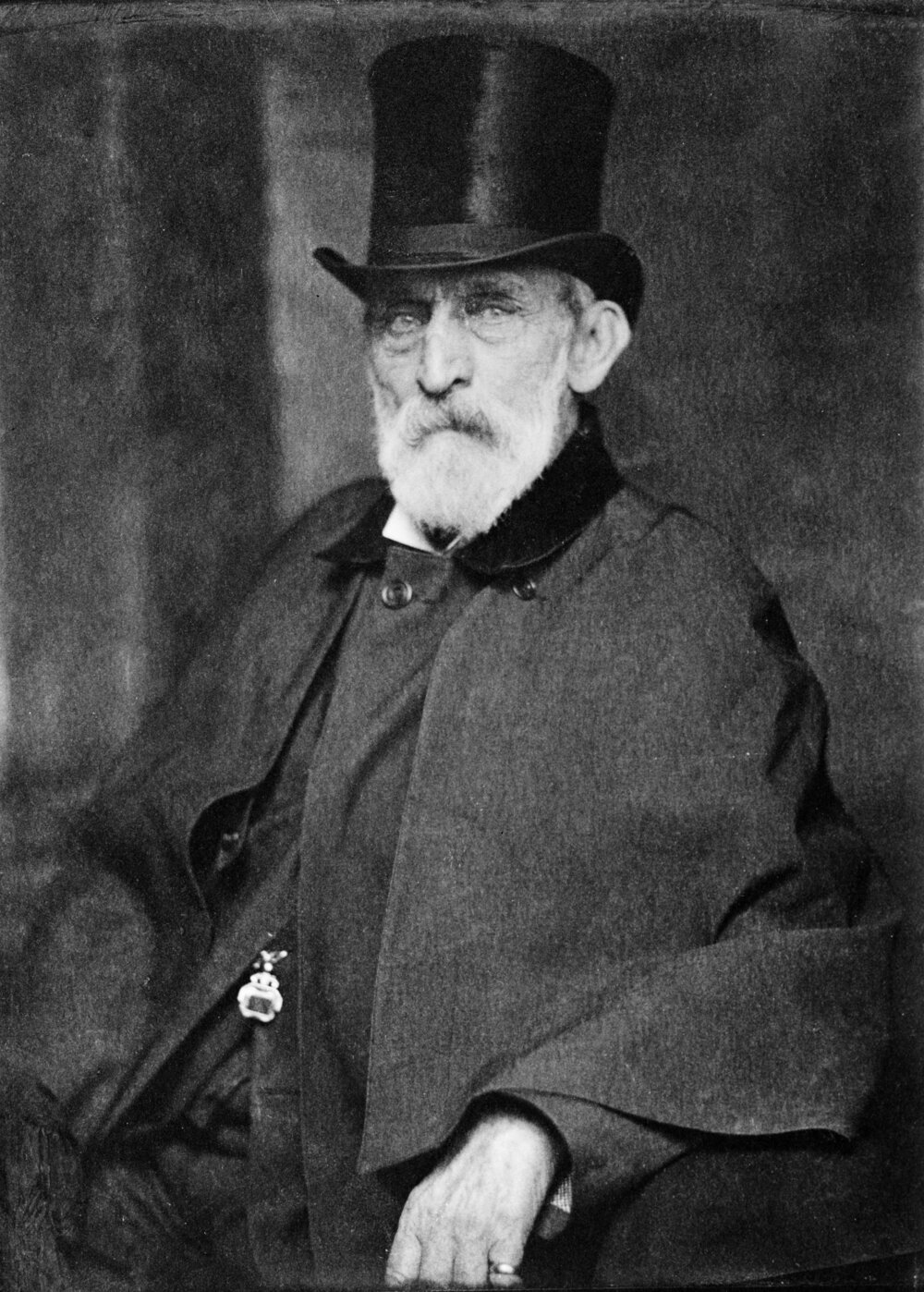
- Edgerton, c. 1890

1st Territorial Governor of Montana
- In office June 22, 1864 – July 12, 1866 (Note: Between September 1865 and October 1866, Thomas F. Meagher served as Acting Governor.)
- Appointed by: Abraham Lincoln
- Preceded by: office established
- Succeeded by: Thomas F. Meagher; Acting Territorial Governor

Chief Justice of the Idaho Territorial Supreme Court
- In office March 10, 1863 – June 22, 1864
- Appointed by: Abraham Lincoln
- Preceded by: office established
- Succeeded by: Silas Woodson

Member of the U.S. House of Representatives from Ohio's 18th District
- In office March 4, 1859 – March 3, 1863
- Preceded by: Benjamin F. Leiter
- Succeeded by: Rufus P. Spalding

Personal details
- Born: August 17, 1818 Cazenovia, New York, US
- Died: July 19, 1900 (aged 81) Akron, Ohio, US
- Resting place: Tallmadge Cemetery, Tallmadge, Ohio
- Party: Free Soil (1848–1856); Republican (1856–1900)
- Spouse: Mary Wright Edgerton
- Children: Martha Edgerton Rolfe Plassmann
- Profession: Politician, Lawyer, Judge, Teacher
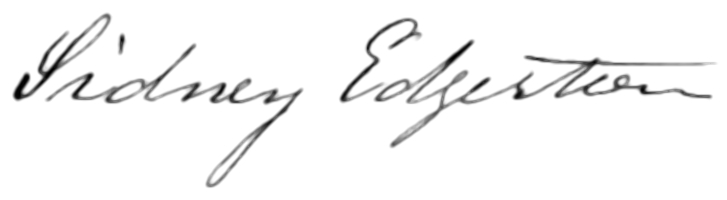
- Signature

Sidney Edgerton (August 17, 1818 – July 19, 1900) was an American politician, lawyer, judge and teacher from Ohio. He served during the American Civil War, as a Squirrel Hunter. During this time, Edgerton served as a U.S. Congressman. In 1863, Abraham Lincoln appointed him the first Chief justice of the Idaho Territorial Supreme Court. Edgerton lobbied for the creation of separate territories, out of the Idaho Territory, and in 1864, Abraham Lincoln appointed Edgerton as the first Territorial Governor of Montana. During his term as Territorial Governor, he was an alleged member of the infamous Montana Vigilantes, and was reputedly among its founders.

He was a sickly child that was not expected to survive; burial clothing was ordered for him. He survived and, eventually, moved to Ohio. He became a lawyer, and was involved in both the Free Soil Party and the Republican Party. After John Brown's raid on Harpers Ferry, Edgerton was invited, by Brown's family, to settle Brown's affairs. He never was able to meet with Brown. He had a successful career as a politician, and after his term ended in the Territory of Montana, Edgerton returned to Ohio. He served as a lawyer in his home state until his death in 1900.

== Early life ==
Edgerton was born in Cazenovia, New York, on August 17, 1818. His parents were Amos and Zerviah (Graham) Edgerton, both of Connecticut. Zerviah was a cousin of millionaire philanthropist Anson Greene Phelps. As a child, Edgerton was so sickly and frail that burial clothes were prepared for him. Whereas the young Edgerton avoided death, the same could not be said for his father, a teacher by trade who had been blind for years. Amos Edgerton died when Sidney was still an infant. Left with six children to raise, Zerviah Edgerton struggled to maintain her family. By age eight, young Sidney was out of the home and working himself through school. He eventually attended the Genesee Wesleyan Seminary in Lima, New York, where his cousin taught, and where he would later become an instructor as well.

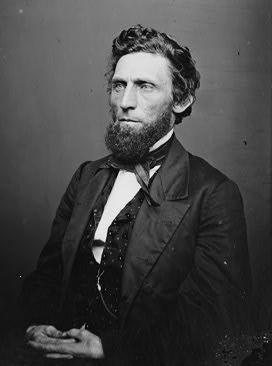
Sidney Edgerton ca. 1860–1865

== Early career ==
In 1844, he moved to Ohio and began working in the law office of Rufus P. Spalding. Edgerton also taught in an academy in Tallmadge, Ohio, the same year. He studied law and graduated from the Cincinnati Law School in 1845. The next year Edgerton was admitted to the bar and began the practice of law in Akron, Ohio. During this time, Edgerton declared himself an Agnostic. He married Mary Wright (1827–1885) of Tallmadge on May 18, 1848, but Mary almost ended the relationship, because of Edgerton's religious views.

== Political career ==
Edgerton was a delegate to the convention that formed the Free Soil Party, in 1848. He then served as prosecuting attorney of Summit County, Ohio, from 1852 to 1856. Later in 1856, Edgerton was a delegate to the first Republican National Convention. That same year, he was nominated for probate judge, but he declined the nomination. Edgerton was elected as a Republican to the United States House of Representatives in 1858.

=== House of Representatives and John Brown ===
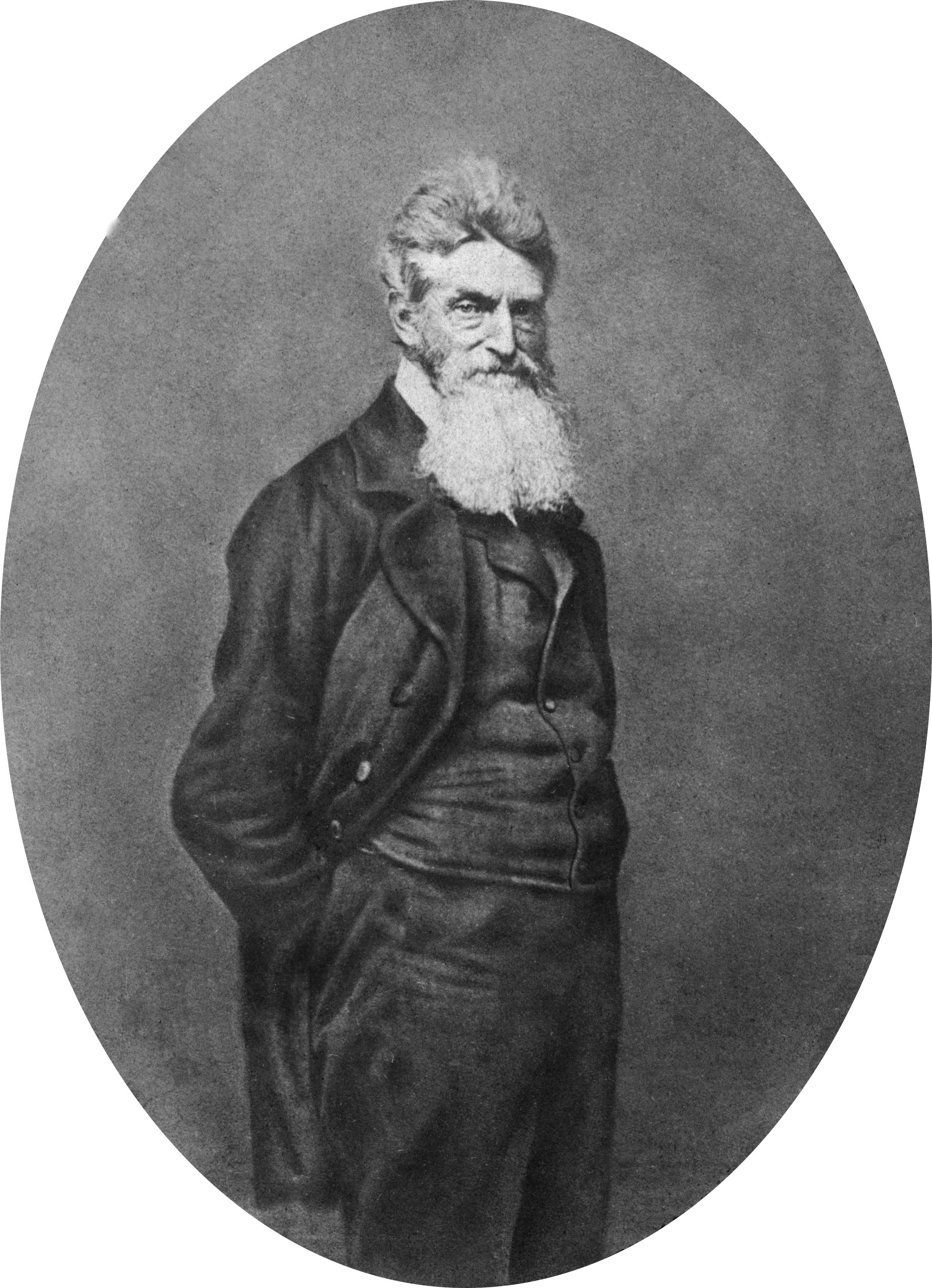
John Brown in 1859

Edgerton began his House term in 1859. As an abolitionist, he was at risk of attack; when his term began, he purchased a sword for his defense. The sword was held, secretly, inside a walking cane. As an ardent anti-slavery member of the House of Representatives, Edgerton made numerous speeches about its abolition. After John Brown's raid on Harpers Ferry, Edgerton was asked by Brown's family to come and settle his affairs. This was very dangerous, as Edgerton was anti-slavery. Edgerton went by train, and was joined by Congressman Alexander Boteler and Congressman H. G. Blake. While on the Baltimore & Ohio Railroad, Boteler was told that the men did not need to go on. Boteler and Blake listened to the advice, but Edgerton refused to go back.

On his arrival at Charles Town, Edgerton found the commander of Harper's Ferry, General William Taliaferro. Edgerton told Taliaferro about his request, but Taliaferro informed him that Governor Wise would only allow family and a minister to visit John Brown. That night, Taliaferro arranged for a wagon to take him back to Washington, D.C. Edgerton was given a driver and a guard, for his journey. During his ride back, a group of men on horses rode up, and Edgerton's guard jumped out of the wagon and ran. The men on horses retrieved the man, and brought him back to the wagon. Edgerton asked his guard why he ran, and the guard replied, "I heard them say that they would kill [you]". The men on horses then attempted to get Edgerton to leave the wagon, but he refused. He eventually made it out of Virginia, but always believed had he left the wagon, the men would have killed him. After this encounter, Edgerton viewed Southerners, generally, with contempt. Edgerton continued to be a large voice in the anti-slavery movement, but decided not to run for reelection in 1862.

== American Civil War ==
During the Civil War, Edgerton served briefly as colonel in the Ohio Militia. Edgerton was one of the Squirrel Hunters, expert shots from Ohio, and served at the Defense of Cincinnati. Edgerton served as both a U.S. Congressman and soldier at the same time, during the first few years of the war.

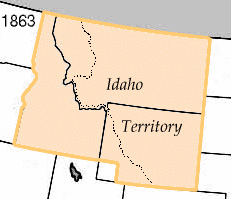
Idaho Territory in 1863

=== Territory of Idaho ===
On March 6, 1863, Edgerton was nominated by President Abraham Lincoln to be Chief Justice of the Idaho Territorial Supreme Court, and he was confirmed by the senate four days later. His salary was to be $2,500 a year (about $34,000 in 2009). He left with his wife, his children, his niece, Lucia Darling, his nephew, Wilbur F. Sanders, Sanders' wife, Sanders' children, a family friend, Henry Tilden, and a young woman named Almarette Greer. Edgerton's group first travelled to Cleveland, Ohio, by train, they then traveled, by boat, across Lake Erie, continuing, by train, to St. Joseph, Missouri, they then travelled, by steamboat, to Omaha, Nebraska. They then bought their provisions, and began their trip on ox-drawn wagons. The party was met by good weather, and no bad confrontations with Native Americans. The group stopped at Chimney Rock, to visit. They then started off again, on their trip. One incident that did happen was when Edgerton fell from one of the wagons, and was almost crushed by one of the wheels. The group arrived at South Pass, in August 1863. After arriving in South Pass City, Edgerton received a telegraph message saying that the capital of the Territory of Idaho had yet to be decided. On August 15, as the group was heading west, a man arrived with a telegraph message saying that the capital of the Territory of Idaho was to be at Lewiston. The message was welcome news to the group, but knew that to get to Lewiston, before the snows, would be difficult. As the group descended the western slopes of the Rocky Mountains, it was discovered that Mary Edgerton was pregnant. In September, the group arrived at the trail, beginning at the Blackfoot River. Edgerton realized, that it would not be possible to make it to Lewiston, before the snows. The group then changed its course for Bannack. The party crossed the Snake River, by ferry, on September 6. After crossing, they met Sheriff Henry Plummer. This would not be the last meeting between Edgerton and Plummer. The group continued, and crossed Monida Pass. The group finally made it to Bannack, on September 16.

After arriving in Bannack, Idaho Territory, Edgerton reported to Territorial Governor William Wallace. Edgerton requested the designation of courts and districts, but no court was designated for his district. Wallace appointed Edgerton to one of the farthest and most remote places away from the capitol. When he arrived there was no administrator to administer the oath of office. He never took the oath of office and therefore he never legally took his position as Chief Justice. The Edgerton's then bought a home at a Sheriff's sale for $400. The one room home became the first Montana Governor's Residence. After arriving in his district, he began taking tours of the territory gold fields and gold camps. Edgerton realized the value of the gold fields, to the Union. He was then chosen, by the local population, to go to Washington D.C. His mission was to lobby for the split of the Territory of Idaho. Edgerton and Sanders then left in a stagecoach for Washington. Edgerton arrived with $2,500 in gold nuggets in his pockets (about $34,000 in 2009). He presented this to President Abraham Lincoln and numerous members of Congress. His lobbying paid off in 1864. That year the Territory of Idaho split into three parts. The three parts included the Territory of Idaho, the Territory of Montana, and the Territory of Dakota.

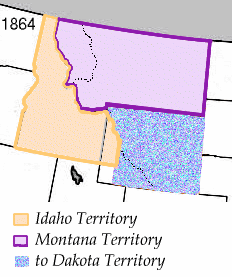
Idaho Territory, Montana Territory, and Dakota Territory, in 1864

=== Territory of Montana ===
Before leaving Washington, D.C. for the Territory of Idaho, Edgerton had a private meeting with President Abraham Lincoln, in which he asked for the position of Territorial Governor of Montana. Lincoln told Edgerton that he would think about it. Edgerton then left for the west, unsure of whether or not he would have a new position when he arrived, but on May 23, 1864, while on his way home, Mary Edgerton had a baby girl. She named her Idaho, unknowing of the fact that it was now the Territory of Montana. After seeing his skills in the Territory of Idaho, President Abraham Lincoln appointed Edgerton as the first Territorial Governor of Montana.

Lincoln appointed Edgerton on June 22, 1864, and Edgerton found out on his arrival at Bannack. Bannack was created the capital of Montana Territory, and the Edgertons were able to keep their same home. Edgerton was not supported by many settlers and miners in the Territory, as the majority were from border states and either supported the Confederacy or were Democrats who abhorred radical Republicans like him. There were even death threats for those who flew an American Flag. Edgerton put together a quick census, so that an election could be held. The elections would be for the State Council, State House, and for the Delegate of the Territory of Montana to the House of Representatives. After the elections of 1865, Democrats took power in the House, and took the Delegate seat in the House of Representatives. While the Republicans took the Council. Numerous engagements between the Governor and Democrats occurred, causing troubles for the Montana Legislature. In all, though, the legislature worked with Edgerton to pass numerous bills on roads, public education, irrigation, and mining.

In 1865, Edgerton began to have to deal with threats from Native Americans. General Patrick Connor was sent to handle these threats. He led an expedition against the Sioux and Cheyenne Indians, who were disrupting travelers along the Bozeman Trail. Edgerton then issued a proclamation for five hundred volunteers to help defend immigrants. Numerous other battles were fought, and numerous treaties were signed between the Government of the Territory of Montana and the Native Americans.

In 1865, Edgerton was forced to go East to secure funds for the territory. The revenues being received were not enough to pay for expenses, and Edgerton himself gave large sums of his own money to the territory. He hoped to both get funds for the state, and receive compensation for his expenditures. He would receive neither. Edgerton left the Territory, in September 1865. During this time, Edgerton was in Washington, D.C. While he was away, Thomas Francis Meagher served as the acting Territorial Governor of Montana. Despite remaining governor, until January 13, 1866, Edgerton did not return to Montana for 25 years. To express their dislike for Edgerton, the state legislature changed the name of Edgerton County to Lewis and Clark County.

Sheriff Henry Plummer, before his lynching

=== Montana Vigilantes ===
After numerous acts of lawlessness, and with no established court system, Edgerton supported his nephew, Wilbur F. Sanders, and other residents of Bannack and Virginia City as they organized the Vigilantes. This group began meeting in secret, and began trying and lynching suspected criminals. On January 10, 1864, members of the Vigilance Committee traveled to Sheriff Henry Plummer's home. Plummer was suspected of murder, and the men coaxed him from his sickbed. They then grabbed him, and brought him to a gallows he had constructed for hangings. Then the men put a noose over his neck, and hanged him next to two of his deputies who were also accused of being road agents. Along with the lynching of Plummer, the Montana Vigilantes hanged 22 road agents. After these actions Edgerton's nephew, Wilbur F. Sanders, was forced to defend the group in Utah courts.

== Death ==
After returning to Akron, Ohio, with his family in the Fall of 1865, Edgerton went back to his law practice. He was involved in his law practice until his death on July 19, 1900. He is buried in Tallmadge Cemetery in Tallmadge, Ohio.

== Citations ==
U.S. House of Representatives
Preceded by Benjamin F. Leiter	Member of the U.S. House of Representatives from Ohio's 18th congressional district March 4, 1859 – March 3, 1863	Succeeded by Rufus P. Spalding
Political offices
Preceded by (none)	Chief justice of the Idaho Territorial Supreme Court; 1863–1864	Succeeded by Silas Woodson
Preceded by (none)	Territorial Governor of Montana; 1864–1866	Succeeded by Thomas F. Meagher; Acting Territorial Governor
