= Fay King Imhoff =

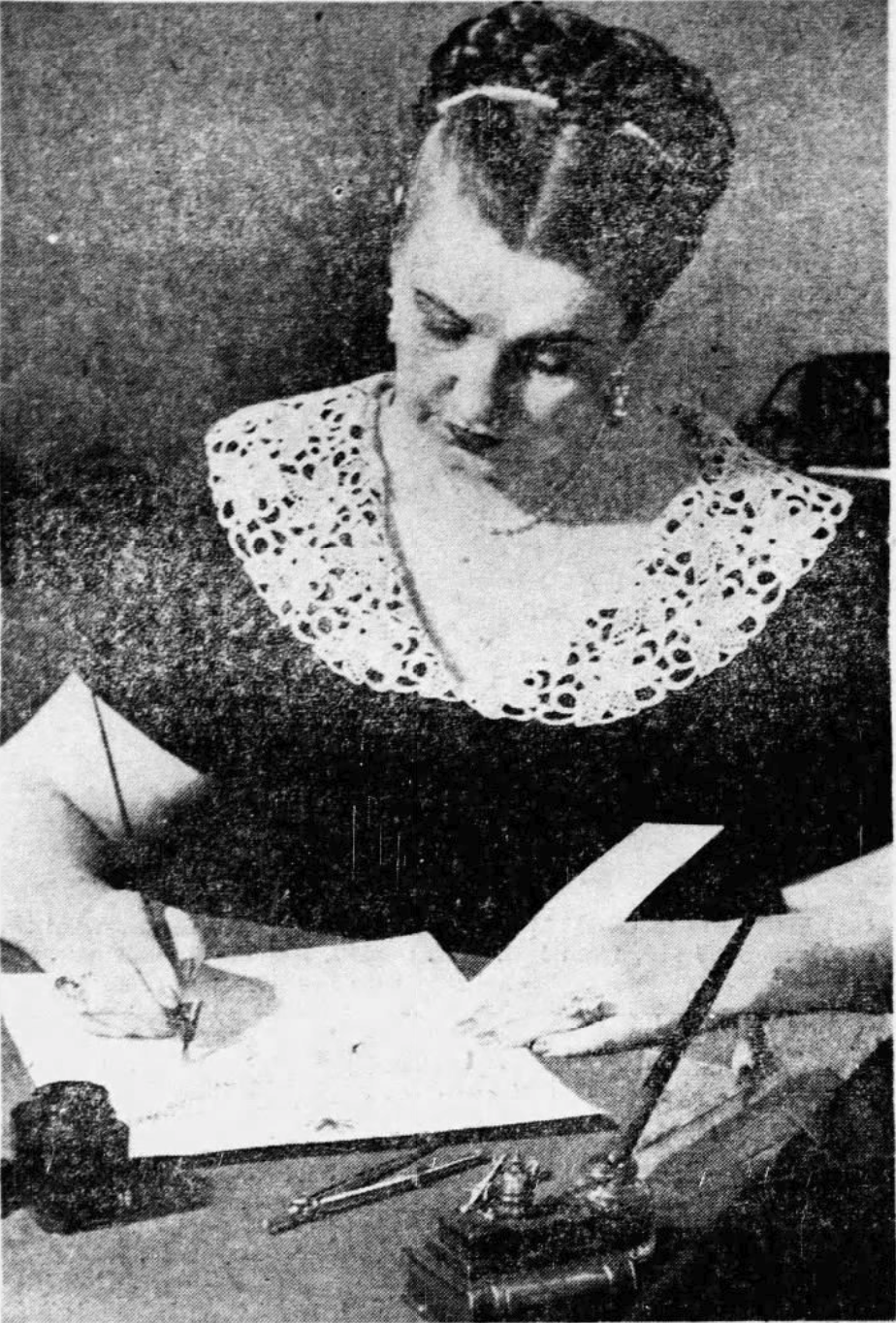
- Imhoff c. 1952
- Born: Fay King; November 11, 1904; New Burnside, Illinois
- Died: April 13, 1989 (aged 84); Fort Myers, Florida
- Occupation: Calligrapher
- Known for: Invitations to presidential inaugurations
- Spouse: Lawrence E. Imhoff (m. 1950)

Fay King Imhoff (11 November 1904 – 13 April 1989) was an American calligrapher. Her work in Washington, D.C., included producing invitations for the inaugurations of presidents Truman, Eisenhower, Kennedy, Johnson, and Nixon.

== Early life ==
She was born Fay King into a farming family in New Burnside, Illinois, on 11 November 1904. As a child, her father criticized her handwriting, and she began to focus on improving her presentation, taking any opportunity she found to study penmanship.

She studied at Southern Illinois University Carbondale, earning a teaching certificate before she was 17, and worked for a decade as a teacher before moving to Washington to work for Louisiana congressman James H. Morrison. There, she met Ohio congressman Lawrence E. Imhoff, whom she would marry in 1950.

== Career ==
During World War II Imhoff worked as a cryptographer and lived in London. While there, she produced an illuminated copy of the royal coat of arms which she presented to the princesses Elizabeth and Margaret.

Her first major calligraphy commission occurred in 1946 when a committee asked her to prepare invitations for dignitaries invited to a memorial for Franklin D. Roosevelt. She went on to illuminate a scroll granting a citizenship award to Douglas MacArthur, and then was asked to prepare 30,000 invitations to Truman's inauguration. She made 50,000 for Eisenhower's first inauguration, 52,000 for his second, and 125,000 for Kennedy's. A television crew once filmed her preparing an invitation in approximately 22.5 seconds.

Between inaugurations, she was employed in the federal government. Imhoff could skillfully reproduce signatures and was authorized to sign official documents on behalf of certain government officials.

== Later life ==
Imhoff and her husband retired to Fort Myers, Florida in 1964. She died in Fort Myers on 13 April 1989. Her husband had died the previous year.
