= Robert Walker Tayler =

American judge

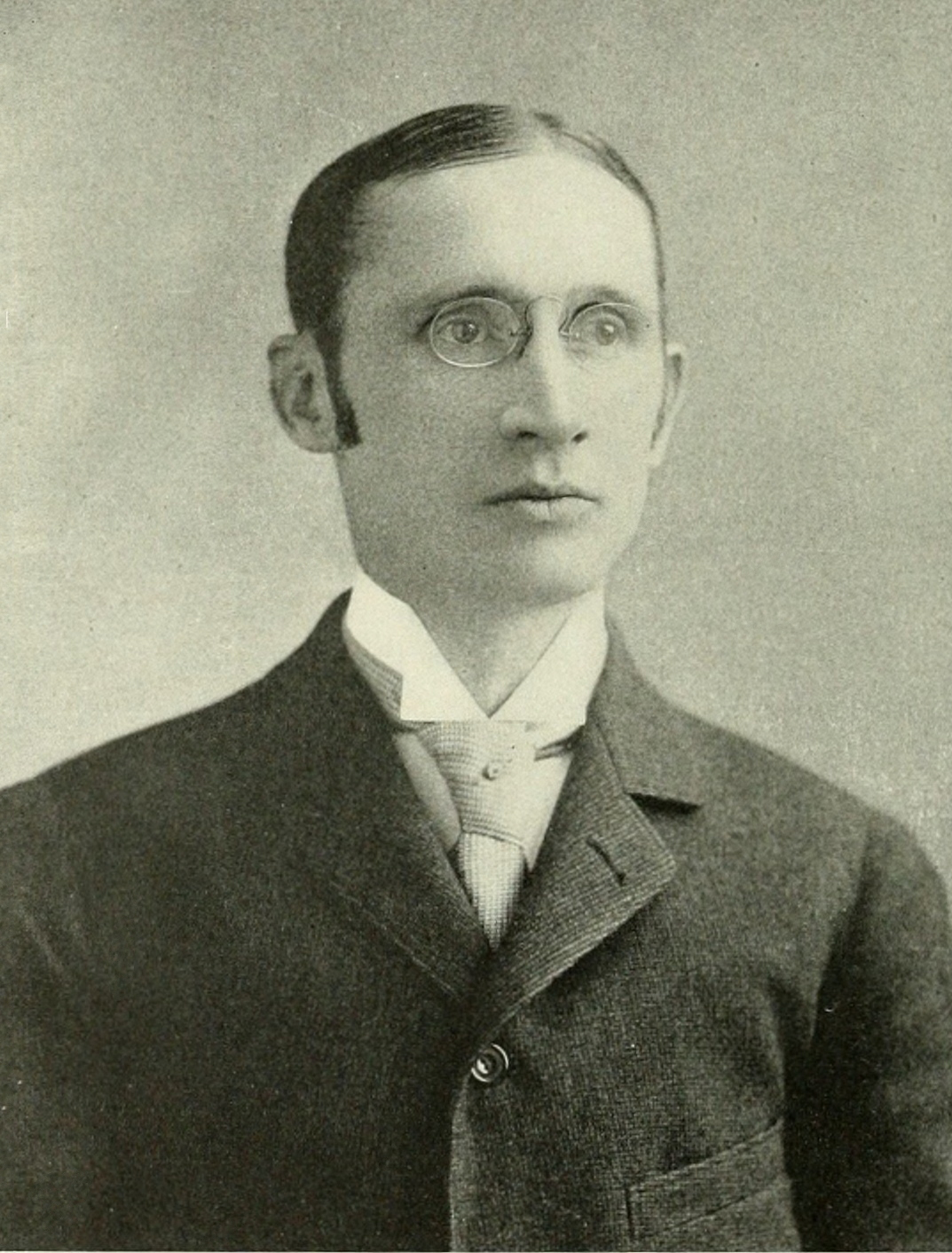

Judge of the United States District Court for the Northern District of Ohio
- In office January 10, 1905 – November 25, 1910
- Appointed by: Theodore Roosevelt
- Preceded by: Francis Joseph Wing
- Succeeded by: William Louis Day

Member of the U.S. House of Representatives from Ohio's 18th district
- In office March 4, 1895 – March 3, 1903
- Preceded by: George P. Ikirt
- Succeeded by: James Kennedy

Personal details
- Born: Robert Walker Tayler; November 26, 1852 Youngstown, Ohio, U.S.
- Died: November 25, 1910 (aged 57) Cleveland, Ohio, U.S.
- Resting place: Lisbon Cemetery; Lisbon, Ohio
- Party: Republican
- Education: Case Western Reserve University (A.B.) read law

Robert Walker Tayler (November 26, 1852 – November 25, 1910) was an American lawyer, jurist, and politician who served four terms as a United States representative from Ohio from 1895 to 1903. He also served as a United States district judge of the United States District Court for the Northern District of Ohio.

== Education and career ==
Born on November 26, 1852, in Youngstown, Mahoning County, Ohio, Tayler attended the public schools, received an Artium Baccalaureus degree in 1872 from Western Reserve College (now Case Western Reserve University) and read law in 1877. Prior to practicing law, he taught in the high school in Lisbon, Ohio and served as superintendent of schools from 1873 to 1875. He was editor of the Buckeye State in Lisbon from 1875 to 1876. He entered private practice in East Liverpool, Ohio from 1877 to 1880. He was prosecutor for Columbiana County, Ohio from 1880 to 1885. He resumed private practice in Lisbon, Ohio from 1885 to 1890, and from 1892 to 1895. He was in private practice in New York City, New York from 1890 to 1892.

== Congressional service ==
Tayler was elected as a Republican from Ohio's 18th congressional district to the United States House of Representatives of the 54th United States Congress and to the three succeeding Congresses, serving from March 4, 1895 to March 3, 1903. He was Chairman of the Committee on Elections No. 1 for the 55th through 57th United States Congresses. He declined to be a candidate in 1902 for renomination. He resumed private practice of law in Youngstown from 1903 to 1905.

== Federal judicial service ==
Tayler was nominated by President Theodore Roosevelt on January 6, 1905, to a seat on the United States District Court for the Northern District of Ohio vacated by Judge Francis Joseph Wing. He was confirmed by the United States Senate on January 10, 1905, and received his commission the same day. His service terminated on November 25, 1910, due to his death in Cleveland, Ohio, where he had moved following his appointment to the federal bench. He was interred in Lisbon Cemetery in Lisbon.

== Family ==
Tayler was the son of Mayor Robert Walker Tayler Sr.

== Sources ==
- "Robert Walker Tayler". Biographical Directory of the United States Congress.

U.S. House of Representatives
Preceded by George P. Ikirt	Member of the U.S. House of Representatives from Ohio's 18th congressional district 1895–1903	Succeeded by James Kennedy
Legal offices
Preceded by Francis Joseph Wing	Judge of the United States District Court for the Northern District of Ohio; 1905–1910	Succeeded by William Louis Day
