= Francis Joseph Wing =

American judge (1850–1918)

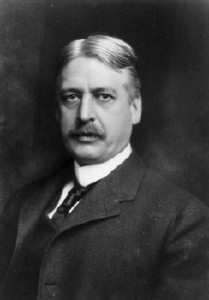

Judge of the United States District Court for the Northern District of Ohio
- In office January 23, 1901 – February 1, 1905
- Appointed by: William McKinley
- Preceded by: Seat established by 31 Stat. 726
- Succeeded by: Robert Walker Tayler

Personal details
- Born: Francis Joseph Wing; September 14, 1850 North Bloomfield, Ohio, US
- Died: February 2, 1918 (aged 67) Cleveland, Ohio, US
- Party: Republican
- Education: Harvard University

Francis Joseph Wing (September 14, 1850 – February 2, 1918) was an American judge and lawyer. He was a United States district judge of the United States District Court for the Northern District of Ohio.

== Early life ==
Wing was born on September 14, 1850, in North Bloomfield, Ohio. His parents were Mary (née Brown) and Joseph Knowles Wing. He was educated at Phillips Academy.

At Harvard University Wing was a member of Delta Kappa Epsilon (aka The Dickey Club). He left in 1871 during his junior year.

Wing read law for a year with: Caleb Blodgett at Boston, Massachusetts; Judge Buckingham of Newark, New Jersey; and Edward O. Fitch of Ashtabula, Ohio. He was admitted to the Ohio bar in 1874.

== Career ==
In 1874, Wing started a private practice in Cleveland, Ohio. Two years later, he became a member of the firm Coon & Wing. He left the practice in 1880 when he became the Assistant United States Attorney of the Northern District of Ohio from 1880 to 1881.

In 1897, Wing was one of the founders of the Cleveland Law School. Governor Asa S. Bushnell appointed Wing to the position of judge of the Cuyahoga County Court of Common Pleas from 1899 to 1901. He was Republican in politics.

Wing was nominated by President William McKinley on January 21, 1901, to the United States District Court for the Northern District of Ohio, to a new seat authorized by 31 Stat. 726. He was confirmed by the United States Senate on January 23, 1901, and received his commission the same day. He resigned from service on February 1, 1905. Following his resignation from the federal bench, Wing resumed private practice in Cleveland.

== Personal life ==
Wing married Mary Brackett Remington of Cleveland on September 25, 1878. They had three daughters, Virginia Remington, Marie Remington, and Stephanie Remington.

Wing died on February 2, 1918, in Cleveland, Ohio.

== References. ==
Legal offices
Preceded by Seat established by 31 Stat. 726	Judge of the United States District Court for the Northern District of Ohio; 1901–1905	Succeeded by Robert Walker Tayler
