= Matthias Shepler =

American politician (1790–1863)

Member of the U.S. House of Representatives from Ohio's 18th district
- In office March 4, 1837 – March 3, 1839 Serving with George Dunbar
- Preceded by: Benjamin Jones
- Succeeded by: David A. Starkweather

Member of the Ohio House of Representatives from the Stark County district
- In office December 7, 1829 – December 4, 1831
- Preceded by: John Grubb
- Succeeded by: James Allen; John Harris

Member of the Ohio Senate from the Stark County district
- In office December 3, 1832 – December 4, 1836
- Preceded by: John Augustine
- Succeeded by: David A. Starkweather

Personal details
- Born: November 11, 1790 Westmoreland County, Pennsylvania, U.S.
- Died: April 7, 1863 (aged 72) Navarre, Ohio, U.S.
- Resting place: Shepler Church Cemetery
- Party: Democratic
- Spouses: Elizabeth Retan (m. 1816) Elizabeth Bechtel (died 1837): Sarah Sherman Linerade
- Children: 7

Matthias Shepler (November 11, 1790 – April 7, 1863) was a U.S. representative from Ohio for one term from 1837 to 1839.

== Early life and career ==
Matthias Shepler was born on November 11, 1790, in Westmoreland County, Pennsylvania. He received limited schooling.

== Career ==
Shepler served in the War of 1812. He moved to Ohio in April 1818 and settled in Bethlehem Township, Stark County, Ohio.

Shepler engaged in agricultural pursuits. He was in the Justice of the Peace for thirty years. He served as county commissioner for two terms. He served as member of the Ohio House of Representatives in 1829. He served in the Ohio Senate in 1832.

Shepler was elected as a Democrat to the Twenty-fifth Congress (March 4, 1837 – March 3, 1839), defeating Whig candidate Samuel Quinby. He served as chairman of the Committee on Revisal and Unfinished Business (Twenty-fifth Congress). Shepler declined to be a candidate for renomination in 1838.

== Personal life ==
Shepler married Elizabeth Retan in 1816. They had one son, John R. Shepler married Elizabeth Bechtel. They had six children. His wife died in 1837. He married Sarah (née Sherman) Linerade, widow of Otho Linerade and daughter of John Sherman. They had no children. He was a member of the Church of the United Brethren in Christ.

Shepler moved to Navarre, Ohio, in 1860. He died on April 7, 1863, in Navarre. He was interred in Shepler Church Cemetery, near Navarre.

== Sources ==
- United States Congress. "Matthias Shepler (id: S000333)". Biographical Directory of the United States Congress.

U.S. House of Representatives
Preceded by Benjamin Jones	Member of the U.S. House of Representatives from Ohio's 18th congressional district March 4, 1837 – March 3, 1839	Succeeded by David A. Starkweather
