= David Hollingsworth =

American politician

David H. Hollingsworth
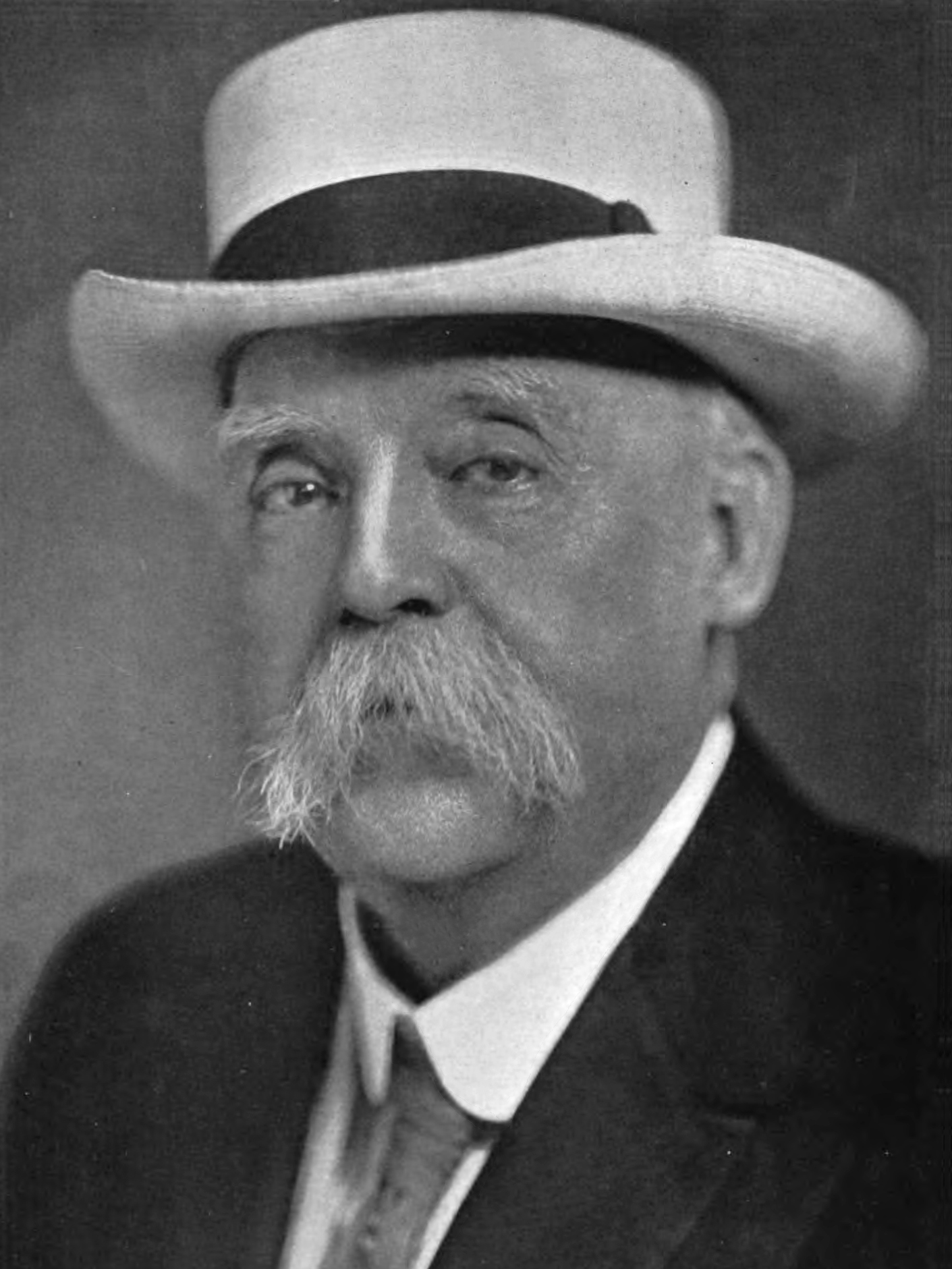

Member of the U.S. House of Representatives from Ohio
- In office March 4, 1909 – March 3, 1911
- Preceded by: Capell L. Weems
- Succeeded by: William B. Francis
- Constituency: 16th district
- In office March 4, 1915 – March 3, 1919
- Preceded by: John J. Whitacre
- Succeeded by: B. Frank Murphy
- Constituency: 18th district

16th Ohio Attorney General
- In office April 21, 1883 – January 14, 1884
- Appointed by: Charles Foster
- Preceded by: George K. Nash
- Succeeded by: James Lawrence

Member of the Ohio Senate from the 20th district
- In office January 4, 1880 – April 21, 1883
- Preceded by: David Wagener
- Succeeded by: Solomon Hogue

Personal details
- Born: David Adams Hollingsworth; November 21, 1844 Belmont, Ohio, U.S.
- Died: December 3, 1929 (aged 85) Cadiz, Ohio, U.S.
- Resting place: Cadiz Cemetery
- Party: Republican
- Spouse: Linda McBean
- Children: two
- Education: Mount Union College

Military service
- Branch/service: Union Army
- Years of service: 1861–1863
- Unit: 25th Ohio Infantry

David Adams Hollingsworth (November 21, 1844 – December 3, 1929) was an American lawyer and Civil War veteran who served three terms as a U.S. representative from Ohio in the early 20th century.

== Early life and career ==
Born in Belmont, Ohio, Hollingsworth moved with his parents to Flushing, Ohio. He attended the public schools.

=== Civil War ===
He was a private in Company B, 25th Ohio Infantry Regiment of the Union Army from 1861 to 1863. He studied law at Mount Union College, Alliance, Ohio.

=== Early legal career ===
He was admitted to the bar in St. Clairsville, Ohio, on September 17, 1867, and commenced practice in Flushing.

== Political career ==
He served as mayor of Flushing in 1867. He moved to Cadiz, Ohio, in 1869 and continued the practice of law.

Hollingsworth was elected prosecuting attorney of Harrison County in 1873 and reelected in 1875. He served as member of the State senate in 1879 and reelected in 1881. He was admitted to practice before the United States Supreme Court in 1880. He served as chairman of the Republican State convention in 1882. On April 21, 1883, he resigned as Senator to accept appointment as Ohio Attorney General. He did not run for re-election and served until January 14, 1884. He resumed the practice of law in Cadiz. He was one of the organizers of the Ohio State Bar Association, serving as chairman in 1908.

=== Congress ===
Hollingsworth was elected as a Republican to the Sixty-first Congress (March 4, 1909 – March 3, 1911). He was an unsuccessful candidate for reelection in 1910 to the Sixty-second Congress. He resumed the practice of law in Cadiz.

Hollingsworth was elected to the Sixty-fourth and Sixty-fifth Congresses (March 4, 1915 – March 3, 1919). He declined to be a candidate for renomination in 1918.

== Later career and death ==
He resumed the practice of law until his death in Cadiz, Ohio, December 3, 1929. He was interred in Cadiz Cemetery.

== Personal life ==
He was married April 8, 1875, to Linda McBean of Cadiz. She had two sons, Henry, and Donald, who died in early childhood. Hollingsworth was a Mason, Elk, Knight of Pythias, Methodist, and member of the Grand Army of the Republic.

== Sources ==
Legal offices
Preceded by George K. Nash	Attorney General of Ohio; 1883–1884	Succeeded by James Lawrence
U.S. House of Representatives
Preceded by Capell L. Weems	Member of the U.S. House of Representatives from Ohio's 17th congressional district 1909–1911	Succeeded by William B. Francis
Preceded by John J. Whitacre	Member of the U.S. House of Representatives from Ohio's 18th congressional district 1915–1919	Succeeded by B. Frank Murphy
