= James Kennedy (Ohio politician) =

American politician and lawyer

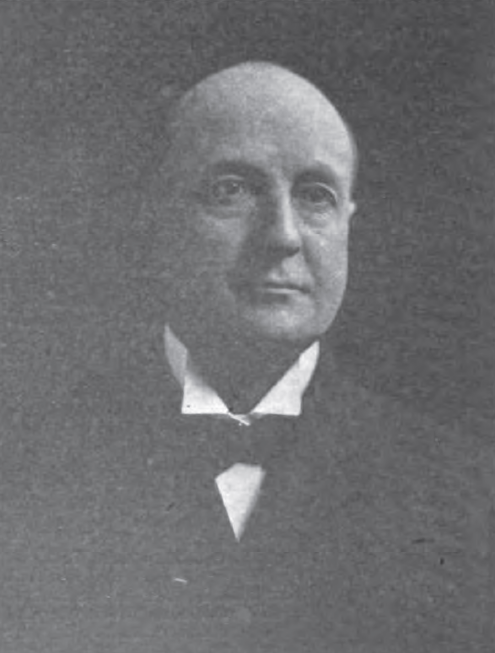

Member of the U.S. House of Representatives from Ohio's 18th district
- In office March 4, 1903 – March 3, 1911
- Preceded by: Robert Walker Tayler
- Succeeded by: John J. Whitacre

Personal details
- Born: September 3, 1853 Lowellville, Ohio, U.S.
- Died: November 9, 1928 (aged 75) Youngstown, Ohio, U.S.
- Resting place: Riverside Cemetery, Poland, Ohio
- Party: Democratic, Republican

James Kennedy (September 3, 1853 – November 9, 1928) was an American lawyer and politician who served as a U.S. representative from Ohio for four terms from 1903 to 1911.

== Early life and education ==
Born in Lowellville, Ohio, Kennedy prepared for college at Poland Union Seminary, in Ohio, and graduated from Westminster College, New Wilmington, Pennsylvania, in 1876. He studied law and was admitted to the bar in March 1879.

== Political career ==
Kennedy commenced to practice law in Youngstown, Ohio, where he also served as a member of the city council from April 1886 to November 1888. In 1894, he served as chairman of the Republican State convention at Steubenville, Ohio, in 1894.

=== Congress ===
Kennedy was elected as a Republican to the Fifty-eighth and to the three succeeding Congresses (March 4, 1903 – March 3, 1911). He was an unsuccessful candidate for reelection in 1910, to the Sixty-second Congress. He resumed the practice of his profession in Youngstown.

=== Later career and death ===
Kennedy became affiliated with the Democratic Party in 1916. He was an unsuccessful Democratic candidate for election in 1926, to the Seventieth Congress. He died in Youngstown on November 9, 1928, and was interred in Riverside Cemetery, Poland, Ohio.

== Sources ==
- United States Congress. "James Kennedy (id: K000106)". Biographical Directory of the United States Congress.

U.S. House of Representatives
Preceded by Robert W. Tayler	Member of the U.S. House of Representatives from Ohio's 18th congressional district 1903-1911	Succeeded by John J. Whitacre
