= Kreider =

Kreider is a surname. Notable people with the surname include:

- Alan Kreider (1941–2017), American Mennonite church historian
- Alec Devon Kreider (1991–2017), American murderer
- Chris Kreider (born 1991), American ice hockey player
- Dan Kreider (born 1977), American football player
- Jim Kreider (born 1955), American politician
- Kalee Kreider (born 1971), American environmental communicator
- Steve Kreider (born 1958), American football player

== See also ==
- Kreider Shoe Manufacturing Company
- Krider (disambiguation)
