= John J. Whitacre =

American politician (1860–1938)

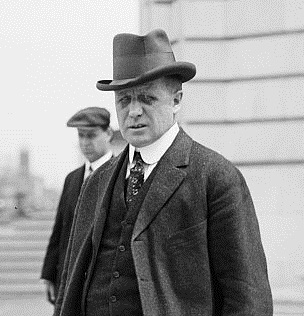
- Whitacre in 1913

Member of the U.S. House of Representatives from Ohio's 18th district
- In office March 4, 1911 – March 3, 1915
- Preceded by: James Kennedy
- Succeeded by: David Hollingsworth

Personal details
- Born: John Jefferson Whitacre; December 28, 1860 Decatur, Nebraska
- Died: December 2, 1938 (aged 77) Miami, Florida, U.S.
- Resting place: Magnolia Cemetery, Magnolia, Ohio
- Party: Democratic
- Spouse: Cordelia Brothers
- Education: Hiram (Ohio) College; University of Michigan

John Jefferson Whitacre (December 28, 1860 – December 2, 1938) was an American businessman and politician who served two terms as a U.S. representative from Ohio from 1911 to 1915.

== Biography ==
Born in Decatur, Nebraska, Whitacre attended the public schools, Hiram (Ohio) College, and the University of Michigan at Ann Arbor. He engaged as a manufacturer of hollow building tile. He served as delegate to the 1912 Democratic National Convention. He was an unsuccessful candidate in 1908 to the Sixty-first Congress. He had a home built in Brown Township, Carroll County, Ohio. During the 1920 presidential campaign, both candidates, Warren G Harding and James M. Cox visited his home.

Whitacre was elected as a Democrat to the Sixty-second and Sixty-third Congresses (March 4, 1911 – March 3, 1915).

He announced he would not run for a third term in 1914:

All I've done since I've been in Washington has been to sit around and try to look wise, and that's what any man has to do who isn't willing to barter his convictions for political expediency. ... No man who wants to be intellectually honest has any business in congress.

— J. J. Whitacre, 1913

He resumed his former manufacturing pursuits. He served as president of the Whitacre Engineering Co. and the Whitacre-Greer Fireproofing Co. He was nominated in 1928 for the 18th district, but lost. He died in Miami, Florida, December 2, 1938. He was interred in Magnolia Cemetery, Magnolia, Ohio.

== Sources ==
- United States Congress. "John J. Whitacre (id: W000347)". Biographical Directory of the United States Congress.

U.S. House of Representatives
Preceded by James Kennedy	Member of the U.S. House of Representatives from Ohio's 18th congressional district 1911-1915	Succeeded by David Hollingsworth
