= Marie Remington Wing =

American politician (1885–1982)

- Born: November 5, 1885; Cleveland, Ohio
- Died: December 27, 1982 (aged 97); Mentor, Ohio
- Education: Cleveland–Marshall College of Law (Formerly Cleveland Law School)
- Occupation: New Deal Lawyer
- Known for: First woman on Cleveland city council, early 20th century progressive activism
- Title: Cleveland City Councilman At-large
- Term: 1923–1927
- Partner: Dorothy Smith
- Parent: Francis Joseph Wing

Marie Remington Wing (November 5, 1885 – December 27, 1982) was an American lawyer and progressive activist who became the first woman to serve on the Cleveland City Council in Ohio. She established the Women’s Bureau in the Cleveland Police Department. As a New Deal lawyer, Wing guided legislators in creating new bureaus and agencies, and advised the Social Security Board in their earliest compliance hearings.

== Early life and education ==
Marie Remington Wing was born in Cleveland, Ohio to parents Francis Joseph Wing and Mary Brackett Remington. She had an older sister, Virginia, and a younger sister, Stephanie. Her father was a judge in the Cuyahoga County Court of Common Pleas and eventually a federal judge serving in the United States District Court for Northern Ohio. Her sister, Virginia, was employed as the executive secretary of both the Cleveland Anti-Tuberculosis League and the Cleveland Health Council’s Health Education Department.

Wing attended Miss Mittleberg’s School for Young Ladies in Cleveland in order to prepare for college. She attended Bryn Mawr College in Pennsylvania until her family’s financial struggles caused her to seek employment back in Cleveland.

== Career ==
=== YWCA (1907–1922) ===
Wing found paid employment at the Young Women’s Christian Association (YWCA) in Cleveland. She started work with the YWCA as a receptionist in 1907. After a short period of time, she attained the positions of industrial secretary and financial secretary. As industrial secretary, Wing worked with factory girls to improve their education, aiming to guide them towards safe, healthy, moral recreation. After just over a decade at the Cleveland chapter, Wing moved to New York where she became general secretary and held a spot on the board of trustees. She returned to Cleveland in 1918 to take a spot as general secretary back at the Cleveland Metropolitan YWCA. She used this position as general secretary to push for proportional representation in Cleveland city government, and sat on the charter review which resulted in increased proportional representation.

=== Cleveland City Council bids (1923–1927) ===
After leaving the YWCA to attend Cleveland Law School, Wing found herself encouraged by her peers to run for a new city council seat. She ran as an Independent in the 1923 election and won. This made her the first woman, alongside Helen H. Green who also won a seat in 1923, to sit on the Cleveland City Council. Wing ran and won again in 1925 for her city council seat. While on the council, her most documented accomplishment was the establishment of the Women’s Bureau in the police department. In 1927, Wing ran again for reelection, but lost, allegedly as the result of vote tampering.

=== Legal career (1927–1956) ===
In 1926, while serving on the city council and working at the Consumers’ League of Ohio, Wing passed the Ohio bar, allowing her to practice law within the state. After her stint in electoral politics, she applied her new legal credentials to gain the position of executive secretary at the Consumers’ League of Ohio. From this position, she advocated for increased protections for women and children in the workforce. Under Wing's leadership, in 1933 Ohio passed a state minimum wage for women and ratified the federal child-labor amendment, though the amendment’s status is still pending. In 1937, Wing was hired as the first regional attorney for the Ohio, Kentucky, and Michigan region of the Social Security Administration. As regional attorney, she served as counsel to regional Social Security offices. She worked with legislators and lobbyists to tailor their current programs and create new offices, administrative bodies, and programs where necessary in order to fit the new demands of the New Deal. One responsibility which she held during her time as regional attorney was advising the central Social Security office on how to best pressure state and local officials into compliance. Among the non-compliant officials was Ohio governor Martin Davey, whose misappropriation of new Social Security-created positions to political allies and friends caused one of the Administration’s first compliance hearings. Wing was lauded as instrumental in advising this case, and was known as a “hell-raiser” by Jack Tate, then the highest ranking attorney for the Administration, for her aggressive approach to non-compliant cases.

=== Retirement and death ===
In 1956, Wing retired from her legal practice, choosing to focus her energies more casually towards the founding and maintenance of community organizations such as the Community Action Program of Lake County, the Fine Arts Association, the Lake County Committee on Aging, and the Legal Services Association of Lake County. Her partner was Dorothy Smith, a lifetime social worker and fellow employee at the Cleveland Metropolitan YWCA in the 1920s. Smith died in 1976 at 84 years of age, while Wing died in 1982 at 97 years of age. They lived in Mentor, OH and had no children.
