= Helen H. Green =

American politician and temperance activist

Helen H. Green was an American politician and temperance activist. Green and Marie Remington Wing were the first women elected to Cleveland City Council. She was elected to the 4th District as a Republican in 1923, serving until 1927. Green was president of the Cuyahoga County Women’s Christian Temperance Union. She advocated for stronger enforcement of dry laws.
