= Lawrence E. Imhoff =

American politician

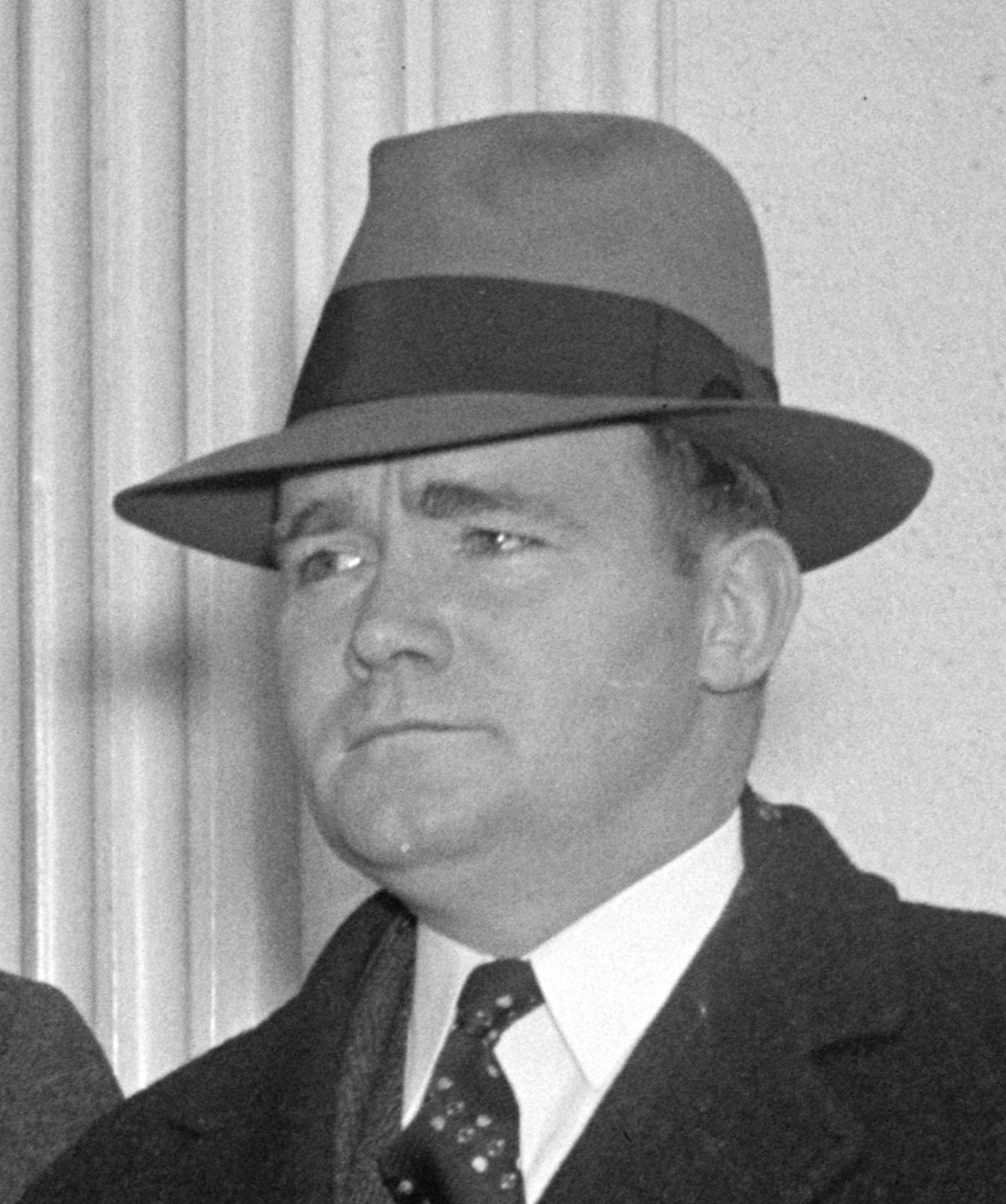
- Leaving White House, March 7, 1938.

Member of the U.S. House of Representatives from Ohio's 18th district
- In office March 4, 1933 – January 3, 1939
- Preceded by: B. Frank Murphy
- Succeeded by: Earl R. Lewis
- In office January 3, 1941 – January 3, 1943
- Preceded by: Earl R. Lewis
- Succeeded by: Earl R. Lewis

Personal details
- Born: December 28, 1895 Belmont County, Ohio, US
- Died: April 18, 1988 (aged 92) North Fort Myers, Florida, US
- Resting place: Fort Myers Memorial Gardens, Fort Myers, Florida
- Party: Democratic
- Spouse: Fay King Imhoff (m. 1950)

Lawrence E. Imhoff (December 28, 1895 – April 18, 1988) was an American soldier, lawyer, and a four-term U.S. Representative from Ohio. He served in Congress from 1933 to 1939 and again from 1941 to 1943.

== Early life and career ==
Born at Round Bottom, Ohio, Imhoff moved to St. Clairsville, Ohio, in 1907. He attended the rural schools and St. Clairsville High School.

=== World War I ===
During the First World War, he enlisted as a private in the Fifth Regiment, United States Marine Corps, and served from August 9, 1917, until honorably discharged on April 1, 1919. He received the Purple Heart Medal.

After the war, Imhoff attended the Ohio State University in Columbus. He served as the clerk of courts for Belmont County, Ohio, from 1921 to 1925. He studied law and was admitted to the bar in January 1930. He served as probate judge of Belmont County 1925–1933.

== Congress ==
Imhoff was elected as a Democrat to the Seventy-third, Seventy-fourth, and Seventy-fifth Congresses (March 4, 1933 – January 3, 1939). He was an unsuccessful candidate for reelection in 1938 to the Seventy-sixth Congress. He served as special assistant to the United States Attorney General in 1939 and 1940.

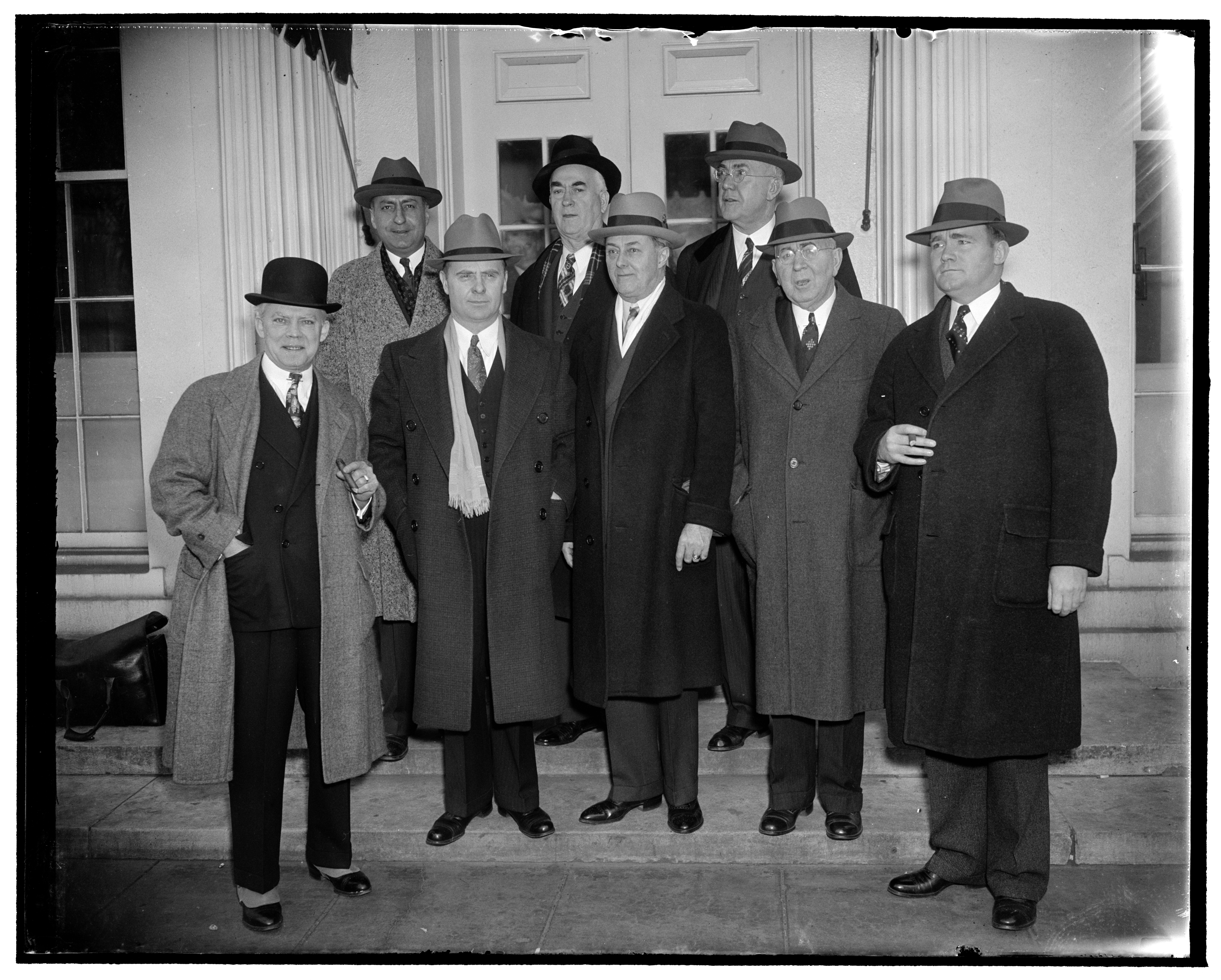
Group of legislators leaves White House after asking Franklin D. Roosevelt for $80,000,000 for flood control in Ohio Valley, March 7, 1938. front: l-r Joseph A. Dixon, James G. Polk, Eugene B. Crowe, G W Johnson, Lawrence E. Imhoff, rear l-r : Peter J. De Muth, Kent E. Keller, Brent Spence.

Imhoff was again elected to the Seventy-seventh Congress (January 3, 1941 – January 3, 1943). He was an unsuccessful candidate for reelection in 1942 to the Seventy-eighth Congress.

== World War II ==
With World War II raging, Imhoff was commissioned as a lieutenant commander in the United States Navy Reserve on January 21, 1943. He was promoted to rank of commander and released from active duty on November 8, 1945.

== Later career and death ==
He was appointed on November 9, 1945, a member of the Board of Veterans' Appeals, Washington, D.C., and retired December 31, 1964.

In 1950, Imhoff married Fay King, who was the White House calligrapher.

He was a resident of North Fort Myers, Florida, until his death there on April 18, 1988.

== Sources ==
- United States Congress. "Lawrence E. Imhoff (id: I000010)". Biographical Directory of the United States Congress.

U.S. House of Representatives
Preceded by B. Frank Murphy	Member of the U.S. House of Representatives from Ohio's 18th congressional district 1933-1939	Succeeded by Earl R. Lewis
Preceded by Earl R. Lewis	Member of the U.S. House of Representatives from Ohio's 18th congressional district 1941-1943	Succeeded by Earl R. Lewis
