= B. Frank Murphy =

American politician (1867–1938)

Benjamin Franklin Murphy
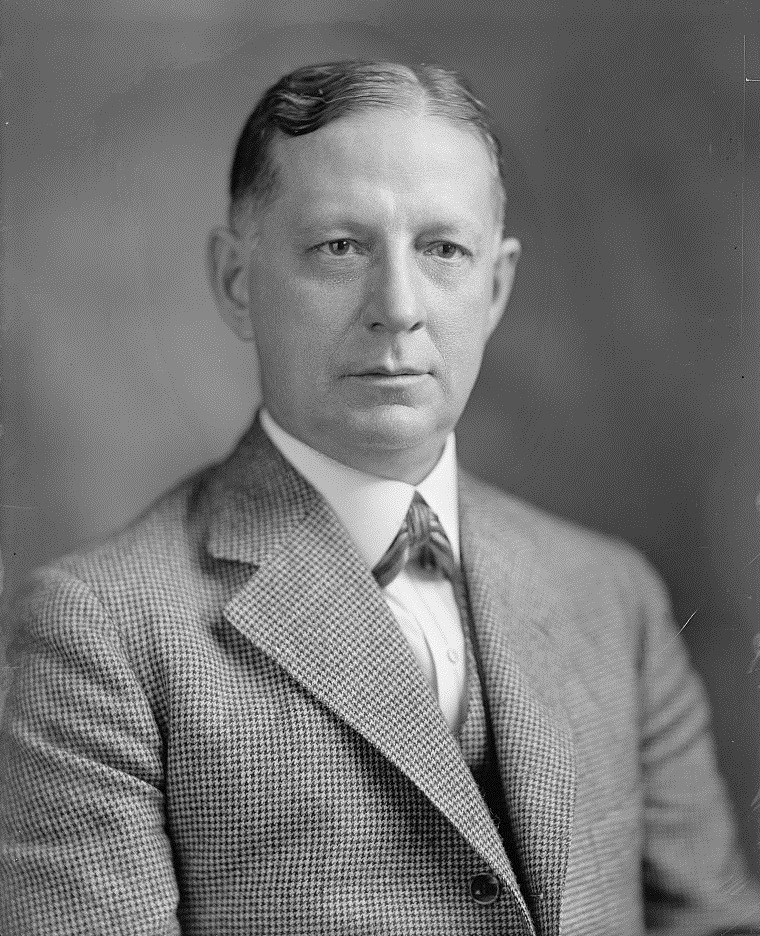

Member of the U.S. House of Representatives from Ohio's 18th district
- In office March 4, 1919 – March 3, 1933
- Preceded by: David Hollingsworth
- Succeeded by: Lawrence E. Imhoff

Personal details
- Born: December 24, 1867 Steubenville, Ohio, US
- Died: March 6, 1938 (aged 70) Takoma Park, Maryland, US
- Resting place: Union Cemetery, Steubenville
- Party: Republican

Benjamin Franklin Murphy (December 24, 1867 – March 6, 1938) was a U.S. representative from Ohio from 1919 to 1933.

== Biography ==
Born in Steubenville, Ohio to Charles F. Murphy and Mary E. (née Beasley) Murphy, he attended the public schools. He learned the glassworker's trade, and later engaged in the retail shoe business, in banking, and in the real estate business. He served as vice president of the Peoples National Bank. During the First World War, Murphy served with YMCA, stationed at Camp Sheridan, Montgomery, Alabama, in 1917 and 1918.

=== Congress ===
Murphy was elected as a Republican to the Sixty-sixth and to the six succeeding Congresses (March 4, 1919 – March 3, 1933). He served as chairman of the Committee on Expenditures in the Department of Commerce (Sixty-seventh Congress). He was an unsuccessful candidate for reelection in 1932 to the Seventy-third Congress and for election in 1934 to the Seventy-fourth Congress.

=== Personal life ===
Murphy was married three times and widowed twice. His second wife, Mame M. née Barcus, died in an automobile accident in Florida in April 1929. About a year later, he married a local divorcee, Marie E. (née Williams) Clerk in Washington, DC. The ceremony took place at her home and was presided over by her brother-in-law, Rev. William Clews.

=== Death ===
Murphy resided in Washington, D.C. He died in Takoma Park, Maryland, March 6, 1938. He was interred in Union Cemetery, Steubenville, Ohio.

== Sources ==
- United States Congress. "B. Frank Murphy (id: M001089)". Biographical Directory of the United States Congress.

U.S. House of Representatives
Preceded by David Hollingsworth	Member of the U.S. House of Representatives from Ohio's 18th congressional district 1919-1933	Succeeded by Lawrence E. Imhoff
