= Earl Ramage Lewis =

American politician

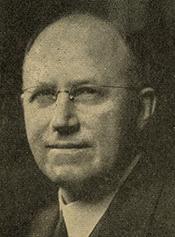

Member of the U.S. House of Representatives from Ohio's 18th district
- In office January 3, 1939 – January 3, 1941
- Preceded by: Lawrence E. Imhoff
- Succeeded by: Lawrence E. Imhoff
- In office January 3, 1943 – January 3, 1949
- Preceded by: Lawrence E. Imhoff
- Succeeded by: Wayne Hays

Member of the Ohio Senate
- In office 1927–1928; 1931–1934

Personal details
- Born: February 22, 1887 Lamira, Ohio
- Died: February 1, 1956 (aged 68) Wheeling, West Virginia
- Resting place: Union Cemetery, St. Clairsville
- Party: Republican
- Education: Muskingum College; Western Reserve University School of Law

Earl Ramage Lewis (February 22, 1887 – February 1, 1956) was an American lawyer and politician who served four terms as a U.S. representative from Ohio.

== Biography ==
Born in Lamira, Ohio, Lewis attended the public and high schools. He graduated from Muskingum College in New Concord, Ohio, in 1911, and from the law department of Western Reserve University, Cleveland, Ohio, in 1914. He was admitted to the bar the same year and commenced practice in St. Clairsville, Ohio.

He served as member of the Ohio State Senate in 1927 and 1928, and then served as chairman of the Republican State campaign committee for Ohio in 1930. Continuing in politics, Lewis returned to the Ohio senate in 1931 and stayed until 1934, serving as president pro tempore in 1931 and 1932 and as Republican floor leader from 1931 to 1934. He also served as member of the Interstate Commission on Conflicting Taxation of the American Legislators Association from 1931 to 1935.

After his time in the Ohio senate, Lewis was elected as a Republican to the Seventy-sixth Congress (January 3, 1939 – January 3, 1941). After his unsuccessful run for reelection in 1940, he resumed the practice of law, but soon ran again. Lewis was elected to the Seventy-eighth, Seventy-ninth, and Eightieth Congresses (January 3, 1943 – January 3, 1949). He was an unsuccessful candidate for reelection in 1948, and again resumed the practice of law.

Lewis later served as trustee of Muskingum College. He died in Wheeling, West Virginia, and was interred in Union Cemetery in St. Clairsville, Ohio.

== Sources ==
- United States Congress. "Earl Ramage Lewis (id: L000279)". Biographical Directory of the United States Congress.

U.S. House of Representatives
Preceded by Lawrence E. Imhoff	Member of the U.S. House of Representatives from Ohio's 18th congressional district 1939-1941	Succeeded by Lawrence E. Imhoff
Preceded by Lawrence E. Imhoff	Member of the U.S. House of Representatives from Ohio's 18th congressional district 1943-1949	Succeeded by Wayne Hays
