= Ezra Dean =

American politician (1795–1872)

Member of the U.S. House of Representatives from Ohio's 18th district
- In office March 4, 1841 – March 3, 1845
- Preceded by: David A. Starkweather
- Succeeded by: David A. Starkweather

Personal details
- Born: April 9, 1795 Hillsdale, New York, U.S.
- Died: January 25, 1872 (aged 76) Ironton, Ohio, U.S.
- Resting place: Woodland Cemetery
- Party: Democratic
- Occupation: Politician; lawyer; judge

Ezra Dean (April 9, 1795 – January 25, 1872) was an American politician, lawyer and judge who served two terms as a U.S. representative from Ohio from 1841 to 1845.

== Early life ==
Ezra Dean was born on April 9, 1795, in Hillsdale, New York. Dean attended common schools.

== Career ==
In the War of 1812, he was appointed ensign of the 11th Infantry Regiment on April 17, 1814, by Secretary of War William Eustis. He was commissioned as a lieutenant on October 1, 1814, as recognition for meritorious conduct at the sortie of Fort Erie. He was present at the battles of Bridgewater and Chippawa. At the close of the war, he was placed in command of a revenue cutter on Lake Champlain. He served in that role for two years before resigning. He was then assigned as a member of the corps of government engineers running a boundary line between Maine and New Brunswick for about one year.

He resigned the military to study law with an attorney in Vermont. He was admitted to the bar in Plattsburgh, New York, in 1823. He settled in Wooster, Ohio, in 1824 and commenced the practice of law.

He was appointed postmaster of Wooster in 1828 by President Andrew Jackson. He served until 1832. He was elected judge of the court of common pleas; serving from 1834 to 1841. Dean was elected as a Democrat to the Twenty-seventh and Twenty-eighth Congresses (March 4, 1841 – March 4, 1845). He served as chairman of the committee on the militia (Twenty-eighth Congress). He was not a candidate for re-nomination in 1844. After serving, he resumed the practice of law in Wooster. He partnered with John McSweeney.

== Personal life ==
Dean had a son E. V. Dean.

He moved to Ironton, Ohio, in 1867. He died in Ironton on January 25, 1872. He was interred in Woodland Cemetery.

== Sources ==
- United States Congress. "Ezra Dean (id: D000171)". Biographical Directory of the United States Congress.

U.S. House of Representatives
Preceded by David A. Starkweather	Member of the U.S. House of Representatives from Ohio's 18th congressional district March 4, 1841 – March 3, 1845	Succeeded by David A. Starkweather
