= John F. Morse =

American politician (1801–1884)

John Flavel Morse (October 1, 1801–January 30, 1884) was a politician in the U.S. State of Ohio who was Speaker of the Ohio House of Representatives 1850–1851.

== Biography ==
John F. Morse was born in Massachusetts, October 1, 1801 and moved with his father to Kirtland, Ohio in 1816. In 1824 he started farming and building for himself. In 1836 he moved to Painsville, where he was exclusively a builder.

Morse was elected to represent Lake County in the Ohio House of Representatives in 1843 for the 42nd General Assembly, and again in 1848 and 1850 for the 47th and 49th General Assemblies. In the 49th General Assembly, he was elected Speaker of the House, In the 47th, he was important to the election of Salmon P. Chase to the United States Senate, and to the repeal of some laws that restricted the civil rights of Black People, known as the Black Laws.

Morse was elected to the Ohio State Senate in 1859 for the 54th General Assembly, (1860–1861), and in 1861 was Captain of the 29th Ohio Infantry. In 1862, Secretary Chase offered him employment with the Federal Government, continuing until 1876. He died in 1884

In July, 1824, Morse married Mary Granger, of Vienna, New York, and had two children.

== Notes ==
Ohio House of Representatives
Preceded by Benjamin F. Leiter	Speaker of the House; 1850-1851	Succeeded by James C. Johnson
Preceded by Simeon Fuller	Representative from Lake County; 1843-1844	Succeeded by Abel Kimball
Preceded by Abel Kimball	Representative from Lake County; 1848-1849; Served alongside: Norman L. Chaffee	Succeeded by C.W. Ensign; Henry Krum
Preceded by C.W. Ensign; Henry Krum	Representative from Lake County; 1850-1851; Served alongside: Samuel Plumb	Succeeded by Dexter Damon
Ohio Senate
Preceded by Darius Cadwell	Senator from 24th District; 1860-1861	Succeeded by Peter Hitchcock
