= Benjamin Jones (Ohio politician) =

American politician

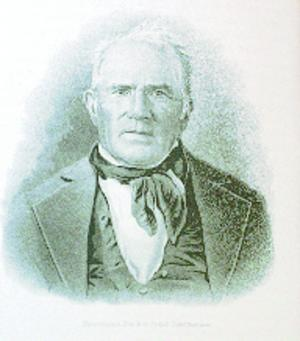

Member of the U.S. House of Representatives from Ohio's 18th district
- In office March 4, 1833 – March 3, 1837
- Preceded by: new district
- Succeeded by: Matthias Shepler

Member of the Ohio House of Representatives from the Wayne County district
- In office December 3, 1821 – December 1, 1822
- Preceded by: Jacob Barker
- Succeeded by: Cyrus Spink

Member of the Ohio Senate from the Wayne County district
- In office December 7, 1829 – December 2, 1832
- Preceded by: Joseph H. Larwill
- Succeeded by: Thomas Robinson

Personal details
- Born: April 13, 1787 Winchester, Virginia
- Died: April 24, 1861 (aged 74) Wooster, Ohio
- Resting place: Oak Hil Cemetery, Wooster, Ohio
- Party: Democratic

Benjamin Jones (April 13, 1787 – April 24, 1861) was a U.S. representative from Ohio for two terms from 1833 to 1837.

== Biography ==
Born in Winchester, Virginia, Jones moved with his parents to Washington, Pennsylvania. He received a limited schooling. He learned the trade of cabinetmaking. He moved to Wooster, Ohio, in 1812 and engaged in mercantile pursuits. He was a Justice of the Peace in 1815, and commissioner for Wayne County in 1818. He served in the Ohio House of Representatives in 1821–1822, and in the Ohio Senate from 1829 to 1832. Ohio Presidential elector in 1828 for Andrew Jackson.

=== Congress ===
Jones was elected as a Democrat to the Twenty-third and Twenty-fourth Congresses (March 4, 1833 – March 3, 1837). He served as chairman of the Committee on Expenditures in the Department of War in the Twenty-fourth Congress. He was not a candidate for renomination.

=== Later career and death ===
He resumed business interests in Wooster, and died there April 24, 1861. He was interred in Oak Hill Cemetery.

== Sources ==
- United States Congress. "Benjamin Jones (id: J000212)". Biographical Directory of the United States Congress.
- Taylor, William Alexander; Taylor, Aubrey Clarence (1899). Ohio statesmen and annals of progress: from the year 1788 to the year 1900 ... Vol. 1. State of Ohio. p. 145.

U.S. House of Representatives
Preceded by District created	Member of the U.S. House of Representatives from Ohio's 18th congressional district March 4, 1833 – March 3, 1837	Succeeded by Matthias Shepler
