= Darius Cadwell =

American lawyer and Republican Party politician (1821–1905)

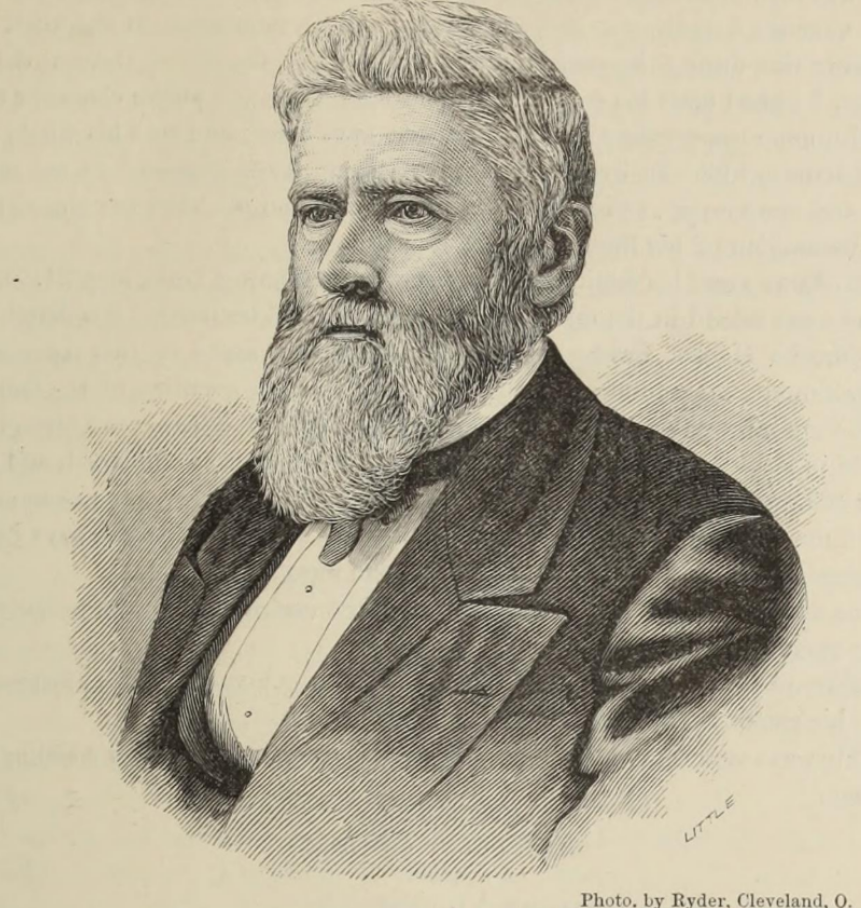
- Depiction of Cadwell in an 1878 book

Member of the Ohio Senate for the 24th District
- In office January 4, 1858 – January 2, 1860
- Preceded by: Lester Taylor
- Succeeded by: John F. Morse

Member of the Ohio House of Representatives for Ashtabula County
- In office January 7, 1856 – January 4, 1858 Serving with Uriah Hawkins
- Preceded by: John J. Elwell
- Succeeded by: William S. Deming

Judge of the Ohio Courts of Common Pleas
- In office 1874–1884

Personal details
- Born: April 13, 1821 Andover, Ohio, U.S.
- Died: November 26, 1905 (aged 84) Cleveland, Ohio, U.S.
- Political party: Republican
- Spouse: Ann Eliza Watrous (m. 1847)
- Children: 4

Darius Cadwell (April 13, 1821 – November 26, 1905) was an American lawyer, judge and politician who served as a Republican state legislator for Ohio and one of its provosts marshal during the Civil War.

Born to a prominent farmer, Cadwell read law under his relative and future Senator Benjamin Wade and became a prominent local lawyer and minor politician in Ashtabula County. He was successively elected to both chambers of the Ohio General Assembly as a Republican. After a row in 1857 he was punched by fellow member John P. Slough in an incident leading to the latter's expulsion. Cadwell served as provost marshal during the Civil War, when he moved to Cleveland, and spent the remainder of his life in private practice and as an elected judge of common pleas.

== Early life and legal career ==
Cadwell was born in Andover, Ohio on April 13, 1821. He was the second son of Caroline Darius and the farmer and pioneer Roger Cadwell, the latter of whom having emigrated from Hartford County, Connecticut on July 10, 1817. His other siblings were Emily, Jonathan and James D. Ray, a realtor who profited during the Duluth, Minnesota land boom. (Note: Williams's history contradicts itself between pages 93 and 216, citing Roger Cadwell's Connecticut residence as either Bloomfield or Farmington, and then, by attributing eight children to him in Connecticut with three sons born at Andover. The latter case may be a conflation of two distinct persons, as if it were true it would make Darius the third son.) Cadwell attended local schools before studying one year at Allegheny College in Meadville, Pennsylvania in 1841.

Cadwell began reading law in February 1842 at the Jefferson, Ohio law firm Messrs. Wade & Ranney, composed of Cadwell's relative and future Senator Benjamin Wade (Wade's brother Samuel Sidney having married Darius's sister Emily in 1821) and future Ohio Supreme Court justice Rufus P. Ranney. He was admitted to the bar in September 1844 and joined the firm as a partner. The state legislature elected Wade president-judge of the third judicial district in 1847, so Cadwell and Ranney created a new firm with Charles S. Simonds. Wade and Cadwell remained in correspondence, with Cadwell apparently even writing a flattering monograph about the former's legal competence. When Ranney then left in 1851 following his election to the Supreme Court of Ohio, "Messrs. Cadwell & Simonds" continued practicing together until autumn 1871.

== Political career, the Civil War and after ==
Cadwell was said to be diligent, active and able as an attorney, and popular in the community. He occupied a number of minor political offices, including alderman, deputy clerk, recorder (1847–1850) and trustee (1852–1855) for the then-hamlet of Jefferson, and census agent for Ashtabula County in the 1850 census. From 1856 to 1858, he served two terms with Uriah Hawkins as a Republican member of the Ohio House of Representatives for Ashtabula County. Cadwell then served for two terms in the Ohio Senate for the 24th district, encompassing Ashtabula, Lake and Geauga Counties from 1858 to 1860. Cadwell was an abolitionist, who reportedly "once thanked God that in Ohio public sentiment recognized negroes as the social and political equals of the whites" — among his personal papers are a bill to abolish imprisonment for debt and other documents opposing slavery and President Polk in 1848.

=== Altercation with John P. Slough ===
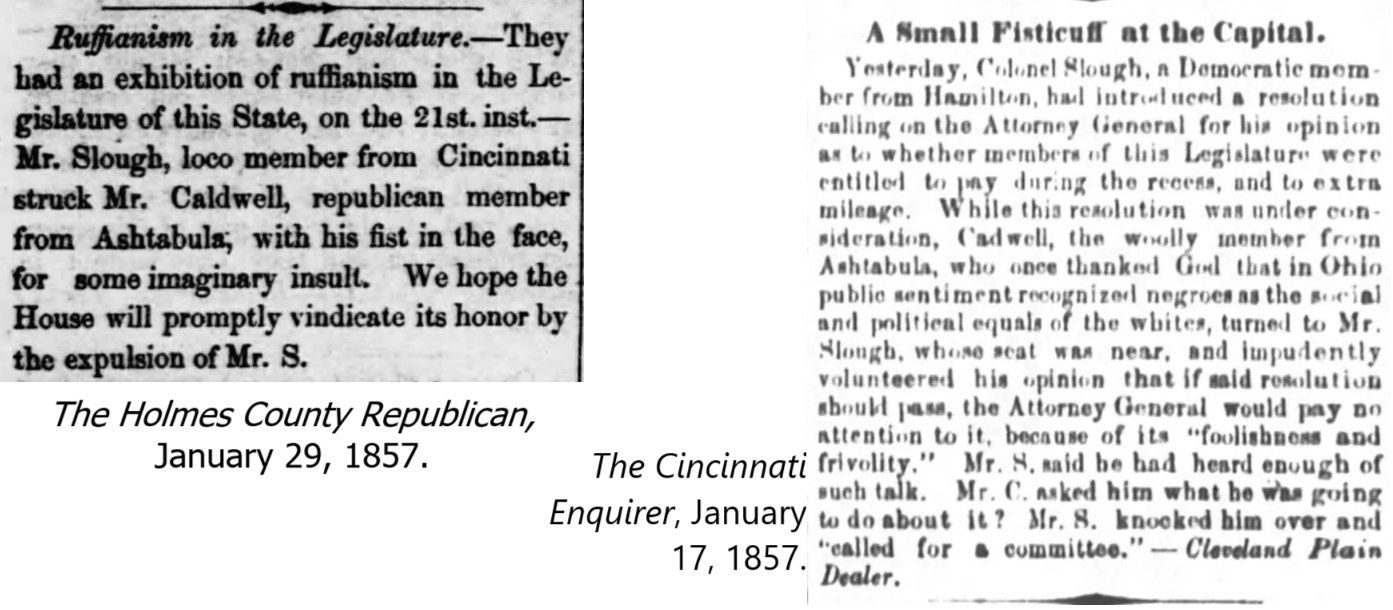
Different partisan takes on the altercation by The Holmes County Republican and The Cincinnati Enquirer.

On January 14, 1857, Cadwell engaged in a debate with fellow lawyer and Cincinnati Democrat John P. Slough over the latter's bill to compensate members for per diem expenses incurred during the time spent adjourned. During the roll call for the vote, Cadwell approached Slough, with whom he had previously a cordial relationship, and told him the bill was "too foolish" to trouble the Attorney General with. In response, Slough said he wouldn't be disrespected any longer, and punched Cadwell in the face; Cadwell did not retaliate, and Slough, refusing to apologize, became the first and only member expelled from the Ohio General Assembly until Larry Householder in 2021. Slough was subsequently renominated by local Democrats, but the next year's election between him and Republican businessman Robert Hosea was incredibly close. Amidst the confusion, Slough returned to Columbus triumphant, only for the House Committee on Elections, on which Cadwell served, to demand recounts in certain wards where mistakes were reported. After the recounts, Hosea was found to have won after all. Slough conceded, moved west and apparently never returned to Ohio. At a time of great political violence, echoing the 1856 caning of Charles Sumner, newspapers described the incident in colorful language as a cause célèbre.

=== Civil War and subsequent work ===
In 1862, Cadwell turned down an Army captaincy appointment but accepted in 1863 the position of provost marshal for the 19th district to oversee compliance with the Enrollment Act, headquartered in Youngstown, Ohio. In autumn 1865, the district was consolidated with the 14th, 16th and the notoriously poorly managed 18th, and its headquarters was relocated to Cleveland. He was responsible for winding up the operations of the 18th, 19th and 20th districts before being himself discharged on December 20.

From 1865 to 1870, Cadwell apparently aided the Wade family and other Ohioans purchasing land in Duluth through his brother. In autumn 1871, Cadwell opened a law office in Cleveland. In 1873, he was elected judge of common pleas for Cuyahoga County and served two terms from 1874 to 1884. He also was a founding member of the Cleveland Law Library, serving as trustee (1881–1891), vice-president (1884–1891) and auditor (1891) thereof. Cadwell spent his final years in private practice with his son, Frank.

== Personal life ==
On April 13, 1847, Cadwell married Ann Elizabeth 'Eliza' Watrous (b. 1826), the daughter of John B. Watrous (d. 1862), a veteran of the War of 1812. Together they had four children, two of whom (Florence and James R.) died aged three and eleven, respectively. The other children were Clara Gertrude (b. 1855), who in 1886 married the businessman Richard W. Hubbard, and a Frank W.

Cadwell died in Cleveland on November 26, 1905. A number of his papers, including official and personal correspondence, were purchased in 1969 by the Western Reserve Historical Society.

== Notes ==
Ohio Senate
Preceded by Lester Taylor	Senator for the 24th District; 1858–1860	Succeeded by John F. Morse
Ohio House of Representatives
Preceded by John J. Elwell	Representative for Ashtabula County; 1856–1858; Served alongside: Uriah Hawkins	Succeeded by William S. Deming
