= William B. Francis =

American politician (1860–1954)

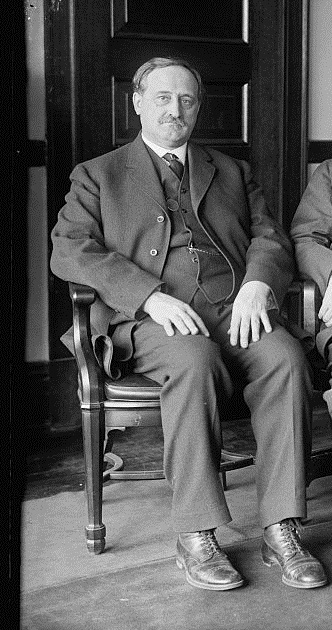
- circa 1914

Member of the U.S. House of Representatives from Ohio's 16th district
- In office March 4, 1911 – March 4, 1915
- Preceded by: David Hollingsworth
- Succeeded by: Roscoe C. McCulloch

Personal details
- Born: William Bates Francis; October 25, 1860 Jefferson County, Ohio, U.S.
- Died: December 5, 1954 (aged 94) Wheeling, West Virginia, U.S.
- Resting place: Mount Pleasant Cemetery, Mount Pleasant, Ohio
- Party: Democratic

William Bates Francis (October 25, 1860 – December 5, 1954) was an American lawyer and politician who served two terms as a U.S. representative from Ohio for two terms from 1911 to 1915.

== Early life and career ==
Born near Updegraff, Ohio, Francis attended the public schools. He studied law, and was admitted to the bar in 1889 and commenced practice in Martins Ferry, Ohio. He was city solicitor in 1897, 1898, and 1900. He served as member of the board of school examiners of Martins Ferry from 1903 to 1908. He served as delegate to the Democratic National Convention in 1904, and as member of the board of education of Martins Ferry from 1908 to 1914.

== Congress ==
Francis was elected as a Democrat to the Sixty-second and Sixty-third Congresses (March 4, 1911 – March 4, 1915). He was an unsuccessful candidate for reelection in 1914 to the Sixty-fourth Congress.

== Later career ==
He resumed the practice of his profession and served as chairman of the Ohio State Civil Service 1931 to 1935. Supervisor of properties for aid to aged, until his retirement. Resided in Martins Ferry and later in St. Clairsville, Ohio, until his death.

== Death ==
He died in Wheeling, West Virginia, December 5, 1954 and was interred in Mount Pleasant Cemetery, Mount Pleasant, Ohio.

== Sources ==
- United States Congress. "William B. Francis (id: F000337)". Biographical Directory of the United States Congress.

U.S. House of Representatives
Preceded by David Hollingsworth	Member of the U.S. House of Representatives from Ohio's 16th congressional district 1911-1915	Succeeded by Roscoe C. McCulloch
