= David A. Starkweather =

American lawyer and politician (1802–1876)

David Austin Starkweather
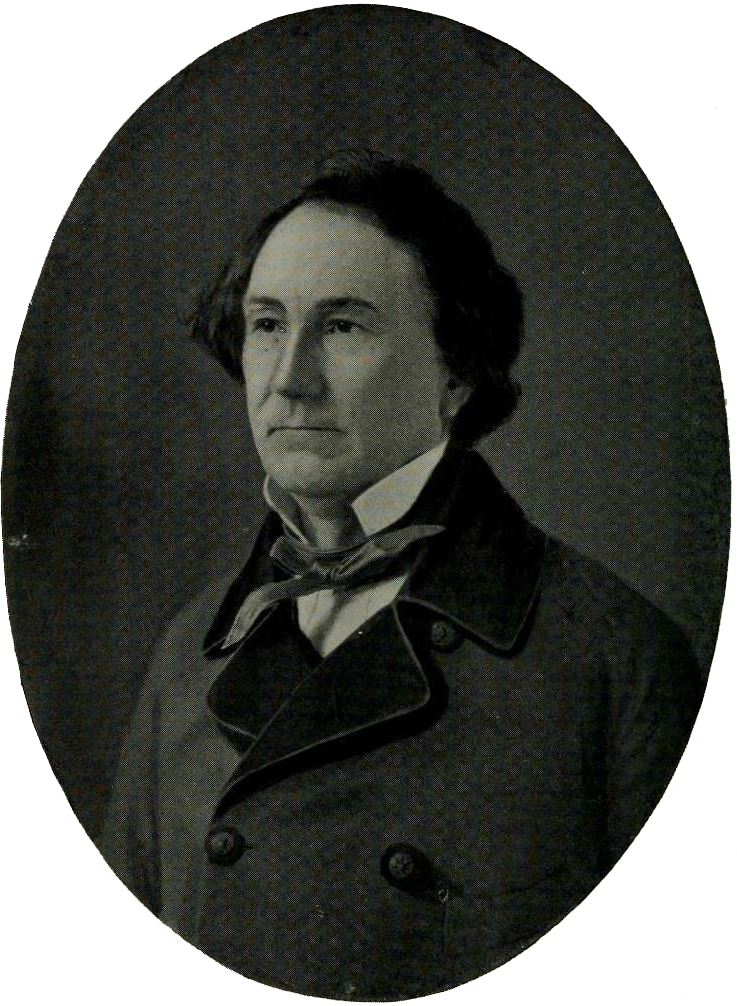
- Starkweather in 1904 publication

Member of the U.S. House of Representatives from Ohio's 18th district
- In office March 4, 1839 – March 3, 1841
- Preceded by: Matthias Shepler
- Succeeded by: Ezra Dean
- In office March 4, 1845 – March 3, 1847
- Preceded by: Ezra Dean
- Succeeded by: Samuel Lahm

8th United States Ambassador to Chile
- In office November 22, 1854 – August 26, 1857
- Appointed by: Franklin Pierce
- Preceded by: Balie Peyton
- Succeeded by: John Bigler

Member of the Ohio House of Representatives from the Stark County district
- In office December 2, 1833 – December 6, 1835 Serving with John Brown
- Preceded by: Thomas Blackburn; John Grubb
- Succeeded by: Thomas Blackburn; H. Stidger

Member of the Ohio Senate from the Stark County district
- In office December 5, 1836 – December 2, 1838
- Preceded by: Matthias Shepler
- Succeeded by: Jacob Hostetter Jr.

Personal details
- Born: January 21, 1802 Preston, Connecticut, U.S.
- Died: July 12, 1876 (aged 74) Cleveland, Ohio, U.S.
- Party: Democratic
- Children: 4
- Education: Williams College

David Austin Starkweather (January 21, 1802 – July 12, 1876) was an American lawyer and politician who was a U.S. representative from Ohio and a U.S. diplomat. He served two non-consecutive terms in the U.S. House of Representatives in the mid-19th century and was United States Ambassador to Chile during the presidency of Franklin Pierce.

== Early life and career ==
Starkweather was born in Preston, Connecticut on January 21, 1802. He graduated from Williams College and studied law with his brother in Cooperstown, New York. He was admitted to the bar in 1825, establishing a practice in Mansfield, Ohio. He located in Canton, Ohio in 1828.

== Political career ==
He was a judge in one of the higher courts in Stark County, Ohio. He was a member of the Ohio House of Representatives from 1833 to 1835, and a member of the Ohio Senate from 1836 to 1838. He was a representative of the Democrats in Congress from Ohio from 1839 to 1841 and again from 1845 to 1847. In his first term, he was a member of the Committee on Roads and Canals, and a member of the Committee on Invalid Pensions the second term. He was chosen a presidential elector in 1848 for Cass/Butler, and served as U.S. envoy to Chile from 1854 to 1857. He lost election to Ohio's 18th congressional district in 1860.

== Death ==
Starkweather died of paralysis at the home of his daughter, Mrs. Brinsmade, in Cleveland, Ohio, July 12, 1876. He had three daughters and one son.

U.S. House of Representatives
Preceded by Matthias Shepler	Member of the U.S. House of Representatives from Ohio's 18th congressional district 4 March 1839–3 March 1841	Succeeded by Ezra Dean
Preceded by Ezra Dean	Member of the U.S. House of Representatives from Ohio's 18th congressional district 4 March 1845–3 March 1847	Succeeded by Samuel Lahm
Diplomatic posts
Preceded by Balie Peyton	United States Envoy to Chile; 22 November 1854–26 August 1857	Succeeded by John Bigler
Ohio House of Representatives
Preceded by Thomas Blackburn; John Grubb	Representative from Stark County; December 2, 1833 – December 6, 1835; Served alongside: John Brown	Succeeded by Thomas Blackburn; H. Stidger
Ohio Senate
Preceded by Matthias Shepler	Senator from Stark County District; December 5, 1836 – December 2, 1838	Succeeded by Jacob Hostetter Jr.
