= Gavers, Ohio =

Unincorporated community in Ohio, U.S.

Coordinates: 40°42′25″N 80°48′20″W

Gavers is an unincorporated community in Columbiana County, in the U.S. state of Ohio.

== History ==
The community was named for Gideon Gaver, a pioneer settler. A post office called Gavers was established in 1848, and remained in operation until 1902. Besides the post office, Gavers had a country store.
