= Samuel Krider =

American politician (1811–1892)

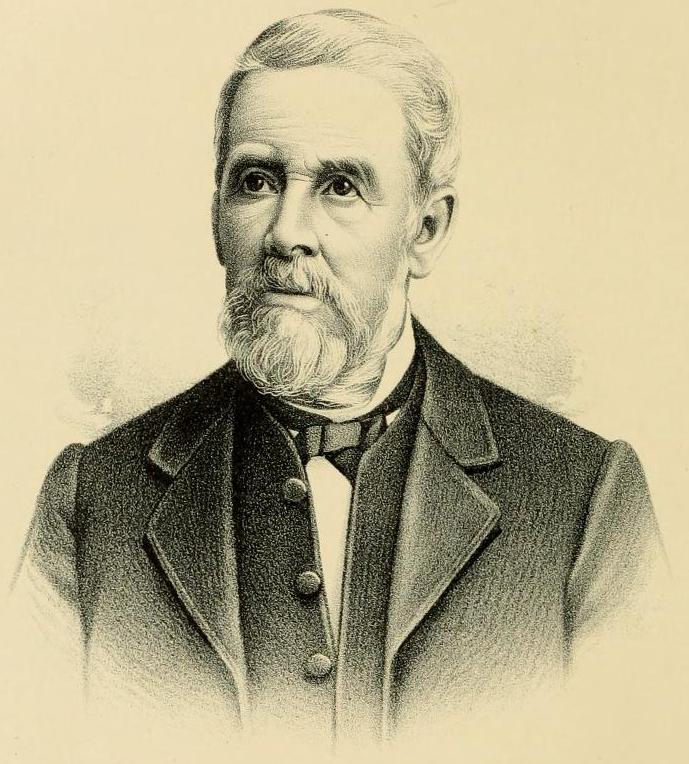
- Krider in 1892 publication

Member of the Ohio House of Representatives from the Stark County district
- In office 1850–1854 Serving with Jacob W. Smith
- Preceded by: Benjamin F. Leiter
- Succeeded by: Jacob W. Smith and John H. L. Scott

Personal details
- Born: January 23, 1811 Franklin County, Pennsylvania, U.S.
- Died: June 6, 1892 (aged 81)
- Resting place: West Brookfield Cemetery
- Party: Democratic
- Spouse: Anna Augustine (m. 1835)
- Children: 3
- Occupation: Politician; tailor

Samuel Krider (January 23, 1811 – June 6, 1892) was an American politician and tailor from Ohio. He served as a member of the Ohio House of Representatives from 1850 to 1851 and 1852 to 1854.

== Early life ==
Samuel Krider was born on January 23, 1811, in Franklin County, Pennsylvania, to Fannie (née Hoover) and George Krider. His mother was from Swiss ancestry and his father was from German ancestry. In 1819, his family moved to Tuscarawas Township, Stark County, Ohio. He was educated in district schools in the area.

== Career ==
At 19, Krider moved to Chambersburg, Pennsylvania, and learned the trade of tailor. He remained there until 1832 when he returned to Ohio to work as a tailor. In 1836, he moved to his house. He worked as a tailor until his death.

Krider was a Democrat. He served as a member of the Ohio House of Representatives, representing Stark County from 1850 to 1851 and from 1852 to 1854.

Krider helped organize and served as the director of the Stark County Agricultural Society. He served as justice of the peace in Tuscarawas County from 1864 to his death. He was a member of the board of education of Tuscarawas Township for 30 years.

== Personal life ==
Krider married Anna Augustine, daughter of Andrew Augustine, on November 26, 1835. They had three children, Benjamin F., Charles A. and Silas W. His son Charles served as sheriff of Stark County. He was a member of the Reformed Church.

Krider died on June 6, 1892. He was buried at West Brookfield Cemetery.
