= Samuel Hemphill =

Irish Anglican priest

Samuel Hemphill (5 July 1859 – 12 January 1927) was an Anglican priest in Ireland. He was born in Springhill, Killenaule, County Tipperary. He was the son of Robert Hemphill of Springhill, Killenaule and Annette Sarah, daughter of Samuel Alleyne Rothwell, of Newtown County Meath.

Hemphill was born in Clonmel and educated at Trinity College, Dublin. He was ordained deacon in 1883 and priest in 1885. His first post was a curacy at Holy Trinity, Rathmines.

He was Rector of Westport, County Mayo from 1888 to 1892; and of Birr, County Offaly from 1892 to 1914. He was Professor of Biblical Greek at Trinity College from 1888 to 1898. He was later Rector of Drumbeg, County Down; and Archdeacon of Down from 1923 until his death. He was also an Honorary Canon of Killaloe Cathedral and St Patricks Cathedral, Dublin; Examining Chaplain to the Bishop of Killaloe, the Archbishop of Armagh and the Bishop of Down; Chancellor of Christchurch Cathedral, Dublin and Treasurer of Down Cathedral.

He died in the vestry of his church in Drumbeg, County Down before a wedding.

He was married to Flora (nee Delap) and had seven children including Robert, Elizabeth, Richard Patrick, Alexander, Margaret, Annette and Flora.

== Works ==
- The Diatessaron of Tatian, 1888
- The Literature of the 2nd Century, 1891
- My Neighbour, 1897
- The Satires of Persius translated, 1900
- Immortality in Christ, 1904
- A History of the Revised Version of the New Testament, 1906

== Arms ==
Coat of arms of Samuel Hemphill
Notes Confirmed by Sir Arthur Vicars, Ulster King of Arms, 12 December 1907. Crest On a wreath of the colours a cubit arm erect vambraced Or charged with two chevronels Azure the hand grasping a short sword Proper. Escutcheon Per fess Or and Argent on a fess engrailed between two lions' head erased countourne Azure three estoiles of the second. Motto Virtus In Arduis
