= Hostetter =

Hostetter may refer to:

== People ==
- Adam Hostetter (born 1974), American snowboarder
- Amos Hostetter Jr. (born 1937), American businessman
- Carl F. Hostetter, American writer
- David Hostetter (1819–1888), American businessman and banker
- Jacob Hostetter (1754–1831), a member of the U.S. House of Representatives from Pennsylvania
- Jacob Hostetter Jr. (died 1868), American politician from Ohio
- John Hostetter (1946–2016), American actor
- Iris Adrian Hostetter (1912–1994), American actress
- Paul Hostetter, American conductor
- Theodore R. Hostetter (1870–1902), American heir, businessman, polo player and yachtsman

== Other ==
- Hostetter, Pennsylvania, a census-designated place
- Hostetter Inn, lodging near Lisbon, Ohio
- Hostetter station, a light rail station
