= George Bliss (Ohio politician) =

American politician

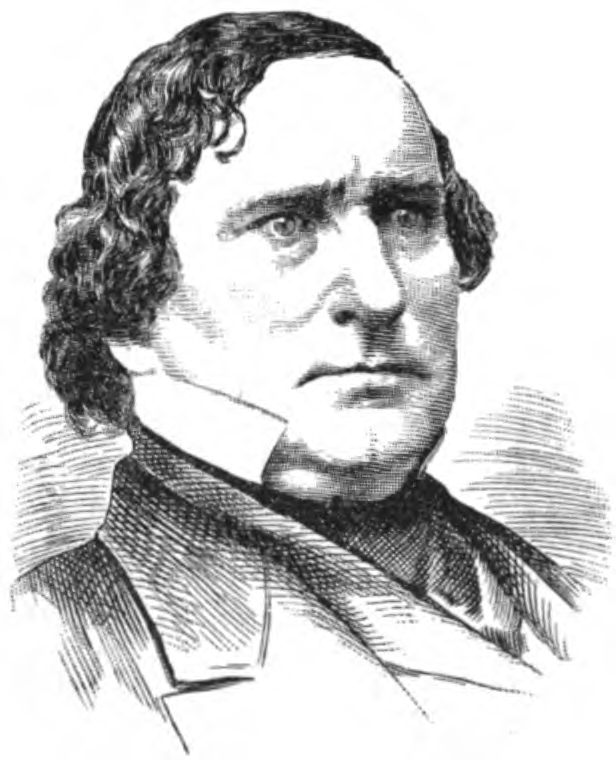

Member of the U.S. House of Representatives from Ohio
- In office March 4, 1853 – March 3, 1855
- Preceded by: David K. Cartter
- Succeeded by: Benjamin F. Leiter
- Constituency: 18th district
- In office March 4, 1863 – March 3, 1865
- Preceded by: Harrison G. O. Blake
- Succeeded by: Martin Welker
- Constituency: 14th district

Personal details
- Born: January 1, 1813 Jericho, Vermont, U.S.
- Died: October 24, 1868 (aged 55) Wooster, Ohio, U.S.
- Resting place: Oak Hill Cemetery
- Party: Democratic
- Spouse: Sarah J. Fish
- Children: 5
- Education: Granville College

George Bliss (January 1, 1813 – October 24, 1868) was a member of the United States House of Representatives from Ohio for two non-consecutive terms in the 1850s and 1860s.

== Early life ==
George Bliss was born on January 1, 1813, in Jericho, Vermont. He graduated from Granville College. He moved to Ohio in 1832 or 1833. He studied law with David Kellogg Cartter. He was admitted to the bar in 1841 and became Cartter's law partner in Akron, Ohio.

== Career ==
Bliss was Mayor of Akron in 1850. In 1850, Governor Reuben Wood appointed Bliss as presiding judge of the eighth judicial district, replacing Benjamin Wade and continued in that role until the office was discontinued after a constitutional change.

Bliss was elected to the Thirty-third Congress (March 4, 1853 – March 3, 1855) as a Democrat, defeating Free Soiler Darius Lyman. Bliss subsequently withdrew his nomination for re-election in 1855. He continued practising law in Wooster, Ohio. He formed a partnership with John McSweeney. In 1858, he was principal counsel and attorney in the Oberlin–Wellington Rescue case, assisting George Belden of Canton, the United States District Attorney for the Northern District of Ohio, in the prosecution. Both conspirators were found guilty by the jury in the court of judge Hiram V. Willson, and punished.

Bliss was elected to the Thirty-eighth congress (March 4, 1863 – March 3, 1865) and was an unsuccessful candidate for re-election in 1864. He was a delegate to the Union National Convention at Philadelphia, Pennsylvania in 1866.

== Death ==
Bliss married Sarah J. Fish of Williamstown, New York, and they had one daughter and four sons. After Bliss died, his family moved to Brooklyn, New York.

Bliss died in Wooster on October 24, 1868. He was buried in Oak Hill Cemetery.

== Sources ==
- United States Congress. "George Bliss (id: B000559)". Biographical Directory of the United States Congress.

U.S. House of Representatives
Preceded by David K. Cartter	Member of the U.S. House of Representatives from Ohio's 18th congressional district 1853-1855	Succeeded by Benjamin F. Leiter
Preceded by Harrison G. O. Blake	Member of the U.S. House of Representatives from Ohio's 14th congressional district 1863-1865	Succeeded by Martin Welker
