= David Kellogg Cartter =

American judge

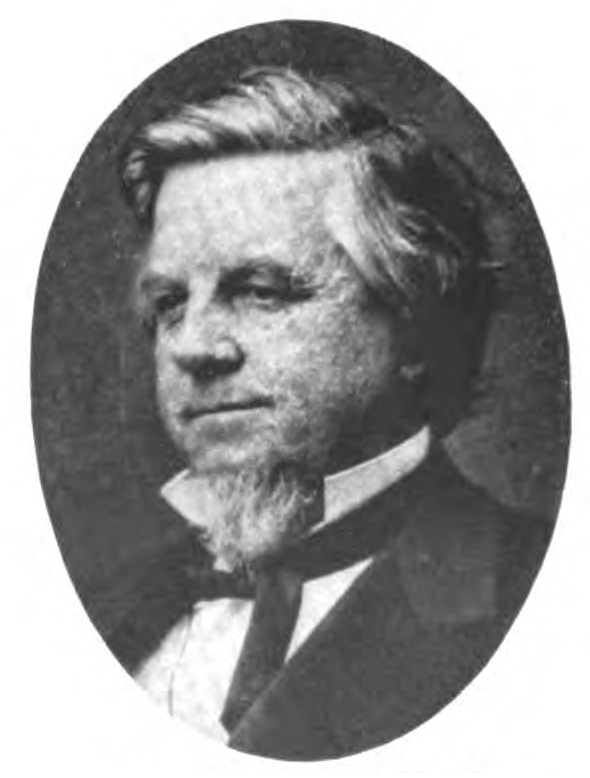

Chief Justice of the Supreme Court of the District of Columbia
- In office March 11, 1863 – April 16, 1887
- Appointed by: Abraham Lincoln
- Preceded by: Seat established by 12 Stat. 762
- Succeeded by: Edward Franklin Bingham

Minister Resident of the United States to Bolivia
- In office March 27, 1861 – March 10, 1862
- Appointed by: Abraham Lincoln
- Preceded by: John Cotton Smith
- Succeeded by: Alen A. Hall

Member of the U.S. House of Representatives from Ohio's 18th district
- In office March 4, 1849 – March 3, 1853
- Preceded by: Samuel Lahm
- Succeeded by: George Bliss

Personal details
- Born: David Kellogg Cartter; June 22, 1812 Jefferson County, New York, US
- Died: April 16, 1887 (aged 74) Washington, D.C., US
- Resting place: Lake View Cemetery; Cleveland, Ohio, US
- Party: Democratic (before 1860); Republican (from 1860)
- Education: read law

David Kellogg Cartter (June 22, 1812 – April 16, 1887) was an American lawyer, jurist, and politician who served as a United States representative from Ohio, Minister Resident of the United States to Bolivia and Chief Justice of the Supreme Court of the District of Columbia.

== Education and career ==
Born on June 22, 1812, in Jefferson County, New York, Cartter read law in 1832. He was admitted to the bar and entered private practice in Rochester, New York, from 1832 to 1836, and continued in private practice in Akron, Ohio, from 1836 to 1845, and in Massillon, Ohio, from 1845 to 1849. He is the author of an early history of Rochester from 1810 to 1827, a copy of which was deposited into the cornerstone of the then-new Rochester City Hall in 1873.

== Congressional service ==
Cartter was elected as a Democrat from Ohio's 18th congressional district to the United States House of Representatives of the 31st and 32nd United States Congresses, serving from March 4, 1849, to March 3, 1853. He was Chairman of the Committee on Patents for the 32nd United States Congress.

== Later career ==
Following his departure from Congress, Cartter resumed private practice in Massillon from 1853 to 1856, then in Cleveland, Ohio, from 1856 to 1861. He was a delegate to the 1860 Republican National Convention. He served as Minister Resident of the United States to Bolivia from March 27, 1861, to March 10, 1862.

== Federal judicial service ==
Cartter was nominated by President Abraham Lincoln on March 10, 1863, to the Supreme Court of the District of Columbia (now the United States District Court for the District of Columbia), to the new Chief Justice seat authorized by 12 Stat. 762. He was confirmed by the United States Senate on March 11, 1863, and received his commission the same day. His service terminated on April 16, 1887, due to his death in Washington, D.C. He was interred in Lake View Cemetery in Cleveland.

== Sources ==
- United States Congress. "David Kellogg Cartter (id: C000206)". Biographical Directory of the United States Congress.
- David Kellogg Cartter at the Biographical Directory of Federal Judges, a publication of the Federal Judicial Center.
- Wilson, J. G.; Fiske, J., eds. (1900). "Cartter, David Kellogg" . Appletons' Cyclopædia of American Biography. New York: D. Appleton.

U.S. House of Representatives
Preceded by Samuel Lahm	Member of the U.S. House of Representatives from Ohio's 18th congressional district 1849–1853	Succeeded by George Bliss
Diplomatic posts
Preceded by John Cotton Smith	Minister Resident of the United States to Bolivia; 1861–1862	Succeeded by Allen A. Hall
Legal offices
Preceded by Seat established by 12 Stat. 762	Chief Justice of the Supreme Court of the District of Columbia; 1863–1887	Succeeded by Edward Franklin Bingham
