= Samuel Lahm =

American politician (1812–1876)

Member of the U.S. House of Representatives from Ohio's 18th district
- In office March 4, 1847 – March 3, 1849
- Preceded by: David A. Starkweather
- Succeeded by: David K. Cartter

Member of the Ohio Senate from the Stark County district
- In office December 5, 1842 – December 1, 1844
- Preceded by: Jacob Hostetter Jr.
- Succeeded by: Daniel Groff

Personal details
- Born: April 22, 1812 Leitersburg, Maryland, U.S.
- Died: June 16, 1876 (aged 64) Canton, Ohio, U.S.
- Resting place: West Lawn Cemetery
- Party: Democratic
- Spouses: Almira Webster Brown (m. 1838) Henrietta Faber (m. 1855)
- Children: 8
- Education: Washington College
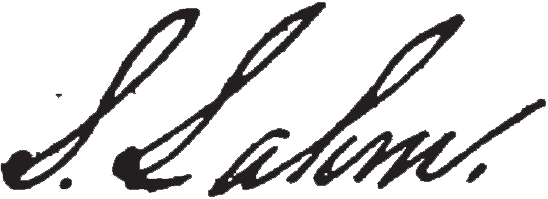
- Signature

Samuel Lahm (April 22, 1812 – June 16, 1876) was a lawyer, politician, and U.S. Representative from Ohio for one term from 1847 to 1849.

== Early life ==
Samuel Lahm was born on April 22, 1811, in Leitersburg, Maryland, to John Lahm. His parents emigrated from Germany. From the age of 12 to 18, he worked on his father's farm. At the age of around 18, he worked for three months at a dry goods store in Franklin County, Pennsylvania. Lahm then returned to his father's farm. He attended a school near Leitersburg for two years and taught at a school in the winter. He attended a seminary in Gettysburg, Pennsylvania, for a summer session. Lahm then taught at a school in Leitersburg for two years. He then attended Washington College in Washington, Pennsylvania, but did not graduate. Starting in March 1835, studied law with Oliver H. Smith in Indiana. Lahm was admitted to the Ohio bar in 1836.

== Career ==
Lahm intended to return to Leitersburg, but moved to Canton, Ohio, to open a practice. For a time in Canton, he was in the office of Almon Sortwell. He was a member of the Lyceum debating society in Canton. He partnered with Andrew W. Loomis in the law firm Loomis & Lahm until Loomis left Ohio in 1841. He served as the master of chancery from 1837 to 1841 and prosecuting attorney of Stark County from 1837 to 1845. He was selected as a delegate to the Democratic National Convention in 1844 in Baltimore, Maryland.

Lahm was elected as lieutenant colonel and later appointed as a brigadier general in the state's antebellum militia, and commanded the 2nd Brigade, 6th Division of Ohio during the Mexican War.

Lahm served as a member of the Ohio Senate from 1842 to 1844. He served as chairman of the committee on public institutions. He was an unsuccessful candidate for election in 1844 to the Twenty-ninth Congress. However, he was elected as a Democrat to the Thirtieth Congress, defeating Samuel Starkweather and served from March 4, 1847, to March 3, 1849. He lost election to Ohio's 18th congressional district in 1856. Lahm served as a delegate to the 1860 Democratic National Convention.

Retiring from politics, he engaged in agricultural pursuits and sheep raising.

== Personal life ==
In 1838, Lahm married Almira Webster Brown, daughter of Daniel Brown of Portsmouth, New Hampshire, and a relative of Daniel Webster by marriage. They had four sons and one daughter: Marshall, Edward, Frank Samuel, Charles Henry and Helen Rebecca. He later married Henrietta Faber of Pittsburgh in 1855. They had three daughters. He was the father of Frank Samuel Lahm, a noted expatriate and pioneer balloonist, and the grandfather of Brigadier General Frank Purdy Lahm, aerial pioneer, student of the Wright brothers, and the first military officer to fly an airplane. The two eldest sons served in the 115th Ohio Volunteer Infantry during the American Civil War and died in service within three weeks of each other, by sickness.

He died at his home on West Tuscarawas Street in Canton on June 16, 1876. He was interred in West Lawn Cemetery.

U.S. House of Representatives
Preceded by David A. Starkweather	Member of the U.S. House of Representatives from Ohio's 18th congressional district March 4, 1847 – March 3, 1849	Succeeded by David K. Cartter
