= Jacob Spangler =

American politician

Jacob Spangler (November 28, 1767 – June 17, 1843) was a member of the U.S. House of Representatives from Pennsylvania.

== Early life ==
Jacob Spangler was born in York, Pennsylvania. He attended the York County Academy and was engaged in surveying.

== Career ==
He served as a trumpeter in Captain McClellan's light horse company of York in 1799. He was county commissioner in 1800, postmaster of York from 1795 to 1812, deputy surveyor of York County, Pennsylvania, 1796 to 1815, and again county commissioner in 1814.

Spangler was elected as a Republican to the Fifteenth Congress and served until his resignation on April 20, 1818. He was surveyor general of Pennsylvania from 1818 to 1821. He became commander of the State militia, with title of general. He was the chief escort of General Lafayette from York to Harrisburg on his visit to the United States in 1825. He served as clerk of the York County Court until 1830, and again served as surveyor general of Pennsylvania from 1830 to 1836.

== Death ==
Spangler died in York, Pennsylvania, on June 17, 1843. He was interred in Prospect Hill Cemetery.

== Sources ==
- United States Congress. "Jacob Spangler (id: S000700)". Biographical Directory of the United States Congress.
- The Political Graveyard

U.S. House of Representatives
Preceded by Hugh Glasgow	Member of the U.S. House of Representatives from Pennsylvania's 4th congressional district 1817–1818	Succeeded by Jacob Hostetter
