= Frank P. Lahm =

American aviation pioneer (1877–1963)

Frank Purdy Lahm
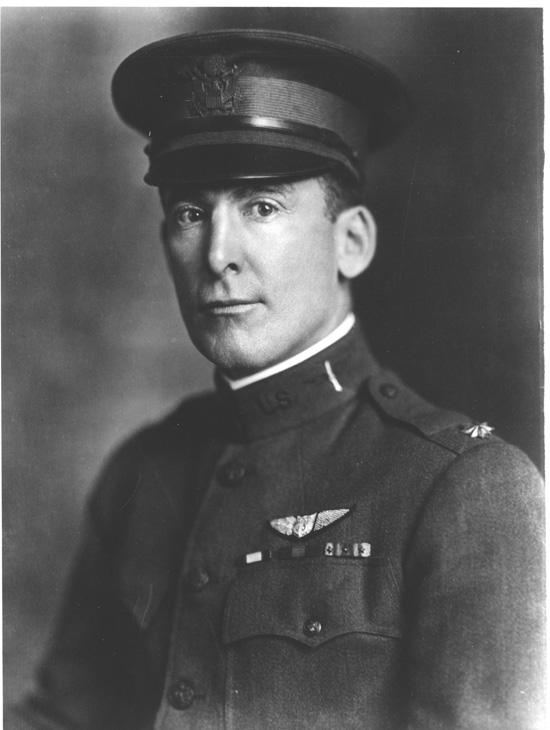
- Born: November 17, 1877; Mansfield, Ohio, U.S.
- Died: July 7, 1963 (aged 85); Sandusky, Ohio, U.S.
- Relatives: Samuel Lahm (grandfather)
- Military career
- Allegiance: United States
- Branch: United States Cavalry; Aviation Section, U.S. Signal Corps; United States Army Air Service; United States Army Air Corps
- Service years: 1901–1941
- Rank: Brigadier General
- Commands: Air Corps Training Center
- Conflicts: World War I
- Awards: Army Distinguished Service Medal; Legion of Merit

Frank Purdy Lahm (November 17, 1877 – July 7, 1963) was an American aviation pioneer, the "nation's first military aviator", and a general officer in the United States Army Air Corps and Army Air Forces.

Lahm developed an interest in flying from his father, a balloonist, and received among the first civil qualification certificates issued. He met the Wright Brothers in 1907 and used his interest in powered flight to become the Army's first certified pilot in 1909, followed four years later by becoming its 14th rated Military Aviator. In 1916 he became a career aviator, serving in the United States Army Air Service and its successors until his retirement in 1941 at the age of 64, rising to the rank of brigadier general.

Lahm reached mandatory retirement age on the eve of United States participation in World War II but contributed to the growth of the Air Force both during and following the war. Because of his leadership and administration during its construction, Lahm is also known as "the father of Randolph Field," and because of his lifelong devotion to aviation and aeronautical science, "the father of Air Force flight training".

== Childhood and early career ==
SOURCE NOTE: All dates of rank and dates of Permanent Change of Station where shown are from AFHRA, Biographical Data on Air Force General Officers, 1917–1952, Volume 1 – A through L

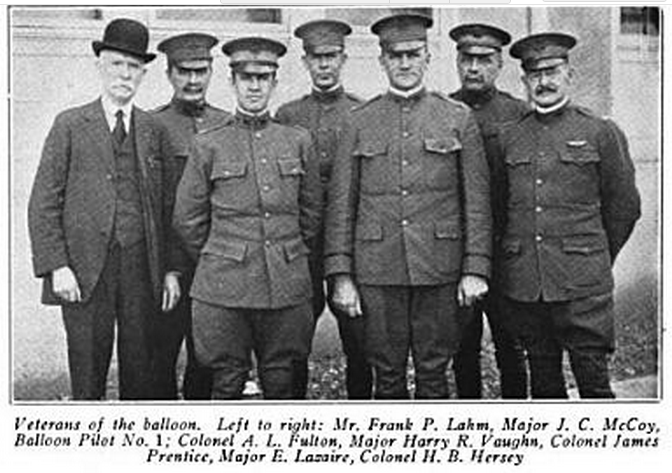
Frank Samuel Lahm in bowler with fellow ballonists

Lahm was born on November 17, 1877, in Mansfield, Ohio, to Adelaide Way Purdy and Frank Samuel Lahm, owner of a hat shop. He was the grandson of Samuel Lahm, a Canton lawyer and Ohio congressman, and related through his grandmother to Daniel Webster. His mother died unexpectedly in March 1880 while giving birth to a third child, which also died shortly after. His father had been in poor health for five years, and on the advice of doctors, undertook a trip to Southern France, Italy, and Switzerland in October to improve his condition. Lahm, then two, and his four-year-old sister Katherine were left in the care of relatives. Soon after culminating his recovery by scaling the Matterhorn in August 1881, Frank S. Lahm became the European agent for the Remington Typewriter Company. He resided in Paris until his death in 1931. The elder Lahm kept his family connected to one another through frequent correspondence, visits, and educating each child for a year in France.

Lahm's father made annual summer visits to a home he had purchased in 1877 in Summit County, Ohio, crossing the Atlantic Ocean fifty times to remain close to his children. Katherine lived with their aunt, Helen Lahm Greenwood, in Canton, Ohio, studied in France and at Smith College, and married an Army officer, Frank Parker, who retired as a major general in 1936. Lahm lived in Mansfield with another aunt, Mary Purdy Welden, who was a widow with two children, and became devoted to her as his surrogate mother. In high school, he excelled as an athlete, lettering in both football and baseball, until his father brought him to France in 1893.

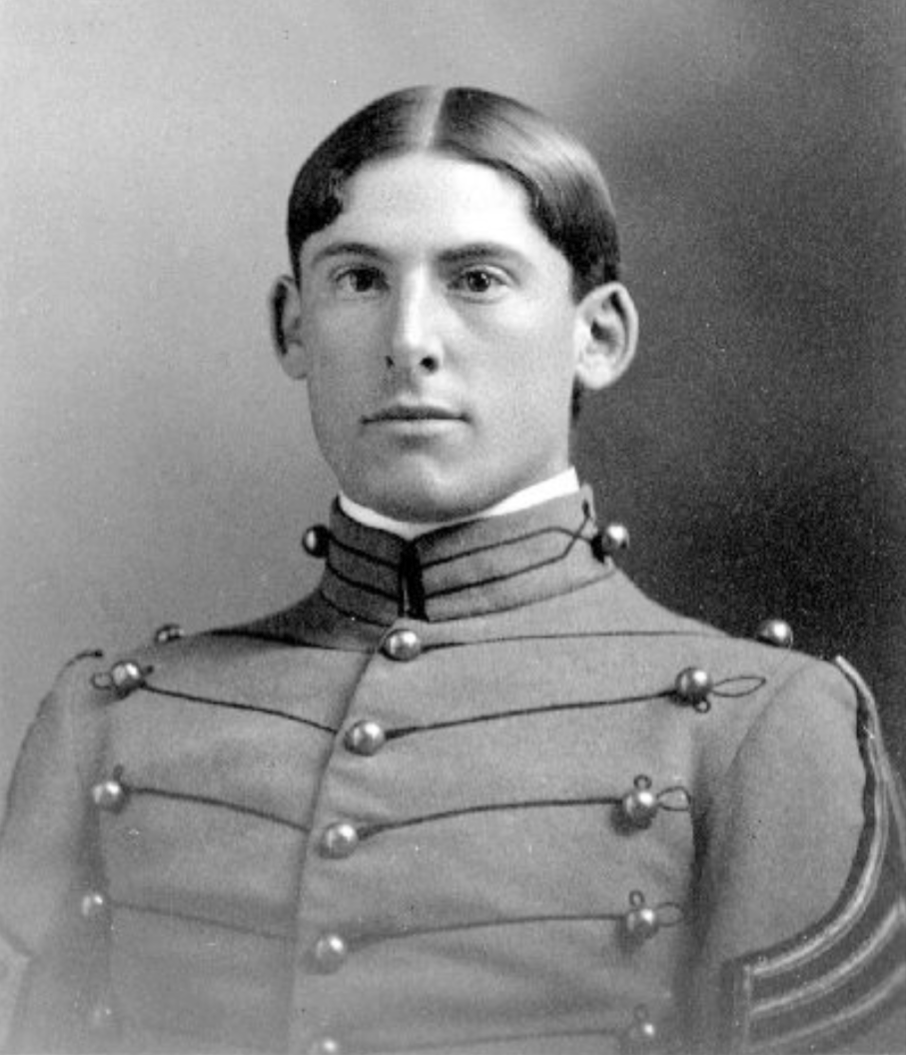
At West Point in 1901

There he attended Albert-le-Grand, a Dominican school near Paris, France, where he played rugby and participated in gymnastics and mountain climbing. Between 1895 and 1897, Lahm spent two years at Michigan Military Academy preparing for West Point. There he was Lieutenant of the Corps and valedictorian of his class. He entered the U.S. Military Academy in June 1897. Although he graduated in the top fifth of his class, he found time for athletics. He held the rope climbing record at West Point, and his enthusiasm for horse riding led him into the cavalry on his graduation in 1901, ranked 23rd in merit in his class of 74 cadets. While at USMA he quarterbacked the football team and was captain of the baseball team. He set several records in gymnastics.

He was commissioned second lieutenant, 6th Cavalry, and campaigned in the Philippines for two years. He toured China, Korea, and Japan during his return to the United States in 1903, where he was assigned to West Point as an instructor in modern languages for three years. (Note: Lahm was instructor in French to Cadet Henry H. Arnold.) He spent his summer leaves in France with his father, who taught him to fly balloons in the summer of 1904. In 1906 he was assigned to attend the Saumur Cavalry School.

Lahm's father joined the Aéro-Club de France in 1902 (at the age of 56), purchased a balloon he named the Katherine Hamilton in honor of his daughter, and qualified for his balloon pilot's certificate in November 1904. The elder Lahm made frequent flights and initiated his son during a night ascension in stormy weather. In the summer of 1905, 2nd Lt. Lahm completed the requirements of six ascensions, including one at night and one alone, to earn Fédération Aéronautique Internationale (FAI) certificate No. 4 as a balloon pilot. On July 15 of the same summer Lahm was promoted to first lieutenant.

In 1906, while awaiting entrance to Saumur, Lahm won the first Gordon Bennett Cup international balloon race against competitors from seven nations, all of which had a military officer as a crew member. The race, commencing at the Tuileries Garden in Paris, was actually a distance competition across the English Channel. His father had planned to pilot the balloon United States himself but desired to return to America for Katherine's wedding, and so recruited his son to fly in his place. Accompanied by Major Henry Blanchard Hersey (Note: Hersey, a graduate of Norwich University and a Rough Rider during the Spanish–American War, was in France to be an observer on a dirigible flight planned from Norway to the north pole.) of the United States Weather Bureau, who had studied the storm tracks and prevailing winds, Lahm started 12th in a field of 16 late in the afternoon of September 30. Under a full moon they reached the Channel before midnight and a lightship off the coast of England three hours later, where fog obscured the surface. The morning sun slowly burned off the fog and caused the balloon to ascend to 3,000 meters altitude. Lahm and Hersey established their position over Berkshire around 07:00 and continued north, gradually descending to avoid drifting out over the North Sea. They landed near Fylingdales in Yorkshire after covering a distance of 641 kilometers and more than 22 hours aloft.

=== Personality ===
Lahm's son Lawrence, himself a career officer, described his father's traits and characteristics in an essay he wrote in 1995:

He was five feet nine inches tall and was always very slender so that he appeared taller than he was actually…he had been a gymnast and the muscles of his arms and back stood out like ropes.
He was soft spoke and agreeable, yet, there was always a certain reserve. He was modest, honest, and true. He spoke well of others. As a boy he had gone to church twice on Sundays, once in the morning and once in the evening. He visited the sick and aged.
He loved games. He was an avid hunter and fisherman.
He was first a cavalryman before he became a flyer and he enjoyed riding and polo. In San Antonio, he had three polo ponies. I was never allowed to ride them, presumably because I would spoil them. He did, however, teach me to ride other horses, to swim, to golf, and to play baseball.
He enjoyed music and we sang on long automobile trips when he changed station from one Army post to another, my father and mother in the front seat and my sister, Barbara, and I in the back.
His posture was firmly erect and he possessed a cold courage that was remarkable. Beneath the calm exterior lay the competitiveness and combativeness fostered by the severe training at West Point.

== Aviation duties with the Signal Corps ==
=== Aeronautical Division ===
The Army detailed Lahm to the fledgling Aeronautical Division, a section in the Office of the Chief Signal Officer (OCSO), on September 17, 1907, while he was still in Europe. His departure from France was delayed after a relapse of the typhoid he contracted in the spring of 1907 and he took convalescent leave at a rest home in St. Germain. It was in the home's garden on August 1, 1907, the very day that the Aeronautical Division came into being, that Lahm's father introduced him to Wilbur and Orville Wright. The elder Lahm had personally investigated the claims of the brothers and had been quietly promoting them among his colleagues in France since 1905. The meeting was the beginning of a friendship that lasted until the two brothers died. Lahm learned that the Army, through the reluctance and disinterest of the Board of Ordnance and Fortification, had obstructed the attempts of the Wright Brothers to provide the Army with an airplane, and immediately wrote his new superior, Chief Signal Officer (CSO) Brig. Gen. James Allen (who sat on the board), urging that favorable consideration be given their most recent proposal.

En route to the United States, Lt. Lahm toured aviation sites in Germany and England, where he met Griffith Brewer, a balloonist who later became a pilot for the Wrights. In December, Lahm arrived at Fort Myer, Virginia, where he and a detachment of Signal Corps troops constructed a hydrogen generating plant and practiced captive observation balloon work. Alexander Graham Bell, inventor of the telephone and an early aviation enthusiast, often invited Lahm to join visiting scientists in his Washington home for discussions on many subjects, especially aviation. (Note: Bell chaired a group called the "Aerial Experiment Association" whose members were himself, Glenn Curtiss, Frederick W. "Casey" Baldwin, John A.D. "Douglas" McCurdy, and Army Lt. Thomas Selfridge, all of whom except Curtiss were wealthy young men interested in flying.)

The Signal Corps advertised specifications for a powered airplane on December 23, 1907, and among the three bids found acceptable was one submitted by the Wrights to build a plane within 200 days for $25,000. The Signal Corps budget had insufficient funds to meet the three bids, and in early February 1908, Lahm accompanied Gen. Allen and chief of the Aeronautical Division Capt Charles DeF. Chandler to meet with President Theodore Roosevelt to obtain funds from a contingency account.

On April 30, Lahm reported to New York City along with 1st Lt. Thomas Selfridge and Albert L. Stevens to familiarize 25 members of the 1st Company, Signal Corps, New York National Guard organizing a National Guard balloon unit (the "aeronautical corps") in the use of hydrogen-filled kite balloons. (Note: Designated as the 1st Aero Company, National Guard, New York, in November 1915, after the war it became the 102nd Aero Squadron (NYNG), now the oldest unit of the Air National Guard. The unit was mustered into federal service between July 13 and November 2, 1916, to support the Punitive Expedition in Mexico but did not complete its training before being returned to state control.) Upon his return from New York, Lahm became head of the Aeronautical Division when Capt. Chandler was transferred to command the Signal Corps Balloon Station at Fort Omaha, Nebraska, on May 13. (Note: The Air Force has not given recognition to the assignment and lists Chandler as division chief until 1910.) In August Lahm earned his second FAI certificate, Dirigible No. 2, and oversaw the Signal Corps acquisition of an airship from Thomas Scott Baldwin. On September 9, 1908, the Wright Brothers brought their 1908 Wright Flyer to Fort Myer for acceptance trials, and on its second flight Lahm accompanied Orville as a passenger, the first U.S. military officer to fly in a powered airplane, on a flight of six minutes and 24 seconds. (Note: Ironically, Lahm's father preceded him in that aerial feat too. Earlier in the summer Frank S. Lahm had gone up with Wilbur on a demonstration flight in France. (Kenney 2007, p. 28)) The aircraft was destroyed, and Lt. Selfridge killed, in a crash on September 17. (Note: The second officer to fly was the acting Chief Signal Officer, Major George O. Squier, on September 12. Squier headed the Signal Corps' Aviation Section in 1916–1917. Selfridge was the first fatality in powered flight.)

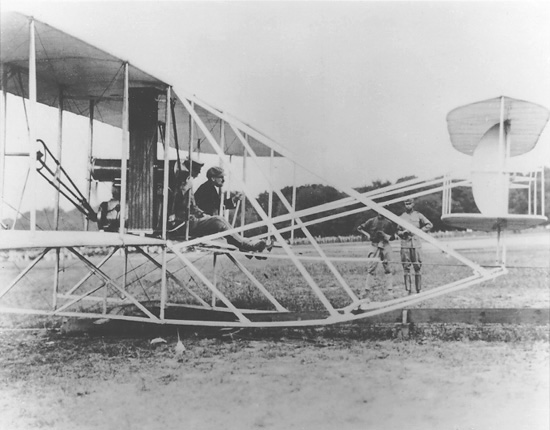
Frank Lahm (hand on upright by gas tank) with Orville Wright qualifying Signal Corps No. 1, July 27, 1909.

The Wright brothers brought an improved version of their 1908 plane to Fort Myer in 1909 for further War Department trials. After practice hops Orville Wright, with Lieutenant Lahm as a passenger, made the first official test flight on July 27. He and Lahm established a world's record for a two-man flight: one hour, 12 minutes and 40 seconds, to meet the Army's specification for the aircraft, designated Signal Corps (S.C.) Number 1, being the first airplane purchased by the U.S. Army. The Wright Brothers set out to fulfill their Army contracts by teaching officers to operate the machine, with Lahm and 2nd Lt. Frederic E. Humphreys selected by Gen. Allen as candidates. In October 1909 Wilbur Wright trained both at a field in College Park, Maryland recommended by Lahm after balloon observations and inspections on horseback. Lahm made the first flight at the new field on October 8. Both officers soloed, with Humphreys going first. After only 14 flights, Lahm was pronounced a pilot on October 26. He Received FAI Airplane certificate No. 2, and took up his first passenger, the U.S. Navy's observer Lt. George C. Sweet, on November 3. (Note: Lahm's flight training time was three hours, seven minutes, and 38 seconds. He received the second-ever FAI airplane certificate, behind Glenn Curtiss, but ahead of both Wrights, who received the 4th and 5th. On May 24, 1911, after the FAI recognized the American Aero Club as the "governing authority for the United States of America", the ACA licensed Lahm with Aviator License No. 2.)

Lahm and Humphreys crashed November 5, but both were uninjured, and the airplane was repaired. However the Signal Corps lost the service of both when they were returned to their regular assignments by their respective branches. In December 1909 Lahm joined the 7th Cavalry at Fort Riley, Kansas.

In June 1910 Lahm attended Mounted Service School and graduated in June 1911. In October he married high school history teacher Gertrude Jenner in Mansfield, then rejoined the 7th Cavalry in the Philippines. At the request of the Signal Corps he opened a seasonal flying school on the polo ground of Fort William McKinley near Manila on March 12, 1912. S.C. No. 7, a Wright Model B aircraft shipped to the Philippines, was assembled and made its first flight on March 21. Lahm trained 1st Lt. Moss L. Love and Corporal Vernon Burge, the first enlisted pilot in the Army, in April and May 1912. (Note: Burge was a mechanic who had accompanied S.C. No. 7 to the Philippines, and had been one of Lahm's original detail at Ft. Myer. He was approved after no other officers volunteered for training, and although higher authority later rescinded the authorization, he had already received his FAI certificate.)

On May 8, 1912, Lahm crash-landed S.C. No. 7 in mud on the Taguig River after his engine failed, and again on May 29, putting the aircraft out of operation for a total of 13 days. After an engine change, the aircraft was much more reliable, but the rainy season shut down the school and he returned to troop duty. On March 10, 1913, he began a second season of instruction, training three more officers. (Note: 2nd Lts Carleton G. Chapman, Herbert A. Dargue, and C. Perry Rich.) On June 17, 1913, before flying was shut down again because the airfield was too muddy, Lahm conducted a 21-mile reconnaissance from Ft. McKinley to Alabang, drawing accurate sketches of positions of the 7th and 8th Cavalry on maneuvers there. On July 19, 1913, he passed a Signal Corps-required flying test administered by the Aero Club of America (even though he had received an ACA aviator license in 1911) and received ACA Expert Aviator's Certificate No. 15, which also qualified him to be rated as a Military Aviator.

After S.C. No 7 became a total loss in August, Lahm's small detachment received a new aircraft, S.C. No. 13, a Wright C Speed Scout equipped with pontoons for water landings. On September 11, 1913, Lahm attempted a water takeoff for a flight test but the center of gravity on the aircraft made it tail-heavy and it flipped over. Although the aircraft was totally destroyed, Lahm was saved from drowning by a life jacket. In November, at his own request, he was relieved of flying duties and returned to troop duties. He was assigned to command of a troop of the 7th Cavalry in September 1914, just after the outbreak of war in Europe.

=== Aviation Section ===
In October 1914 Lahm was assigned to the 6th Cavalry at Texas City and Harlingen, Texas until April 1916. Having completed the required years of troop duty in his branch, he was detailed to the Aviation Section, U.S. Signal Corps, which had replaced the Aeronautical Division as the Army's aviation arm in August 1914. Lahm's rating was changed to that of Junior Military Aviator (Note: All those holding Military Aviator ratings were re-rated when a provision of the 1914 law mandated three years experience as a JMA as a prerequisite for MA rating.) and he was placed on flying duty again. This resulted in his immediate promotion to captain in accordance with another provision of the law. He reported for duty on April 1, 1916, at the Rockwell Field, San Diego, California as Secretary (adjutant) of the Signal Corps Aviation School and President of the Junior Military Aviator Examining Board. On May 29, 1916, Captain Lahm was briefly detached to the 3rd Field Artillery Regiment at Fort Sam Houston, Texas, to practice using captive balloon ascensions for artillery spotting. Shortly after, on June 12, his permanent rank of captain, Cavalry, was approved.

In January 1917 Lahm was involved in a controversy that estranged him from Henry H. Arnold, future Chief of the Army Air Forces. Arnold was supply officer for the Aviation School, having returned to the Aviation Section from the Infantry the previous May. On January 6, Arnold was present in Lahm's office when the Officer In Charge of Training, Capt. Herbert A. Dargue, came in to protest an authorization for a flight. A student at the school's Field Officers course, Lt. Col. Harry G. Bishop of the Field Artillery, had asked for a plane and pilot to fly to an unspecified location, and Dargue protested that the flight interfered with scheduled training. According to Arnold's statement to investigators, Lahm told Dargue to "carry out his instructions" without further explanation. On January 10 the flight took place, despite a second protest from Dargue to the school commandant, Col. William A. Glassford, and became lost with its crew somewhere in Mexico. When Glassford called in Lahm, he denied authorizing the flight, and Glassford made a public announcement to that effect based on Lahm's denial. The plane, which apparently had been headed to Calexico, had drifted off course and come down in the Sonoran Desert, with Bishop and his pilot finally located and rescued nine days later. Dargue had shown Arnold the original authorization signed by Lahm, however, which Arnold verified to investigators on January 27. On January 30, one day after the birth of his son, Arnold was transferred to Panama, which he attributed to retribution by Lahm and Glassford. (Note: Glassford had ordered that no immediate air search be conducted, infuriating the aviators including Arnold to the point of mutiny, only countermanding the order six days later when it became public in the newspapers. He was retired on April 11 as a result of the incident for failing to mount an effective search in a timely manner.)

After the United States entered World War I, Lahm became commanding officer of the Army Balloon School at Fort Omaha on May 24, 1917. At that time he was the Army's only airplane, balloon, and dirigible pilot. On June 27, Lahm received promotion to major in the Aviation Section, Signal Corps. He suffered a severely broken leg early in June when his polo pony "Joe" slipped on a paved street in Omaha and fell on him. As he was about to start sick leave, Lahm was offered a six-week inspection tour of balloon schools, equipment, and operations in both Britain and France. He received confidential orders from Gen. Tasker H. Bliss on July 25, and another promotion to temporary lieutenant colonel, Signal Corps, on August 5. Lahm sailed from New York City on August 23 aboard the RMS Baltic and arrived in England on September 15, 1917, where he began keeping a war diary. (Note: Lahm's diary noted that his father joined the Signal Corps as a balloon inspector just prior to his departure overseas.)

== Air Service, AEF ==
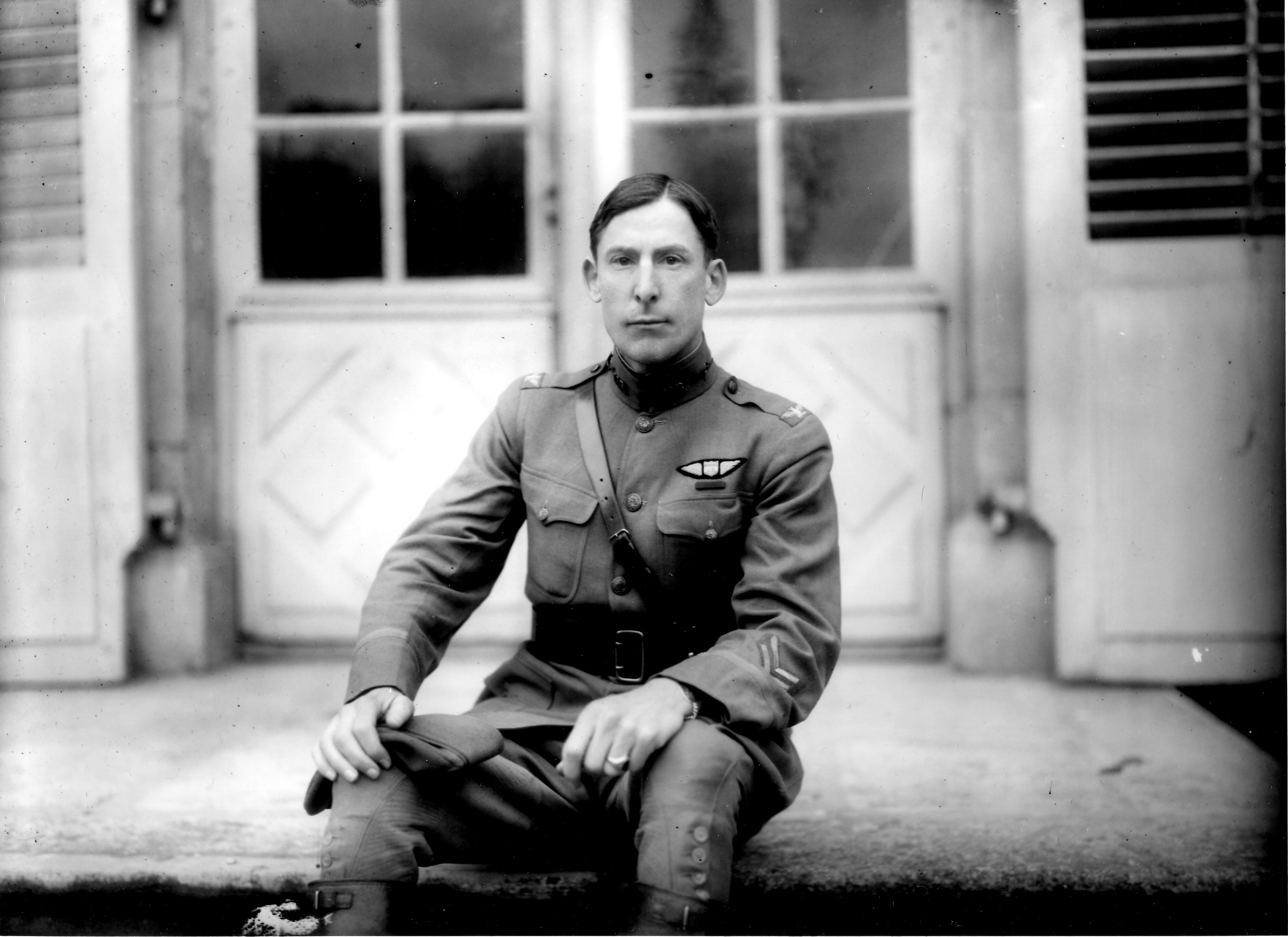
Lahm in October 1918

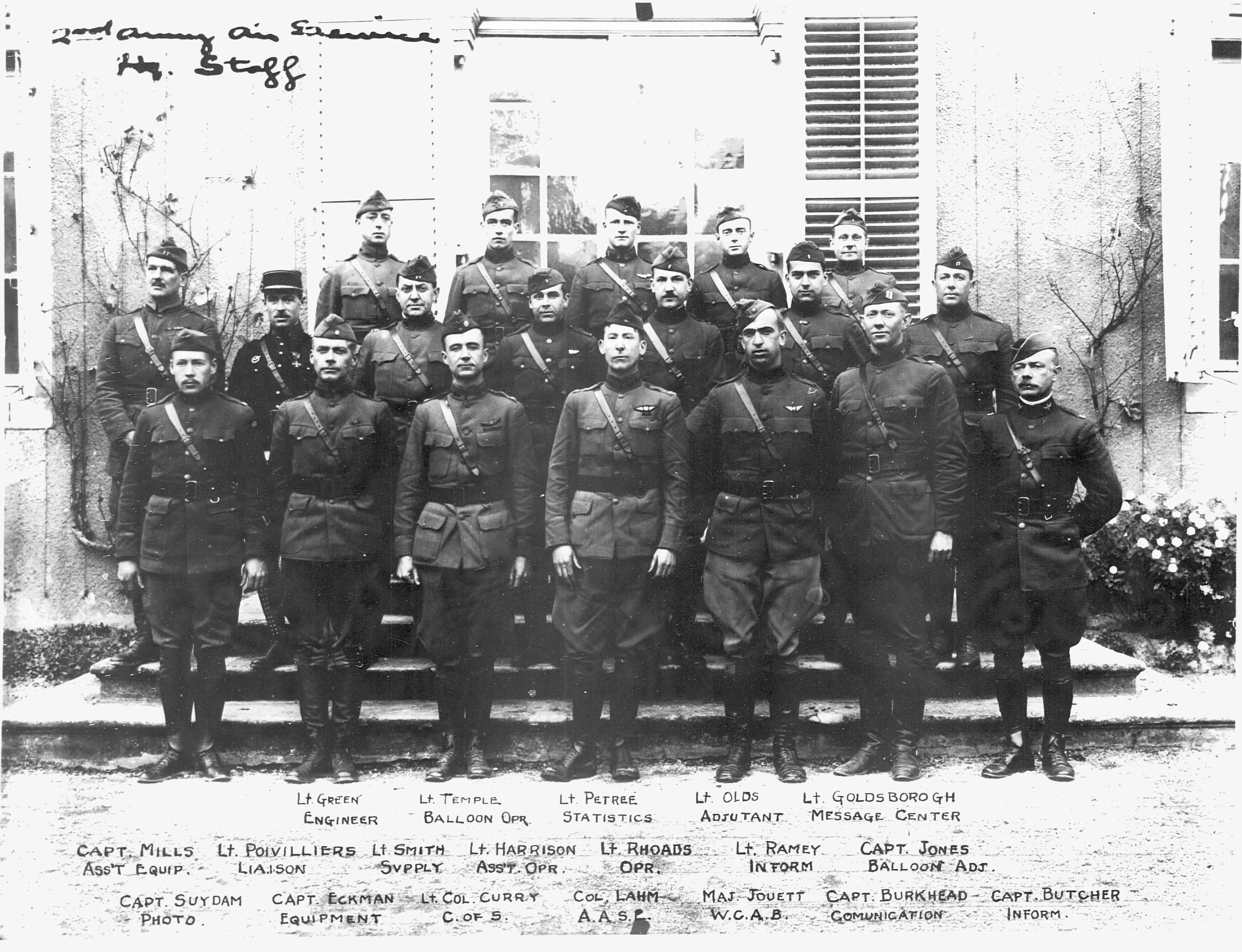
Lahm (center front row) and the staff of the Air Service, Second Army, November 1918

Lahm's assignment in England began with nine days of inspections of factories, depots, and training fields. On September 24 he flew the English Channel as an observer on a Bristol Fighter, landing at Saint-Omer and continuing on to Montrouge, where the 2nd Wing, 2nd Air Brigade of the British Second Army was situated. On October 2, Lahm reported to Col. Raynal Bolling, at the headquarters of the Air Service, Zone of the Interior, in Paris, then was summoned to General Headquarters of the American Expeditionary Force (GHQ AEF) in Chaumont. He made inspections of French balloon facilities before going to the headquarters of the French Sixth Army at Vauxbuin on October 15 to observe French Caquot balloons, slated for use by the Air Service, in battle at Soissons.

Lahm's orders to return to the United States were rescinded and he was assigned to organize the balloon section of the Air Service headquarters in Paris. After doing so, he found himself ranked out of command on November 23, 1917, by now-Col. Charles DeF. Chandler, who had arrived in France as part of the massive staff of Brig. Gen. Benjamin Foulois. Lahm went instead to Chaumont as the section's liaison to GHQ AEF until February 23, 1918, when he was moved to Colombey-les-Belles in the same capacity to the Air Service, Advance Section, Services of Supply, where he supervised the tactical training of balloon companies before their assignment to the front as artillery spotters.

On June 3, 1918, an air service for the soon-to-be-activated U.S. First Army was set up at Toul, with Foulois in command. Lahm was chosen to be his chief of staff, and remained so until after the Battle of Chateau-Thierry, when Foulois voluntarily turned over his command to Brig. Gen. Billy Mitchell (who already had Col. Thomas D. Milling as his chief of staff) on July 27. Lahm was shifted to the headquarters of the First Army, which was about to be activated, as Air Officer to its G-3 (Operations) Section. On August 14, with the activation of the army, he was promoted to temporary colonel.

On October 12, the AEF expanded to two field armies, and Lahm was named Chief of Air Service, Second Army at Toul. He chose Lt. Col. John F. Curry to be his chief of staff and began organizing it. He remained in France in command of the Second Army Air Service until it was dissolved on April 15, 1919. His diary entry for that date states:

Starting with an Air Service of three observation squadrons in Oct., it grew to two pursuit groups with a total of 7 squadrons, seven observation squadrons, a bombing group of two squadrons, three park squadrons, eleven balloon companies, 5 photo sections, a total of 700 officers and 5300 men.

Lahm remained on unassigned duty in France until July 30, 1919, when he sailed from Brest on the converted troopship SS Leviathan, arriving at Hoboken, New Jersey, on August 7. The next day he reported to headquarters of the reorganized Air Service and was issued orders to attend the General Staff College.

== Postwar service ==
=== Advancement to general officer ===
Lahm reverted to his permanent establishment rank of captain on September 9, 1919, and began studies as a "special student" (because his rank had been reduced below that of field grade) at the General Staff College in Washington D.C., through June 1920. The Air Service was made a statutory part of the Army on June 4, 1920, and Lahm applied for transfer to the new branch. He was promoted to major on July 1 and lieutenant colonel on July 2, then transferred in grade to the Air Service on August 6. Lahm was assigned to the War Department General Staff (WDGS) as a staff member and later chief of the Organization Branch, Operation and Training Division (G-3) from August 25, 1920, to July 1, 1924. He was then Air Officer at the Ninth Corps Area at the Presidio of San Francisco, California.

On July 2, 1926, the Air Service was renamed the Air Corps by act of Congress and authorized two additional brigadier general positions as assistant chiefs of Air Corps. Lahm was advanced to brigadier general on July 17, 1926, for a four-year tour as an assistant chief, to be commander of the new Air Corps Training Center, established at San Antonio, Texas, on August 16, 1926. (Note: ACTC's first day of administration was September 1, 1926. (War Department General Order 26)) Command of the training center included the coordination and management of training at the Air Corps Primary Flying School at Brooks Field, the Advanced Flying School at Kelly Field, and the School of Aviation Medicine at Brooks.

=== Randolph Field ===
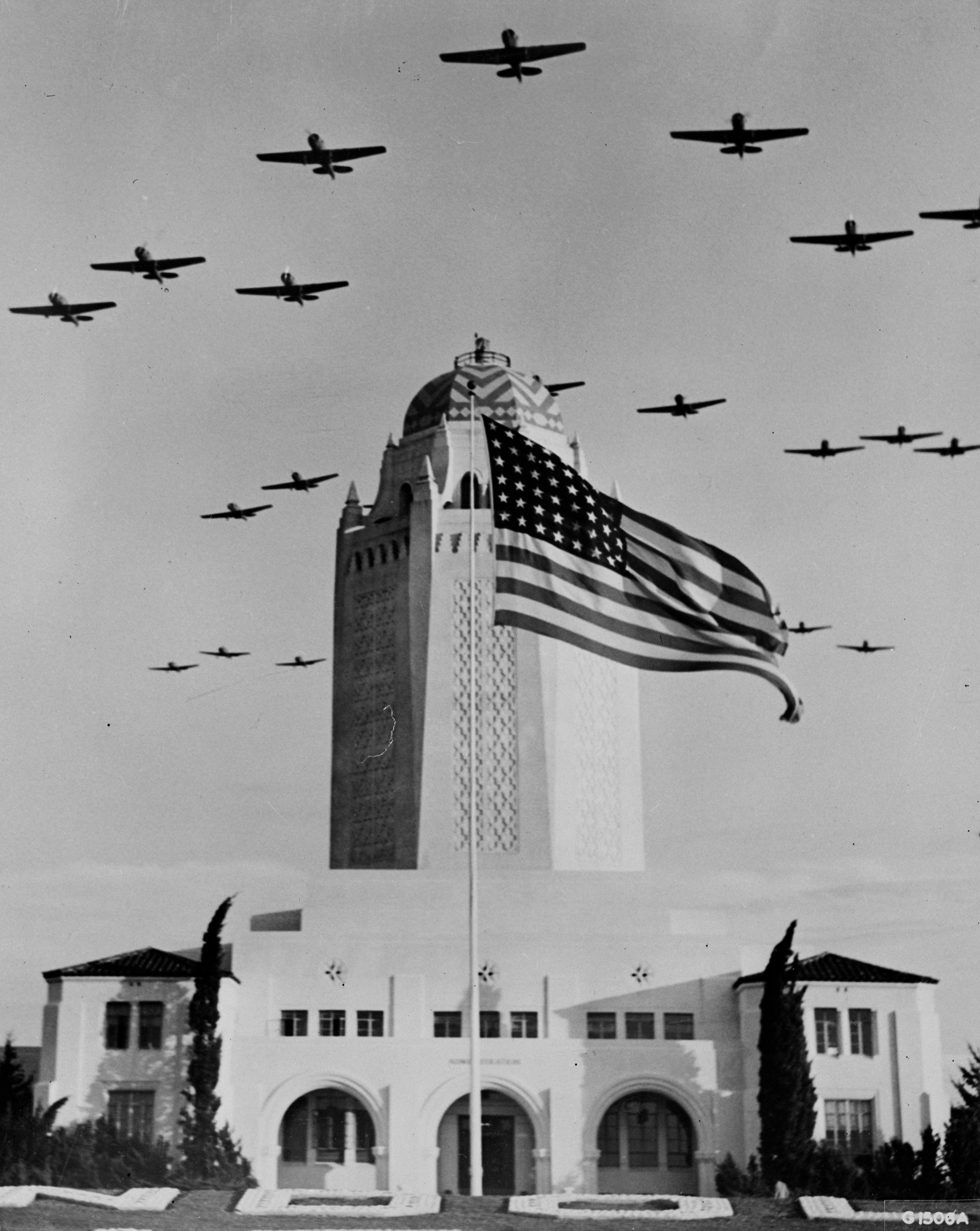
Randolph Field, 1942

Almost immediately Lahm understood that because of the small size of his bases, their deteriorated condition (originally built as temporary in World War I), and the encroachment of San Antonio, his charge to "coordinate the training in the schools with a view of bringing them as close together as possible, and particularly with a view to making the transition easier for the students going from one school to the other" required expansion of the center by construction of a new facility. After Chief of Air Corps Maj. Gen. Mason Patrick recommended the same in December 1926, Lahm appointed a board of five officers on April 18, 1927, to draw up plans for a model airfield. The next day, after reviewing unsolicited plans offered by 1st Lt. Harold L. Clark, an architect-trained former flying instructor now serving as a Kelly Field motor pool officer, it recommended a "revolutionary" four-quadrant circular layout that placed the structures between parallel runways aligned with the prevailing winds. Lahm then tasked the board to find a suitable location in May. (Note: Clark became a brigadier general during World War II and commanded the 52nd Troop Carrier Wing during four airborne operations, including the American airborne landings in Normandy and Operation Market Garden, before retiring in 1946.)

Lahm originally dictated that the location be within 10 miles of San Antonio, but difficulties finding a site suited to the planned design, and the large size required, forced a resumption of the search in October 1927 out to an expanded distance of 30 miles. (Note: The land had to be acquired with clear title by local entities and then donated to the government, per War Department policy, and also had to be free of all restrictions to use.) While the location problem was being settled, Lahm assigned Clark to begin work on plans and layout of the new base on December 8, 1927. (Note: Clark's first formal design, submitted to Lahm on November 1, 1927, was revised in December and January and sent to the Chief of Air Corps. The Air Education and Training Command history of Randolph AFB places the date of the detail as December 5.) A location near Schertz, 18 miles from San Antonio, was obtained by the San Antonio Chamber of Commerce and offered to Lahm on the last day of 1927, who sent the proposal to Secretary of War Dwight F. Davis. In February Congress authorized President Calvin Coolidge to accept the gift, but it was August 16, 1928, before the legal processes ran their course and the property acquired.

While this took place, in April the new Chief of Air Corps, Maj. Gen. James Fechet, appointed a committee of senior officers headed by Brig. Gen. Benjamin D. Foulois to approve a design. In July it rejected the circular layout proposed for the new base and put forth a plan that placed all buildings in one corner of the property. Just prior to acceptance of the property, Lahm sharply criticized the revision to Fechet and a reconsideration, also on August 16, 1928, approved the original circular design. Clark was then detailed for special duty in Washington D.C. as Lahm's liaison with the Construction Service, Quartermaster Corps, which would build the base. (Note: The actual architect of the base was George B. Ford, an architect and city planner retained by the Army between 1926 and 1930 to approve all site and development plans for Army installations.)

Construction of Randolph Field (Note: Named for Capt. William M. Randolph, the adjutant of the Advanced Flying School and an Austin, Texas-native, killed in an air crash in February 1928.) began on November 21, 1928. The site was cleared, the basic infrastructure completed, and somewhat less than half the buildings erected when the base was dedicated on June 20, 1930, as the "West Point of the Air", (Note: The phrase is credited to San Antonio Mayor C.M. Chambers) but Lahm's four-year tour as an assistant chief of Air Corps ended in July well before construction was completed. (Note: Lahm was succeeded by Brig. Gen. Charles L. Danforth, a mustang who had come up through the ranks from private during the Spanish–American War, but who had not joined the Air Service until 1920.) Nevertheless, Lahm's role in the creation of Randolph Field was characterized as "providing the administrative initiative and energy required to crystallize these ideas into definite plans and to press them to a successful conclusion," and he is noted by the USAF's Air Education and Training Command as "the father of Randolph Field."

=== Air Officer and attaché duties ===
At the end of his tour he reverted to his permanent rank of lieutenant colonel, assigned again as Air Officer, Ninth Corps Area until July 1931, when his wife died of pneumonia, leaving him a widower with two young children, Lawrence, 12, and Barbara, 8. (Note: After a year at Yale, Lawrence Lahm was a member of the West Point Class of 1942.) His father had developed cancer, and Lahm brought him back to the summer home for a final visit. Lahm was promoted to full colonel on October 1, 1931, and sent to the U.S. Embassy, Paris, France, in November to act as assistant military attaché for air to France, Spain, and Belgium. Shortly after his arrival in France, his father died in Paris on December 31. In 1933 Lahm became full military attaché to France. He remained in Paris until 1935, with collateral duty as military attaché to the U.S. Embassy in Brussels, Belgium.

In October 1935 Lahm returned to the United States as Air Officer, Second Corps Area, at Governors Island, New York, until December 14, 1940, when he became Chief of Aviation to the First Army. He received the Legion of Merit for his contribution to this command during its important formative period. President Franklin D. Roosevelt awarded Lahm an honorary promotion major general in September 1941.

The extent of expanded pilot requirements immediately preceding World War II necessitated decentralization of Air Corps flight training, which had been the core element of the program after Lahm organized the Air Corps Training Center. The ACTC was broken up geographically, establishing three regional training centers. The ACTC, still headquartered at Randolph, was renamed the Gulf Coast Air Corps Training Center and became operational in February 1941. Lahm served as its commander from October 21, 1941, to his mandatory retirement on November 20, 1941. He retired, after more than forty years of continuous military service, in the grade of brigadier general. Three weeks later, in the wake of the attack on Pearl Harbor, he offered to come off the retired list but was not accepted. (Note: The role, if any, that Arnold played in denying Lahm service in World War II because of the 1917 Bishop incident and the fact that Lahm served in France while Arnold did not, is only speculative.)

== Retirement and legacy ==
Lahm assisted with war bond drives and was active in a number of civic organizations. He was wedded in Hollywood, California, on April 3, 1948, to Grace Wolfe Kenson, a lifelong friend, the daughter of a Mansfield judge and widow of a dentist.

On June 15, 1960, Lahm was recognized by the Air Force and the Early Birds of Aviation as "the father of Air Force flight training" in ceremonies at Wright-Patterson Air Force Base, with 600 Air Force Academy cadets in attendance. In May 1962, the Chief of Staff of the United States Air Force, Gen. Curtis E. LeMay, honored Lahm with a special citation recognizing him as the nation's first military aviator.

Lahm died July 7, 1963, of a stroke at Good Samaritan Hospital in Sandusky, Ohio. He was cremated and his ashes spread over Randolph Air Force Base.

In 1943 Lahm completed and published How Our Army Grew Wings, begun in the 1930s in collaboration with Col. Chandler, who died in 1939. His war diary in World War I has been preserved since 1970 by the Air Force Historical Research Agency (AFHRA) as USAF Historical Study No. 141. The United States Air Force Academy's first hot air balloon was named in his honor in 1973. Both Mansfield Lahm Regional Airport and the Administration Building of Mansfield Lahm Air National Guard Base are named for Lahm. In 2009, he was inducted in the First Flight Society along with Humphreys as the first military aviation trainees. (Note: The First Flight Society incorrectly identifies Foulois as the "first United States military aviator". Foulois' training as an airship pilot pre-dated Lahm, but he was assigned to heavier-than-air pilot training specifically because Lahm was no longer detailed as a pilot.)

In 1963, Lahm was inducted into the National Aviation Hall of Fame in Dayton, Ohio.

== Awards and decorations ==
SOURCE: Biographical Data on Air Force General Officers, 1917–1952, Volume 2 – L through Z

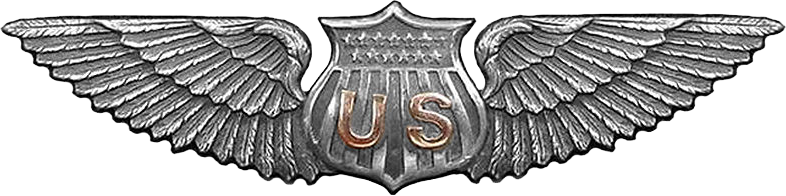
Airplane Pilot

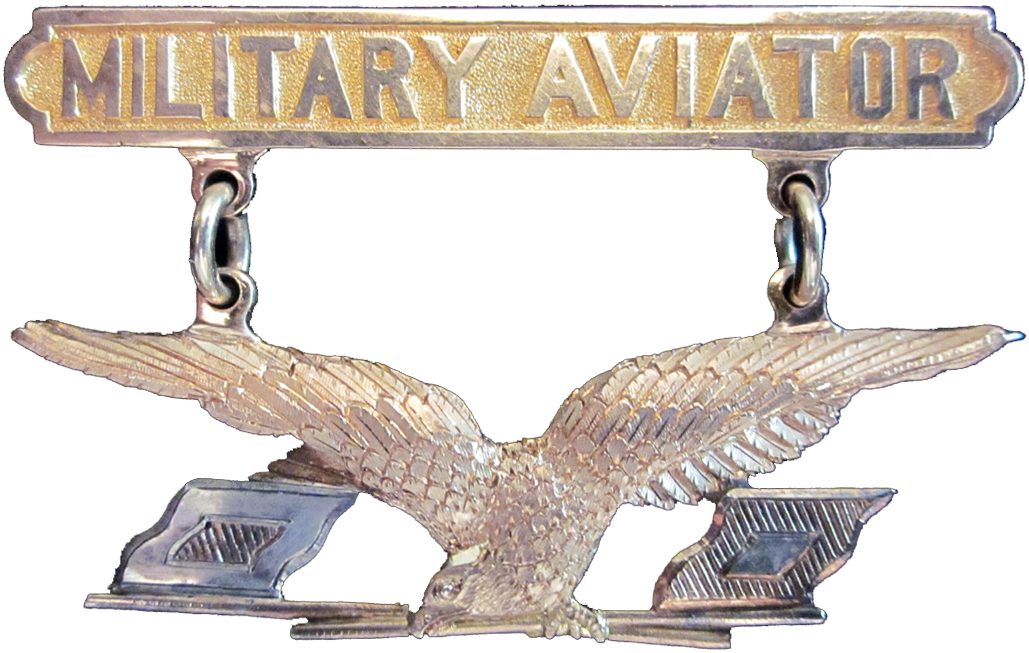
Military Aviator (Note: Portraits of Lahm from late in his career show that he wore his Military Aviator badge in place of his pilot wings.)

Distinguished Service Medal
Legion of Merit
Mexican Service Medal
World War I Victory Medal

Officer of the Legion of Honor (France)

Commander of the Military Order of Aviz (Portugal)

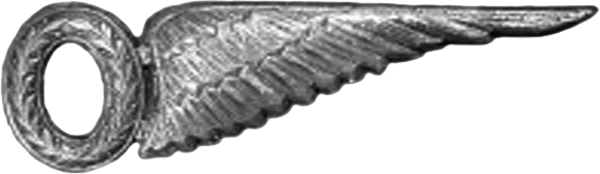
Airplane Observer

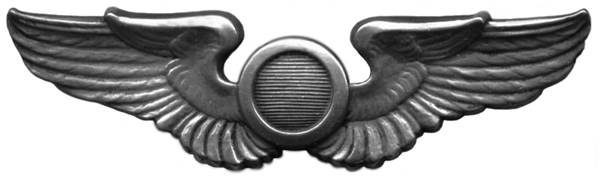
Combat Observer

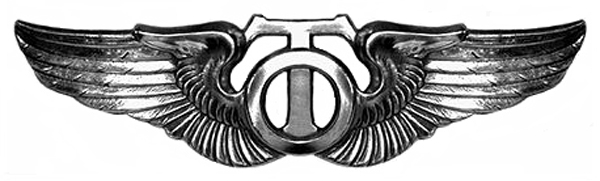
Technical Observer

== Notes ==
Footnotes

Citations
