= Hugh Glasgow =

American politician

Member of the U.S. House of Representatives from Pennsylvania's 4th district
- In office March 4, 1813 – March 3, 1817
- Preceded by: See below
- Succeeded by: Jacob Spangler

Personal details
- Born: September 8, 1769 East Nottingham Township, Province of Pennsylvania, British America
- Died: January 31, 1818 (aged 48) Peach Bottom, Pennsylvania, U.S.
- Party: Democratic-Republican

Hugh Glasgow (September 8, 1769 – January 31, 1818) was a member of the U.S. House of Representatives from Pennsylvania.

== Biography ==
Hugh Glasgow was born in East Nottingham Township in the Province of Pennsylvania. He engaged in agricultural pursuits. He studied law, was admitted to the bar and practiced. He was judge of York County, Pennsylvania, from July 1, 1800, to March 29, 1813.

Glasgow was elected as a Republican to the Thirteenth and Fourteenth Congresses. He died at Peach Bottom, Pennsylvania and was interred at Slate Ridge Burying Ground.

== Sources ==
- United States Congress. "Hugh Glasgow (id: G000231)". Biographical Directory of the United States Congress.
- The Political Graveyard

U.S. House of Representatives
Preceded by Robert Whitehill; David Bard	Member of the U.S. House of Representatives from Pennsylvania's 4th congressional district 1813–1817	Succeeded by Jacob Spangler
