= Jacob Hostetter =

American politician and judge (1754–1831)

Member of the U.S. House of Representatives from Pennsylvania's 4th district
- In office November 16, 1818 – March 3, 1821
- Preceded by: Jacob Spangler
- Succeeded by: James S. Mitchell

Member of the Pennsylvania General Assembly
- In office 1797–1802

Personal details
- Born: May 9, 1754 near York, Province of Pennsylvania, British America
- Died: June 29, 1831 (aged 77)
- Party: Democratic-Republican
- Children: Jacob Jr.
- Occupation: Politician; clockmaker; judge

Jacob Hostetter (May 9, 1754 – June 29, 1831) was a judge, member of the Pennsylvania General Assembly, and a member of the U.S. House of Representatives from Pennsylvania.

== Early life ==
Jacob Hostetter was born on May 9, 1754, near York (later Hanover) in the Province of Pennsylvania. He attended the common schools and worked as a clockmaker. He manufactured the Hostetter clock out of a building in Hanover.

== Career ==
Hostetter was a member of the general assembly of Pennsylvania from 1797 to 1802. Hostetter was commissioned as judge in York County on February 28, 1801. He succeeded John Stewart who left for the U.S. Congress and was succeeded by John L. Hinkle.

He was elected as a Republican to the Fifteenth Congress to fill the vacancy caused by the resignation of Jacob Spangler. He was re-elected as a Republican to the Sixteenth Congress.

Around 1825, Hostetter moved to Ohio and settled in New Lisbon, Ohio. He then continued working as a clockmaker with his son Jacob Jr. He later moved to Canton.

== Personal life ==
Hostetter's son Jacob served in the Ohio legislature and worked as an associate judge. He was a minister of the Mennonite Church.

Hostetter died on June 29, 1831.

== Sources ==
- United States Congress. "Jacob Hostetter (id: H000806)". Biographical Directory of the United States Congress.
- The Political Graveyard

U.S. House of Representatives
Preceded by Jacob Spangler	Member of the U.S. House of Representatives from Pennsylvania's 4th congressional district 1818–1821	Succeeded by James S. Mitchell
