= Jacob Hostetter Jr. =

American politician and judge (died 1868)

Member of the Ohio Senate from the Stark County district
- In office 1838–1842
- Preceded by: David A. Starkweather
- Succeeded by: Samuel Lahm

Member of the Ohio House of Representatives from the Stark County district
- In office 1837–1838 Serving with Matthew Johnson
- Preceded by: Hugh R. Caldwell and Peter M. Wise
- Succeeded by: Matthew Johnson and James Welch

Personal details
- Died: November 3, 1868 (aged 83) Milltown, Indiana, U.S.
- Parent: Jacob Hostetter (father)
- Occupation: Politician; judge; farmer

Jacob Hostetter Jr. (died November 3, 1868) was an American politician and judge from Ohio. He served as a member of the Ohio House of Representatives from 1837 to 1838 and as a member of the Ohio Senate from 1838 to 1842.

== Early life ==
Jacob Hostetter Jr. was born to Jacob Hostetter. His father was a clock maker and Pennsylvania politician and judge.

== Career ==
Hostetter moved from Hanover, Pennsylvania, to New Lisbon, Ohio, in 1820 or 1822. He operated the Union House, a hotel there. In 1824, he moved to Canton.

Hostetter was judge of the court of common pleas for several years. He served as a member of the Ohio House of Representatives from 1837 to 1838. He also served as a member of the Ohio Senate from 1838 to 1842.

== Personal life ==
Hostetter lived on a farm in Minerva.

Hostetter died on November 3, 1868, at the age of 83, at the home of his son in Milltown, Indiana.
