= David Hostetter =

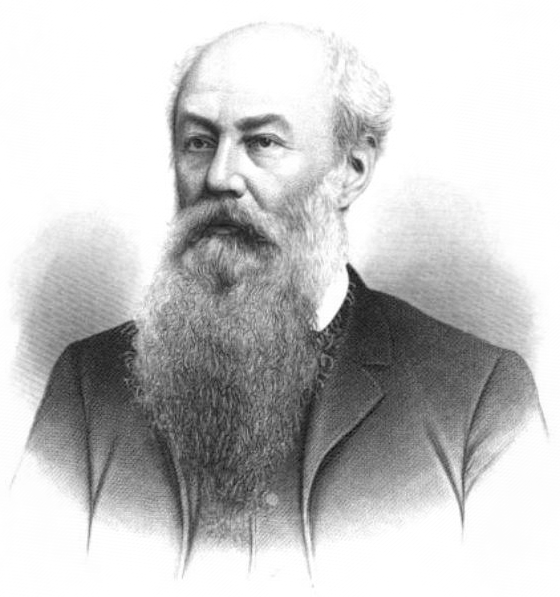
- Born: January 23, 1819; Lancaster County, Pennsylvania, US
- Died: November 5, 1888 (aged 69); New York, New York, US
- Resting place: Allegheny Cemetery, Pittsburgh, Pennsylvania
- Occupation: Businessman
- Spouse: Rosetta (Rickey) Hostetter (m. 1854)
- Children: 5, including Theodore R. Hostetter

Signature
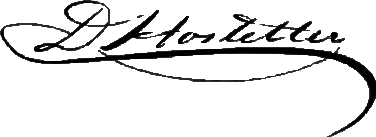

David Hostetter (1819–1888) was an American businessman and banker.

== Biography ==
=== Early life ===
David Hostetter was born in Lancaster County, Pennsylvania on January 23, 1819. He grew up on a farm.

=== Career ===
At the age of sixteen, he started working in a dry goods store in Lancaster, Pennsylvania. After seven years, he opened his own store.

In 1850, he moved to California for the California Gold Rush. He started a grocery business there, but lost everything in a fire. Back in Pennsylvania, he worked as a paymaster for McEvoy & Clark, a contractor of the railroad at Horseshoe Bend.

Together with his father, he developed the Hostetter's "Celebrated" Bitters. Shortly after, he became associated with George W. Smith and started the company, Hostetter & Smith; it later became known as Hostetter & Co. The bitters was used as patent medicine by Northern soldiers during the Civil War and served in saloons. The content was 47% alcohol with sugar.

He was also a co-founder of the Fort Pitt National Bank, where he served as President for fourteen years. He also sat on the board of directors of the Farmers' Deposit National Bank. Later, he was one of the founders of the Pittsburgh and Lake Erie Railroad, the Pittsburgh, McKeesport and Youghiogheny Railroad and the South Pennsylvania Railroad.

Additionally, he invested in the oil and gas industry. He served as President of the Pittsburgh Gas Company, sat on the board of directors of the East End Gas Company and the Consolidated Gas Company of Pittsburgh, and was a major shareholder of Allegheny Gasworks and the Fuel Gas Company of Allegheny County. In 1875, he built an oil pipeline from Pittsburgh to Millerstown, Pennsylvania, but after much opposition from the Pennsylvania Railroad Company and the Baltimore and Ohio Railroad Company, he sold his stake to Standard Oil in 1877.

He was a Republican and believed in tariffs.

=== Personal life ===
He married Rosetta Rickey, daughter of Randall Rickey of Cincinnati, on July 13, 1854. They had four sons and one daughter:

- Harry Hostetter.
- D. Herbert Hostetter.
- Theodore R. Hostetter (1870-1902).

He died in New York City on November 5, 1888.
