= Theodore R. Hostetter =

- Born: Theodore Rickey Hostetter; October 19, 1870; Allegheny County, Pennsylvania, US
- Died: August 3, 1902 (aged 31); New York City, US
- Occupations: Businessman, polo player, yachtsman
- Spouse: Allene Tew (m. 1891)
- Children: 3
- Parent(s): David Hostetter; Rosetta (Rickey) Hostetter

Theodore R. Hostetter (October 19, 1870 – August 3, 1902) was an American heir, businessman, polo player, and yachtsman during the Gilded Age.

== Early life ==
Theodore Rickey Hostetter was born in 1870, the youngest son of David Hostetter, a prominent Pittsburgh businessman and banker, and Rosetta (née Rickey) Hostetter. He had a brother, D. Herbert Hostetter. He attended public schools in Allegheny County, Pennsylvania, the Western University of Pennsylvania, and a college in New England.

== Career ==
His father died in 1888, and he inherited a considerable fortune. He served as Vice President of the Hostetter Company, his family's business. He also ran the East End Riding Academy.

At his death in 1902, his estate was valued at $1,349,196. It included shares of the Union Trust Company, the Pennsylvania Gas Coal Company, the Monongahela Coal Company, the Pittsburgh, Bessemer and Lake Erie Railroad, and the Hostetter Company.

== Gambling ==
Hostetter was well known for high-stakes gambling. For example, he won $30,000 on the 1896 United States presidential election, by betting on William McKinley. He also gambled and won on yacht races. Additionally, he would bet $1,000 a game on polo matches in Narragansett Pier.

After his death, it was reported that Hostetter had lost $1,000,000 in the last year, mostly to David C. Johnson, John Daly, and Richard Canfield. Reportedly, "[b]efore he was buried the gamblers who claimed that the young man owed them large sums called upon the widow to effect a settlement." Johnson sued Hostetter's widow and received $115,000.

== Personal life ==
In 1891, Hostetter married Allene Tew. The young couple had a country house, Raccoon Farm in Beaver County, Pennsylvania, a summer house in Narragansett Pier, Rhode Island, a winter cottage in South Carolina, and an apartment in New York City at 8 East 65th Street (later at the Waldorf Astoria Hotel).

Hostetter was an enthusiastic participant in many sports. He had a golf links at Raccoon Farm. He also built a polo field at Raccoon Farm, and played polo regularly. Additionally, he was an avid yachtsman. He was a member of the New York Yacht Club and the Columbia Boat Club.

Tod and Allene Hostetter had three children:

- Greta Hostetter (1892–1918), who married Glenn L. Stewart (1884–1957). She had her debut at Sherry's in 1911.
- Verna Hostetter (1893–1895), who died in early childhood.
- Theodore Rickey Hostetter Jr. (1897–1918), who was killed in World War I.

He died on August 3, 1902, at the age of 31. During a trip on his yacht Seneca to Larchmont, New York, to visit his brother Herbert, he contracted a cold which led to pneumonia. He died in his apartment at the Waldorf.

After his death, his widow remarried four times, including to Anson Wood Burchard, Prince Heinrich XXXIII Reuss of Köstritz, and Count Pavel de Kotzebue.
