= Ohio's congressional delegations =

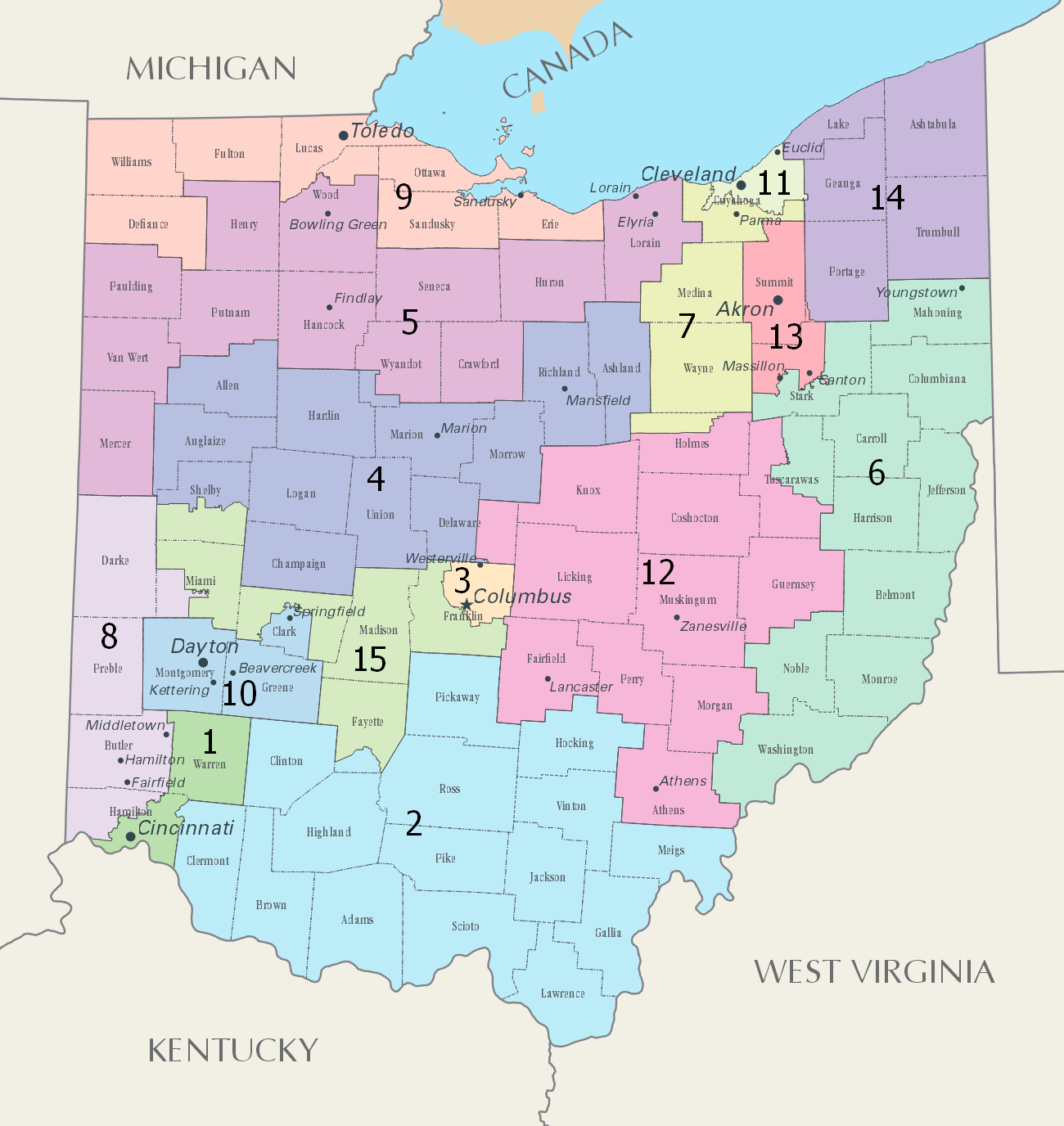
Ohio's congressional districts since 2022

These are tables of congressional delegations from Ohio to the United States House of Representatives and the United States Senate.

The current dean of the Ohio delegation is Representative Marcy Kaptur (OH-9), having served in the House since 1983.

== U.S. House of Representatives ==
=== Current members ===
This is a list of United States representatives from Ohio, their terms in office, district boundaries, and the district political ratings according to the CPVI. The delegation has a total of 15 members, with 10 Republicans and 5 Democrats.

Current U.S. representatives from Ohio
District	Member (Residence)	Party	Incumbent since	CPVI (2026)	District map
1st	Greg Landsman (Cincinnati)	Democratic	January 3, 2023	R+1	
2nd	Dave Taylor (Amelia)	Republican	January 3, 2025	R+21	
3rd	Joyce Beatty (Columbus)	Democratic	January 3, 2013	D+21	
4th	Jim Jordan (Urbana)	Republican	January 3, 2007	R+21	
5th	Bob Latta (Bowling Green)	Republican	December 11, 2007	R+12	
6th	Michael Rulli (Salem)	Republican	June 11, 2024	R+17	
7th	Max Miller (Rocky River)	Republican	January 3, 2023	R+5	
8th	Warren Davidson (Troy)	Republican	June 7, 2016	R+8	
9th	Marcy Kaptur (Toledo)	Democratic	January 3, 1983	R+5	
10th	Mike Turner (Dayton)	Republican	January 3, 2003	R+4	
11th	Shontel Brown (Warrensville Heights)	Democratic	November 4, 2021	D+28	
12th	Troy Balderson (Zanesville)	Republican	September 5, 2018	R+15	
13th	Emilia Sykes (Akron)	Democratic	January 3, 2023	D+2	
14th	Dave Joyce (South Russell)	Republican	January 3, 2013	R+10	
15th	Mike Carey (Columbus)	Republican	November 4, 2021	R+5	

=== 1803–1813: One seat ===
After statehood, Ohio had one representative, elected statewide at-large.

Congress	Representative At-large
8th (1803–1805)	Jeremiah Morrow (DR)
9th (1805–1807)	Jeremiah Morrow (DR)
10th (1807–1809)	Jeremiah Morrow (DR)
11th (1809–1811)	Jeremiah Morrow (DR Quid)
12th (1811–1813)	Jeremiah Morrow (DR)

=== 1813–1823: 6 seats ===
Six seats were apportioned by districts.

Congress	1st district	2nd district	3rd district	4th district	5th district	6th district
13th (1813–1815)	John; McLean (DR)	John; Alexander (DR)	Duncan McArthur (DR)	James; Caldwell (DR)	James; Kilbourne (DR)	Reasin Beall (DR)
13th (1813–1815)	John; McLean (DR)	John; Alexander (DR)	William; Creighton Jr. (DR)	James; Caldwell (DR)	James; Kilbourne (DR)	David; Clendenin (DR)
14th (1815–1817)	John; McLean (DR)	John; Alexander (DR)	William; Creighton Jr. (DR)	James; Caldwell (DR)	James; Kilbourne (DR)	David; Clendenin (DR)
14th (1815–1817)	William Henry; Harrison (DR)	John; Alexander (DR)	William; Creighton Jr. (DR)	James; Caldwell (DR)	James; Kilbourne (DR)	David; Clendenin (DR)
15th (1817–1819)	William Henry; Harrison (DR)	John Wilson; Campbell (DR)	Levi Barber (DR)	Samuel; Herrick (DR)	Philemon; Beecher (DR)	Peter Hitchcock (DR)
16th (1819–1821)	Thomas R. Ross (DR)	John Wilson; Campbell (DR)	Henry Brush (DR)	Samuel; Herrick (DR)	Philemon; Beecher (DR)	John Sloane (DR)
17th (1821–1823)	Thomas R. Ross (DR)	John Wilson; Campbell (DR)	Levi Barber (DR)	David Chambers (DR)	Joseph Vance (DR)	John Sloane (DR)

=== 1823–1833: 14 seats ===
Congress	District													
Congress	1st	2nd	3rd	4th	5th	6th	7th	8th	9th	10th	11th	12th	13th	14th
18th (1823–1825)	James W. Gazlay (DR) (Note: Supported the Jackson faction in the 1824 United States presidential election)	Thomas R. Ross (DR) (Note: Supported the Crawford faction in the 1824 United States presidential election)	William; McLean (DR) (Note: Supported the Adams-Clay faction in the 1824 United States presidential election)	Joseph; Vance (DR)	John Wilson; Campbell (DR)	Duncan; McArthur (DR)	Samuel F. Vinton (DR)	William; Wilson (DR)	Philemon; Beecher (DR)	John; Patterson (DR)	John C. Wright (DR)	John; Sloane (DR)	Elisha; Whittlesey (DR)	Mordecai; Bartley (DR)
19th (1825–1827)	James; Findlay (J)	John; Woods (NR)	William; McLean (NR)	Joseph; Vance (NR)	John Wilson; Campbell (NR)	John Thomson (J)	Samuel F. Vinton (NR)	William; Wilson (NR)	Philemon; Beecher (NR)	David Jennings (NR)	John C. Wright (NR)	John; Sloane (NR)	Elisha; Whittlesey (NR)	Mordecai; Bartley (NR)
19th (1825–1827)	James; Findlay (J)	John; Woods (NR)	William; McLean (NR)	Joseph; Vance (NR)	John Wilson; Campbell (NR)	John Thomson (J)	Samuel F. Vinton (NR)	William; Wilson (NR)	Philemon; Beecher (NR)	Thomas Shannon (NR)	John C. Wright (NR)	John; Sloane (NR)	Elisha; Whittlesey (NR)	Mordecai; Bartley (NR)
20th (1827–1829)	James; Findlay (J)	John; Woods (NR)	William; McLean (NR)	Joseph; Vance (NR)	William; Russell (J)	William; Creighton (NR)	Samuel F. Vinton (NR)	William; Wilson (NR)	Philemon; Beecher (NR)	John; Davenport (NR)	John C. Wright (NR)	John; Sloane (NR)	Elisha; Whittlesey (NR)	Mordecai; Bartley (NR)
20th (1827–1829)	James; Findlay (J)	John; Woods (NR)	William; McLean (NR)	Joseph; Vance (NR)	William; Russell (J)	Francis Swaine; Muhlenberg (NR)	Samuel F. Vinton (NR)	William; Stanbery (J)	Philemon; Beecher (NR)	John; Davenport (NR)	John C. Wright (NR)	John; Sloane (NR)	Elisha; Whittlesey (NR)	Mordecai; Bartley (NR)
21st (1829–1831)	James; Findlay (J)	James; Shields (J)	Joseph H. Crane (NR)	Joseph; Vance (NR)	William; Russell (J)	William; Creighton Jr. (NR)	Samuel F. Vinton (NR)	William; Stanbery (J)	William W. Irvin (J)	William; Kennon Sr. (J)	John M. Goodenow (J)	John; Thomson (J)	Elisha; Whittlesey (NR)	Mordecai; Bartley (NR)
21st (1829–1831)	James; Findlay (J)	James; Shields (J)	Joseph H. Crane (NR)	Joseph; Vance (NR)	William; Russell (J)	William; Creighton Jr. (NR)	Samuel F. Vinton (NR)	William; Stanbery (J)	William W. Irvin (J)	William; Kennon Sr. (J)	Humphrey H. Leavitt (J)	John; Thomson (J)	Elisha; Whittlesey (NR)	Mordecai; Bartley (NR)
22nd (1831–1833)	James; Findlay (J)	Thomas; Corwin (NR)	Joseph H. Crane (NR)	Joseph; Vance (NR)	William; Russell (J)	William; Creighton Jr. (NR)	Samuel F. Vinton (NR)	William; Stanbery (NR)	William W. Irvin (J)	William; Kennon Sr. (J)	Humphrey H. Leavitt (J)	John; Thomson (J)	Elisha; Whittlesey (NR)	Eleutheros; Cooke (NR)

=== 1833–1843: 19 seats ===
Congress	District										District								
Congress	1st	2nd	3rd	4th	5th	6th	7th	8th	9th	10th	11th	12th	13th	14th	15th	16th	17th	18th	19th
23rd (1833–1835)	Robert Todd Lytle (J)	Taylor Webster (J)	Joseph H. Crane (NR)	Thomas Corwin (NR)	Thomas L. Hamer (J)	Samuel F. Vinton (NR)	William Allen (J)	Jeremiah McLene (J)	John Chaney (J)	Joseph Vance (NR)	James M. Bell (NR)	Robert Mitchell (J)	David Spangler (NR)	William Patterson (J)	Jonathan Sloane (A-M)	Elisha Whittlesey (A-M)	John Thomson (J)	Benjamin Jones (J)	Humphrey H. Leavitt (J)
23rd (1833–1835)	Robert Todd Lytle (J)	Taylor Webster (J)	Joseph H. Crane (NR)	Thomas Corwin (NR)	Thomas L. Hamer (J)	Samuel F. Vinton (NR)	William Allen (J)	Jeremiah McLene (J)	John Chaney (J)	Joseph Vance (NR)	James M. Bell (NR)	Robert Mitchell (J)	David Spangler (NR)	William Patterson (J)	Jonathan Sloane (A-M)	Elisha Whittlesey (A-M)	John Thomson (J)	Benjamin Jones (J)	Daniel Kilgore (J)
24th (1835–1837)	Bellamy Storer (NR)	Taylor Webster (J)	Joseph H. Crane (NR)	Thomas Corwin (NR)	Thomas L. Hamer (J)	Samuel F. Vinton (NR)	William K. Bond (NR)	Jeremiah McLene (J)	John Chaney (J)	Samson Mason (NR)	William Kennon Sr. (J)	Elias Howell (NR)	David Spangler (NR)	William Patterson (J)	Jonathan Sloane (A-M)	Elisha Whittlesey (NR)	John Thomson (J)	Benjamin Jones (J)	Daniel Kilgore (J)
25th (1837–1839)	Alexander Duncan (D)	Taylor Webster (D)	Patrick Gaines Goode (W)	Thomas Corwin (W)	Thomas L. Hamer (D)	Calvary Morris (W)	William K. Bond (W)	Joseph Ridgway (W)	John Chaney (D)	Samson Mason (W)	James Alexander Jr. (W)	Alexander Harper (W)	Daniel P. Leadbetter (D)	William H. Hunter (D)	John W. Allen (W)	Elisha Whittlesey (W)	Andrew W. Loomis (W)	Matthias Shepler (D)	Daniel Kilgore (D)
25th (1837–1839)	Alexander Duncan (D)	Taylor Webster (D)	Patrick Gaines Goode (W)	Thomas Corwin (W)	Thomas L. Hamer (D)	Calvary Morris (W)	William K. Bond (W)	Joseph Ridgway (W)	John Chaney (D)	Samson Mason (W)	James Alexander Jr. (W)	Alexander Harper (W)	Daniel P. Leadbetter (D)	William H. Hunter (D)	John W. Allen (W)	Joshua Reed Giddings (W)	Charles D. Coffin (W)	Matthias Shepler (D)	Henry Swearingen (D)
26th (1839–1841)	Alexander Duncan (D)	John B. Weller (D)	Patrick Gaines Goode (W)	Thomas Corwin (W)	William Doan (D)	Calvary Morris (W)	William K. Bond (W)	Joseph Ridgway (W)	William Medill (D)	Samson Mason (W)	Isaac Parrish (D)	Jonathan Taylor (D)	Daniel P. Leadbetter (D)	George Sweeny (D)	John W. Allen (W)	Joshua Reed Giddings (W)	John Hastings (D)	David A. Starkweather (D)	Henry Swearingen (D)
26th (1839–1841)	Alexander Duncan (D)	John B. Weller (D)	Patrick Gaines Goode (W)	Jeremiah Morrow (W)	William Doan (D)	Calvary Morris (W)	William K. Bond (W)	Joseph Ridgway (W)	William Medill (D)	Samson Mason (W)	Isaac Parrish (D)	Jonathan Taylor (D)	Daniel P. Leadbetter (D)	George Sweeny (D)	John W. Allen (W)	Joshua Reed Giddings (W)	John Hastings (D)	David A. Starkweather (D)	Henry Swearingen (D)
27th (1841–1843)	Nathanael G. Pendleton (W)	John B. Weller (D)	Patrick Gaines Goode (W)	Jeremiah Morrow (W)	William Doan (D)	Calvary Morris (W)	William Russell (W)	Joseph Ridgway (W)	William Medill (D)	Samson Mason (W)	Benjamin S. Cowen (W)	Joshua Mathiot (W)	James Mathews (D)	George Sweeny (D)	Sherlock J. Andrews (W)	Joshua Reed Giddings (W)	John Hastings (D)	Ezra Dean (D)	Samuel Stokely (W)

=== 1843–1863: 21 seats ===
Congress	District										District										
Congress	1st	2nd	3rd	4th	5th	6th	7th	8th	9th	10th	11th	12th	13th	14th	15th	16th	17th	18th	19th	20th	21st
28th (1843–1845)	Alexander Duncan (D)	John B. Weller (D)	Robert C. Schenck (W)	Joseph Vance (W)	Emery D. Potter (D)	Henry St. John (D)	Joseph J. McDowell (D)	John I. Vanmeter (W)	Elias Florence (W)	Heman A. Moore (D)	Jacob Brinkerhoff (D)	Samuel F. Vinton (W)	Perley B. Johnson (W)	Alexander Harper (W)	Joseph Morris (D)	James Mathews (D)	William C. McCauslen (D)	Ezra Dean (D)	Daniel R. Tilden (W)	Joshua Reed Giddings (W)	Henry R. Brinkerhoff (D)
28th (1843–1845)	Alexander Duncan (D)	John B. Weller (D)	Robert C. Schenck (W)	Joseph Vance (W)	Emery D. Potter (D)	Henry St. John (D)	Joseph J. McDowell (D)	John I. Vanmeter (W)	Elias Florence (W)	Alfred P. Stone (D)	Jacob Brinkerhoff (D)	Samuel F. Vinton (W)	Perley B. Johnson (W)	Alexander Harper (W)	Joseph Morris (D)	James Mathews (D)	William C. McCauslen (D)	Ezra Dean (D)	Daniel R. Tilden (W)	Joshua Reed Giddings (W)	Edward Hamlin (W)
29th (1845–1847)	James J. Faran (D)	Francis A. Cunningham (D)	Robert C. Schenck (W)	Joseph Vance (W)	William Sawyer (D)	Henry St. John (D)	Joseph J. McDowell (D)	Allen G. Thurman (D)	Augustus L. Perrill (D)	Columbus Delano (W)	Jacob Brinkerhoff (D)	Samuel F. Vinton (W)	Isaac Parrish (D)	Alexander Harper (W)	Joseph Morris (D)	John D. Cummins (D)	George Fries (D)	David A. Starkweather (D)	Daniel R. Tilden (W)	Joshua Reed Giddings (W)	Joseph M. Root (W)
30th (1847–1849)	James J. Faran (D)	David Fisher (W)	Robert C. Schenck (W)	Richard S. Canby (W)	William Sawyer (D)	Rodolphus Dickinson (D)	Jonathan D. Morris (D)	John L. Taylor (W)	Thomas Edwards (W)	Daniel Duncan (W)	John K. Miller (D)	Samuel F. Vinton (W)	Thomas Ritchey (D)	Nathan Evans (W)	William Kennon Jr. (D)	John D. Cummins (D)	George Fries (D)	Samuel Lahm (D)	John Crowell (W)	Joshua Reed Giddings (W)	Joseph M. Root (W)
31st (1849–1851)	David T. Disney (D)	Lewis D. Campbell (W)	Robert C. Schenck (W)	Moses Bledso Corwin (W)	Emery D. Potter (D)	Rodolphus Dickinson (D)	Jonathan D. Morris (D)	John L. Taylor (W)	Edson B. Olds (D)	Charles Sweetser (D)	John K. Miller (D)	Samuel F. Vinton (W)	William A. Whittlesey (D)	Nathan Evans (W)	William F. Hunter (W)	Moses Hoagland (D)	Joseph Cable (D)	David Kellogg Cartter (D)	John Crowell (W)	Joshua Reed Giddings (FS)	Joseph M. Root (FS)
31st (1849–1851)	David T. Disney (D)	Lewis D. Campbell (W)	Robert C. Schenck (W)	Moses Bledso Corwin (W)	Emery D. Potter (D)	Amos E. Wood (D)	Jonathan D. Morris (D)	John L. Taylor (W)	Edson B. Olds (D)	Charles Sweetser (D)	John K. Miller (D)	Samuel F. Vinton (W)	William A. Whittlesey (D)	Nathan Evans (W)	William F. Hunter (W)	Moses Hoagland (D)	Joseph Cable (D)	David Kellogg Cartter (D)	John Crowell (W)	Joshua Reed Giddings (FS)	Joseph M. Root (FS)
31st (1849–1851)	David T. Disney (D)	Lewis D. Campbell (W)	Robert C. Schenck (W)	Moses Bledso Corwin (W)	Emery D. Potter (D)	John Bell (W)	Jonathan D. Morris (D)	John L. Taylor (W)	Edson B. Olds (D)	Charles Sweetser (D)	John K. Miller (D)	Samuel F. Vinton (W)	William A. Whittlesey (D)	Nathan Evans (W)	William F. Hunter (W)	Moses Hoagland (D)	Joseph Cable (D)	David Kellogg Cartter (D)	John Crowell (W)	Joshua Reed Giddings (FS)	Joseph M. Root (FS)
32nd (1851–1853)	David T. Disney (D)	Lewis D. Campbell (W)	Hiram Bell (W)	Benjamin Stanton (W)	Alfred Peck Edgerton (D)	Frederick W. Green (D)	Nelson Barrere (W)	John L. Taylor (W)	Edson B. Olds (D)	Charles Sweetser (D)	George H. Busby (D)	John Welch (W)	James M. Gaylord (D)	Alexander Harper (W)	William F. Hunter (W)	John Johnson (ID)	Joseph Cable (D)	David Kellogg Cartter (D)	Eben Newton (W)	Joshua Reed Giddings (FS)	Norton Townshend (D)
33rd (1853–1855)	David T. Disney (D)	John Scott Harrison (W)	Lewis D. Campbell (W)	Matthias Nichols (D)	Alfred Peck Edgerton (D)	Andrew Ellison (D)	Aaron Harlan (W)	Moses Corwin (W)	Frederick W. Green (D)	John L. Taylor (W)	Thomas Ritchey (D)	Edson B. Olds (D)	William D. Lindsley (D)	Harvey H. Johnson (D)	William R. Sapp (W)	Edward Ball (W)	Wilson Shannon (D)	George Bliss (D)	Edward Wade (FS)	Joshua Reed Giddings (FS)	Andrew Stuart (D)
34th (1855–1857)	Timothy C. Day (A-N)	John Scott Harrison (A-N)	Lewis D. Campbell (A-N)	Matthias Nichols (A-N)	Richard Mott (A-N)	Jonas R. Emrie (A-N)	Aaron Harlan (A-N)	Benjamin Stanton (A-N)	Cooper K. Watson (A-N)	Oscar F. Moore (A-N)	Valentine Horton (A-N)	Samuel Galloway (A-N)	John Sherman (A-N)	Philemon Bliss (A-N)	William R. Sapp (A-N)	Edward Ball (A-N)	Charles J. Albright (A-N)	Benjamin F. Leiter (A-N)	Edward Wade (A-N)	Joshua Reed Giddings (A-N)	John Bingham (A-N)
35th (1857–1859)	George H. Pendleton (D)	William S. Groesbeck (D)	Lewis D. Campbell (R)	Matthias H. Nichols (R)	Richard Mott (R)	Joseph R. Cockerill (D)	Aaron Harlan (R)	Benjamin Stanton (R)	Lawrence W. Hall (D)	Joseph Miller (D)	Valentine B. Horton (R)	Samuel S. Cox (D)	John Sherman (R)	Philemon Bliss (R)	Joseph Burns (D)	Cydnor B. Tompkins (R)	William Lawrence (D)	Benjamin F. Leiter (R)	Edward Wade (R)	Joshua Reed Giddings (R)	John Bingham (R)
35th (1857–1859)	George H. Pendleton (D)	William S. Groesbeck (D)	Clement Vallandigham (D)	Matthias H. Nichols (R)	Richard Mott (R)	Joseph R. Cockerill (D)	Aaron Harlan (R)	Benjamin Stanton (R)	Lawrence W. Hall (D)	Joseph Miller (D)	Valentine B. Horton (R)	Samuel S. Cox (D)	John Sherman (R)	Philemon Bliss (R)	Joseph Burns (D)	Cydnor B. Tompkins (R)	William Lawrence (D)	Benjamin F. Leiter (R)	Edward Wade (R)	Joshua Reed Giddings (R)	John Bingham (R)
36th (1859–1861)	George H. Pendleton (D)	John A. Gurley (R)	Clement Vallandigham (D)	William Allen (D)	James Mitchell Ashley (R)	William Howard (D)	Thomas Corwin (R)	Benjamin Stanton (R)	John Carey (R)	Carey A. Trimble (R)	Charles D. Martin (D)	Samuel S. Cox (D)	John Sherman (R)	Cyrus Spink (R)	William Helmick (R)	Cydnor B. Tompkins (R)	Thomas Clarke Theaker (R)	Sidney Edgerton (R)	Edward Wade (R)	John Hutchins (R)	John Bingham (R)
36th (1859–1861)	George H. Pendleton (D)	John A. Gurley (R)	Clement Vallandigham (D)	William Allen (D)	James Mitchell Ashley (R)	William Howard (D)	Thomas Corwin (R)	Benjamin Stanton (R)	John Carey (R)	Carey A. Trimble (R)	Charles D. Martin (D)	Samuel S. Cox (D)	John Sherman (R)	Harrison G. O. Blake (R)	William Helmick (R)	Cydnor B. Tompkins (R)	Thomas Clarke Theaker (R)	Sidney Edgerton (R)	Edward Wade (R)	John Hutchins (R)	John Bingham (R)
37th (1861–1863)	George H. Pendleton (D)	John A. Gurley (R)	Clement Vallandigham (D)	William Allen (D)	James Mitchell Ashley (R)	Chilton A. White (D)	Thomas Corwin (R)	Samuel Shellabarger (R)	Warren P. Noble (D)	Carey A. Trimble (R)	Valentine B. Horton (R)	Samuel S. Cox (D)	John Sherman (R)	Harrison G. O. Blake (R)	Robert H. Nugen (D)	William P. Cutler (R)	James R. Morris (D)	Sidney Edgerton (R)	Albert G. Riddle (R)	John Hutchins (R)	John Bingham (R)
37th (1861–1863)	George H. Pendleton (D)	John A. Gurley (R)	Clement Vallandigham (D)	William Allen (D)	James Mitchell Ashley (R)	Chilton A. White (D)	Richard Harrison (U)	Samuel Shellabarger (R)	Warren P. Noble (D)	Carey A. Trimble (R)	Valentine B. Horton (R)	Samuel S. Cox (D)	Samuel T. Worcester (R)	Harrison G. O. Blake (R)	Robert H. Nugen (D)	William P. Cutler (R)	James R. Morris (D)	Sidney Edgerton (R)	Albert G. Riddle (R)	John Hutchins (R)	John Bingham (R)

=== 1863–1873: 19 seats ===
Congress	District																		
Congress	1st	2nd	3rd	4th	5th	6th	7th	8th	9th	10th	11th	12th	13th	14th	15th	16th	17th	18th	19th
38th (1863–1865)	George H. Pendleton (D)	Alexander Long (D)	Robert C. Schenck (R)	John F. McKinney (D)	Francis Celeste Le Blond (D)	Chilton A. White (D)	Samuel S. Cox (D)	William Johnston (D)	Warren P. Noble (D)	James Mitchell Ashley (R)	Wells A. Hutchins (D)	William E. Finck (D)	John O'Neill (D)	George Bliss (D)	James R. Morris (D)	Joseph W. White (D)	Ephraim R. Eckley (R)	Rufus P. Spalding (R)	James A. Garfield (R)
39th (1865–1867)	Benjamin Eggleston (R)	Rutherford B. Hayes (R)	Robert C. Schenck (R)	William Lawrence (R)	Francis Celeste Le Blond (D)	Reader W. Clarke (R)	Samuel Shellabarger (R)	James R. Hubbell (R)	Ralph Pomeroy Buckland (R)	James Mitchell Ashley (R)	Hezekiah S. Bundy (R)	William E. Finck (D)	Columbus Delano (R)	Martin Welker (R)	Tobias A. Plants (R)	John Bingham (R)	Ephraim R. Eckley (R)	Rufus P. Spalding (R)	James A. Garfield (R)
40th (1867–1869)	Benjamin Eggleston (R)	Rutherford B. Hayes (R)	Robert C. Schenck (R)	William Lawrence (R)	William Mungen (D)	Reader W. Clarke (R)	Samuel Shellabarger (R)	Cornelius S. Hamilton (R)	Ralph Pomeroy Buckland (R)	James Mitchell Ashley (R)	John Thomas Wilson (R)	Philadelph Van Trump (D)	George W. Morgan (D)	Martin Welker (R)	Tobias A. Plants (R)	John Bingham (R)	Ephraim R. Eckley (R)	Rufus P. Spalding (R)	James A. Garfield (R)
40th (1867–1869)	Benjamin Eggleston (R)	Samuel F. Cary (IR)	Robert C. Schenck (R)	William Lawrence (R)	William Mungen (D)	Reader W. Clarke (R)	Samuel Shellabarger (R)	John Beatty (R)	Ralph Pomeroy Buckland (R)	James Mitchell Ashley (R)	John Thomas Wilson (R)	Philadelph Van Trump (D)	Columbus Delano (R)	Martin Welker (R)	Tobias A. Plants (R)	John Bingham (R)	Ephraim R. Eckley (R)	Rufus P. Spalding (R)	James A. Garfield (R)
41st (1869–1871)	Peter W. Strader (D)	Job E. Stevenson (R)	Robert C. Schenck (R)	William Lawrence (R)	William Mungen (D)	John A. Smith (R)	James J. Winans (R)	John Beatty (R)	Edward F. Dickinson (D)	Truman H. Hoag (D)	John Thomas Wilson (R)	Philadelph Van Trump (D)	George W. Morgan (D)	Martin Welker (R)	Eliakim H. Moore (R)	John Bingham (R)	Jacob A. Ambler (R)	William H. Upson (R)	James A. Garfield (R)
41st (1869–1871)	Peter W. Strader (D)	Job E. Stevenson (R)	Robert C. Schenck (R)	William Lawrence (R)	William Mungen (D)	John A. Smith (R)	James J. Winans (R)	John Beatty (R)	Edward F. Dickinson (D)	Erasmus D. Peck (R)	John Thomas Wilson (R)	Philadelph Van Trump (D)	George W. Morgan (D)	Martin Welker (R)	Eliakim H. Moore (R)	John Bingham (R)	Jacob A. Ambler (R)	William H. Upson (R)	James A. Garfield (R)
42nd (1871–1873)	Aaron F. Perry (R)	Job E. Stevenson (R)	Lewis D. Campbell (D)	John F. McKinney (D)	Charles N. Lamison (D)	John A. Smith (R)	Samuel Shellabarger (R)	John Beatty (R)	Charles Foster (R)	Erasmus D. Peck (R)	John Thomas Wilson (R)	Philadelph Van Trump (D)	George W. Morgan (D)	James Monroe (R)	William P. Sprague (R)	John Bingham (R)	Jacob A. Ambler (R)	William H. Upson (R)	James A. Garfield (R)
42nd (1871–1873)	Ozro J. Dodds (D)	Job E. Stevenson (R)	Lewis D. Campbell (D)	John F. McKinney (D)	Charles N. Lamison (D)	John A. Smith (R)	Samuel Shellabarger (R)	John Beatty (R)	Charles Foster (R)	Erasmus D. Peck (R)	John Thomas Wilson (R)	Philadelph Van Trump (D)	George W. Morgan (D)	James Monroe (R)	William P. Sprague (R)	John Bingham (R)	Jacob A. Ambler (R)	William H. Upson (R)	James A. Garfield (R)

=== 1873–1883: 20 seats ===
Congress	District																			
Congress	1st	2nd	3rd	4th	5th	6th	7th	8th	9th	10th	11th	12th	13th	14th	15th	16th	17th	18th	19th	20th
43rd (1873–1875)	Milton Sayler (D)	Henry B. Banning (LR)	John Quincy Smith (R)	Lewis B. Gunckel (R)	Charles N. Lamison (D)	Isaac R. Sherwood (R)	Lawrence T. Neal (D)	William Lawrence (R)	James Wallace Robinson (R)	Charles Foster (R)	Hezekiah S. Bundy (R)	Hugh J. Jewett (D)	Milton I. Southard (D)	John Berry (D)	William P. Sprague (R)	Lorenzo Danford (R)	Laurin D. Woodworth (R)	James Monroe (R)	James A. Garfield (R)	Richard C. Parsons (R)
43rd (1873–1875)	Milton Sayler (D)	Henry B. Banning (LR)	John Quincy Smith (R)	Lewis B. Gunckel (R)	Charles N. Lamison (D)	Isaac R. Sherwood (R)	Lawrence T. Neal (D)	William Lawrence (R)	James Wallace Robinson (R)	Charles Foster (R)	Hezekiah S. Bundy (R)	William E. Finck (D)	Milton I. Southard (D)	John Berry (D)	William P. Sprague (R)	Lorenzo Danford (R)	Laurin D. Woodworth (R)	James Monroe (R)	James A. Garfield (R)	Richard C. Parsons (R)
44th (1875–1877)	Milton Sayler (D)	Henry B. Banning (D)	John S. Savage (D)	John A. McMahon (D)	Americus V. Rice (D)	Frank H. Hurd (D)	Lawrence T. Neal (D)	William Lawrence (R)	Earley F. Poppleton (D)	Charles Foster (R)	John L. Vance (D)	Ansel T. Walling (D)	Milton I. Southard (D)	Jacob Pitzer Cowan (D)	Nelson H. Van Vorhes (R)	Lorenzo Danford (R)	Laurin D. Woodworth (R)	James Monroe (R)	James A. Garfield (R)	Henry B. Payne (D)
45th (1877–1879)	Milton Sayler (D)	Henry B. Banning (D)	Mills Gardner (R)	John A. McMahon (D)	Americus V. Rice (D)	Jacob Dolson Cox (R)	Henry L. Dickey (D)	J. Warren Keifer (R)	John S. Jones (R)	Charles Foster (R)	Henry S. Neal (R)	Thomas Ewing Jr. (D)	Milton I. Southard (D)	Ebenezer B. Finley (D)	Nelson H. Van Vorhes (R)	Lorenzo Danford (R)	William McKinley (R)	James Monroe (R)	James A. Garfield (R)	Amos Townsend (R)
46th (1879–1881)	Benjamin Butterworth (R)	Thomas L. Young (R)	John A. McMahon (D)	J. Warren Keifer (R)	Benjamin Le Fevre (D)	William D. Hill (D)	Frank H. Hurd (D)	Ebenezer B. Finley (D)	George L. Converse (D)	Thomas Ewing Jr. (D)	Henry L. Dickey (D)	Henry S. Neal (R)	Adoniram J. Warner (D)	Gibson Atherton (D)	George W. Geddes (D)	William McKinley (R)	James Monroe (R)	Jonathan Updegraff (R)	James A. Garfield (R)	Amos Townsend (R)
46th (1879–1881)	Benjamin Butterworth (R)	Thomas L. Young (R)	John A. McMahon (D)	J. Warren Keifer (R)	Benjamin Le Fevre (D)	William D. Hill (D)	Frank H. Hurd (D)	Ebenezer B. Finley (D)	George L. Converse (D)	Thomas Ewing Jr. (D)	Henry L. Dickey (D)	Henry S. Neal (R)	Adoniram J. Warner (D)	Gibson Atherton (D)	George W. Geddes (D)	William McKinley (R)	James Monroe (R)	Jonathan Updegraff (R)	Ezra B. Taylor (R)	Amos Townsend (R)
47th (1881–1883)	Benjamin Butterworth (R)	Thomas L. Young (R)	Henry L. Morey (R)	Emanuel Shultz (R)	Benjamin Le Fevre (D)	James M. Ritchie (R)	John P. Leedom (D)	J. Warren Keifer (R)	James S. Robinson (R)	John B. Rice (R)	Henry S. Neal (R)	George L. Converse (D)	Gibson Atherton (D)	George W. Geddes (D)	Rufus Dawes (R)	Jonathan Updegraff (R)	William McKinley (R)	Addison S. McClure (R)	Ezra B. Taylor (R)	Amos Townsend (R)
47th (1881–1883)	Benjamin Butterworth (R)	Thomas L. Young (R)	Henry L. Morey (R)	Emanuel Shultz (R)	Benjamin Le Fevre (D)	James M. Ritchie (R)	John P. Leedom (D)	J. Warren Keifer (R)	James S. Robinson (R)	John B. Rice (R)	Henry S. Neal (R)	George L. Converse (D)	Gibson Atherton (D)	George W. Geddes (D)	Rufus Dawes (R)	Joseph D. Taylor (R)	William McKinley (R)	Addison S. McClure (R)	Ezra B. Taylor (R)	Amos Townsend (R)

=== 1883–1913: 21 seats ===
Congress	District										District										
Congress	1st	2nd	3rd	4th	5th	6th	7th	8th	9th	10th	11th	12th	13th	14th	15th	16th	17th	18th	19th	20th	21st
48th (1883–1885)	John F. Follett (D)	Isaac M. Jordan (D)	Robert Maynard Murray (D)	Benjamin Le Fevre (D)	George E. Seney (D)	William D. Hill (D)	Henry L. Morey (R)	J. Warren Keifer (R)	James S. Robinson (R)	Frank H. Hurd (D)	John W. McCormick (R)	Alphonso Hart (R)	George L. Converse (D)	George W. Geddes (D)	Adoniram J. Warner (D)	Beriah Wilkins (D)	Joseph D. Taylor (R)	William McKinley (R)	Ezra B. Taylor (R)	David R. Paige (D)	Martin A. Foran (D)
48th (1883–1885)	John F. Follett (D)	Isaac M. Jordan (D)	Robert Maynard Murray (D)	Benjamin Le Fevre (D)	George E. Seney (D)	William D. Hill (D)	James E. Campbell (D)	J. Warren Keifer (R)	James S. Robinson (R)	Frank H. Hurd (D)	John W. McCormick (R)	Alphonso Hart (R)	George L. Converse (D)	George W. Geddes (D)	Adoniram J. Warner (D)	Beriah Wilkins (D)	Joseph D. Taylor (R)	Jonathan Wallace (D)	Ezra B. Taylor (R)	David R. Paige (D)	Martin A. Foran (D)
49th (1885–1887)	Benjamin Butterworth (R)	Charles Elwood Brown (R)	James E. Campbell (D)	Charles Anderson (D)	Benjamin Le Fevre (D)	William D. Hill (D)	George E. Seney (D)	John Little (R)	William C. Cooper (R)	Jacob Romeis (R)	William W. Ellsberry (D)	Albert C. Thompson (R)	Joseph H. Outhwaite (D)	Charles H. Grosvenor (R)	Beriah Wilkins (D)	George Geddes (D)	Adoniram J. Warner (D)	Isaac H. Taylor (R)	Ezra B. Taylor (R)	William McKinley (R)	Martin A. Foran (D)
50th (1887–1889)	Benjamin Butterworth (R)	Charles Elwood Brown (R)	Elihu S. Williams (R)	Samuel S. Yoder (D)	George E. Seney (D)	Melvin M. Boothman (R)	James E. Campbell (D)	Robert P. Kennedy (R)	William C. Cooper (R)	Jacob Romeis (R)	Albert C. Thompson (R)	Jacob J. Pugsley (R)	Joseph H. Outhwaite (D)	Charles Preston Wickham (R)	Charles H. Grosvenor (R)	Beriah Wilkins (D)	Joseph D. Taylor (R)	William McKinley (R)	Ezra B. Taylor (R)	George Crouse (R)	Martin A. Foran (D)
51st (1889–1891)	Benjamin Butterworth (R)	John A. Caldwell (R)	Elihu S. Williams (R)	Samuel S. Yoder (D)	George E. Seney (D)	Melvin M. Boothman (R)	Henry Lee Morey (R)	Robert P. Kennedy (R)	William C. Cooper (R)	William Haynes (D)	Albert C. Thompson (R)	Jacob J. Pugsley (R)	Joseph H. Outhwaite (D)	Charles Preston Wickham (R)	Charles H. Grosvenor (R)	James Owens (D)	Joseph D. Taylor (R)	William McKinley (R)	Ezra B. Taylor (R)	Martin L. Smyser (R)	Theodore E. Burton (R)
52nd (1891–1893)	Bellamy Storer (R)	John A. Caldwell (R)	George W. Houk (D)	Martin K. Gantz (D)	Fernando C. Layton (D)	Dennis D. Donovan (D)	William E. Haynes (D)	Darius D. Hare (D)	Joseph H. Outhwaite (D)	Robert E. Doan (R)	John M. Pattison (D)	William Enochs (R)	James I. Dungan (D)	James W. Owens (D)	Michael D. Harter (D)	John G. Warwick (D)	Albert J. Pearson (D)	Joseph D. Taylor (R)	Ezra B. Taylor (R)	Vincent A. Taylor (R)	Tom L. Johnson (D)
52nd (1891–1893)	Bellamy Storer (R)	John A. Caldwell (R)	George W. Houk (D)	Martin K. Gantz (D)	Fernando C. Layton (D)	Dennis D. Donovan (D)	William E. Haynes (D)	Darius D. Hare (D)	Joseph H. Outhwaite (D)	Robert E. Doan (R)	John M. Pattison (D)	William Enochs (R)	James I. Dungan (D)	James W. Owens (D)	Michael D. Harter (D)	Lewis P. Ohliger (D)	Albert J. Pearson (D)	Joseph D. Taylor (R)	Ezra B. Taylor (R)	Vincent A. Taylor (R)	Tom L. Johnson (D)
53rd (1893–1895)	Bellamy Storer (R)	John A. Caldwell (R)	George W. Houk (D)	Fernando C. Layton (D)	Dennis D. Donovan (D)	George W. Hulick (R)	George W. Wilson (R)	Luther M. Strong (R)	Byron F. Ritchie (D)	William Enochs (R)	Charles H. Grosvenor (R)	Joseph H. Outhwaite (D)	Darius D. Hare (D)	Michael D. Harter (D)	H. Clay Van Voorhis (R)	Albert J. Pearson (D)	James A. D. Richards (D)	George P. Ikirt (D)	Stephen A. Northway (R)	William J. White (R)	Tom L. Johnson (D)
53rd (1893–1895)	Bellamy Storer (R)	Jacob H. Bromwell (R)	Paul J. Sorg (D)	Fernando C. Layton (D)	Dennis D. Donovan (D)	George W. Hulick (R)	George W. Wilson (R)	Luther M. Strong (R)	Byron F. Ritchie (D)	Hezekiah Bundy (R)	Charles H. Grosvenor (R)	Joseph H. Outhwaite (D)	Darius D. Hare (D)	Michael D. Harter (D)	H. Clay Van Voorhis (R)	Albert J. Pearson (D)	James A. D. Richards (D)	George P. Ikirt (D)	Stephen A. Northway (R)	William J. White (R)	Tom L. Johnson (D)
54th (1895–1897)	Charles P. Taft (R)	Jacob H. Bromwell (R)	Paul J. Sorg (D)	Fernando C. Layton (D)	Francis B. De Witt (R)	George W. Hulick (R)	George W. Wilson (R)	Luther M. Strong (R)	James H. Southard (R)	Lucien J. Fenton (R)	Charles H. Grosvenor (R)	David K. Watson (R)	Stephen Ross Harris (R)	Winfield S. Kerr (R)	H. Clay Van Voorhis (R)	Lorenzo Danford (R)	Addison McClure (R)	Robert Walker Tayler (R)	Stephen A. Northway (R)	Clifton B. Beach (R)	Theodore E. Burton (R)
55th (1897–1899)	William B. Shattuc (R)	Jacob H. Bromwell (R)	John Lewis Brenner (D)	George Marshall (D)	David Meekison (D)	Seth W. Brown (R)	Walter L. Weaver (R)	Archibald Lybrand (R)	James H. Southard (R)	Lucien J. Fenton (R)	Charles H. Grosvenor (R)	John J. Lentz (D)	James A. Norton (D)	Winfield S. Kerr (R)	H. Clay Van Voorhis (R)	Lorenzo Danford (R)	John A. McDowell (D)	Robert Walker Tayler (R)	Stephen A. Northway (R)	Clifton B. Beach (R)	Theodore E. Burton (R)
55th (1897–1899)	William B. Shattuc (R)	Jacob H. Bromwell (R)	John Lewis Brenner (D)	George Marshall (D)	David Meekison (D)	Seth W. Brown (R)	Walter L. Weaver (R)	Archibald Lybrand (R)	James H. Southard (R)	Lucien J. Fenton (R)	Charles H. Grosvenor (R)	John J. Lentz (D)	James A. Norton (D)	Winfield S. Kerr (R)	H. Clay Van Voorhis (R)	Lorenzo Danford (R)	John A. McDowell (D)	Robert Walker Tayler (R)	Charles W. F. Dick (R)	Clifton B. Beach (R)	Theodore E. Burton (R)
56th (1899–1901)	William B. Shattuc (R)	Jacob H. Bromwell (R)	John Lewis Brenner (D)	Robert B. Gordon (D)	David Meekison (D)	Seth W. Brown (R)	Walter L. Weaver (R)	Archibald Lybrand (R)	James H. Southard (R)	Stephen Morgan (R)	Charles H. Grosvenor (R)	John J. Lentz (D)	James A. Norton (D)	Winfield S. Kerr (R)	H. Clay Van Voorhis (R)	Lorenzo Danford (R)	John A. McDowell (D)	Robert Walker Tayler (R)	Charles W. F. Dick (R)	Fremont Phillips (R)	Theodore E. Burton (R)
56th (1899–1901)	William B. Shattuc (R)	Jacob H. Bromwell (R)	John Lewis Brenner (D)	Robert B. Gordon (D)	David Meekison (D)	Seth W. Brown (R)	Walter L. Weaver (R)	Archibald Lybrand (R)	James H. Southard (R)	Stephen Morgan (R)	Charles H. Grosvenor (R)	John J. Lentz (D)	James A. Norton (D)	Winfield S. Kerr (R)	H. Clay Van Voorhis (R)	Joseph J. Gill (R)	John A. McDowell (D)	Robert Walker Tayler (R)	Charles W. F. Dick (R)	Fremont Phillips (R)	Theodore E. Burton (R)
57th (1901–1903)	William B. Shattuc (R)	Jacob H. Bromwell (R)	Robert M. Nevin (R)	Robert B. Gordon (D)	John S. Snook (D)	Charles Q. Hildebrant (R)	Thomas B. Kyle (R)	William R. Warnock (R)	James H. Southard (R)	Stephen Morgan (R)	Charles H. Grosvenor (R)	Emmett Tompkins (R)	James A. Norton (D)	William W. Skiles (R)	H. Clay Van Voorhis (R)	Joseph J. Gill (R)	John W. Cassingham (D)	Robert Walker Tayler (R)	Charles W. F. Dick (R)	Jacob A. Beidler (R)	Theodore E. Burton (R)
58th (1903–1905)	Nicholas Longworth (R)	Herman P. Goebel (R)	Robert M. Nevin (R)	Harvey C. Garber (D)	John S. Snook (D)	Charles Q. Hildebrant (R)	Thomas B. Kyle (R)	William R. Warnock (R)	James H. Southard (R)	Stephen Morgan (R)	Charles H. Grosvenor (R)	De Witt C. Badger (D)	Amos H. Jackson (R)	William W. Skiles (R)	H. Clay Van Voorhis (R)	Joseph J. Gill (R)	John W. Cassingham (D)	James Kennedy (R)	Charles W. F. Dick (R)	Jacob A. Beidler (R)	Theodore E. Burton (R)
58th (1903–1905)	Nicholas Longworth (R)	Herman P. Goebel (R)	Robert M. Nevin (R)	Harvey C. Garber (D)	John S. Snook (D)	Charles Q. Hildebrant (R)	Thomas B. Kyle (R)	William R. Warnock (R)	James H. Southard (R)	Stephen Morgan (R)	Charles H. Grosvenor (R)	De Witt C. Badger (D)	Amos H. Jackson (R)	Amos R. Webber (R)	H. Clay Van Voorhis (R)	Capell L. Weems (R)	John W. Cassingham (D)	James Kennedy (R)	W. Aubrey Thomas (R)	Jacob A. Beidler (R)	Theodore E. Burton (R)
59th (1905–1907)	Nicholas Longworth (R)	Herman P. Goebel (R)	Robert M. Nevin (R)	Harvey C. Garber (D)	William Campbell (R)	Thomas Scroggy (R)	J. Warren Keifer (R)	Ralph D. Cole (R)	James H. Southard (R)	Henry T. Bannon (R)	Charles H. Grosvenor (R)	Edward L. Taylor Jr. (R)	Grant E. Mouser (R)	Amos R. Webber (R)	Beman Gates Dawes (R)	Capell L. Weems (R)	Martin L. Smyser (R)	James Kennedy (R)	W. Aubrey Thomas (R)	Jacob A. Beidler (R)	Theodore E. Burton (R)
60th (1907–1909)	Nicholas Longworth (R)	Herman P. Goebel (R)	J. Eugene Harding (R)	William E. Tou Velle (D)	Timothy T. Ansberry (D)	Matthew Denver (D)	J. Warren Keifer (R)	Ralph D. Cole (R)	Isaac R. Sherwood (D)	Henry T. Bannon (R)	Albert Douglas (R)	Edward L. Taylor Jr. (R)	Grant E. Mouser (R)	J. Ford Laning (R)	Beman Gates Dawes (R)	Capell L. Weems (R)	William A. Ashbrook (D)	James Kennedy (R)	W. Aubrey Thomas (R)	L. Paul Howland (R)	Theodore E. Burton (R)
61st (1909–1911)	Nicholas Longworth (R)	Herman P. Goebel (R)	James M. Cox (D)	William E. Tou Velle (D)	Timothy T. Ansberry (D)	Matthew Denver (D)	J. Warren Keifer (R)	Ralph D. Cole (R)	Isaac R. Sherwood (D)	Adna R. Johnson (R)	Albert Douglas (R)	Edward L. Taylor Jr. (R)	Carl C. Anderson (D)	William G. Sharp (D)	James Joyce (R)	David Hollingsworth (R)	William A. Ashbrook (D)	James Kennedy (R)	W. Aubrey Thomas (R)	L. Paul Howland (R)	James H. Cassidy (R)
62nd (1911–1913)	Nicholas Longworth (R)	Alfred G. Allen (D)	James M. Cox (D)	J. Henry Goeke (D)	Timothy T. Ansberry (D)	Matthew Denver (D)	James D. Post (D)	Frank B. Willis (R)	Isaac R. Sherwood (D)	Robert Switzer (R)	Horatio Claypool (D)	Edward L. Taylor Jr. (R)	Carl C. Anderson (D)	William G. Sharp (D)	George White (D)	William Francis (D)	William A. Ashbrook (D)	John J. Whitacre (D)	Ellsworth Bathrick (D)	L. Paul Howland (R)	Robert Bulkley (D)

=== 1913–1933: 22 seats ===
Congress	District																					At-large seat
Congress	1st	2nd	3rd	4th	5th	6th	7th	8th	9th	10th	11th	12th	13th	14th	15th	16th	17th	18th	19th	20th	21st	At-large seat
63rd (1913–1915)	Stanley Bowdle (D)	Alfred G. Allen (D)	Warren Gard (D)	J. Henry Goeke (D)	Timothy T. Ansberry (D)	Simeon D. Fess (R)	James D. Post (D)	Frank B. Willis (R)	Isaac R. Sherwood (D)	Robert M. Switzer (R)	Horatio Claypool (D)	Clement Laird Brumbaugh (D)	John A. Key (D)	William G. Sharp (D)	George White (D)	William Francis (D)	William A. Ashbrook (D)	John J. Whitacre (D)	Ellsworth Bathrick (D)	William Gordon (D)	Robert Bulkley (D)	Robert Crosser (D)
64th (1915–1917)	Nicholas Longworth (R)	Alfred G. Allen (D)	Warren Gard (D)	J. Edward Russell (R)	Nelson E. Matthews (R)	Charles Cyrus Kearns (R)	Simeon D. Fess (R)	John A. Key (D)	Isaac R. Sherwood (D)	Robert M. Switzer (R)	Edwin D. Ricketts (R)	Clement Laird Brumbaugh (D)	Arthur W. Overmyer (D)	Seward Williams (R)	William Mooney (R)	Roscoe C. McCulloch (R)	William A. Ashbrook (D)	David Hollingsworth (R)	John G. Cooper (R)	William Gordon (D)	Robert Crosser (D)	22nd
64th (1915–1917)	Nicholas Longworth (R)	Alfred G. Allen (D)	Warren Gard (D)	J. Edward Russell (R)	Nelson E. Matthews (R)	Charles Cyrus Kearns (R)	Simeon D. Fess (R)	John A. Key (D)	Isaac R. Sherwood (D)	Robert M. Switzer (R)	Edwin D. Ricketts (R)	Clement Laird Brumbaugh (D)	Arthur W. Overmyer (D)	Seward Williams (R)	William Mooney (R)	Roscoe C. McCulloch (R)	William A. Ashbrook (D)	David Hollingsworth (R)	John G. Cooper (R)	William Gordon (D)	Robert Crosser (D)	Henry I. Emerson (R)
65th (1917–1919)	Nicholas Longworth (R)	Victor Heintz (R)	Warren Gard (D)	Benjamin F. Welty (D)	John S. Snook (D)	Charles Cyrus Kearns (R)	Simeon D. Fess (R)	John A. Key (D)	Isaac R. Sherwood (D)	Robert M. Switzer (R)	Horatio Claypool (D)	Clement Laird Brumbaugh (D)	Arthur W. Overmyer (D)	Ellsworth Bathrick (D)	George White (D)	Roscoe C. McCulloch (R)	William A. Ashbrook (D)	David Hollingsworth (R)	John G. Cooper (R)	William Gordon (D)	Robert Crosser (D)	Henry I. Emerson (R)
65th (1917–1919)	Nicholas Longworth (R)	Victor Heintz (R)	Warren Gard (D)	Benjamin F. Welty (D)	John S. Snook (D)	Charles Cyrus Kearns (R)	Simeon D. Fess (R)	John A. Key (D)	Isaac R. Sherwood (D)	Robert M. Switzer (R)	Horatio Claypool (D)	Clement Laird Brumbaugh (D)	Arthur W. Overmyer (D)	Martin L. Davey (D)	George White (D)	Roscoe C. McCulloch (R)	William A. Ashbrook (D)	David Hollingsworth (R)	John G. Cooper (R)	William Gordon (D)	Robert Crosser (D)	Henry I. Emerson (R)
66th (1919–1921)	Nicholas Longworth (R)	Ambrose E. B. Stephens (R)	Warren Gard (D)	Benjamin F. Welty (D)	Charles J. Thompson (R)	Charles Cyrus Kearns (R)	Simeon D. Fess (R)	R. Clint Cole (R)	Isaac R. Sherwood (D)	Israel Moore Foster (R)	Edwin D. Ricketts (R)	Clement Laird Brumbaugh (D)	James T. Begg (R)	Martin L. Davey (D)	C. Ellis Moore (R)	Roscoe C. McCulloch (R)	William A. Ashbrook (D)	B. Frank Murphy (R)	John G. Cooper (R)	Charles Mooney (D)	John J. Babka (D)	Henry I. Emerson (R)
67th (1921–1923)	Nicholas Longworth (R)	Ambrose E. B. Stephens (R)	Roy G. Fitzgerald (R)	John L. Cable (R)	Charles J. Thompson (R)	Charles Cyrus Kearns (R)	Simeon D. Fess (R)	R. Clint Cole (R)	William Chalmers (R)	Israel Moore Foster (R)	Edwin D. Ricketts (R)	John C. Speaks (R)	James T. Begg (R)	C. L. Knight (R)	C. Ellis Moore (R)	Joseph H. Himes (R)	William M. Morgan (R)	B. Frank Murphy (R)	John G. Cooper (R)	Miner G. Norton (R)	Harry Gahn (R)	Theodore E. Burton (R)
68th (1923–1925)	Nicholas Longworth (R)	Ambrose E. B. Stephens (R)	Roy G. Fitzgerald (R)	John L. Cable (R)	Charles J. Thompson (R)	Charles Cyrus Kearns (R)	Charles Brand (R)	R. Clint Cole (R)	Isaac R. Sherwood (D)	Israel Moore Foster (R)	Mell G. Underwood (D)	John C. Speaks (R)	James T. Begg (R)	Martin L. Davey (D)	C. Ellis Moore (R)	John McSweeney (D)	William M. Morgan (R)	B. Frank Murphy (R)	John G. Cooper (R)	Charles Mooney (D)	Robert Crosser (D)	Theodore E. Burton (R)
69th (1925–1927)	Nicholas Longworth (R)	Ambrose E. B. Stephens (R)	Roy G. Fitzgerald (R)	William T. Fitzgerald (R)	Charles J. Thompson (R)	Charles Cyrus Kearns (R)	Charles Brand (R)	Thomas B. Fletcher (D)	William Chalmers (R)	Thomas A. Jenkins (R)	Mell G. Underwood (D)	John C. Speaks (R)	James T. Begg (R)	Martin L. Davey (D)	C. Ellis Moore (R)	John McSweeney (D)	William M. Morgan (R)	B. Frank Murphy (R)	John G. Cooper (R)	Charles Mooney (D)	Robert Crosser (D)	Theodore E. Burton (R)
70th (1927–1929)	Nicholas Longworth (R)	Charles Tatgenhorst (R)	Roy G. Fitzgerald (R)	William T. Fitzgerald (R)	Charles J. Thompson (R)	Charles Cyrus Kearns (R)	Charles Brand (R)	Thomas B. Fletcher (D)	William Chalmers (R)	Thomas A. Jenkins (R)	Mell G. Underwood (D)	John C. Speaks (R)	James T. Begg (R)	Martin L. Davey (D)	C. Ellis Moore (R)	John McSweeney (D)	William M. Morgan (R)	B. Frank Murphy (R)	John G. Cooper (R)	Charles Mooney (D)	Robert Crosser (D)	Theodore E. Burton (R)
71st (1929–1931)	Nicholas Longworth (R)	William E. Hess (R)	Roy G. Fitzgerald (R)	John L. Cable (R)	Charles J. Thompson (R)	Charles Cyrus Kearns (R)	Charles Brand (R)	Grant E. Mouser Jr. (R)	William Chalmers (R)	Thomas A. Jenkins (R)	Mell G. Underwood (D)	John C. Speaks (R)	Joseph E. Baird (R)	Francis Seiberling (R)	C. Ellis Moore (R)	Charles B. McClintock (R)	William M. Morgan (R)	B. Frank Murphy (R)	John G. Cooper (R)	Charles Mooney (D)	Robert Crosser (D)	Chester Bolton (R)
72nd (1931–1933)	Nicholas Longworth (R)	William E. Hess (R)	Byron B. Harlan (D)	John L. Cable (R)	Frank C. Kniffin (D)	James G. Polk (D)	Charles Brand (R)	Grant E. Mouser Jr. (R)	Wilbur M. White (R)	Thomas A. Jenkins (R)	Mell G. Underwood (D)	Arthur P. Lamneck (D)	William L. Fiesinger (D)	Francis Seiberling (R)	C. Ellis Moore (R)	Charles B. McClintock (R)	Charles F. West (D)	B. Frank Murphy (R)	John G. Cooper (R)	Charles Mooney (D)	Robert Crosser (D)	Chester Bolton (R)
72nd (1931–1933)	John B. Hollister (R)	William E. Hess (R)	Byron B. Harlan (D)	John L. Cable (R)	Frank C. Kniffin (D)	James G. Polk (D)	Charles Brand (R)	Grant E. Mouser Jr. (R)	Wilbur M. White (R)	Thomas A. Jenkins (R)	Mell G. Underwood (D)	Arthur P. Lamneck (D)	William L. Fiesinger (D)	Francis Seiberling (R)	C. Ellis Moore (R)	Charles B. McClintock (R)	Charles F. West (D)	B. Frank Murphy (R)	John G. Cooper (R)	Martin Sweeney (D)	Robert Crosser (D)	Chester Bolton (R)

=== 1933–1943: 24 seats ===
Congress	District																						At-large seats	
Congress	1st	2nd	3rd	4th	5th	6th	7th	8th	9th	10th	11th	12th	13th	14th	15th	16th	17th	18th	19th	20th	21st	22nd	At-large seats	
73rd (1933–1935)	John B. Hollister (R)	William E. Hess (R)	Byron B. Harlan (D)	Frank Le Blond Kloeb (D)	Frank C. Kniffin (D)	James G. Polk (D)	Leroy T. Marshall (R)	Thomas B. Fletcher (D)	Warren J. Duffey (D)	Thomas A. Jenkins (R)	Mell G. Underwood (D)	Arthur P. Lamneck (D)	William L. Fiesinger (D)	Dow W. Harter (D)	Robert T. Secrest (D)	William R. Thom (D)	Charles F. West (D)	Lawrence E. Imhoff (D)	John G. Cooper (R)	Martin Sweeney (D)	Robert Crosser (D)	Chester Bolton (R)	Charles V. Truax (D)	Stephen M. Young (D)
74th (1935–1937)	John B. Hollister (R)	William E. Hess (R)	Byron B. Harlan (D)	Frank Le Blond Kloeb (D)	Frank C. Kniffin (D)	James G. Polk (D)	Leroy T. Marshall (R)	Thomas B. Fletcher (D)	Warren J. Duffey (D)	Thomas A. Jenkins (R)	Mell G. Underwood (D)	Arthur P. Lamneck (D)	William L. Fiesinger (D)	Dow W. Harter (D)	Robert T. Secrest (D)	William R. Thom (D)	William A. Ashbrook (D)	Lawrence E. Imhoff (D)	John G. Cooper (R)	Martin Sweeney (D)	Robert Crosser (D)	Chester Bolton (R)	Charles V. Truax (D)	Stephen M. Young (D)
74th (1935–1937)	John B. Hollister (R)	William E. Hess (R)	Byron B. Harlan (D)	Frank Le Blond Kloeb (D)	Frank C. Kniffin (D)	James G. Polk (D)	Leroy T. Marshall (R)	Thomas B. Fletcher (D)	Warren J. Duffey (D)	Thomas A. Jenkins (R)	Peter F. Hammond (D)	Arthur P. Lamneck (D)	William L. Fiesinger (D)	Dow W. Harter (D)	Robert T. Secrest (D)	William R. Thom (D)	William A. Ashbrook (D)	Lawrence E. Imhoff (D)	John G. Cooper (R)	Martin Sweeney (D)	Robert Crosser (D)	Chester Bolton (R)	Daniel S. Earhart (D)	Stephen M. Young (D)
75th (1937–1939)	Joseph A. Dixon (D)	Herbert S. Bigelow (D)	Byron B. Harlan (D)	Frank Le Blond Kloeb (D)	Frank C. Kniffin (D)	James G. Polk (D)	Arthur W. Aleshire (D)	Thomas B. Fletcher (D)	John F. Hunter (D)	Thomas A. Jenkins (R)	Harold K. Claypool (D)	Arthur P. Lamneck (D)	Dudley A. White (R)	Dow W. Harter (D)	Robert T. Secrest (D)	William R. Thom (D)	William A. Ashbrook (D)	Lawrence E. Imhoff (D)	Michael J. Kirwan (D)	Martin Sweeney (D)	Robert Crosser (D)	Anthony A. Fleger (D)	John McSweeney (D)	Harold G. Mosier (D)
75th (1937–1939)	Joseph A. Dixon (D)	Herbert S. Bigelow (D)	Byron B. Harlan (D)	Walter Albaugh (R)	Frank C. Kniffin (D)	James G. Polk (D)	Arthur W. Aleshire (D)	Thomas B. Fletcher (D)	John F. Hunter (D)	Thomas A. Jenkins (R)	Harold K. Claypool (D)	Arthur P. Lamneck (D)	Dudley A. White (R)	Dow W. Harter (D)	Robert T. Secrest (D)	William R. Thom (D)	William A. Ashbrook (D)	Lawrence E. Imhoff (D)	Michael J. Kirwan (D)	Martin Sweeney (D)	Robert Crosser (D)	Anthony A. Fleger (D)	John McSweeney (D)	Harold G. Mosier (D)
76th (1939–1941)	Charles H. Elston (R)	William E. Hess (R)	Harry N. Routzohn (R)	Robert Franklin Jones (R)	Cliff Clevenger (R)	James G. Polk (D)	Clarence J. Brown (R)	Frederick C. Smith (R)	John F. Hunter (D)	Thomas A. Jenkins (R)	Harold K. Claypool (D)	John M. Vorys (R)	Dudley A. White (R)	Dow W. Harter (D)	Robert T. Secrest (D)	James Seccombe (R)	William A. Ashbrook (D)	Earl Ramage Lewis (R)	Michael J. Kirwan (D)	Martin Sweeney (D)	Robert Crosser (D)	Chester Bolton (R)	George Bender (R)	L. L. Marshall (R)
76th (1939–1941)	Charles H. Elston (R)	William E. Hess (R)	Harry N. Routzohn (R)	Robert Franklin Jones (R)	Cliff Clevenger (R)	James G. Polk (D)	Clarence J. Brown (R)	Frederick C. Smith (R)	John F. Hunter (D)	Thomas A. Jenkins (R)	Harold K. Claypool (D)	John M. Vorys (R)	Dudley A. White (R)	Dow W. Harter (D)	Robert T. Secrest (D)	James Seccombe (R)	J. Harry McGregor (R)	Earl Ramage Lewis (R)	Michael J. Kirwan (D)	Martin Sweeney (D)	Robert Crosser (D)	Frances P. Bolton (R)	George Bender (R)	L. L. Marshall (R)
77th (1941–1943)	Charles H. Elston (R)	William E. Hess (R)	Greg J. Holbrock (D)	Robert Franklin Jones (R)	Cliff Clevenger (R)	Jacob E. Davis (D)	Clarence J. Brown (R)	Frederick C. Smith (R)	John F. Hunter (D)	Thomas A. Jenkins (R)	Harold K. Claypool (D)	John M. Vorys (R)	A. David Baumhart Jr. (R)	Dow W. Harter (D)	Robert T. Secrest (D)	William R. Thom (D)	J. Harry McGregor (R)	Lawrence E. Imhoff (D)	Michael J. Kirwan (D)	Martin Sweeney (D)	Robert Crosser (D)	Frances P. Bolton (R)	George Bender (R)	Stephen M. Young (D)

=== 1943–1963: 23 seats ===
Congress	District																						
Congress	1st	2nd	3rd	4th	5th	6th	7th	8th	9th	10th	11th	12th	13th	14th	15th	16th	17th	18th	19th	20th	21st	22nd	At-large
78th (1943–1945)	Charles H. Elston (R)	William E. Hess (R)	Harry P. Jeffrey (R)	Robert Franklin Jones (R)	Cliff Clevenger (R)	Edward Oscar McCowen (R)	Clarence J. Brown (R)	Frederick C. Smith (R)	Homer A. Ramey (R)	Thomas A. Jenkins (R)	Walter E. Brehm (R)	John M. Vorys (R)	Alvin F. Weichel (R)	Edmund Rowe (R)	Red Griffiths (R)	Henderson H. Carson (R)	J. Harry McGregor (R)	Earl Ramage Lewis (R)	Michael J. Kirwan (D)	Michael A. Feighan (D)	Robert Crosser (D)	Frances P. Bolton (R)	George Bender (R)
79th (1945–1947)	Charles H. Elston (R)	William E. Hess (R)	Edward J. Gardner (D)	Robert Franklin Jones (R)	Cliff Clevenger (R)	Edward Oscar McCowen (R)	Clarence J. Brown (R)	Frederick C. Smith (R)	Homer A. Ramey (R)	Thomas A. Jenkins (R)	Walter E. Brehm (R)	John M. Vorys (R)	Alvin F. Weichel (R)	Walter B. Huber (D)	Red Griffiths (R)	William R. Thom (D)	J. Harry McGregor (R)	Earl Ramage Lewis (R)	Michael J. Kirwan (D)	Michael A. Feighan (D)	Robert Crosser (D)	Frances P. Bolton (R)	George Bender (R)
80th (1947–1949)	Charles H. Elston (R)	William E. Hess (R)	Raymond H. Burke (R)	Robert Franklin Jones (R)	Cliff Clevenger (R)	Edward Oscar McCowen (R)	Clarence J. Brown (R)	Frederick C. Smith (R)	Homer A. Ramey (R)	Thomas A. Jenkins (R)	Walter E. Brehm (R)	John M. Vorys (R)	Alvin F. Weichel (R)	Walter B. Huber (D)	Red Griffiths (R)	Henderson H. Carson (R)	J. Harry McGregor (R)	Earl Ramage Lewis (R)	Michael J. Kirwan (D)	Michael A. Feighan (D)	Robert Crosser (D)	Frances P. Bolton (R)	George Bender (R)
80th (1947–1949)	Charles H. Elston (R)	William E. Hess (R)	Raymond H. Burke (R)	William Moore McCulloch (R)	Cliff Clevenger (R)	Edward Oscar McCowen (R)	Clarence J. Brown (R)	Frederick C. Smith (R)	Homer A. Ramey (R)	Thomas A. Jenkins (R)	Walter E. Brehm (R)	John M. Vorys (R)	Alvin F. Weichel (R)	Walter B. Huber (D)	Red Griffiths (R)	Henderson H. Carson (R)	J. Harry McGregor (R)	Earl Ramage Lewis (R)	Michael J. Kirwan (D)	Michael A. Feighan (D)	Robert Crosser (D)	Frances P. Bolton (R)	George Bender (R)
81st (1949–1951)	Charles H. Elston (R)	Earl T. Wagner (D)	Edward G. Breen (D)	William Moore McCulloch (R)	Cliff Clevenger (R)	James G. Polk (D)	Clarence J. Brown (R)	Frederick C. Smith (R)	Thomas Burke (D)	Thomas A. Jenkins (R)	Walter E. Brehm (R)	John M. Vorys (R)	Alvin F. Weichel (R)	Walter B. Huber (D)	Robert T. Secrest (D)	John McSweeney (D)	J. Harry McGregor (R)	Wayne Hays (D)	Michael J. Kirwan (D)	Michael A. Feighan (D)	Robert Crosser (D)	Frances P. Bolton (R)	Stephen Young (D)
82nd (1951–1953)	Charles H. Elston (R)	William E. Hess (R)	Edward G. Breen (D)	William Moore McCulloch (R)	Cliff Clevenger (R)	James G. Polk (D)	Clarence J. Brown (R)	Jackson Edward Betts (R)	Frazier Reams (I)	Thomas A. Jenkins (R)	Walter E. Brehm (R)	John M. Vorys (R)	Alvin F. Weichel (R)	William Hanes Ayres (R)	Robert T. Secrest (D)	Frank T. Bow (R)	J. Harry McGregor (R)	Wayne Hays (D)	Michael J. Kirwan (D)	Michael A. Feighan (D)	Robert Crosser (D)	Frances P. Bolton (R)	George Bender (R)
82nd (1951–1953)	Charles H. Elston (R)	William E. Hess (R)	Paul F. Schenck (R)	William Moore McCulloch (R)	Cliff Clevenger (R)	James G. Polk (D)	Clarence J. Brown (R)	Jackson Edward Betts (R)	Frazier Reams (I)	Thomas A. Jenkins (R)	Walter E. Brehm (R)	John M. Vorys (R)	Alvin F. Weichel (R)	William Hanes Ayres (R)	Robert T. Secrest (D)	Frank T. Bow (R)	J. Harry McGregor (R)	Wayne Hays (D)	Michael J. Kirwan (D)	Michael A. Feighan (D)	Robert Crosser (D)	Frances P. Bolton (R)	George Bender (R)
83rd (1953–1955)	Gordon H. Scherer (R)	William E. Hess (R)	Paul F. Schenck (R)	William Moore McCulloch (R)	Cliff Clevenger (R)	James G. Polk (D)	Clarence J. Brown (R)	Jackson Edward Betts (R)	Frazier Reams (I)	Thomas A. Jenkins (R)	Oliver P. Bolton (R)	John M. Vorys (R)	Alvin F. Weichel (R)	William Hanes Ayres (R)	Robert T. Secrest (D)	Frank T. Bow (R)	J. Harry McGregor (R)	Wayne Hays (D)	Michael J. Kirwan (D)	Michael A. Feighan (D)	Robert Crosser (D)	Frances P. Bolton (R)	23rd
83rd (1953–1955)	Gordon H. Scherer (R)	William E. Hess (R)	Paul F. Schenck (R)	William Moore McCulloch (R)	Cliff Clevenger (R)	James G. Polk (D)	Clarence J. Brown (R)	Jackson Edward Betts (R)	Frazier Reams (I)	Thomas A. Jenkins (R)	Oliver P. Bolton (R)	John M. Vorys (R)	Alvin F. Weichel (R)	William Hanes Ayres (R)	Robert T. Secrest (D)	Frank T. Bow (R)	J. Harry McGregor (R)	Wayne Hays (D)	Michael J. Kirwan (D)	Michael A. Feighan (D)	Robert Crosser (D)	Frances P. Bolton (R)	George Bender (R)
84th (1955–1957)	Gordon H. Scherer (R)	William E. Hess (R)	Paul F. Schenck (R)	William Moore McCulloch (R)	Cliff Clevenger (R)	James G. Polk (D)	Clarence J. Brown (R)	Jackson Edward Betts (R)	Lud Ashley (D)	Thomas A. Jenkins (R)	Oliver P. Bolton (R)	John M. Vorys (R)	A. David Baumhart Jr. (R)	William Hanes Ayres (R)	John E. Henderson (R)	Frank T. Bow (R)	J. Harry McGregor (R)	Wayne Hays (D)	Michael J. Kirwan (D)	Michael A. Feighan (D)	Charles Vanik (D)	Frances P. Bolton (R)	William Minshall Jr. (R)
85th (1957–1959)	Gordon H. Scherer (R)	William E. Hess (R)	Paul F. Schenck (R)	William Moore McCulloch (R)	Cliff Clevenger (R)	James G. Polk (D)	Clarence J. Brown (R)	Jackson Edward Betts (R)	Lud Ashley (D)	Thomas A. Jenkins (R)	David S. Dennison Jr. (R)	John M. Vorys (R)	A. David Baumhart Jr. (R)	William Hanes Ayres (R)	John E. Henderson (R)	Frank T. Bow (R)	J. Harry McGregor (R)	Wayne Hays (D)	Michael J. Kirwan (D)	Michael A. Feighan (D)	Charles Vanik (D)	Frances P. Bolton (R)	William Minshall Jr. (R)
86th (1959–1961)	Gordon H. Scherer (R)	William E. Hess (R)	Paul F. Schenck (R)	William Moore McCulloch (R)	Del Latta (R)	James G. Polk (D)	Clarence J. Brown (R)	Jackson Edward Betts (R)	Lud Ashley (D)	Walter H. Moeller (D)	Robert E. Cook (D)	Samuel L. Devine (R)	A. David Baumhart Jr. (R)	William Hanes Ayres (R)	John E. Henderson (R)	Frank T. Bow (R)	Robert W. Levering (D)	Wayne Hays (D)	Michael J. Kirwan (D)	Michael A. Feighan (D)	Charles Vanik (D)	Frances P. Bolton (R)	William Minshall Jr. (R)
86th (1959–1961)	Gordon H. Scherer (R)	William E. Hess (R)	Paul F. Schenck (R)	William Moore McCulloch (R)	Del Latta (R)	Ward Miller (R)	Clarence J. Brown (R)	Jackson Edward Betts (R)	Lud Ashley (D)	Walter H. Moeller (D)	Robert E. Cook (D)	Samuel L. Devine (R)	A. David Baumhart Jr. (R)	William Hanes Ayres (R)	John E. Henderson (R)	Frank T. Bow (R)	Robert W. Levering (D)	Wayne Hays (D)	Michael J. Kirwan (D)	Michael A. Feighan (D)	Charles Vanik (D)	Frances P. Bolton (R)	William Minshall Jr. (R)
87th (1961–1963)	Gordon H. Scherer (R)	Donald Clancy (R)	Paul F. Schenck (R)	William Moore McCulloch (R)	Del Latta (R)	Bill Harsha (R)	Clarence J. Brown (R)	Jackson Edward Betts (R)	Lud Ashley (D)	Walter H. Moeller (D)	Robert E. Cook (D)	Samuel L. Devine (R)	Charles Mosher (R)	William Hanes Ayres (R)	Tom Moorehead (R)	Frank T. Bow (R)	John M. Ashbrook (R)	Wayne Hays (D)	Michael J. Kirwan (D)	Michael A. Feighan (D)	Charles Vanik (D)	Frances P. Bolton (R)	William Minshall Jr. (R)

=== 1963–1973: 24 seats ===
Congress	District																							
Congress	1st	2nd	3rd	4th	5th	6th	7th	8th	9th	10th	11th	12th	13th	14th	15th	16th	17th	18th	19th	20th	21st	22nd	23rd	At-large
88th (1963–1965)	Carl West Rich (R)	Donald Clancy (R)	Paul F. Schenck (R)	William Moore McCulloch (R)	Del Latta (R)	Bill Harsha (R)	Clarence J. Brown (R)	Jackson Edward Betts (R)	Lud Ashley (D)	Pete Abele (R)	Oliver P. Bolton (R)	Samuel L. Devine (R)	Charles Mosher (R)	William Hanes Ayres (R)	Robert T. Secrest (D)	Frank T. Bow (R)	John M. Ashbrook (R)	Wayne Hays (D)	Michael J. Kirwan (D)	Michael A. Feighan (D)	Charles Vanik (D)	Frances P. Bolton (R)	William Minshall Jr. (R)	Robert Taft Jr. (R)
89th (1965–1967)	John J. Gilligan (D)	Donald Clancy (R)	Rodney M. Love (D)	William Moore McCulloch (R)	Del Latta (R)	Bill Harsha (R)	Clarence J. Brown (R)	Jackson Edward Betts (R)	Lud Ashley (D)	Walter H. Moeller (D)	J. William Stanton (R)	Samuel L. Devine (R)	Charles Mosher (R)	William Hanes Ayres (R)	Robert T. Secrest (D)	Frank T. Bow (R)	John M. Ashbrook (R)	Wayne Hays (D)	Michael J. Kirwan (D)	Michael A. Feighan (D)	Charles Vanik (D)	Frances P. Bolton (R)	William Minshall Jr. (R)	Robert E. Sweeney (D)
89th (1965–1967)	John J. Gilligan (D)	Donald Clancy (R)	Rodney M. Love (D)	William Moore McCulloch (R)	Del Latta (R)	Bill Harsha (R)	Bud Brown (R)	Jackson Edward Betts (R)	Lud Ashley (D)	Walter H. Moeller (D)	J. William Stanton (R)	Samuel L. Devine (R)	Charles Mosher (R)	William Hanes Ayres (R)	Robert T. Secrest (D)	Frank T. Bow (R)	John M. Ashbrook (R)	Wayne Hays (D)	Michael J. Kirwan (D)	Michael A. Feighan (D)	Charles Vanik (D)	Frances P. Bolton (R)	William Minshall Jr. (R)	Robert E. Sweeney (D)
90th (1967–1969)	Robert Taft Jr. (R)	Donald Clancy (R)	Chuck Whalen Jr. (R)	William Moore McCulloch (R)	Del Latta (R)	Bill Harsha (R)	Bud Brown (R)	Jackson Edward Betts (R)	Lud Ashley (D)	Clarence E. Miller (R)	J. William Stanton (R)	Samuel L. Devine (R)	Charles Mosher (R)	William Hanes Ayres (R)	Chalmers Wylie (R)	Frank T. Bow (R)	John M. Ashbrook (R)	Wayne Hays (D)	Michael J. Kirwan (D)	Michael A. Feighan (D)	Charles Vanik (D)	Frances P. Bolton (R)	William Minshall Jr. (R)	24th
90th (1967–1969)	Robert Taft Jr. (R)	Donald Clancy (R)	Chuck Whalen Jr. (R)	William Moore McCulloch (R)	Del Latta (R)	Bill Harsha (R)	Bud Brown (R)	Jackson Edward Betts (R)	Lud Ashley (D)	Clarence E. Miller (R)	J. William Stanton (R)	Samuel L. Devine (R)	Charles Mosher (R)	William Hanes Ayres (R)	Chalmers Wylie (R)	Frank T. Bow (R)	John M. Ashbrook (R)	Wayne Hays (D)	Michael J. Kirwan (D)	Michael A. Feighan (D)	Charles Vanik (D)	Frances P. Bolton (R)	William Minshall Jr. (R)	Buz Lukens (R)
91st (1969–1971)	Robert Taft Jr. (R)	Donald Clancy (R)	Chuck Whalen Jr. (R)	William Moore McCulloch (R)	Del Latta (R)	Bill Harsha (R)	Bud Brown (R)	Jackson Edward Betts (R)	Lud Ashley (D)	Clarence E. Miller (R)	J. William Stanton (R)	Samuel L. Devine (R)	Charles Mosher (R)	William Hanes Ayres (R)	Chalmers Wylie (R)	Frank T. Bow (R)	John M. Ashbrook (R)	Wayne Hays (D)	Michael J. Kirwan (D)	Michael A. Feighan (D)	Louis Stokes (D)	Charles Vanik (D)	William Minshall Jr. (R)	Buz Lukens (R)
91st (1969–1971)	Robert Taft Jr. (R)	Donald Clancy (R)	Chuck Whalen Jr. (R)	William Moore McCulloch (R)	Del Latta (R)	Bill Harsha (R)	Bud Brown (R)	Jackson Edward Betts (R)	Lud Ashley (D)	Clarence E. Miller (R)	J. William Stanton (R)	Samuel L. Devine (R)	Charles Mosher (R)	William Hanes Ayres (R)	Chalmers Wylie (R)	Frank T. Bow (R)	John M. Ashbrook (R)	Wayne Hays (D)	Charles J. Carney (D)	Michael A. Feighan (D)	Louis Stokes (D)	Charles Vanik (D)	William Minshall Jr. (R)	Buz Lukens (R)
92nd (1971–1973)	Bill Keating (R)	Donald Clancy (R)	Chuck Whalen Jr. (R)	William Moore McCulloch (R)	Del Latta (R)	Bill Harsha (R)	Bud Brown (R)	Jackson Edward Betts (R)	Lud Ashley (D)	Clarence E. Miller (R)	J. William Stanton (R)	Samuel L. Devine (R)	Charles Mosher (R)	John F. Seiberling (D)	Chalmers Wylie (R)	Frank T. Bow (R)	John M. Ashbrook (R)	Wayne Hays (D)	Charles J. Carney (D)	James V. Stanton (D)	Louis Stokes (D)	Charles Vanik (D)	William Minshall Jr. (R)	Walter E. Powell (R)

=== 1973–1983: 23 seats ===
Congress	District																						
Congress	1st	2nd	3rd	4th	5th	6th	7th	8th	9th	10th	11th	12th	13th	14th	15th	16th	17th	18th	19th	20th	21st	22nd	23rd
93rd (1973–1975)	Bill; Keating (R)	Donald; Clancy (R)	Chuck; Whalen; Jr. (R)	Tennyson; Guyer (R)	Del; Latta (R)	Bill; Harsha (R)	Bud; Brown (R)	Walter; Powell (R)	Lud; Ashley (D)	Clarence; E. Miller (R)	J. William; Stanton (R)	Samuel; L. Devine (R)	Charles; Mosher (R)	John F. Seiberling (D)	Chalmers; Wylie (R)	Ralph; Regula (R)	John M. Ashbrook (R)	Wayne; Hays (D)	Charles; J. Carney (D)	James; V. Stanton (D)	Louis; Stokes (D)	Charles; Vanik (D)	William; Minshall; Jr. (R)
93rd (1973–1975)	Tom; Luken (D)	Donald; Clancy (R)	Chuck; Whalen; Jr. (R)	Tennyson; Guyer (R)	Del; Latta (R)	Bill; Harsha (R)	Bud; Brown (R)	Walter; Powell (R)	Lud; Ashley (D)	Clarence; E. Miller (R)	J. William; Stanton (R)	Samuel; L. Devine (R)	Charles; Mosher (R)	John F. Seiberling (D)	Chalmers; Wylie (R)	Ralph; Regula (R)	John M. Ashbrook (R)	Wayne; Hays (D)	Charles; J. Carney (D)	James; V. Stanton (D)	Louis; Stokes (D)	Charles; Vanik (D)	William; Minshall; Jr. (R)
94th (1975–1977)	Bill; Gradison (R)	Donald; Clancy (R)	Chuck; Whalen; Jr. (R)	Tennyson; Guyer (R)	Del; Latta (R)	Bill; Harsha (R)	Bud; Brown (R)	Tom; Kindness (R)	Lud; Ashley (D)	Clarence; E. Miller (R)	J. William; Stanton (R)	Samuel; L. Devine (R)	Charles; Mosher (R)	John F. Seiberling (D)	Chalmers; Wylie (R)	Ralph; Regula (R)	John M. Ashbrook (R)	Wayne; Hays (D)	Charles; J. Carney (D)	James; V. Stanton (D)	Louis; Stokes (D)	Charles; Vanik (D)	Ronald; M. Mottl (D)
95th (1977–1979)	Bill; Gradison (R)	Tom; Luken (D)	Chuck; Whalen; Jr. (R)	Tennyson; Guyer (R)	Del; Latta (R)	Bill; Harsha (R)	Bud; Brown (R)	Tom; Kindness (R)	Lud; Ashley (D)	Clarence; E. Miller (R)	J. William; Stanton (R)	Samuel; L. Devine (R)	Don; Pease (D)	John F. Seiberling (D)	Chalmers; Wylie (R)	Ralph; Regula (R)	John M. Ashbrook (R)	Doug; Applegate (D)	Charles; J. Carney (D)	Mary; Rose; Oakar (D)	Louis; Stokes (D)	Charles; Vanik (D)	Ronald; M. Mottl (D)
96th (1979–1981)	Bill; Gradison (R)	Tom; Luken (D)	Tony; P. Hall (D)	Tennyson; Guyer (R)	Del; Latta (R)	Bill; Harsha (R)	Bud; Brown (R)	Tom; Kindness (R)	Lud; Ashley (D)	Clarence; E. Miller (R)	J. William; Stanton (R)	Samuel; L. Devine (R)	Don; Pease (D)	John F. Seiberling (D)	Chalmers; Wylie (R)	Ralph; Regula (R)	John M. Ashbrook (R)	Doug; Applegate (D)	Lyle; Williams (R)	Mary; Rose; Oakar (D)	Louis; Stokes (D)	Charles; Vanik (D)	Ronald; M. Mottl (D)
97th (1981–1983)	Bill; Gradison (R)	Tom; Luken (D)	Tony; P. Hall (D)	Tennyson; Guyer (R)	Del; Latta (R)	Bob; McEwen (R)	Bud; Brown (R)	Tom; Kindness (R)	Ed; Weber (R)	Clarence; E. Miller (R)	J. William; Stanton (R)	Bob; Shamansky (D)	Don; Pease (D)	John F. Seiberling (D)	Chalmers; Wylie (R)	Ralph; Regula (R)	John M. Ashbrook (R)	Doug; Applegate (D)	Lyle; Williams (R)	Mary; Rose; Oakar (D)	Louis; Stokes (D)	Dennis E. Eckart (D)	Ronald; M. Mottl (D)
97th (1981–1983)	Bill; Gradison (R)	Tom; Luken (D)	Tony; P. Hall (D)	Mike; Oxley (R)	Del; Latta (R)	Bob; McEwen (R)	Bud; Brown (R)	Tom; Kindness (R)	Ed; Weber (R)	Clarence; E. Miller (R)	J. William; Stanton (R)	Bob; Shamansky (D)	Don; Pease (D)	John F. Seiberling (D)	Chalmers; Wylie (R)	Ralph; Regula (R)	Jean S. Ashbrook (R)	Doug; Applegate (D)	Lyle; Williams (R)	Mary; Rose; Oakar (D)	Louis; Stokes (D)	Dennis E. Eckart (D)	Ronald; M. Mottl (D)

=== 1983–1993: 21 seats ===
Congress	District																				
Congress	1st	2nd	3rd	4th	5th	6th	7th	8th	9th	10th	11th	12th	13th	14th	15th	16th	17th	18th	19th	20th	21st
98th (1983–1985)	Tom; Luken (D)	Bill; Gradison (R)	Tony P. Hall (D)	Mike; Oxley (R)	Del; Latta (R)	Bob; McEwen (R)	Mike; DeWine (R)	Tom; Kindness (R)	Marcy; Kaptur (D)	Clarence; E. Miller (R)	Dennis; E. Eckart (D)	John; Kasich (R)	Don; Pease (D)	John F. Sieberling (D)	Chalmers; Wylie (R)	Ralph; Regula (R)	Lyle; Williams (R)	Doug; Applegate (D)	Ed; Feighan (D)	Mary; Rose; Oakar (D)	Louis; Stokes (D)
99th (1985–1987)	Tom; Luken (D)	Bill; Gradison (R)	Tony P. Hall (D)	Mike; Oxley (R)	Del; Latta (R)	Bob; McEwen (R)	Mike; DeWine (R)	Tom; Kindness (R)	Marcy; Kaptur (D)	Clarence; E. Miller (R)	Dennis; E. Eckart (D)	John; Kasich (R)	Don; Pease (D)	John F. Sieberling (D)	Chalmers; Wylie (R)	Ralph; Regula (R)	Jim; Traficant (D)	Doug; Applegate (D)	Ed; Feighan (D)	Mary; Rose; Oakar (D)	Louis; Stokes (D)
100th (1987–1989)	Tom; Luken (D)	Bill; Gradison (R)	Tony P. Hall (D)	Mike; Oxley (R)	Del; Latta (R)	Bob; McEwen (R)	Mike; DeWine (R)	Buz; Lukens (R)	Marcy; Kaptur (D)	Clarence; E. Miller (R)	Dennis; E. Eckart (D)	John; Kasich (R)	Don; Pease (D)	Tom; Sawyer (D)	Chalmers; Wylie (R)	Ralph; Regula (R)	Jim; Traficant (D)	Doug; Applegate (D)	Ed; Feighan (D)	Mary; Rose; Oakar (D)	Louis; Stokes (D)
101st (1989–1991)	Tom; Luken (D)	Bill; Gradison (R)	Tony P. Hall (D)	Mike; Oxley (R)	Paul; Gillmor (R)	Bob; McEwen (R)	Mike; DeWine (R)	Buz; Lukens (R)	Marcy; Kaptur (D)	Clarence; E. Miller (R)	Dennis; E. Eckart (D)	John; Kasich (R)	Don; Pease (D)	Tom; Sawyer (D)	Chalmers; Wylie (R)	Ralph; Regula (R)	Jim; Traficant (D)	Doug; Applegate (D)	Ed; Feighan (D)	Mary; Rose; Oakar (D)	Louis; Stokes (D)
102nd (1991–1993)	Charlie; Luken (D)	Bill; Gradison (R)	Tony P. Hall (D)	Mike; Oxley (R)	Paul; Gillmor (R)	Bob; McEwen (R)	Dave; Hobson (R)	John; Boehner (R)	Marcy; Kaptur (D)	Clarence; E. Miller (R)	Dennis; E. Eckart (D)	John; Kasich (R)	Don; Pease (D)	Tom; Sawyer (D)	Chalmers; Wylie (R)	Ralph; Regula (R)	Jim; Traficant (D)	Doug; Applegate (D)	Ed; Feighan (D)	Mary; Rose; Oakar (D)	Louis; Stokes (D)

=== 1993–2003: 19 seats ===
Congress	District																		
Congress	1st	2nd	3rd	4th	5th	6th	7th	8th	9th	10th	11th	12th	13th	14th	15th	16th	17th	18th	19th
103rd (1993–1995)	David S. Mann (D)	Bill Gradison (R)	Tony P. Hall (D)	Mike; Oxley (R)	Paul; Gillmor (R)	Ted; Strickland (D)	Dave; Hobson (R)	John; Boehner (R)	Marcy; Kaptur (D)	Martin; Hoke (R)	Louis; Stokes (D)	John; Kasich (R)	Sherrod; Brown (D)	Tom; Sawyer (D)	Deborah; Pryce (R)	Ralph; Regula (R)	Jim; Traficant (D)	Doug; Applegate (D)	Eric; Fingerhut (D)
103rd (1993–1995)	David S. Mann (D)	Rob; Portman (R)	Tony P. Hall (D)	Mike; Oxley (R)	Paul; Gillmor (R)	Ted; Strickland (D)	Dave; Hobson (R)	John; Boehner (R)	Marcy; Kaptur (D)	Martin; Hoke (R)	Louis; Stokes (D)	John; Kasich (R)	Sherrod; Brown (D)	Tom; Sawyer (D)	Deborah; Pryce (R)	Ralph; Regula (R)	Jim; Traficant (D)	Doug; Applegate (D)	Eric; Fingerhut (D)
104th (1995–1997)	Steve; Chabot (R)	Rob; Portman (R)	Tony P. Hall (D)	Mike; Oxley (R)	Paul; Gillmor (R)	Frank; Cremeans (R)	Dave; Hobson (R)	John; Boehner (R)	Marcy; Kaptur (D)	Martin; Hoke (R)	Louis; Stokes (D)	John; Kasich (R)	Sherrod; Brown (D)	Tom; Sawyer (D)	Deborah; Pryce (R)	Ralph; Regula (R)	Jim; Traficant (D)	Bob; Ney (R)	Steve; LaTourette (R)
105th (1997–1999)	Steve; Chabot (R)	Rob; Portman (R)	Tony P. Hall (D)	Mike; Oxley (R)	Paul; Gillmor (R)	Ted; Strickland (D)	Dave; Hobson (R)	John; Boehner (R)	Marcy; Kaptur (D)	Dennis; Kucinich (D)	Louis; Stokes (D)	John; Kasich (R)	Sherrod; Brown (D)	Tom; Sawyer (D)	Deborah; Pryce (R)	Ralph; Regula (R)	Jim; Traficant (D)	Bob; Ney (R)	Steve; LaTourette (R)
106th (1999–2001)	Steve; Chabot (R)	Rob; Portman (R)	Tony P. Hall (D)	Mike; Oxley (R)	Paul; Gillmor (R)	Ted; Strickland (D)	Dave; Hobson (R)	John; Boehner (R)	Marcy; Kaptur (D)	Dennis; Kucinich (D)	Stephanie; Tubbs; Jones (D)	John; Kasich (R)	Sherrod; Brown (D)	Tom; Sawyer (D)	Deborah; Pryce (R)	Ralph; Regula (R)	Jim; Traficant (D)	Bob; Ney (R)	Steve; LaTourette (R)
107th (2001–2003)	Steve; Chabot (R)	Rob; Portman (R)	Tony P. Hall (D)	Mike; Oxley (R)	Paul; Gillmor (R)	Ted; Strickland (D)	Dave; Hobson (R)	John; Boehner (R)	Marcy; Kaptur (D)	Dennis; Kucinich (D)	Stephanie; Tubbs; Jones (D)	Pat Tiberi (R)	Sherrod; Brown (D)	Tom; Sawyer (D)	Deborah; Pryce (R)	Ralph; Regula (R)	Jim; Traficant (D)	Bob; Ney (R)	Steve; LaTourette (R)

=== 2003–2013: 18 seats ===
Congress	District																	
Congress	1st	2nd	3rd	4th	5th	6th	7th	8th	9th	10th	11th	12th	13th	14th	15th	16th	17th	18th
108th (2003–2005)	Steve; Chabot (R)	Rob; Portman (R)	Mike; Turner (R)	Mike; Oxley (R)	Paul; Gillmor (R)	Ted; Strickland (D)	Dave; Hobson (R)	John; Boehner (R)	Marcy; Kaptur (D)	Dennis; Kucinich (D)	Stephanie; Tubbs; Jones (D)	Pat; Tiberi (R)	Sherrod; Brown (D)	Steve; LaTourette (R)	Deborah; Pryce (R)	Ralph; Regula (R)	Tim; Ryan (D)	Bob; Ney (R)
109th (2005–2007)	Steve; Chabot (R)	Rob; Portman (R)	Mike; Turner (R)	Mike; Oxley (R)	Paul; Gillmor (R)	Ted; Strickland (D)	Dave; Hobson (R)	John; Boehner (R)	Marcy; Kaptur (D)	Dennis; Kucinich (D)	Stephanie; Tubbs; Jones (D)	Pat; Tiberi (R)	Sherrod; Brown (D)	Steve; LaTourette (R)	Deborah; Pryce (R)	Ralph; Regula (R)	Tim; Ryan (D)	Bob; Ney (R)
109th (2005–2007)	Steve; Chabot (R)	Jean; Schmidt (R)	Mike; Turner (R)	Mike; Oxley (R)	Paul; Gillmor (R)	Ted; Strickland (D)	Dave; Hobson (R)	John; Boehner (R)	Marcy; Kaptur (D)	Dennis; Kucinich (D)	Stephanie; Tubbs; Jones (D)	Pat; Tiberi (R)	Sherrod; Brown (D)	Steve; LaTourette (R)	Deborah; Pryce (R)	Ralph; Regula (R)	Tim; Ryan (D)	Bob; Ney (R)
110th (2007–2009)	Steve; Chabot (R)	Jean; Schmidt (R)	Mike; Turner (R)	Jim; Jordan (R)	Paul; Gillmor (R)	Charlie; Wilson (D)	Dave; Hobson (R)	John; Boehner (R)	Marcy; Kaptur (D)	Dennis; Kucinich (D)	Stephanie; Tubbs; Jones (D)	Pat; Tiberi (R)	Betty; Sutton (D)	Steve; LaTourette (R)	Deborah; Pryce (R)	Ralph; Regula (R)	Tim; Ryan (D)	Zack; Space (D)
110th (2007–2009)	Steve; Chabot (R)	Jean; Schmidt (R)	Mike; Turner (R)	Jim; Jordan (R)	Bob; Latta (R)	Charlie; Wilson (D)	Dave; Hobson (R)	John; Boehner (R)	Marcy; Kaptur (D)	Dennis; Kucinich (D)	Marcia; Fudge (D)	Pat; Tiberi (R)	Betty; Sutton (D)	Steve; LaTourette (R)	Deborah; Pryce (R)	Ralph; Regula (R)	Tim; Ryan (D)	Zack; Space (D)
111th (2009–2011)	Steve; Driehaus (D)	Jean; Schmidt (R)	Mike; Turner (R)	Jim; Jordan (R)	Bob; Latta (R)	Charlie; Wilson (D)	Steve; Austria (R)	John; Boehner (R)	Marcy; Kaptur (D)	Dennis; Kucinich (D)	Marcia; Fudge (D)	Pat; Tiberi (R)	Betty; Sutton (D)	Steve; LaTourette (R)	Mary Jo; Kilroy (D)	John; Boccieri (D)	Tim; Ryan (D)	Zack; Space (D)
112th (2011–2013)	Steve; Chabot (R)	Jean; Schmidt (R)	Mike; Turner (R)	Jim; Jordan (R)	Bob; Latta (R)	Bill; Johnson (R)	Steve; Austria (R)	John; Boehner (R)	Marcy; Kaptur (D)	Dennis; Kucinich (D)	Marcia; Fudge (D)	Pat; Tiberi (R)	Betty; Sutton (D)	Steve; LaTourette (R)	Steve; Stivers (R)	Jim; Renacci (R)	Tim; Ryan (D)	Bob; Gibbs (R)

=== 2013–2023: 16 seats ===
Congress	District															
Congress	1st	2nd	3rd	4th	5th	6th	7th	8th	9th	10th	11th	12th	13th	14th	15th	16th
113th (2013–2015)	Steve; Chabot (R)	Brad; Wenstrup (R)	Joyce; Beatty (D)	Jim; Jordan (R)	Bob; Latta (R)	Bill; Johnson (R)	Bob; Gibbs (R)	John; Boehner (R)	Marcy; Kaptur (D)	Mike; Turner (R)	Marcia; Fudge (D)	Pat; Tiberi (R)	Tim; Ryan (D)	David; Joyce (R)	Steve; Stivers (R)	Jim; Renacci (R)
114th (2015–2017)	Steve; Chabot (R)	Brad; Wenstrup (R)	Joyce; Beatty (D)	Jim; Jordan (R)	Bob; Latta (R)	Bill; Johnson (R)	Bob; Gibbs (R)	John; Boehner (R)	Marcy; Kaptur (D)	Mike; Turner (R)	Marcia; Fudge (D)	Pat; Tiberi (R)	Tim; Ryan (D)	David; Joyce (R)	Steve; Stivers (R)	Jim; Renacci (R)
114th (2015–2017)	Steve; Chabot (R)	Brad; Wenstrup (R)	Joyce; Beatty (D)	Jim; Jordan (R)	Bob; Latta (R)	Bill; Johnson (R)	Bob; Gibbs (R)	Warren; Davidson (R)	Marcy; Kaptur (D)	Mike; Turner (R)	Marcia; Fudge (D)	Pat; Tiberi (R)	Tim; Ryan (D)	David; Joyce (R)	Steve; Stivers (R)	Jim; Renacci (R)
115th (2017–2019)	Steve; Chabot (R)	Brad; Wenstrup (R)	Joyce; Beatty (D)	Jim; Jordan (R)	Bob; Latta (R)	Bill; Johnson (R)	Bob; Gibbs (R)	Warren; Davidson (R)	Marcy; Kaptur (D)	Mike; Turner (R)	Marcia; Fudge (D)	Pat; Tiberi (R)	Tim; Ryan (D)	David; Joyce (R)	Steve; Stivers (R)	Jim; Renacci (R)
115th (2017–2019)	Steve; Chabot (R)	Brad; Wenstrup (R)	Joyce; Beatty (D)	Jim; Jordan (R)	Bob; Latta (R)	Bill; Johnson (R)	Bob; Gibbs (R)	Warren; Davidson (R)	Marcy; Kaptur (D)	Mike; Turner (R)	Marcia; Fudge (D)	Troy; Balderson (R)	Tim; Ryan (D)	David; Joyce (R)	Steve; Stivers (R)	Jim; Renacci (R)
116th (2019–2021)	Steve; Chabot (R)	Brad; Wenstrup (R)	Joyce; Beatty (D)	Jim; Jordan (R)	Bob; Latta (R)	Bill; Johnson (R)	Bob; Gibbs (R)	Warren; Davidson (R)	Marcy; Kaptur (D)	Mike; Turner (R)	Marcia; Fudge (D)	Troy; Balderson (R)	Tim; Ryan (D)	David; Joyce (R)	Steve; Stivers (R)	Anthony; Gonzalez (R)
117th (2021–2023)	Steve; Chabot (R)	Brad; Wenstrup (R)	Joyce; Beatty (D)	Jim; Jordan (R)	Bob; Latta (R)	Bill; Johnson (R)	Bob; Gibbs (R)	Warren; Davidson (R)	Marcy; Kaptur (D)	Mike; Turner (R)	Marcia; Fudge (D)	Troy; Balderson (R)	Tim; Ryan (D)	David; Joyce (R)	Steve; Stivers (R)	Anthony; Gonzalez (R)
117th (2021–2023)	Steve; Chabot (R)	Brad; Wenstrup (R)	Joyce; Beatty (D)	Jim; Jordan (R)	Bob; Latta (R)	Bill; Johnson (R)	Bob; Gibbs (R)	Warren; Davidson (R)	Marcy; Kaptur (D)	Mike; Turner (R)	Shontel; Brown (D)	Troy; Balderson (R)	Tim; Ryan (D)	David; Joyce (R)	Mike; Carey (R)	Anthony; Gonzalez (R)

=== 2023–2033: 15 seats ===
Congress	District														
Congress	1st	2nd	3rd	4th	5th	6th	7th	8th	9th	10th	11th	12th	13th	14th	15th
118th (2023–2025)	Greg; Landsman (D)	Brad; Wenstrup (R)	Joyce; Beatty (D)	Jim; Jordan (R)	Bob; Latta (R)	Bill; Johnson (R)	Max; Miller (R)	Warren; Davidson (R)	Marcy; Kaptur (D)	Mike; Turner (R)	Shontel; Brown (D)	Troy; Balderson (R)	Emilia; Sykes (D)	David; Joyce (R)	Mike; Carey (R)
118th (2023–2025)	Greg; Landsman (D)	Brad; Wenstrup (R)	Joyce; Beatty (D)	Jim; Jordan (R)	Bob; Latta (R)	Michael; Rulli (R)	Max; Miller (R)	Warren; Davidson (R)	Marcy; Kaptur (D)	Mike; Turner (R)	Shontel; Brown (D)	Troy; Balderson (R)	Emilia; Sykes (D)	David; Joyce (R)	Mike; Carey (R)
119th (2025–2027)	Greg; Landsman (D)	David; Taylor (R)	Joyce; Beatty (D)	Jim; Jordan (R)	Bob; Latta (R)	Michael; Rulli (R)	Max; Miller (R)	Warren; Davidson (R)	Marcy; Kaptur (D)	Mike; Turner (R)	Shontel; Brown (D)	Troy; Balderson (R)	Emilia; Sykes (D)	David; Joyce (R)	Mike; Carey (R)
120th (2027–2029)	Greg; Landsman (D)	David; Taylor (R)	Joyce; Beatty (D)	Jim; Jordan (R)	Bob; Latta (R)	Michael; Rulli (R)	Brian; Poindexter (D)	Warren; Davidson (R)	Marcy; Kaptur (D)	Kristina; Knickerbocker (D)	Shontel; Brown (D)	Troy; Balderson (R)	Emilia; Sykes (D)	David; Joyce (R)	Don; Leonard (D)

== U.S. Senate ==
Current U.S. senators from Ohio
Ohio CPVI (2025): R+5	Class I senator	Class III senator
Ohio CPVI (2025): R+5	Bernie Moreno (Senior senator) (Westlake)	Jon Husted (Junior senator) (Upper Arlington)
Party	Republican	Republican
Incumbent since	January 3, 2025	January 18, 2025

Class I senator	Congress	Class III senator
John Smith (DR)	8th (1803–1805)	Thomas Worthington (DR)
John Smith (DR)	9th (1805–1807)	Thomas Worthington (DR)
John Smith (DR)	10th (1807–1809)	Edward Tiffin (DR)
Return J. Meigs Jr. (DR)	10th (1807–1809)	Edward Tiffin (DR)
Return J. Meigs Jr. (DR)	11th (1809–1811)	Stanley Griswold (DR)
Thomas Worthington (DR)	11th (1809–1811)	Alexander Campbell (DR)
Thomas Worthington (DR)	12th (1811–1813)	Alexander Campbell (DR)
Thomas Worthington (DR)	13th (1813–1815)	Jeremiah Morrow (DR)
Joseph Kerr (DR)	13th (1813–1815)	Jeremiah Morrow (DR)
Benjamin Ruggles (DR)	14th (1815–1817)	Jeremiah Morrow (DR)
Benjamin Ruggles (DR)	15th (1817–1819)	Jeremiah Morrow (DR)
Benjamin Ruggles (DR)	16th (1819–1821)	William A. Trimble (DR)
Benjamin Ruggles (DR)	17th (1821–1823)	William A. Trimble (DR)
Benjamin Ruggles (DR)	17th (1821–1823)	Ethan Allen Brown (DR)
Benjamin Ruggles (DR)	18th (1823–1825)	Ethan Allen Brown (DR)
Benjamin Ruggles (NR)	19th (1825–1827)	William Henry; Harrison (NR)
Benjamin Ruggles (NR)	20th (1827–1829)	William Henry; Harrison (NR)
Benjamin Ruggles (NR)	20th (1827–1829)	Jacob Burnet (NR)
Benjamin Ruggles (NR)	21st (1829–1831)	Jacob Burnet (NR)
Benjamin Ruggles (NR)	22nd (1831–1833)	Thomas Ewing (NR)
Thomas Morris (J)	23rd (1833–1835)	Thomas Ewing (NR)
Thomas Morris (J)	24th (1835–1837)	Thomas Ewing (NR)
Thomas Morris (D)	25th (1837–1839)	William Allen (D)
Benjamin Tappan (D)	26th (1839–1841)	William Allen (D)
Benjamin Tappan (D)	27th (1841–1843)	William Allen (D)
Benjamin Tappan (D)	28th (1843–1845)	William Allen (D)
Thomas Corwin (W)	29th (1845–1847)	William Allen (D)
Thomas Corwin (W)	30th (1847–1849)	William Allen (D)
Thomas Corwin (W)	31st (1849–1851)	Salmon P. Chase (FS)
Thomas Ewing (W)	31st (1849–1851)	Salmon P. Chase (FS)
Benjamin Wade (W)	32nd (1851–1853)	Salmon P. Chase (FS)
Benjamin Wade (W)	33rd (1853–1855)	Salmon P. Chase (FS)
Benjamin Wade (R)	34th (1855–1857)	George E. Pugh (D)
Benjamin Wade (R)	35th (1857–1859)	George E. Pugh (D)
Benjamin Wade (R)	36th (1859–1861)	George E. Pugh (D)
Benjamin Wade (R)	37th (1861–1863)	Salmon P. Chase (R)
Benjamin Wade (R)	37th (1861–1863)	John Sherman (R)
Benjamin Wade (R)	38th (1863–1865)	John Sherman (R)
Benjamin Wade (R)	39th (1865–1867)	John Sherman (R)
Benjamin Wade (R)	40th (1867–1869)	John Sherman (R)
Allen G. Thurman (D)	41st (1869–1871)	John Sherman (R)
Allen G. Thurman (D)	42nd (1871–1873)	John Sherman (R)
Allen G. Thurman (D)	43rd (1873–1875)	John Sherman (R)
Allen G. Thurman (D)	44th (1875–1877)	John Sherman (R)
Allen G. Thurman (D)	45th (1877–1879)	Stanley Matthews (R)
Allen G. Thurman (D)	46th (1879–1881)	George H. Pendleton (D)
John Sherman (R)	47th (1881–1883)	George H. Pendleton (D)
John Sherman (R)	48th (1883–1885)	George H. Pendleton (D)
John Sherman (R)	49th (1885–1887)	Henry B. Payne (D)
John Sherman (R)	50th (1887–1889)	Henry B. Payne (D)
John Sherman (R)	51st (1889–1891)	Henry B. Payne (D)
John Sherman (R)	52nd (1891–1893)	Calvin S. Brice (D)
John Sherman (R)	53rd (1893–1895)	Calvin S. Brice (D)
John Sherman (R)	54th (1895–1897)	Calvin S. Brice (D)
Mark Hanna (R)	55th (1897–1899)	Joseph B. Foraker (R)
Mark Hanna (R)	56th (1899–1901)	Joseph B. Foraker (R)
Mark Hanna (R)	57th (1901–1903)	Joseph B. Foraker (R)
Mark Hanna (R)	58th (1903–1905)	Joseph B. Foraker (R)
Charles W. F. Dick (R)	58th (1903–1905)	Joseph B. Foraker (R)
Charles W. F. Dick (R)	59th (1905–1907)	Joseph B. Foraker (R)
Charles W. F. Dick (R)	60th (1907–1909)	Joseph B. Foraker (R)
Charles W. F. Dick (R)	61st (1909–1911)	Theodore E. Burton (R)
Atlee Pomerene (D)	62nd (1911–1913)	Theodore E. Burton (R)
Atlee Pomerene (D)	63rd (1913–1915)	Theodore E. Burton (R)
Atlee Pomerene (D)	64th (1915–1917)	Warren G. Harding (R)
Atlee Pomerene (D)	65th (1917–1919)	Warren G. Harding (R)
Atlee Pomerene (D)	66th (1919–1921)	Warren G. Harding (R)
Atlee Pomerene (D)	66th (1919–1921)	Frank B. Willis (R)
Atlee Pomerene (D)	67th (1921–1923)	Frank B. Willis (R)
Simeon D. Fess (R)	68th (1923–1925)	Frank B. Willis (R)
Simeon D. Fess (R)	69th (1925–1927)	Frank B. Willis (R)
Simeon D. Fess (R)	70th (1927–1929)	Frank B. Willis (R)
Simeon D. Fess (R)	70th (1927–1929)	Cyrus Locher (D)
Simeon D. Fess (R)	70th (1927–1929)	Theodore E. Burton (R)
Simeon D. Fess (R)	71st (1929–1931)	Theodore E. Burton (R)
Simeon D. Fess (R)	71st (1929–1931)	Roscoe C. McCulloch (R)
Simeon D. Fess (R)	71st (1929–1931)	Robert J. Bulkley (D)
Simeon D. Fess (R)	72nd (1931–1933)	Robert J. Bulkley (D)
Simeon D. Fess (R)	73rd (1933–1935)	Robert J. Bulkley (D)
Vic Donahey (D)	74th (1935–1937)	Robert J. Bulkley (D)
Vic Donahey (D)	75th (1937–1939)	Robert J. Bulkley (D)
Vic Donahey (D)	76th (1939–1941)	Robert A. Taft (R)
Harold H. Burton (R)	77th (1941–1943)	Robert A. Taft (R)
Harold H. Burton (R)	78th (1943–1945)	Robert A. Taft (R)
Harold H. Burton (R)	79th (1945–1947)	Robert A. Taft (R)
James W. Huffman (D)	79th (1945–1947)	Robert A. Taft (R)
Kingsley A. Taft (R)	79th (1945–1947)	Robert A. Taft (R)
John W. Bricker (R)	80th (1947–1949)	Robert A. Taft (R)
John W. Bricker (R)	81st (1949–1951)	Robert A. Taft (R)
John W. Bricker (R)	82nd (1951–1953)	Robert A. Taft (R)
John W. Bricker (R)	83rd (1953–1955)	Robert A. Taft (R)
John W. Bricker (R)	83rd (1953–1955)	Thomas A. Burke (D)
John W. Bricker (R)	83rd (1953–1955)	George H. Bender (R)
John W. Bricker (R)	84th (1955–1957)	George H. Bender (R)
John W. Bricker (R)	85th (1957–1959)	Frank Lausche (D)
Stephen M. Young (D)	86th (1959–1961)	Frank Lausche (D)
Stephen M. Young (D)	87th (1961–1963)	Frank Lausche (D)
Stephen M. Young (D)	88th (1963–1965)	Frank Lausche (D)
Stephen M. Young (D)	89th (1965–1967)	Frank Lausche (D)
Stephen M. Young (D)	90th (1967–1969)	Frank Lausche (D)
Stephen M. Young (D)	91st (1969–1971)	William B. Saxbe (R)
Robert Taft Jr. (R)	92nd (1971–1973)	William B. Saxbe (R)
Robert Taft Jr. (R)	93rd (1973–1975)	William B. Saxbe (R)
Robert Taft Jr. (R)	93rd (1973–1975)	Howard Metzenbaum (D)
Robert Taft Jr. (R)	93rd (1973–1975)	John Glenn (D)
Robert Taft Jr. (R)	94th (1975–1977)	John Glenn (D)
Howard Metzenbaum (D)	94th (1975–1977)	John Glenn (D)
Howard Metzenbaum (D)	95th (1977–1979)	John Glenn (D)
Howard Metzenbaum (D)	96th (1979–1981)	John Glenn (D)
Howard Metzenbaum (D)	97th (1981–1983)	John Glenn (D)
Howard Metzenbaum (D)	98th (1983–1985)	John Glenn (D)
Howard Metzenbaum (D)	99th (1985–1987)	John Glenn (D)
Howard Metzenbaum (D)	100th (1987–1989)	John Glenn (D)
Howard Metzenbaum (D)	101st (1989–1991)	John Glenn (D)
Howard Metzenbaum (D)	102nd (1991–1993)	John Glenn (D)
Howard Metzenbaum (D)	103rd (1993–1995)	John Glenn (D)
Mike DeWine (R)	104th (1995–1997)	John Glenn (D)
Mike DeWine (R)	105th (1997–1999)	John Glenn (D)
Mike DeWine (R)	106th (1999–2001)	George Voinovich (R)
Mike DeWine (R)	107th (2001–2003)	George Voinovich (R)
Mike DeWine (R)	108th (2003–2005)	George Voinovich (R)
Mike DeWine (R)	109th (2005–2007)	George Voinovich (R)
Sherrod Brown (D)	110th (2007–2009)	George Voinovich (R)
Sherrod Brown (D)	111th (2009–2011)	George Voinovich (R)
Sherrod Brown (D)	112th (2011–2013)	Rob Portman (R)
Sherrod Brown (D)	113th (2013–2015)	Rob Portman (R)
Sherrod Brown (D)	114th (2015–2017)	Rob Portman (R)
Sherrod Brown (D)	115th (2017–2019)	Rob Portman (R)
Sherrod Brown (D)	116th (2019–2021)	Rob Portman (R)
Sherrod Brown (D)	117th (2021–2023)	Rob Portman (R)
Sherrod Brown (D)	118th (2023–2025)	JD Vance (R)
Bernie Moreno (R)	119th (2025–2027)	JD Vance (R)
Bernie Moreno (R)	119th (2025–2027)	Jon Husted (R)
Bernie Moreno (R)	119th (2025–2027)	Sherrod Brown (D)
Bernie Moreno (R)	120th (2027–2029)	Sherrod Brown (D)

== Key ==
Anti-Masonic (A-M)
Democratic (D)
Democratic-Republican (DR)
Free Soil (FS)
Independent Democrat (ID)
Independent Republican (IR)
Jacksonian (J)
Liberal Republican (LR)
National Republican (NR)
Republican (R)
Whig (W)
Independent (I)

== See also ==
- List of United States congressional districts
- Ohio's congressional districts
- Political party strength in Ohio
