= Congressman Green =

Congressman Green may refer to:

- Al Green (born 1947)
- Frederick Green (1816–1879)
- Mark Green (born 1964)
