= 1853 Ohio Attorney General election =

- October 11, 1853

Nominee	George Wythe McCook	William Harvey Gibson	Cooper K. Watson
Party	Democratic	Whig	Free Soil
Popular vote	149,957	97,394	35,504
Percentage	52.99%	34.41%	12.55%
Attorney General before election
George E. Pugh
Democratic
Elected Attorney General
George Wythe McCook
Democratic

The 1853 Ohio Attorney General election was held on October 11, 1853, to elect the Ohio Attorney General. Democratic incumbent George E. Pugh did not seek re-election. Democratic nominee George Wythe McCook won the election, defeating Whig William Harvey Gibson by eighteen percentage points alongside Free Soil candidate Cooper K. Watson who came in a distant third with twelve percent of the vote.

== General election ==
=== Candidates ===
- George E. Pugh, attorney (Democratic)
- William Harvey Gibson, attorney (Whig)
- Cooper K. Watson, attorney (Free Soil)

=== Results ===
1853 Ohio Attorney General election results
Party	Candidate	Votes	%	±%
Democratic	George Wythe McCook	149,957	52.99%	+0.35%
Whig	William Harvey Gibson	97,394	34.43%	−8.34%
Free Soil	Cooper K. Watson	35,504	12.55%	+7.94%
Write-in	Scattering	146	0.05%	N/A
Total votes		283,001	100.00%	
Democratic hold				
