= Otway Curry =

American politician

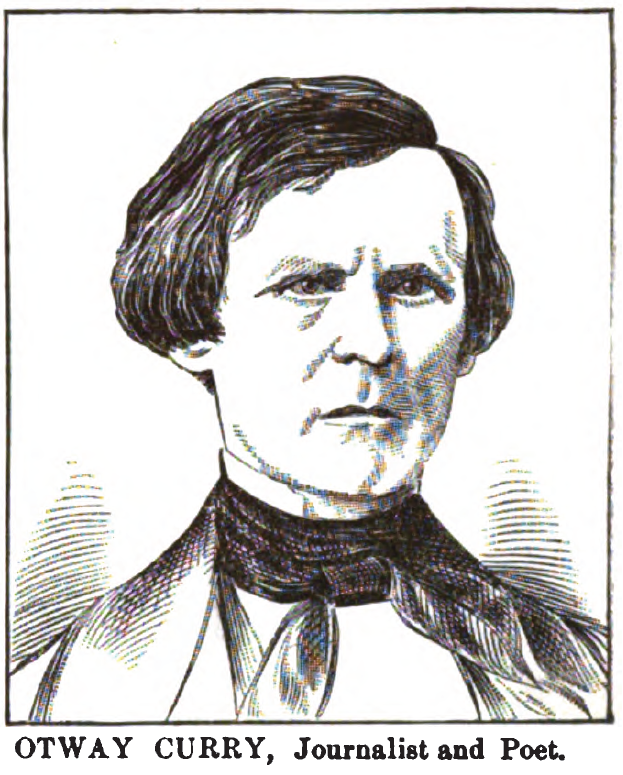
- sketch by Henry Howe

Personal details
- Born: March 26, 1804 Greenfield, Ohio
- Died: February 15, 1855 (aged 50) Marysville, Ohio
- Resting place: Oakdale Cemetery, Marysville
- Spouse: Mary Noteman

Otway Curry (March 26, 1804 – February 15, 1855) was a journalist, poet and legislator in the U.S. State of Ohio.

== Biography ==
Otway Curry was born in Greenfield, Highland County, Ohio. At age 7, in 1811, his family moved to Pleasant Valley, Union County, Ohio. During the War of 1812, his education was interrupted when his father was elected to the Ohio House of Representatives in the then capital of Chillicothe, and his older brother joined the army, leaving Otway at home with his mother. In 1823 he moved to Lebanon, Ohio to learn the carpenter trade, practiced that occupation and began publishing poetry, at times out of state, until 1829, when he began to farm in Union County.

In 1836 and 1837, Curry was elected to the Ohio House of Representatives. In 1838 he was editor of the short-lived Columbus monthly magazine Hesperian, and in 1839 began study of law at Marysville, Ohio.

== Harrison Campaign ==
Curry was an eager supporter of the 1840 Whig candidate for president, William Henry Harrison of Ohio. Campaign songs were a part of campaigning in those days. Two songs from the Harrison campaign of 1840 survived: The Rollicking Tippecanoe and Tyler Too, by Alexander Ross of Zanesville, and Curry's quieter The Buckeye Cabin Song, which some sources claim helped lead to Ohio's nickname as the Buckeye State:

The Buckeye Cabin Song
Oh, where, tell me where, was your Buckeye cabin made?
Oh, where, tell me where, was your Buckeye cabin made?
'Twas built among the merry boys that wield the plow and spade,
Where the log cabin stands, in the bonnie Buckeye shade.
Oh, what, tell me what, is to be your cabin's fate?
Oh, what, tell me what, is to be your cabin's fate?
We'll wheel it to the capital, and place it there elate,
For a token and a sign of the Bonnie Buckeye State!
Oh, why, tell me why, does your Buckeye cabin go?
Oh, why, tell me why, does your Buckeye cabin go?
It goes against the spoilsmen, for well its builders know
It was Harrison that fought for the cabins long ago.
Oh, what, tell me what, then, will little Martin do?
Oh, what, tell me what, then will little Martin do?
He'll 'follow the footsteps' of Price and Swartout too,
While the log cabin rings again with old Tippecanoe.
Oh, who fell before him in battle, tell me who?
Oh, who fell before him in battle, tell me who?
He drove the savage legions, and the British armies too
at the Rapids, and the Thames, and old Tippecanoe!
By whom, tell me whom, will the battle next be won?
By whom, tell me whom, will the next battle be won?
The spoilsmen and leg treasurers will soon begin to run!
And the 'Log Cabin Candidate' will march to Washington!

— Otway Curry, 1840

== Later life ==
Curry was again elected to the Ohio Legislature in 1842. He also bought the Green County Torchlight in Xenia, Ohio that year. He returned to Marysville in 1845, and practiced as a lawyer. He was elected a delegate to Ohio's second Constitutional Convention in 1850, and moved to Chillicothe in 1853, where he purchased the Scioto Gazette, and edited it for a year, until failing health prompted a move back to Marysville, where he died in 1855.

While working as a carpenter, Curry met and married Mary Noteman. He was a Methodist by faith, and a bishop wrote of him "as a man without a spot in his character, of strong domestic nature, whose home to him was a paradise: - a man of fervent piety, and his poetry as the song of a religious soul : a faith that brings heaven nearer to earth and man into fellowship with the angels."

== Notes ==
Ohio House of Representatives
Preceded by James H. Godman	Representative from Marion and Crawford Counties; 1836-1837; Served alongside: John Carey, Stephen Fowler	Succeeded by Stephen Fowler, John Campbell as Marion County Representatives
Preceded by W. C. Lawrence with Union County	Representative from Logan County; 1842-1843	Succeeded by William McBeth
