= John Carey (congressman) =

American congressman from Ohio

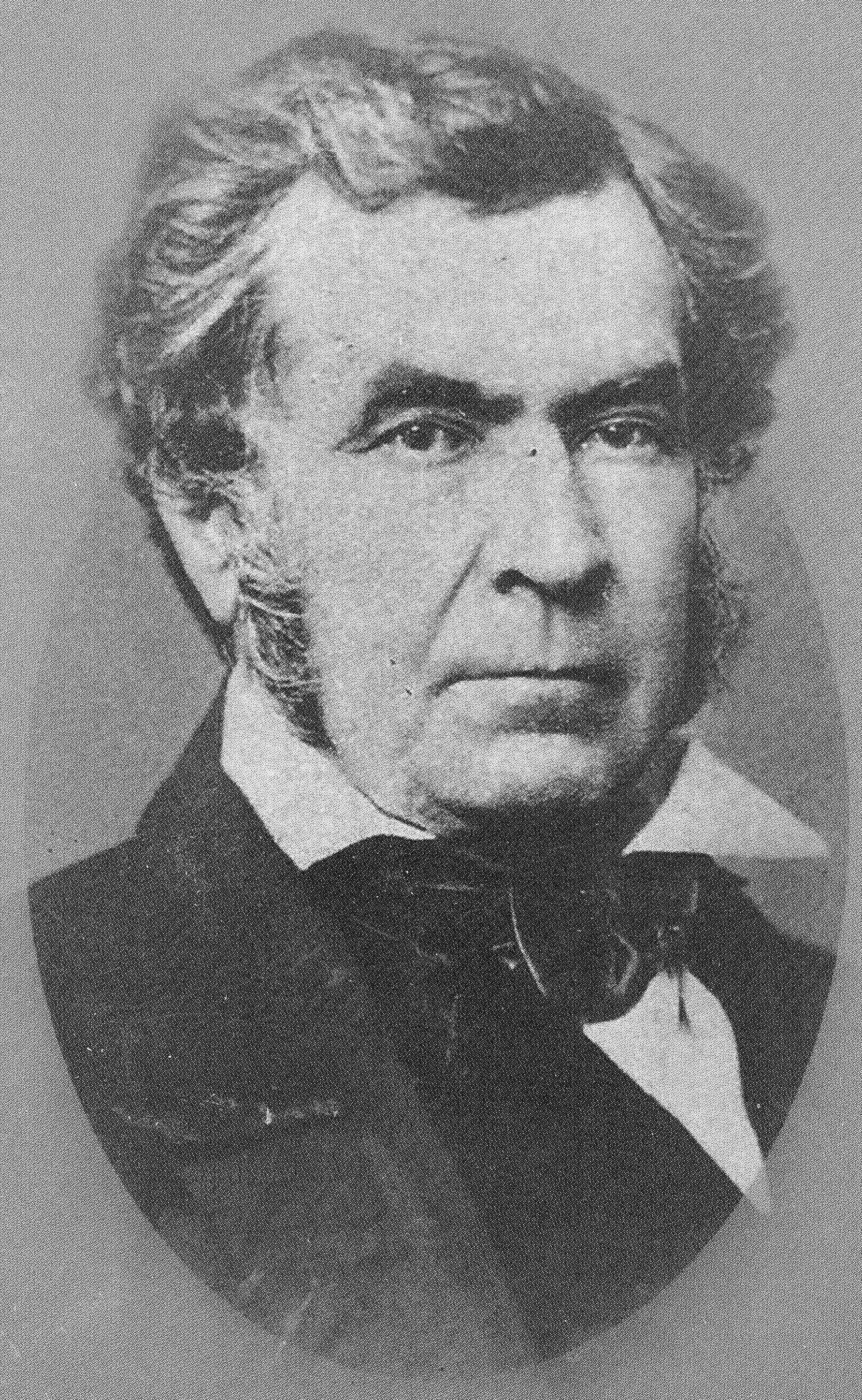

Member of the U.S. House of Representatives from Ohio's 9th district
- In office March 4, 1859 – March 3, 1861
- Preceded by: Lawrence W. Hall
- Succeeded by: Warren P. Noble

Member of the Ohio House of Representatives from the Marion & Crawford county district
- In office December 1, 1828 – December 6, 1829
- Preceded by: new district
- Succeeded by: Robert Hopkins
- In office December 5, 1836 – December 3, 1837 Serving with Otway Curry
- Preceded by: James H. Godman
- Succeeded by: Otway Curry; Stephen Fowler

Member of the Ohio House of Representatives from the Delaware & Crawford county district
- In office December 4, 1843 – December 1, 1844 Serving with William Smart
- Preceded by: George W. Sharp; I. E. James
- Succeeded by: James B. Shaw

Personal details
- Born: April 5, 1792 Monongalia County, Virginia, US
- Died: March 17, 1875 (aged 82) Carey, Ohio, US
- Resting place: Spring Grove Cemetery, Carey, Ohio, US
- Party: Republican
- Spouse: Dorcas Wilcox
- Children: six

John Carey (April 5, 1792 – March 17, 1875) was an American jurist who served as a U.S. representative from Ohio for one term from 1859 to 1861.

== Biography ==
Born in Monongalia County, Virginia (now West Virginia), Carey moved with his parents to the Northwest Territory in 1798.

=== War of 1812 ===
He served under General William Hull in the War of 1812.

=== Early political career ===
He served as associate judge 1825–1832. He was appointed Indian agent at the Wyandotte Reservation in 1829.

He served as member of the Ohio House of Representatives in 1828, 1836, and 1843. Presidential elector in 1840 for Harrison/Tyler. Promoter and first president of the Mad River and Lake Erie Railroad, from Sandusky to Dayton, about 1845. He is the namesake of the town of Carey, Ohio.

=== Congress ===
Carey was elected as a Republican to the Thirty-sixth Congress (March 4, 1859 – March 3, 1861).

=== Death and burial ===
He died in Carey, Ohio, March 17, 1875. He was interred in the family burial ground on the home farm. He was reinterred in 1919 in Spring Grove Cemetery, Carey, Ohio.

== Family ==
John Carey was the second son and third child of Stephen Brown Carey and Sarah Mitten Carey. He married Dorcas Wilcox (1790–1867), of Worthington, Ohio, on January 9, 1817. She was a native of Connecticut. They had six children named Napoleon Bonaparte Carey (1818–1846), MacDonnough Monroe Carey (1820–1895), Emma Marie Carey (1822–1842), Eliza Anne Carey Kinney (1824–1904), Cinderella Carey Brown (1826–1892), and Dorcas Carey Dow (1830–1909).

== Notes ==
U.S. House of Representatives
Preceded by Lawrence W. Hall	Member of the U.S. House of Representatives from Ohio's 9th congressional district March 4, 1859–March 3, 1861	Succeeded by Warren P. Noble
