= Taylor Webster =

American politician (1800–1876)

Member of the U.S. House of Representatives from Ohio's 2nd district
- In office March 4, 1833 – March 3, 1839
- Preceded by: Thomas Corwin
- Succeeded by: John B. Weller

Member of the Ohio House of Representatives from the Butler County district
- In office December 5, 1831 – December 2, 1832 Serving with Jesse Corwin
- Preceded by: John Crane; B. Vangorden
- Succeeded by: Elijah Vance; James Comstock

Personal details
- Born: October 1, 1800 Pennsylvania, US
- Died: April 27, 1876 (aged 75) New Orleans, Louisiana, US
- Resting place: Lafayette Cemetery No. 1 in New Orleans
- Party: Jacksonian; Democratic
- Education: Miami University

Taylor Webster (October 1, 1800 – April 27, 1876) was an American newspaperman and politician who served three terms as a United States representative from Ohio's 2nd congressional district from 1833 to 1839.

== Biography ==
Born in Pennsylvania, Webster moved with his parents to Ohio in 1806, where he received a limited schooling. He briefly attended Miami University in Oxford, Ohio. He was editor and publisher of The Western Telegraph in Hamilton, Ohio, from 1828 to 1836. He served as clerk of the Ohio House of Representatives in 1829 and as a member of that body from 1831 to 1832.

=== Congress ===
Webster was elected as a Jacksonian to the Twenty-third and Twenty-fourth Congresses and as a Democrat to the Twenty-fifth Congress (March 4, 1833 – March 3, 1839). From 1842 to 1846, he was clerk of court of Butler County, Ohio. Thereafter he resumed his business pursuits.

=== Later career and death ===
In 1863, he relocated to New Orleans, Louisiana, to work in a clerical position and died there fourteen years later. He is interred at Lafayette Cemetery No. 1 in New Orleans.

== Sources ==
- United States Congress. "Taylor Webster (id: W000241)". Biographical Directory of the United States Congress.

U.S. House of Representatives
Preceded by Thomas Corwin	Member of the U.S. House of Representatives from Ohio's 2nd congressional district 1833–1839	Succeeded by John B. Weller
