= Lawrence W. Hall =

American politician

Lawrence Washington Hall

Member of the U.S. House of Representatives from Ohio's 9th district
- In office March 4, 1857 – March 3, 1859
- Preceded by: Cooper K. Watson
- Succeeded by: John Carey

Personal details
- Born: c. 1819 Lake County, Ohio
- Died: January 18, 1863 (aged 43–44) Bucyrus, Ohio
- Resting place: Oakwood Cemetery
- Party: Democratic
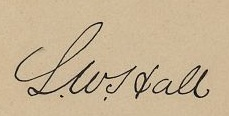
- Signature

Lawrence Washington Hall (c. 1819 – January 18, 1863) was an American lawyer and politician who served as a U.S. representative from Ohio from 1857 to 1859.

== Early life and career ==
Born in Lake County, Ohio, Hall graduated from Hudson College in 1839 where he studied law. He was admitted to the bar in 1843 and began to practice in Bucyrus, Ohio, from 1844.

He served as prosecuting attorney of Crawford County from 1845-1851; then as judge of the Court of Common Pleas from 1852 - 1857.

== Congress ==
Hall was elected as a Democrat to the Thirty-fifth Congress, serving from March 4, 1857, to March 3, 1859.

== Later career and death ==
He subsequently resumed his law practice, having lost the reelection bid. In 1862, during the Civil War, he was imprisoned for alleged disloyalty to the Union.

He died in Bucyrus, Ohio, on January 18, 1863, and was interred in Oakwood Cemetery.

== Sources ==
- United States Congress. "Lawrence W. Hall (id: H000059)". Biographical Directory of the United States Congress.

U.S. House of Representatives
Preceded by Cooper K. Watson	Member of the U.S. House of Representatives from Ohio's 9th congressional district March 4, 1857–March 3, 1859	Succeeded by John Carey
