= Warren P. Noble =

American politician (1820–1903)

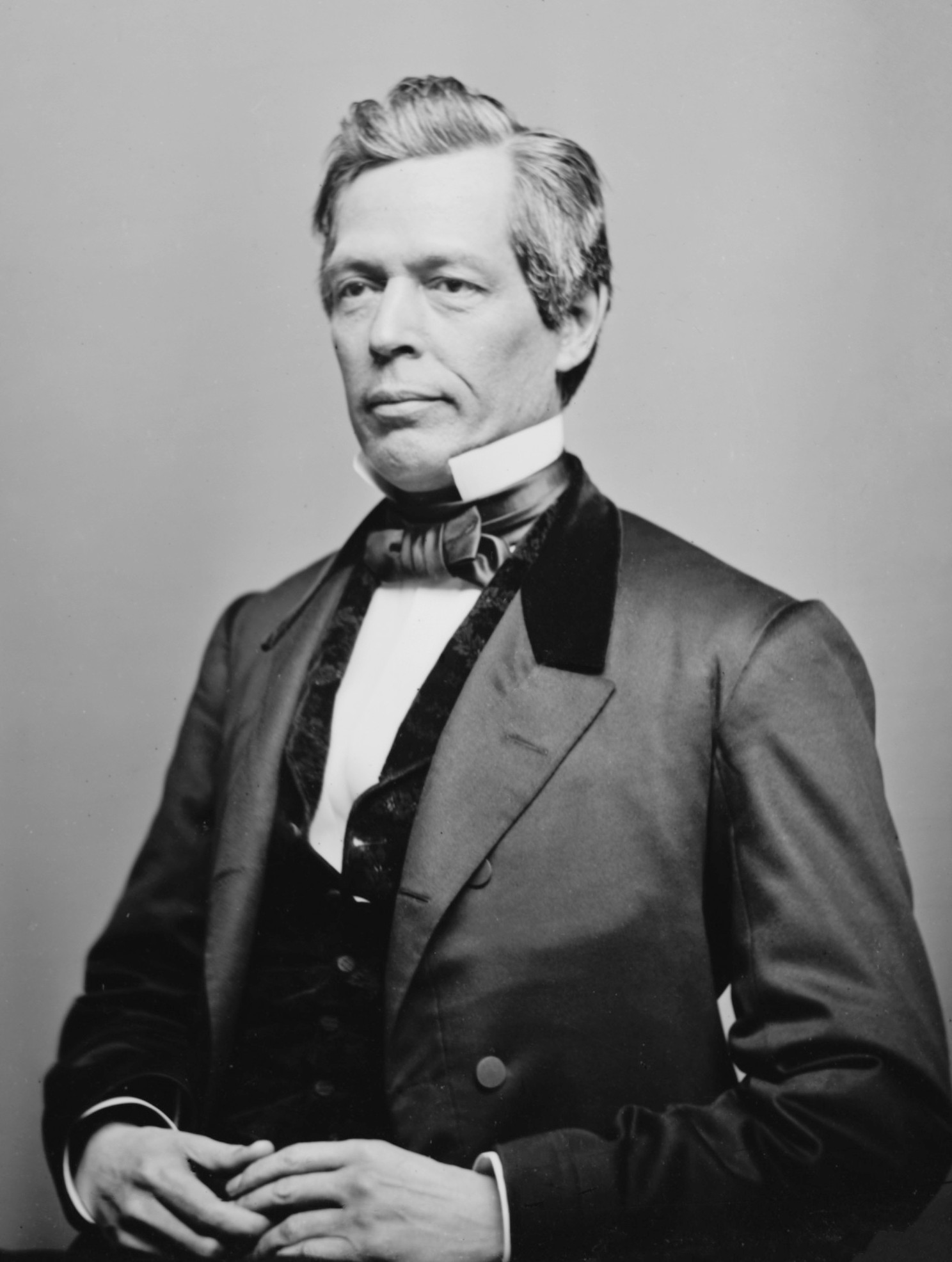
- Noble, 1860–1865

Member of the U.S. House of Representatives from Ohio's 9th district
- In office March 4, 1861 – March 3, 1865
- Preceded by: John Carey
- Succeeded by: Ralph P. Buckland

Member of the Ohio House of Representatives from the Seneca County district
- In office December 7, 1846 – December 3, 1848
- Preceded by: Daniel Brown
- Succeeded by: John G. Breslin

Personal details
- Born: Warren Perry Noble; June 14, 1820 Berwick, Pennsylvania, U.S.
- Died: July 9, 1903 (aged 83) Tiffin, Ohio, U.S.
- Resting place: Greenlawn Cemetery
- Party: Democratic
- Spouse(s): Mary E. Singer; Alice M. Campbell
- Children: five
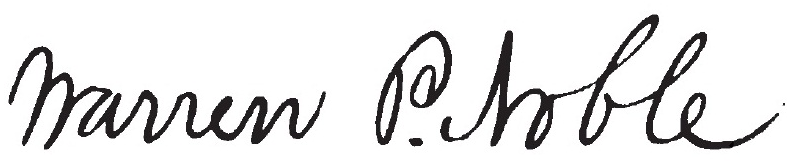
- Signature

Warren Perry Noble (June 14, 1820 – July 9, 1903) was an American educator, lawyer, and politician who served two terms as a U.S. representative from Ohio from 1861 to 1865.

== Early life and career ==
Noble was born in Luzerne County, Pennsylvania near Berwick and eventually moved to Ohio. He was educated in common schools and for part of his career he taught school as well. In 1840 he was graduated from Wadsworth Academy, Wadsworth, Ohio where he studied law. He was admitted to the bar in 1843 and established a legal practice in Tiffin, Ohio.

=== State House ===
Noble served as member of the State house of representatives from 1846 until 1850, and as prosecuting attorney of Seneca County from 1851 until 1854.

== Congress ==
He was elected as a Democrat to both the Thirty-seventh and Thirty-eighth Congresses (March 4, 1861 – March 3, 1865), but was an unsuccessful candidate for reelection to the Thirty-ninth Congress. His vote on the Thirteenth Amendment is recorded as nay.

== Death ==
Subsequent to his career in public office Noble resumed the practice of law in Tiffin, Ohio, where he died on July 9, 1903. He was interred in Greenlawn Cemetery in Tiffin.

== Private life and legacy ==
Noble was a Knight Templar in the Freemasons and an Independent Odd Fellow. He was a director of the Toledo, Tiffin and Eastern Railroad until that line was assumed by the Pennsylvania Railroad. He was a member of the board of trustees of The Ohio State University for ten years.

Noble was the preceptor of the first woman admitted to the bar in Ohio, Mrs. Nettie C. Lutes.

Noble was married in 1847 to Mary E. Singer, who had two daughters and a son before she died March 9, 1853. On September 27, 1873, he married Alice M. Campbell, and they had two daughters.

== Sources ==
- United States Congress. "Warren P. Noble (id: N000119)". Biographical Directory of the United States Congress.

U.S. House of Representatives
Preceded by John Carey	Member of the U.S. House of Representatives from Ohio's 9th congressional district March 4, 1861 – March 3, 1865	Succeeded by Ralph P. Buckland
