= Andrew Ellison =

American politician

Member of the U.S. House of Representatives from Ohio's 6th district
- In office March 4, 1853 – March 3, 1855
- Preceded by: Frederick W. Green
- Succeeded by: Jonas R. Emrie

Member of the Ohio House of Representatives
- In office 1846

Personal details
- Born: c. 1812 West Union, Ohio
- Died: ca. 1860 (aged 47–48)
- Party: Democratic

Andrew Ellison (c. 1812 – ca. 1860) was an American lawyer and politician who served as a U.S. representative from Ohio for one term from 1853 to 1855.

== Biography ==
Born in West Union, Ohio, Ellison attended the public schools. He studied law, was admitted to the bar in Adams County, Ohio, in August 1835 and commenced practice in Georgetown, Ohio, the same year.

Ellison was elected prosecuting attorney of Brown County and served from 1840 to 1843. He served as member of the Ohio House of Representatives in 1846.

Ellison was elected as a Democrat to the Thirty-third Congress (March 4, 1853 – March 3, 1855). He was an unsuccessful candidate for reelection in 1854 to the Thirty-fourth Congress. He resumed the practice of law. He died about 1860.

== Sources ==
- United States Congress. "Andrew Ellison (id: E000140)". Biographical Directory of the United States Congress.

U.S. House of Representatives
Preceded by Frederick W. Green	Member of the U.S. House of Representatives from Ohio's 6th congressional district March 4, 1853–March 3, 1855	Succeeded by Jonas R. Emrie
Ohio House of Representatives
Preceded by J. J. Higgins	Representative from Brown County; December 7, 1846-1863	Succeeded by James C. Kennedy; James H. Smith
