= Cooper K. Watson =

American politician (1810–1880)

Cooper Kinderdine Watson
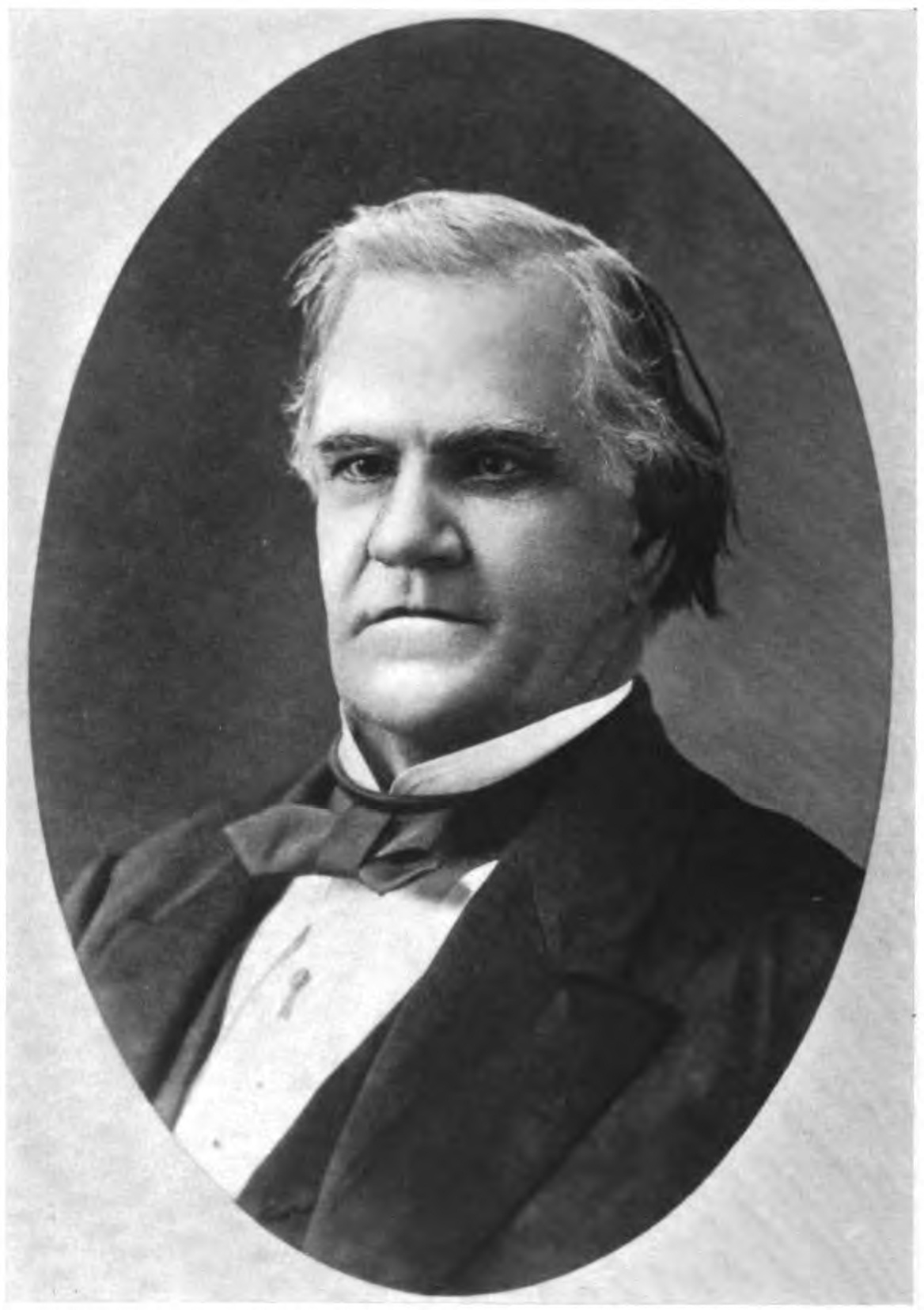

Member of the U.S. House of Representatives from Ohio's 9th district
- In office March 4, 1855 – March 3, 1857
- Preceded by: Frederick W. Green
- Succeeded by: Lawrence W. Hall

Personal details
- Born: June 10, 1810 Jefferson County, Kentucky
- Died: May 20, 1880 (aged 69) Sandusky, Ohio
- Resting place: Greenlawn Cemetery, Tiffin
- Party: Anti-Nebraska
- Spouse: Caroline S. Durkee
- Children: four
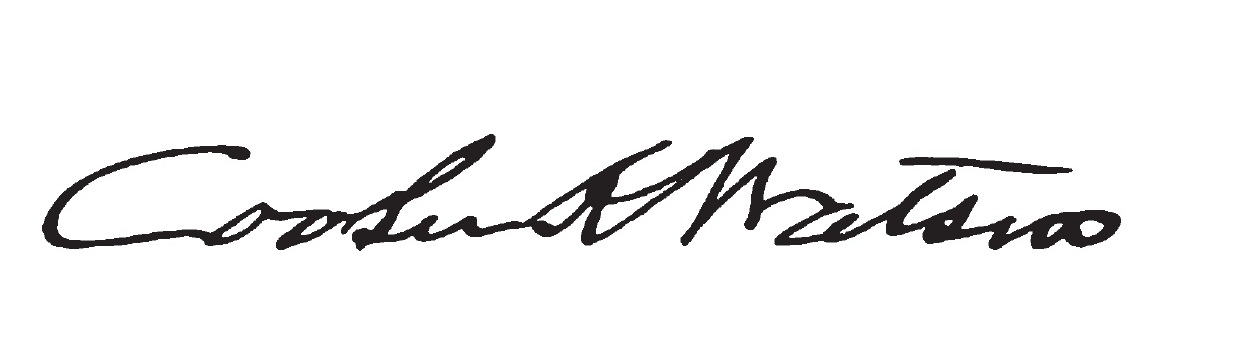
- Signature

Cooper Kinderdine Watson (June 18, 1810 – May 20, 1880, age 69) was a U.S. representative from Ohio.

Born in Jefferson County, Kentucky, Watson pursued preparatory studies. He studied law. He was admitted to the bar and commenced practice in Delaware, Ohio. He moved to Marion, Ohio. He was an unsuccessful candidate for prosecuting attorney of Marion County in 1839. He moved to Tiffin, Ohio, and practiced law for twenty years or more.

Watson was elected as a Republican and Anti-Nebraska to the Thirty-fourth Congress (March 4, 1855 – March 3, 1857). He was an unsuccessful candidate for reelection in 1856 to the Thirty-fifth Congress. He resumed the practice of law. He moved to Sandusky, Ohio. He served as member of the State constitutional convention in 1871. He was appointed judge of the court of common pleas in 1876 and served until his death in Sandusky, Ohio, May 20, 1880. He was interred in Greenlawn Cemetery, Tiffin, Ohio.

In 1830 Watson married Caroline S. Durkee, who survived him with four children.

U.S. House of Representatives
Preceded by Frederick W. Green	Member of the U.S. House of Representatives from Ohio's 9th congressional district March 4, 1855–March 3, 1857	Succeeded by Lawrence W. Hall
