= Frederick W. Green (Ohio politician) =

American politician

Frederick William Green

Member of the U.S. House of Representatives from Ohio
- In office March 4, 1851 – March 3, 1855
- Preceded by: John Bell
- Succeeded by: Cooper K. Watson
- Constituency: 6th district (1851–1853); 9th district (1853–1855)

Personal details
- Born: February 18, 1816 Fredericktown, Maryland
- Died: June 18, 1879 (aged 63) Cleveland, Ohio
- Resting place: Woodland, Cemetery
- Party: Democratic

Frederick William Green (February 18, 1816 – June 18, 1879) was a lawyer, newspaperman, and a two-term U.S. representative from Ohio from 1851 to 1855.

== Early life and career ==
Born in Fredericktown (now Frederick), Maryland, Green settled in Tiffin, Ohio, in 1833. He pursued an academic course and then studied law. He was admitted to the bar and commenced practice in Tiffin. He served as Auditor of Seneca County for six years.

== Congress ==
Green was elected as a Democrat to the Thirty-second and Thirty-third Congresses (March 4, 1851 – March 3, 1855). He was not a candidate for renomination. He subsequently moved to Cleveland, Ohio, and served as clerk of the United States District Court for the Northern District of Ohio from 1855 to 1866.

== After Congress ==
He was the editor of The Plain Dealer 1866–1874. Green was one of the Ohio commissioners to the Philadelphia Centennial Exposition in 1876. He served as a state oil inspector in 1878 and 1879.

== Death ==
He died in Cleveland and was interred in Woodland Cemetery.

== Sources ==
- United States Congress. "Frederick William Green (id: G000409)". Biographical Directory of the United States Congress.

== Bibliography ==
- Spencer, Thomas E. (1995). Where They're Buried: A Directory Containing More Than Twenty Thousand Names of Notable Persons Buried in American Cemeteries, With Listings of Many Prominent People Who Were Cremated. Baltimore, Md.: Clearfield Co. ISBN 9780806348230.

U.S. House of Representatives
Preceded by John Bell	Member of the U.S. House of Representatives from Ohio's 6th congressional district 1851–1853	Succeeded by Andrew Ellison
Preceded by Edson B. Olds	Member of the U.S. House of Representatives from Ohio's 9th congressional district 1853–1855	Succeeded by Cooper K. Watson
