= List of United States representatives from Ohio =

The following is an alphabetical list of United States representatives from the state of Ohio. For chronological tables of members of both houses of the United States Congress from the state (through the present day), see Ohio's congressional delegations.

== Current representatives ==
Last updated January 3, 2025

- 1st district: Greg Landsman (D) (since 2023)
- 2nd district: David Taylor (R) (since 2025)
- 3rd district: Joyce Beatty (D) (since 2013)
- 4th district: Jim Jordan (R) (since 2007)
- 5th district: Bob Latta (R) (since 2007)
- 6th district: Michael Rulli (R) (since 2024)
- 7th district: Max Miller (R) (since 2023)
- 8th district: Warren Davidson (R) (since 2016)
- 9th district: Marcy Kaptur (D) (since 1983)
- 10th district: Mike Turner (R) (since 2003)
- 11th district: Shontel Brown (D) (since 2021)
- 12th district: Troy Balderson (R) (since 2018)
- 13th district: Emilia Sykes (D) (since 2023)
- 14th district: David Joyce (R) (since 2013)
- 15th district: Mike Carey (R) (since 2021)

== List of members ==
Member	Party	Years	District	Electoral history
Pete Abele	Republican	January 3, 1963 – January 3, 1965	10th	Lost re-election
Walter H. Albaugh	Republican	November 8, 1938 – January 3, 1939	4th	Elected to finish Frank L. Kloeb's term Retired
Charles J. Albright	Anti-Nebraska	March 4, 1855 – March 3, 1857	17th	Lost re-election
Arthur W. Aleshire	Democratic	January 3, 1937 – January 3, 1939	7th	[data missing]
James Alexander Jr.	Whig	March 4, 1837 – March 4, 1839	11th	[data missing]
John Alexander	Democratic-Republican	March 4, 1813 – March 4, 1817	2nd	[data missing]
Alfred G. Allen	Democratic	March 4, 1911 – March 4, 1917	2nd	[data missing]
John W. Allen	Whig	March 4, 1837 – March 4, 1841	15th	[data missing]
William Allen	Democratic	March 4, 1859 – March 4, 1863	4th	[data missing]
William Allen	Jacksonian	March 4, 1833 – March 4, 1835	7th	[data missing]
Jacob A. Ambler	Republican	March 4, 1869 – March 4, 1873	17th	[data missing]
Carl C. Anderson	Democratic	March 4, 1909 – October 1, 1912	13th	Died
Charles Marley Anderson	Democratic	March 4, 1885 – March 4, 1887	4th	[data missing]
Sherlock J. Andrews	Whig	March 4, 1841 – March 4, 1843	15th	[data missing]
Timothy T. Ansberry	Democratic	March 4, 1907 – January 9, 1915	5th	Resigned when appointed to the Ohio Court of Appeals
Douglas Applegate	Democratic	January 3, 1977 – January 3, 1995	18th	[data missing]
Jean Spencer Ashbrook	Republican	June 29, 1982 – January 3, 1983	17th	[data missing]
John M. Ashbrook	Republican	January 3, 1961 – April 24, 1982	17th	Died
William A. Ashbrook	Democratic	March 4, 1907 – March 4, 1921	17th	[data missing]
William A. Ashbrook	Democratic	January 3, 1935 – January 1, 1940	17th	Died
James Mitchell Ashley	Republican	March 4, 1859 – March 4, 1863	5th	[data missing]
James Mitchell Ashley	Republican	March 4, 1863 – March 4, 1869	10th	[data missing]
Thomas W. L. Ashley	Democratic	January 3, 1955 – January 3, 1981	9th	[data missing]
Gibson Atherton	Democratic	March 4, 1879 – March 4, 1881	14th	[data missing]
Gibson Atherton	Democratic	March 4, 1881 – March 4, 1883	13th	[data missing]
Steve Austria	Republican	January 3, 2009 – January 3, 2013	7th	[data missing]
William H. Ayres	Republican	January 3, 1951 – January 3, 1971	14th	[data missing]
John J. Babka	Democratic	March 4, 1919 – March 4, 1921	21st	[data missing]
De Witt Clinton Badger	Democratic	March 4, 1903 – March 4, 1905	12th	[data missing]
Joe E. Baird	Republican	March 4, 1929 – March 4, 1931	13th	[data missing]
Troy Balderson	Republican	September 5, 2018 – present	12th	Incumbent
Edward Ball	Whig	March 4, 1853 – March 4, 1855	16th	[data missing]
Edward Ball	Anti-Nebraska	March 4, 1855 – March 4, 1857	16th	[data missing]
Henry B. Banning	Liberal Republican	March 4, 1873 – March 4, 1875	2nd	[data missing]
Henry B. Banning	Democratic	March 4, 1875 – March 4, 1879	2nd	[data missing]
Henry T. Bannon	Republican	March 4, 1905 – March 4, 1909	10th	[data missing]
Levi Barber	Democratic-Republican	March 4, 1817 – March 4, 1819	3rd	[data missing]
Levi Barber	Democratic-Republican	March 4, 1821 – March 4, 1823	3rd	[data missing]
Nelson Barrere	Whig	March 4, 1851 – March 4, 1853	7th	[data missing]
Mordecai Bartley	Democratic-Republican	March 4, 1823 – March 4, 1825	14th	[data missing]
Mordecai Bartley	Anti-Jacksonian	March 4, 1825 – March 4, 1829	14th	[data missing]
Mordecai Bartley	Anti-Jacksonian	March 4, 1829 – March 4, 1831	14th	[data missing]
Ellsworth Raymond Bathrick	Democratic	March 4, 1911 – March 4, 1915	19th	[data missing]
Ellsworth Raymond Bathrick	Democratic	March 4, 1917 – December 23, 1917	14th	Died
A. David Baumhart Jr.	Republican	January 3, 1941 – September 2, 1942	13th	Resigned after receiving a commission in the United States Navy
A. David Baumhart Jr.	Republican	January 3, 1955 – January 3, 1961	13th	[data missing]
Clifton Bailey Beach	Republican	March 4, 1895 – March 4, 1899	20th	[data missing]
Reasin Beall	Democratic-Republican	April 20, 1813 – June 7, 1814	6th	Resigned
John Beatty	Republican	February 5, 1868 – March 4, 1873	8th	[data missing]
Joyce Beatty	Democratic	January 3, 2013 – present	3rd	Incumbent
Philemon Beecher	Democratic-Republican	March 4, 1817 – March 4, 1821	5th	[data missing]
Philemon Beecher	Democratic-Republican	March 4, 1823 – March 4, 1825	9th	[data missing]
Philemon Beecher	Anti-Jacksonian	March 4, 1825 – March 4, 1829	9th	[data missing]
James T. Begg	Republican	March 4, 1919 – March 4, 1929	13th	[data missing]
Jacob A. Beidler	Republican	March 4, 1901 – March 4, 1907	20th	[data missing]
Hiram Bell	Whig	March 4, 1851 – March 4, 1853	3rd	[data missing]
James Martin Bell	Anti-Jacksonian	March 4, 1833 – March 4, 1835	11th	[data missing]
John Bell	Whig	January 7, 1851 – March 4, 1851	6th	[data missing]
George H. Bender	Republican	January 3, 1939 – January 3, 1949	At-large	[data missing]
George H. Bender	Republican	January 3, 1951 – January 3, 1953	At-large	Resigned after being elected to the US Senate
George H. Bender	Republican	January 3, 1953 – December 15, 1954	23rd	Resigned after being elected to the US Senate
John Berry	Democratic	March 4, 1873 – March 4, 1875	14th	[data missing]
Jackson E. Betts	Republican	January 3, 1951 – January 3, 1973	8th	[data missing]
Herbert S. Bigelow	Democratic	January 3, 1937 – January 3, 1939	2nd	[data missing]
John A. Bingham	Anti-Nebraska	March 4, 1855 – March 4, 1857	21st	[data missing]
John A. Bingham	Republican	March 4, 1857 – March 4, 1863	21st	[data missing]
John A. Bingham	Republican	March 4, 1865 – March 4, 1873	16th	[data missing]
Harrison Gray Otis Blake	Republican	October 11, 1859 – March 4, 1863	14th	[data missing]
Philemon Bliss	Anti-Nebraska	March 4, 1855 – March 4, 1857	14th	[data missing]
Philemon Bliss	Republican	March 4, 1857 – March 4, 1859	14th	[data missing]
George Bliss	Democratic	March 4, 1853 – March 4, 1855	18th	[data missing]
George Bliss	Democratic	March 4, 1863 – March 4, 1865	14th	[data missing]
John Boccieri	Democratic	January 3, 2009 – January 3, 2011	16th	[data missing]
John Boehner	Republican	January 3, 1991 – October 31, 2015	8th	Speaker of the House 2011-2015
Frances P. Bolton	Republican	February 27, 1940 – January 3, 1969	22nd	[data missing]
Chester C. Bolton	Republican	March 4, 1929 – January 3, 1937	22nd	[data missing]
Chester C. Bolton	Republican	January 3, 1939 – October 29, 1939	22nd	Died
Oliver P. Bolton	Republican	January 3, 1953 – January 3, 1957	11th	[data missing]
Oliver P. Bolton	Republican	January 3, 1963 – January 3, 1965	11th	[data missing]
William K. Bond	Anti-Jacksonian	March 4, 1835 – March 4, 1837	7th	[data missing]
William K. Bond	Whig	March 4, 1837 – March 4, 1841	7th	[data missing]
Melvin M. Boothman	Republican	March 4, 1887 – March 4, 1891	6th	[data missing]
Frank T. Bow	Republican	January 3, 1951 – November 13, 1972	16th	Died
Stanley Eyre Bowdle	Democratic	March 4, 1913 – March 4, 1915	1st	[data missing]
Charles Brand	Republican	March 4, 1923 – March 4, 1933	7th	[data missing]
Edward G. Breen	Democratic	January 3, 1949 – October 1, 1951	3rd	Resigned
Walter E. Brehm	Republican	January 3, 1943 – January 3, 1953	11th	[data missing]
John Lewis Brenner	Democratic	March 4, 1897 – March 4, 1901	3rd	[data missing]
Henry R. Brinkerhoff	Democratic	March 4, 1843 – April 30, 1844	21st	Died
Jacob Brinkerhoff	Democratic	March 4, 1843 – March 4, 1847	11th	[data missing]
Jacob H. Bromwell	Republican	December 3, 1894 – March 4, 1903	2nd	[data missing]
Bud Brown	Republican	November 2, 1965 – January 3, 1983	7th	[data missing]
Charles E. Brown	Republican	March 4, 1885 – March 4, 1889	2nd	[data missing]
Clarence J. Brown	Republican	January 3, 1939 – August 23, 1965	7th	Died
Seth W. Brown	Republican	March 4, 1897 – March 4, 1901	6th	[data missing]
Sherrod Brown	Democratic	January 3, 1993 – January 3, 2007	13th	[data missing]
Shontel Brown	Democratic	November 2, 2021 – present	11th	Incumbent, elected to finish Marcia Fudge's term
Clement L. Brumbaugh	Democratic	March 4, 1913 – March 4, 1921	12th	[data missing]
Henry Brush	Democratic-Republican	March 4, 1819 – March 4, 1821	3rd	[data missing]
Ralph P. Buckland	Republican	March 4, 1865 – March 4, 1869	9th	[data missing]
Robert J. Bulkley	Democratic	March 4, 1911 – March 4, 1915	21st	[data missing]
Hezekiah S. Bundy	Republican	March 4, 1865 – March 4, 1867	11th	[data missing]
Hezekiah S. Bundy	Republican	March 4, 1873 – March 4, 1875	11th	[data missing]
Hezekiah S. Bundy	Republican	December 4, 1893 – March 4, 1895	10th	[data missing]
Raymond H. Burke	Republican	January 3, 1947 – January 3, 1949	3rd	[data missing]
Thomas H. Burke	Democratic	January 3, 1949 – January 3, 1951	9th	[data missing]
Joseph Burns	Democratic	March 4, 1857 – March 4, 1859	15th	[data missing]
Theodore E. Burton	Republican	March 4, 1889 – March 4, 1891	21st	[data missing]
Theodore E. Burton	Republican	March 4, 1895 – March 3, 1909	21st	Resigned after being elected to the U.S. Senate
Theodore E. Burton	Republican	March 4, 1921 – December 15, 1928	22nd	Resigned after being elected to the U.S. Senate
George H. Busby	Democratic	March 4, 1851 – March 4, 1853	11th	[data missing]
Benjamin Butterworth	Republican	March 4, 1879 – March 4, 1883	1st	[data missing]
Benjamin Butterworth	Republican	March 4, 1881 – March 4, 1883	11th	[data missing]
Benjamin Butterworth	Republican	March 4, 1885 – March 4, 1891	1st	[data missing]
Joseph Cable	Democratic	March 4, 1849 – March 4, 1853	17th	[data missing]
John L. Cable	Republican	March 4, 1921 – March 4, 1925	4th	[data missing]
John L. Cable	Republican	March 4, 1929 – March 4, 1933	4th	[data missing]
James Caldwell	Democratic-Republican	March 4, 1813 – March 4, 1817	4th	[data missing]
John A. Caldwell	Republican	March 4, 1889 – May 4, 1894	2nd	Resigned after being elected Mayor of Cincinnati
James E. Campbell	Democratic	June 20, 1884 – March 4, 1885	7th	[data missing]
James E. Campbell	Democratic	March 4, 1885 – March 4, 1887	3rd	[data missing]
James E. Campbell	Democratic	March 4, 1887 – March 4, 1889	7th	[data missing]
John Wilson Campbell	Democratic-Republican	March 4, 1817 – March 4, 1823	2nd	[data missing]
John Wilson Campbell	Democratic-Republican	March 4, 1823 – March 4, 1825	5th	[data missing]
John Wilson Campbell	Anti-Jacksonian	March 4, 1825 – March 4, 1827	5th	[data missing]
Lewis D. Campbell	Whig	March 4, 1849 – March 4, 1853	2nd	[data missing]
Lewis D. Campbell	Whig	March 4, 1853 – March 3, 1855	3rd	[data missing]
Lewis D. Campbell	Anti-Nebraska	March 4, 1855 – March 4, 1857	3rd	[data missing]
Lewis D. Campbell	Republican	March 4, 1857 – May 25, 1858	3rd	Lost election challenge
Lewis D. Campbell	Democratic	March 4, 1871 – March 4, 1873	3rd	[data missing]
William Wildman Campbell	Republican	March 4, 1905 – March 4, 1907	5th	[data missing]
Richard S. Canby	Whig	March 4, 1847 – March 4, 1849	4th	[data missing]
Mike Carey	Republican	November 2, 2021 – present	15th	Incumbent, elected to finish Steve Stivers's term
John Carey	Republican	March 4, 1859 – March 4, 1861	9th	[data missing]
Charles J. Carney	Democratic	November 3, 1970 – January 3, 1979	19th	[data missing]
Henderson H. Carson	Republican	January 3, 1943 – January 3, 1945	16th	[data missing]
Henderson H. Carson	Republican	January 3, 1947 – January 3, 1949	16th	[data missing]
David K. Cartter	Democratic	March 4, 1849 – March 4, 1853	18th	[data missing]
Samuel Fenton Cary	Independent Republican	November 21, 1867 – March 4, 1869	2nd	[data missing]
James H. Cassidy	Republican	March 4, 1909 – March 4, 1911	21st	[data missing]
John W. Cassingham	Democratic	March 4, 1901 – March 4, 1905	17th	[data missing]
Steve Chabot	Republican	January 3, 1995 – January 3, 2009	1st	[data missing]
Steve Chabot	Republican	January 3, 2011 – January 3, 2023	1st	Lost re-election to Landsman.
William W. Chalmers	Republican	March 4, 1921 – March 4, 1923	9th	[data missing]
William W. Chalmers	Republican	March 4, 1925 – March 4, 1931	9th	[data missing]
David Chambers	Democratic-Republican	October 9, 1821 – March 4, 1823	4th	[data missing]
John Chaney	Jacksonian	March 4, 1833 – March 4, 1837	9th	[data missing]
John Chaney	Democratic	March 4, 1837 – March 4, 1839	9th	[data missing]
Donald D. Clancy	Republican	January 3, 1961 – January 3, 1977	2nd	[data missing]
Reader W. Clarke	Republican	March 4, 1865 – March 4, 1869	6th	[data missing]
Harold K. Claypool	Democratic	January 3, 1937 – January 3, 1943	11th	[data missing]
Horatio C. Claypool	Democratic	March 4, 1911 – March 4, 1915	11th	[data missing]
Horatio C. Claypool	Democratic	March 4, 1917 – March 4, 1919	11th	[data missing]
David Clendenin	Democratic-Republican	October 11, 1814 – March 4, 1817	6th	[data missing]
Cliff Clevenger	Republican	January 3, 1939 – January 3, 1959	5th	[data missing]
Joseph R. Cockerill	Democratic	March 4, 1857 – March 4, 1859	6th	[data missing]
Charles D. Coffin	Whig	December 20, 1837 – March 4, 1839	17th	[data missing]
R. Clint Cole	Republican	March 4, 1919 – March 4, 1925	8th	[data missing]
Ralph D. Cole	Republican	March 4, 1905 – March 4, 1911	8th	[data missing]
George L. Converse	Democratic	March 4, 1879 – March 4, 1881	9th	[data missing]
George L. Converse	Democratic	March 4, 1881 – March 4, 1883	12th	[data missing]
George L. Converse	Democratic	March 4, 1883 – March 4, 1885	13th	[data missing]
Robert E. Cook	Democratic	January 3, 1959 – January 3, 1963	11th	[data missing]
Eleutheros Cooke	Anti-Jacksonian	March 4, 1831 – March 4, 1833	14th	[data missing]
John G. Cooper	Republican	March 4, 1915 – January 3, 1937	19th	[data missing]
William C. Cooper	Republican	March 4, 1885 – March 4, 1891	9th	[data missing]
Moses B. Corwin	Whig	March 4, 1849 – March 4, 1851	4th	[data missing]
Moses B. Corwin	Whig	March 4, 1853 – March 4, 1855	8th	[data missing]
Thomas Corwin	Anti-Jacksonian	March 4, 1831 – March 4, 1833	2nd	[data missing]
Thomas Corwin	Anti-Jacksonian	March 4, 1833 – March 4, 1837	4th	[data missing]
Thomas Corwin	Whig	March 4, 1837 – May 30, 1840	4th	Resigned after being nominated Governor
Thomas Corwin	Republican	March 4, 1859 – March 12, 1861	7th	Resigned to become Minister to Mexico
Jacob P. Cowan	Democratic	March 4, 1875 – March 4, 1877	14th	[data missing]
Benjamin S. Cowen	Whig	March 4, 1841 – March 4, 1843	11th	[data missing]
Jacob D. Cox	Republican	March 4, 1877 – March 4, 1879	6th	[data missing]
James M. Cox	Democratic	March 4, 1909 – January 12, 1913	3rd	Resigned after being elected Governor
Samuel S. Cox	Democratic	March 4, 1857 – March 4, 1863	12th	[data missing]
Samuel S. Cox	Democratic	March 4, 1863 – March 4, 1865	7th	[data missing]
Joseph Halsey Crane	Anti-Jacksonian	March 4, 1829 – March 4, 1837	3rd	Retired
William Creighton Jr.	Democratic-Republican	May 4, 1813 – March 4, 1817	3rd	[data missing]
William Creighton Jr.	Anti-Jacksonian	March 4, 1827 – ??, 1828	6th	Resigned after being appointed as judge of the US District Court of Ohio
William Creighton Jr.	Anti-Jacksonian	March 4, 1829 – March 4, 1833	6th	[data missing]
Frank Cremeans	Republican	January 3, 1995 – January 3, 1997	6th	[data missing]
Robert Crosser	Democratic	March 4, 1913 – March 4, 1915	At-large	[data missing]
Robert Crosser	Democratic	March 4, 1915 – March 4, 1919	21st	[data missing]
Robert Crosser	Democratic	March 4, 1923 – January 3, 1955	21st	[data missing]
George W. Crouse	Republican	March 4, 1887 – March 4, 1889	20th	[data missing]
John Crowell	Whig	March 4, 1847 – March 4, 1851	19th	[data missing]
John D. Cummins	Democratic	March 4, 1845 – March 4, 1849	16th	[data missing]
Francis A. Cunningham	Democratic	March 4, 1845 – March 4, 1847	2nd	[data missing]
William P. Cutler	Republican	March 4, 1861 – March 4, 1863	16th	[data missing]
Lorenzo Danford	Republican	March 4, 1873 – March 4, 1879	16th	[data missing]
Lorenzo Danford	Republican	March 4, 1895 – June 19, 1899	16th	Died
John Davenport	Anti-Jacksonian	March 4, 1827 – March 4, 1829	10th	[data missing]
Martin L. Davey	Democratic	November 5, 1918 – March 4, 1921	14th	[data missing]
Martin L. Davey	Democratic	March 4, 1923 – March 4, 1929	14th	[data missing]
Warren Davidson	Republican	June 9, 2016 – present	8th	Incumbent
Jacob E. Davis	Democratic	January 3, 1941 – January 3, 1943	6th	[data missing]
Beman G. Dawes	Republican	March 4, 1905 – March 4, 1909	15th	[data missing]
Rufus Dawes	Republican	March 4, 1881 – March 4, 1883	15th	[data missing]
Timothy Crane Day	Anti-Nebraska	March 4, 1855 – March 4, 1857	1st	[data missing]
Francis Byron De Witt	Republican	March 4, 1895 – March 4, 1897	5th	[data missing]
Ezra Dean	Democratic	March 4, 1841 – March 4, 1845	18th	[data missing]
Columbus Delano	Whig	March 4, 1845 – March 4, 1847	10th	[data missing]
Columbus Delano	Republican	March 4, 1865 – March 4, 1867	13th	[data missing]
Columbus Delano	Republican	June 3, 1868 – March 4, 1869	13th	[data missing]
David S. Dennison Jr.	Republican	January 3, 1957 – January 3, 1959	11th	[data missing]
Matthew R. Denver	Democratic	March 4, 1907 – March 4, 1913	6th	[data missing]
Samuel L. Devine	Republican	January 3, 1959 – January 3, 1981	12th	[data missing]
Mike DeWine	Republican	January 3, 1983 – January 3, 1991	7th	[data missing]
Charles W. F. Dick	Republican	November 8, 1898 – March 23, 1904	19th	Resigned to become a US Senator
Henry L. Dickey	Democratic	March 4, 1877 – March 4, 1879	7th	[data missing]
Henry L. Dickey	Democratic	March 4, 1879 – March 4, 1881	11th	[data missing]
Edward F. Dickinson	Democratic	March 4, 1869 – March 4, 1871	9th	[data missing]
Rodolphus Dickinson	Democratic	March 4, 1847 – March 20, 1849	6th	Died
David Tiernan Disney	Democratic	March 4, 1849 – March 4, 1855	1st	[data missing]
Joseph A. Dixon	Democratic	January 3, 1937 – January 3, 1939	1st	[data missing]
Robert E. Doan	Republican	March 4, 1891 – March 4, 1893	10th	[data missing]
William Doan	Democratic	March 4, 1839 – March 4, 1843	5th	[data missing]
Ozro John Dodds	Democratic	October 8, 1872 – March 4, 1873	1st	[data missing]
Dennis D. Donovan	Democratic	March 4, 1891 – March 4, 1893	6th	[data missing]
Dennis D. Donovan	Democratic	March 4, 1893 – March 4, 1895	5th	[data missing]
Albert Douglas	Republican	March 4, 1907 – March 4, 1911	11th	[data missing]
Steve Driehaus	Democratic	January 3, 2009 – January 3, 2011	1st	[data missing]
Warren J. Duffey	Democratic	March 4, 1933 – July 7, 1936	9th	Died
Daniel Duncan	Whig	March 4, 1847 – March 4, 1849	10th	[data missing]
Alexander Duncan	Democratic	March 4, 1837 – March 4, 1841	1st	[data missing]
Alexander Duncan	Democratic	March 4, 1843 – March 4, 1845	1st	[data missing]
James I. Dungan	Democratic	March 4, 1891 – March 4, 1893	13th	[data missing]
Daniel S. Earhart	Democratic	November 3, 1936 – January 3, 1937	At-large	[data missing]
Dennis E. Eckart	Democratic	January 3, 1981 – January 3, 1983	22nd	[data missing]
Dennis E. Eckart	Democratic	January 3, 1983 – January 3, 1993	11th	[data missing]
Ephraim R. Eckley	Republican	March 4, 1863 – March 4, 1869	17th	[data missing]
Alfred Peck Edgerton	Democratic	March 4, 1851 – March 4, 1855	5th	[data missing]
Sidney Edgerton	Republican	March 4, 1859 – March 4, 1863	18th	[data missing]
Thomas O. Edwards	Whig	March 4, 1847 – March 4, 1849	9th	[data missing]
Benjamin Eggleston	Republican	March 4, 1865 – March 4, 1869	1st	[data missing]
Andrew Ellison	Democratic	March 4, 1853 – March 4, 1855	6th	[data missing]
William W. Ellsberry	Democratic	March 4, 1885 – March 4, 1887	11th	[data missing]
Charles H. Elston	Republican	January 3, 1939 – January 3, 1953	1st	[data missing]
Henry Ivory Emerson	Republican	March 4, 1915 – March 4, 1921	22nd	[data missing]
Jonas R. Emrie	Anti-Nebraska	March 4, 1855 – March 4, 1857	6th	[data missing]
William H. Enochs	Republican	March 4, 1891 – March 4, 1893	12th	[data missing]
William H. Enochs	Republican	March 4, 1893 – July 13, 1893	10th	Died
Nathan Evans	Whig	March 4, 1847 – March 4, 1851	14th	[data missing]
Thomas Ewing Jr.	Democratic	March 4, 1877 – March 4, 1879	12th	[data missing]
Thomas Ewing Jr.	Democratic	March 4, 1879 – March 4, 1881	10th	[data missing]
James J. Faran	Democratic	March 4, 1845 – March 4, 1849	1st	[data missing]
Edward F. Feighan	Democratic	January 3, 1983 – January 3, 1993	19th	[data missing]
Michael A. Feighan	Democratic	January 3, 1943 – January 3, 1971	20th	[data missing]
Lucien J. Fenton	Republican	March 4, 1895 – March 4, 1899	10th	[data missing]
Simeon D. Fess	Republican	March 4, 1913 – March 4, 1915	6th	[data missing]
Simeon D. Fess	Republican	March 4, 1915 – March 4, 1923	7th	[data missing]
William L. Fiesinger	Democratic	March 4, 1931 – January 3, 1937	13th	[data missing]
William E. Finck	Democratic	March 4, 1863 – March 4, 1867	12th	[data missing]
William E. Finck	Democratic	December 7, 1874 – March 4, 1875	12th	[data missing]
James Findlay	Jacksonian	March 4, 1825 – March 4, 1833	1st	[data missing]
Eric Fingerhut	Democratic	January 3, 1993 – January 3, 1995	19th	[data missing]
Ebenezer B. Finley	Democratic	March 4, 1877 – March 4, 1879	14th	[data missing]
Ebenezer B. Finley	Democratic	March 4, 1879 – March 4, 1881	8th	[data missing]
David Fisher	Whig	March 4, 1847 – March 4, 1849	2nd	[data missing]
Roy G. Fitzgerald	Republican	March 4, 1921 – March 4, 1931	3rd	[data missing]
William T. Fitzgerald	Republican	March 4, 1925 – March 4, 1929	4th	[data missing]
Anthony A. Fleger	Democratic	January 3, 1937 – January 3, 1939	22nd	[data missing]
Thomas B. Fletcher	Democratic	March 4, 1925 – March 4, 1929	8th	[data missing]
Thomas B. Fletcher	Democratic	March 4, 1933 – January 3, 1939	8th	[data missing]
Elias Florence	Whig	March 4, 1843 – March 4, 1845	9th	[data missing]
John Fassett Follett	Democratic	March 4, 1883 – March 4, 1885	1st	[data missing]
Martin A. Foran	Democratic	March 4, 1883 – March 4, 1889	21st	[data missing]
Israel M. Foster	Republican	March 4, 1919 – March 4, 1925	10th	[data missing]
Charles Foster	Republican	March 4, 1871 – March 4, 1873	9th	[data missing]
Charles Foster	Republican	March 4, 1873 – March 4, 1879	10th	[data missing]
William B. Francis	Democratic	March 4, 1911 – March 4, 1915	16th	[data missing]
George Fries	Democratic	March 4, 1845 – March 4, 1849	17th	[data missing]
Marcia Fudge	Democratic	November 18, 2008 – March 10, 2021	11th	Resigned to become United States Secretary of Housing and Urban Development.
Harry C. Gahn	Republican	March 4, 1921 – March 4, 1923	21st	[data missing]
Samuel Galloway	Anti-Nebraska	March 4, 1855 – March 4, 1857	12th	[data missing]
Martin K. Gantz	Democratic	March 4, 1891 – March 4, 1893	4th	[data missing]
Harvey C. Garber	Democratic	March 4, 1903 – March 4, 1907	4th	[data missing]
Warren Gard	Democratic	March 4, 1913 – March 4, 1921	3rd	[data missing]
Edward J. Gardner	Democratic	January 3, 1945 – January 3, 1947	3rd	[data missing]
Mills Gardner	Republican	March 4, 1877 – March 4, 1879	3rd	[data missing]
James A. Garfield	Republican	March 4, 1863 – November 8, 1880	19th	Resigned to become President of the United States.
James M. Gaylord	Democratic	March 4, 1851 – March 4, 1853	13th	[data missing]
James William Gazlay	Democratic-Republican	March 4, 1823 – March 4, 1825	1st	[data missing]
George W. Geddes	Democratic	March 4, 1879 – March 4, 1881	15th	[data missing]
George W. Geddes	Democratic	March 4, 1881 – March 4, 1885	14th	[data missing]
George W. Geddes	Democratic	March 4, 1885 – March 4, 1887	16th	[data missing]
Bob Gibbs	Republican	January 3, 2011 – January 3, 2013	18th	[data missing]
Bob Gibbs	Republican	January 3, 2013 – January 3, 2023	7th	Retired.
Joshua Giddings	Whig	December 3, 1838 – March 22, 1842	16th	Resigned
Joshua Giddings	Whig	December 5, 1842 – March 4, 1843	16th	[data missing]
Joshua Giddings	Whig	March 4, 1843 – March 4, 1849	20th	[data missing]
Joshua Giddings	Free Soil	March 4, 1849 – March 4, 1855	20th	[data missing]
Joshua Giddings	Anti-Nebraska	March 4, 1855 – March 4, 1857	20th	[data missing]
Joshua Giddings	Republican	March 4, 1857 – March 4, 1859	20th	[data missing]
Joseph J. Gill	Republican	December 4, 1899 – October 31, 1903	16th	Resigned
John J. Gilligan	Democratic	January 3, 1965 – January 3, 1967	1st	[data missing]
Paul Gillmor	Republican	January 3, 1989 – September 5, 2007	5th	Died
Herman P. Goebel	Republican	March 4, 1903 – March 4, 1911	2nd	[data missing]
J. Henry Goeke	Democratic	March 4, 1911 – March 4, 1915	4th	[data missing]
Anthony Gonzalez	Republican	January 3, 2019 – January 3, 2023	16th	Retired.
Patrick Gaines Goode	Whig	March 4, 1837 – March 4, 1843	3rd	[data missing]
John M. Goodenow	Jacksonian	March 4, 1829 – April 9, 1830	11th	Resigned after becoming judge of the Supreme Court of Ohio.
Robert B. Gordon	Democratic	March 4, 1899 – March 4, 1903	4th	[data missing]
William Gordon	Democratic	March 4, 1913 – March 4, 1919	20th	[data missing]
Bill Gradison	Republican	January 3, 1975 – January 3, 1983	1st	[data missing]
Bill Gradison	Republican	January 3, 1983 – January 31, 1993	2nd	Resigned
Frederick W. Green	Democratic	March 4, 1851 – March 4, 1853	6th	[data missing]
Frederick W. Green	Democratic	March 4, 1853 – March 4, 1855	9th	[data missing]
Percy W. Griffiths	Republican	January 3, 1943 – January 3, 1949	15th	[data missing]
William S. Groesbeck	Democratic	March 4, 1857 – March 4, 1859	2nd	[data missing]
Charles H. Grosvenor	Republican	March 4, 1885 – March 4, 1887	14th	[data missing]
Charles H. Grosvenor	Republican	March 4, 1887 – March 4, 1891	15th	[data missing]
Charles H. Grosvenor	Republican	March 4, 1893 – March 4, 1907	11th	[data missing]
Lewis B. Gunckel	Republican	March 4, 1873 – March 4, 1875	4th	[data missing]
John A. Gurley	Republican	March 4, 1859 – March 4, 1863	2nd	[data missing]
Tennyson Guyer	Republican	January 3, 1973 – April 12, 1981	4th	Died.
Lawrence W. Hall	Democratic	March 4, 1857 – March 4, 1859	9th	[data missing]
Tony P. Hall	Democratic	January 3, 1979 – September 9, 2002	3rd	Resigned after being appointed Ambassador to the Food and Agriculture Organization of the United Nations.
Thomas L. Hamer	Jacksonian	March 4, 1833 – March 4, 1837	5th	[data missing]
Thomas L. Hamer	Democratic	March 4, 1837 – March 4, 1839	5th	[data missing]
Cornelius S. Hamilton	Republican	March 4, 1867 – December 22, 1867	8th	Died.
Edward S. Hamlin	Whig	October 8, 1844 – March 4, 1845	21st	[data missing]
Peter Francis Hammond	Democratic	November 3, 1936 – January 3, 1937	11th	[data missing]
J. Eugene Harding	Republican	March 4, 1907 – March 4, 1909	3rd	[data missing]
Darius D. Hare	Democratic	March 4, 1891 – March 4, 1893	8th	[data missing]
Darius D. Hare	Democratic	March 4, 1893 – March 4, 1895	13th	[data missing]
Aaron Harlan	Whig	March 4, 1853 – March 4, 1855	7th	[data missing]
Aaron Harlan	Anti-Nebraska	March 4, 1855 – March 4, 1857	7th	[data missing]
Aaron Harlan	Republican	March 4, 1857 – March 4, 1859	7th	[data missing]
Byron B. Harlan	Democratic	March 4, 1931 – January 3, 1939	3rd	[data missing]
Alexander Harper	Whig	March 4, 1837 – March 4, 1839	12th	[data missing]
Alexander Harper	Whig	March 4, 1843 – March 4, 1847	14th	[data missing]
Alexander Harper	Whig	March 4, 1851 – March 4, 1853	14th	[data missing]
Stephen Ross Harris	Republican	March 4, 1895 – March 4, 1897	13th	[data missing]
John S. Harrison	Whig	March 4, 1853 – March 4, 1855	2nd	[data missing]
John S. Harrison	Anti-Nebraska	March 4, 1855 – March 4, 1857	2nd	[data missing]
Richard A. Harrison	Union	July 4, 1861 – March 4, 1863	7th	[data missing]
William Henry Harrison	Democratic-Republican	October 8, 1816 – March 4, 1819	1st	[data missing]
Bill Harsha	Republican	January 3, 1961 – January 3, 1981	6th	[data missing]
Alphonso Hart	Republican	March 4, 1883 – March 4, 1885	12th	[data missing]
Dow W. Harter	Democratic	March 4, 1933 – January 3, 1943	14th	[data missing]
Michael D. Harter	Democratic	March 4, 1891 – March 4, 1893	15th	[data missing]
Michael D. Harter	Democratic	March 4, 1893 – March 4, 1895	14th	[data missing]
John Hastings	Democratic	March 4, 1839 – March 4, 1843	17th	[data missing]
Rutherford B. Hayes	Republican	March 4, 1865 – July 20, 1867	2nd	Resigned to run for Governor.
William E. Haynes	Democratic	March 4, 1889 – March 4, 1891	10th	[data missing]
William E. Haynes	Democratic	March 4, 1891 – March 4, 1893	7th	[data missing]
Wayne Hays	Democratic	January 3, 1949 – September 1, 1976	18th	Resigned.
Victor Heintz	Republican	March 4, 1917 – March 4, 1919	2nd	[data missing]
William Helmick	Republican	March 4, 1859 – March 4, 1861	15th	[data missing]
John E. Henderson	Republican	January 3, 1955 – January 3, 1961	15th	[data missing]
Samuel Herrick	Democratic-Republican	March 4, 1817 – March 4, 1821	4th	[data missing]
William E. Hess	Republican	March 4, 1929 – January 3, 1937	2nd	[data missing]
William E. Hess	Republican	January 3, 1939 – January 3, 1949	2nd	[data missing]
William E. Hess	Republican	January 3, 1951 – January 3, 1961	2nd	[data missing]
Charles Q. Hildebrant	Republican	March 4, 1901 – March 4, 1905	6th	[data missing]
William D. Hill	Democratic	March 4, 1879 – March 4, 1881	6th	[data missing]
William D. Hill	Democratic	March 4, 1883 – March 4, 1887	6th	[data missing]
Joseph H. Himes	Republican	March 4, 1921 – March 4, 1923	16th	[data missing]
Peter Hitchcock	Democratic-Republican	March 4, 1817 – March 4, 1819	6th	[data missing]
Truman H. Hoag	Democratic	March 4, 1869 – February 5, 1870	10th	Died
Moses Hoagland	Democratic	March 4, 1849 – March 4, 1851	16th	[data missing]
Dave Hobson	Republican	January 3, 1991 – January 3, 2009	7th	[data missing]
Martin R. Hoke	Republican	January 3, 1993 – January 3, 1997	10th	[data missing]
Greg J. Holbrock	Democratic	January 3, 1941 – January 3, 1943	3rd	[data missing]
David Hollingsworth	Republican	March 4, 1909 – March 4, 1911	16th	[data missing]
David Hollingsworth	Republican	March 4, 1915 – March 4, 1919	18th	[data missing]
John B. Hollister	Republican	November 3, 1931 – January 3, 1937	1st	[data missing]
Valentine B. Horton	Anti-Nebraska	March 4, 1855 – March 4, 1857	11th	[data missing]
Valentine B. Horton	Republican	March 4, 1857 – March 4, 1859	11th	[data missing]
Valentine B. Horton	Republican	March 4, 1861 – March 4, 1863	11th	[data missing]
George W. Houk	Democratic	March 4, 1891 – February 9, 1894	3rd	Died
William Howard	Democratic	March 4, 1859 – March 4, 1861	6th	[data missing]
Elias Howell	Anti-Jacksonian	March 4, 1835 – March 4, 1837	12th	[data missing]
L. Paul Howland	Republican	March 4, 1907 – March 4, 1913	20th	[data missing]
James R. Hubbell	Republican	March 4, 1865 – March 4, 1867	8th	[data missing]
Walter B. Huber	Democratic	January 3, 1945 – January 3, 1951	14th	[data missing]
George W. Hulick	Republican	March 4, 1893 – March 4, 1897	6th	[data missing]
John F. Hunter	Democratic	January 3, 1937 – January 3, 1943	9th	[data missing]
William F. Hunter	Whig	March 4, 1849 – March 4, 1853	15th	[data missing]
William H. Hunter	Democratic	March 4, 1837 – March 4, 1839	14th	[data missing]
Frank H. Hurd	Democratic	March 4, 1875 – March 4, 1877	6th	[data missing]
Frank H. Hurd	Democratic	March 4, 1879 – March 4, 1881	7th	[data missing]
Frank H. Hurd	Democratic	March 4, 1883 – March 4, 1885	10th	[data missing]
John Hutchins	Republican	March 4, 1859 – March 4, 1863	20th	[data missing]
Wells A. Hutchins	Democratic	March 4, 1863 – March 4, 1865	11th	[data missing]
George P. Ikirt	Democratic	March 4, 1893 – March 4, 1895	18th	[data missing]
Lawrence E. Imhoff	Democratic	March 4, 1933 – January 3, 1939	18th	[data missing]
Lawrence E. Imhoff	Democratic	January 3, 1941 – January 3, 1943	18th	[data missing]
William W. Irvin	Jacksonian	March 4, 1829 – March 4, 1833	9th	[data missing]
Amos H. Jackson	Republican	March 4, 1903 – March 4, 1905	13th	[data missing]
Harry P. Jeffrey	Republican	January 3, 1943 – January 3, 1945	3rd	[data missing]
Thomas A. Jenkins	Republican	March 4, 1925 – January 3, 1959	10th	[data missing]
David Jennings	Anti-Jacksonian	March 4, 1825 – May 25, 1826	10th	Resigned
Hugh J. Jewett	Democratic	March 4, 1873 – June 23, 1874	12th	Resigned to become President of the Erie Railroad.
Adna R. Johnson	Republican	March 4, 1909 – March 4, 1911	10th	[data missing]
Bill Johnson	Republican	January 3, 2011 – January 21, 2024	6th	Resigned to become president of Youngstown State University.
Harvey H. Johnson	Democratic	March 4, 1853 – March 4, 1855	14th	[data missing]
John Johnson	Democratic-Republican	March 4, 1851 – March 4, 1853	16th	[data missing]
Perley B. Johnson	Whig	March 4, 1843 – March 4, 1845	13th	[data missing]
Tom L. Johnson	Democratic	March 4, 1891 – March 4, 1895	21st	[data missing]
William Johnston	Democratic	March 4, 1863 – March 4, 1865	8th	[data missing]
Benjamin Jones	Jacksonian	March 4, 1833 – March 4, 1837	18th	[data missing]
John S. Jones	Republican	March 4, 1877 – March 4, 1879	9th	[data missing]
Robert Franklin Jones	Republican	January 3, 1939 – September 2, 1947	4th	Resigned after being appointed a member of the Federal Communications Commission.
Stephanie Tubbs Jones	Democratic	January 3, 1999 – August 20, 2008	11th	Died
Isaac M. Jordan	Democratic	March 4, 1883 – March 4, 1885	2nd	[data missing]
Jim Jordan	Republican	January 3, 2007 – present	4th	Incumbent
David Joyce	Republican	January 3, 2013 – present	14th	Incumbent
James Joyce	Republican	March 4, 1909 – March 4, 1911	15th	[data missing]
Marcy Kaptur	Democratic	January 3, 1983 – present	9th	Incumbent
John Kasich	Republican	January 3, 1983 – January 3, 2001	12th	[data missing]
Charles C. Kearns	Republican	March 4, 1915 – March 4, 1931	6th	[data missing]
William J. Keating	Republican	January 3, 1971 – January 3, 1974	1st	Resigned
J. Warren Keifer	Republican	March 4, 1877 – March 4, 1879	8th	[data missing]
J. Warren Keifer	Republican	March 4, 1879 – March 4, 1881	4th	[data missing]
J. Warren Keifer	Republican	March 4, 1881 – March 4, 1885	8th	[data missing]
J. Warren Keifer	Republican	March 4, 1905 – March 4, 1911	7th	[data missing]
James Kennedy	Republican	March 4, 1903 – March 4, 1911	18th	[data missing]
Robert P. Kennedy	Republican	March 4, 1887 – March 4, 1891	8th	[data missing]
William Kennon Jr.	Democratic	March 4, 1847 – March 4, 1849	15th	[data missing]
William Kennon Sr.	Jacksonian	March 4, 1829 – March 4, 1833	10th	[data missing]
William Kennon Sr.	Jacksonian	March 4, 1835 – March 4, 1837	11th	[data missing]
Winfield S. Kerr	Republican	March 4, 1895 – March 4, 1901	14th	[data missing]
John A. Key	Democratic	March 4, 1913 – March 4, 1915	13th	[data missing]
John A. Key	Democratic	March 4, 1915 – March 4, 1919	8th	[data missing]
James Kilbourne	Democratic-Republican	March 4, 1813 – March 4, 1817	5th	[data missing]
Daniel Kilgore	Jacksonian	December 1, 1834 – March 4, 1837	19th	[data missing]
Daniel Kilgore	Democratic	March 4, 1837 – July 4, 1838	19th	Resigned
Mary Jo Kilroy	Democratic	January 3, 2009 – January 3, 2011	15th	[data missing]
Tom Kindness	Republican	January 3, 1975 – January 3, 1987	8th	[data missing]
Michael J. Kirwan	Democratic	January 3, 1937 – July 27, 1970	19th	Died
Frank L. Kloeb	Democratic	March 4, 1933 – August 19, 1937	4th	Resigned after being appointed judge of the U.S. District Court for the Northern District of Ohio
Frank C. Kniffin	Democratic	March 4, 1931 – January 3, 1939	5th	[data missing]
Charles L. Knight	Republican	March 4, 1921 – March 4, 1923	14th	[data missing]
Dennis Kucinich	Democratic	January 3, 1997 – January 3, 2013	10th	[data missing]
Thomas B. Kyle	Republican	March 4, 1901 – March 4, 1905	7th	[data missing]
Samuel Lahm	Democratic	March 4, 1847 – March 4, 1849	18th	[data missing]
Charles Nelson Lamison	Democratic	March 4, 1871 – March 4, 1875	5th	[data missing]
Arthur P. Lamneck	Democratic	March 4, 1931 – January 3, 1939	12th	[data missing]
Greg Landsman	Democratic	January 3, 2023 – present	1st	Incumbent
J. Ford Laning	Republican	March 4, 1907 – March 4, 1909	14th	[data missing]
Steve LaTourette	Republican	January 3, 1995 – January 3, 2003	19th	[data missing]
Steve LaTourette	Republican	January 3, 2003 – January 3, 2013	14th	[data missing]
Bob Latta	Republican	December 11, 2007 – present	5th	Incumbent
Del Latta	Republican	January 3, 1959 – January 3, 1989	5th	[data missing]
William Lawrence	Democratic	March 4, 1857 – March 4, 1859	17th	[data missing]
William Lawrence	Republican	March 4, 1865 – March 4, 1871	4th	[data missing]
William Lawrence	Republican	March 4, 1873 – March 4, 1877	8th	[data missing]
Fernando C. Layton	Democratic	March 4, 1891 – March 4, 1893	5th	[data missing]
Fernando C. Layton	Democratic	March 4, 1893 – March 4, 1897	4th	[data missing]
Daniel P. Leadbetter	Democratic	March 4, 1837 – March 4, 1841	13th	[data missing]
Humphrey H. Leavitt	Jacksonian	December 6, 1830 – March 4, 1833	11th	[data missing]
Humphrey H. Leavitt	Jacksonian	March 4, 1833 – July 10, 1834	19th	Resigned to become a judge for the U.S. District Court for the District of Ohio
Francis Celeste LeBlond	Democratic	March 4, 1863 – March 4, 1867	5th	[data missing]
John P. Leedom	Democratic	March 4, 1881 – March 4, 1883	7th	[data missing]
Benjamin Le Fevre	Democratic	March 4, 1879 – March 4, 1883	5th	[data missing]
Benjamin Le Fevre	Democratic	March 4, 1883 – March 4, 1885	4th	[data missing]
Benjamin Le Fevre	Democratic	March 4, 1885 – March 4, 1887	5th	[data missing]
Benjamin Franklin Leiter	Anti-Nebraska	March 4, 1855 – March 4, 1857	18th	[data missing]
Benjamin Franklin Leiter	Republican	March 4, 1857 – March 4, 1859	18th	[data missing]
John J. Lentz	Democratic	March 4, 1897 – March 4, 1901	12th	[data missing]
Robert W. Levering	Democratic	January 3, 1959 – January 3, 1961	17th	[data missing]
Earl R. Lewis	Republican	January 3, 1939 – January 3, 1941	18th	[data missing]
Earl R. Lewis	Republican	January 3, 1943 – January 3, 1949	18th	[data missing]
William D. Lindsley	Democratic	March 4, 1853 – March 4, 1855	13th	[data missing]
John Little	Republican	March 4, 1885 – March 4, 1887	8th	[data missing]
Alexander Long	Democratic	March 4, 1863 – March 4, 1865	2nd	[data missing]
Nicholas Longworth	Republican	March 4, 1903 – March 4, 1913	1st	[data missing]
Nicholas Longworth	Republican	March 4, 1915 – April 9, 1931	1st	Died
Andrew W. Loomis	Whig	March 4, 1837 – October 20, 1837	17th	Resigned
Rodney M. Love	Democratic	January 3, 1965 – January 3, 1967	3rd	[data missing]
Charlie Luken	Democratic	January 3, 1991 – January 3, 1993	1st	[data missing]
Tom Luken	Democratic	March 5, 1974 – January 3, 1975	1st	[data missing]
Tom Luken	Democratic	January 3, 1977 – January 3, 1983	2nd	[data missing]
Tom Luken	Democratic	January 3, 1983 – January 3, 1991	1st	[data missing]
Donald Buz Lukens	Republican	January 3, 1967 – January 3, 1971	24th	[data missing]
Donald Buz Lukens	Republican	January 3, 1987 – October 24, 1990	8th	Resigned
Archibald Lybrand	Republican	March 4, 1897 – March 4, 1901	8th	[data missing]
Robert Todd Lytle	Jacksonian	March 4, 1833 – March 4, 1835	1st	resigned March 10, 1834, and re-elected to seat December 27
David S. Mann	Democratic	January 3, 1993 – January 3, 1995	1st	[data missing]
George A. Marshall	Democratic	March 4, 1897 – March 4, 1899	4th	[data missing]
L. L. Marshall	Republican	January 3, 1939 – January 3, 1941	At-large	[data missing]
Leroy T. Marshall	Republican	March 4, 1933 – January 3, 1937	7th	[data missing]
Charles D. Martin	Democratic	March 4, 1859 – March 4, 1861	11th	[data missing]
Samson Mason	Anti-Jacksonian	March 4, 1835 – March 4, 1837	10th	[data missing]
Samson Mason	Whig	March 4, 1837 – March 4, 1843	10th	[data missing]
James Mathews	Democratic	March 4, 1841 – March 4, 1843	13th	[data missing]
James Mathews	Democratic	March 4, 1843 – March 4, 1845	16th	[data missing]
Joshua Mathiot	Whig	March 4, 1841 – March 4, 1843	12th	[data missing]
Nelson Edwin Matthews	Republican	March 4, 1915 – March 4, 1917	5th	[data missing]
Duncan McArthur	Democratic-Republican	March 4, 1823 – March 4, 1825	6th	[data missing]
William C. McCauslen	Democratic	March 4, 1843 – March 4, 1845	17th	[data missing]
Charles B. McClintock	Republican	March 4, 1929 – March 4, 1933	16th	[data missing]
Addison S. McClure	Republican	March 4, 1881 – March 4, 1883	18th	[data missing]
Addison S. McClure	Republican	March 4, 1895 – March 4, 1897	17th	[data missing]
John W. McCormick	Republican	March 4, 1883 – March 4, 1885	11th	[data missing]
Edward O. McCowen	Republican	January 3, 1943 – January 3, 1949	6th	[data missing]
Roscoe C. McCulloch	Republican	March 4, 1915 – March 4, 1921	16th	[data missing]
William M. McCulloch	Republican	November 4, 1947 – January 3, 1973	4th	[data missing]
John A. McDowell	Democratic	March 4, 1897 – March 4, 1901	17th	[data missing]
Joseph J. McDowell	Democratic	March 4, 1843 – March 4, 1847	7th	[data missing]
Bob McEwen	Republican	January 3, 1981 – January 3, 1993	6th	[data missing]
J. Harry McGregor	Republican	February 27, 1940 – October 7, 1958	17th	Died
William McKinley	Republican	March 4, 1877 – March 4, 1879	17th	[data missing]
William McKinley	Republican	March 4, 1879 – March 4, 1881	16th	[data missing]
William McKinley	Republican	March 4, 1881 – March 4, 1883	17th	[data missing]
William McKinley	Republican	March 4, 1883 – May 27, 1884	18th	Lost contested election
William McKinley	Republican	March 4, 1885 – March 4, 1887	20th	[data missing]
William McKinley	Republican	March 4, 1887 – March 4, 1891	18th	[data missing]
John F. McKinney	Democratic	March 4, 1863 – March 4, 1865	4th	[data missing]
John F. McKinney	Democratic	March 4, 1871 – March 4, 1873	4th	[data missing]
John McLean	Democratic-Republican	March 4, 1813 – ??, 1816	1st	Resigned after becoming associate justice of the Supreme Court of Ohio
William McLean	Democratic-Republican	March 4, 1823 – March 4, 1825	3rd	[data missing]
William McLean	Anti-Jacksonian	March 4, 1825 – March 4, 1829	3rd	[data missing]
Jeremiah McLene	Jacksonian	March 4, 1833 – March 4, 1837	8th	[data missing]
John A. McMahon	Democratic	March 4, 1875 – March 4, 1879	4th	[data missing]
John A. McMahon	Democratic	March 4, 1879 – March 4, 1881	3rd	[data missing]
John McSweeney	Democratic	March 4, 1923 – March 4, 1929	16th	[data missing]
John McSweeney	Democratic	January 3, 1937 – January 3, 1939	At-large	[data missing]
John McSweeney	Democratic	January 3, 1949 – January 3, 1951	16th	[data missing]
William Medill	Democratic	March 4, 1839 – March 4, 1843	9th	[data missing]
David Meekison	Democratic	March 4, 1897 – March 4, 1901	5th	[data missing]
Clarence E. Miller	Republican	January 3, 1967 – January 3, 1993	10th	[data missing]
John K. Miller	Democratic	March 4, 1847 – March 4, 1851	11th	[data missing]
Joseph Miller	Democratic	March 4, 1857 – March 4, 1859	10th	[data missing]
Max Miller	Republican	January 3, 2023 – present	7th	Incumbent
Ward Miller	Republican	November 8, 1960 – January 3, 1961	6th	[data missing]
William E. Minshall Jr.	Republican	January 3, 1955 – December 31, 1974	23rd	Resigned
Robert Mitchell	Jacksonian	March 4, 1833 – 1835	12th	[data missing]
Walter H. Moeller	Democratic	January 3, 1959 – January 3, 1963	10th	[data missing]
Walter H. Moeller	Democratic	January 3, 1965 – January 3, 1967	10th	[data missing]
James Monroe	Republican	March 4, 1871 – March 4, 1873	14th	[data missing]
James Monroe	Republican	March 4, 1873 – March 4, 1879	18th	[data missing]
James Monroe	Republican	March 4, 1879 – March 4, 1881	17th	[data missing]
William C. Mooney	Republican	March 4, 1915 – March 4, 1917	15th	[data missing]
Charles A. Mooney	Democratic	March 4, 1919 – March 4, 1921	20th	[data missing]
Charles A. Mooney	Democratic	March 4, 1923 – May 29, 1931	20th	Died
C. Ellis Moore	Republican	March 4, 1919 – March 4, 1933	15th	[data missing]
Eliakim H. Moore	Republican	March 4, 1869 – March 4, 1871	15th	[data missing]
Heman A. Moore	Democratic	March 4, 1843 – April 3, 1844	10th	Died
Oscar F. Moore	Anti-Nebraska	March 4, 1855 – March 4, 1857	10th	[data missing]
Tom V. Moorehead	Republican	January 3, 1961 – January 3, 1963	15th	[data missing]
Henry Lee Morey	Republican	March 4, 1881 – March 4, 1883	3rd	[data missing]
Henry Lee Morey	Republican	March 4, 1883 – June 20, 1884	7th	Lost contested election
Henry Lee Morey	Republican	March 4, 1889 – March 4, 1891	7th	[data missing]
Stephen Morgan	Republican	March 4, 1899 – March 4, 1905	10th	[data missing]
William M. Morgan	Republican	March 4, 1921 – March 4, 1931	17th	[data missing]
George W. Morgan	Democratic	March 4, 1867 – June 3, 1868	13th	Lost contested election
George W. Morgan	Democratic	March 4, 1869 – March 4, 1873	13th	[data missing]
Calvary Morris	Whig	March 4, 1837 – March 4, 1843	6th	[data missing]
James R. Morris	Democratic	March 4, 1861 – March 4, 1863	17th	[data missing]
James R. Morris	Democratic	March 4, 1863 – March 4, 1865	15th	[data missing]
Jonathan D. Morris	Democratic	March 4, 1847 – March 4, 1851	7th	[data missing]
Joseph Morris	Democratic	March 4, 1843 – March 4, 1847	15th	[data missing]
Jeremiah Morrow	Democratic-Republican	October 17, 1803 – March 4, 1813	At-large	[data missing]
Jeremiah Morrow	Whig	October 13, 1840 – March 4, 1843	4th	[data missing]
Charles A. Mosher	Republican	January 3, 1961 – January 3, 1977	13th	[data missing]
Harold G. Mosier	Democratic	January 3, 1937 – January 3, 1939	At-large	[data missing]
Richard Mott	Anti-Nebraska	March 4, 1855 – March 4, 1857	5th	[data missing]
Richard Mott	Republican	March 4, 1857 – March 4, 1859	5th	[data missing]
Ronald M. Mottl	Democratic	January 3, 1975 – January 3, 1983	23rd	[data missing]
Grant E. Mouser Jr.	Republican	March 4, 1929 – March 4, 1933	8th	[data missing]
Grant E. Mouser	Republican	March 4, 1905 – March 4, 1909	13th	[data missing]
Francis Swaine Muhlenberg	Anti-Jacksonian	December 19, 1828 – March 4, 1829	6th	[data missing]
William Mungen	Democratic	March 4, 1867 – March 4, 1871	5th	[data missing]
B. Frank Murphy	Republican	March 4, 1919 – March 4, 1933	18th	[data missing]
Robert Maynard Murray	Democratic	March 4, 1883 – March 4, 1885	3rd	[data missing]
Henry S. Neal	Republican	March 4, 1877 – March 4, 1879	11th	[data missing]
Henry S. Neal	Republican	March 4, 1879 – March 4, 1881	12th	[data missing]
Henry S. Neal	Republican	March 4, 1881 – March 4, 1883	11th	[data missing]
Lawrence T. Neal	Democratic	March 4, 1873 – March 4, 1877	7th	[data missing]
Robert M. Nevin	Republican	March 4, 1901 – March 4, 1907	3rd	[data missing]
Eben Newton	Whig	March 4, 1851 – March 4, 1853	19th	[data missing]
Bob Ney	Republican	January 3, 1995 – November 3, 2006	18th	Resigned
Matthias H. Nichols	Democratic	March 4, 1853 – March 4, 1855	4th	[data missing]
Matthias H. Nichols	Anti-Nebraska	March 4, 1855 – March 4, 1857	4th	[data missing]
Matthias H. Nichols	Republican	March 4, 1857 – March 4, 1859	4th	[data missing]
Warren P. Noble	Democratic	March 4, 1861 – March 4, 1865	9th	[data missing]
Stephen A. Northway	Republican	March 4, 1893 – September 8, 1898	19th	Died
James A. Norton	Democratic	March 4, 1897 – March 4, 1903	13th	[data missing]
Miner Gibbs Norton	Republican	March 4, 1921 – March 4, 1923	20th	[data missing]
Robert H. Nugen	Democratic	March 4, 1861 – March 4, 1863	15th	[data missing]
John O'Neill	Democratic	March 4, 1863 – March 4, 1865	13th	[data missing]
Mary Rose Oakar	Democratic	January 3, 1977 – January 3, 1993	20th	[data missing]
Lewis P. Ohliger	Democratic	December 5, 1892 – March 4, 1893	16th	[data missing]
Edson B. Olds	Democratic	March 4, 1849 – March 4, 1853	9th	[data missing]
Edson B. Olds	Democratic	March 4, 1853 – March 4, 1855	12th	[data missing]
Joseph H. Outhwaite	Democratic	March 4, 1885 – March 4, 1891	13th	[data missing]
Joseph H. Outhwaite	Democratic	March 4, 1891 – March 4, 1893	9th	[data missing]
Joseph H. Outhwaite	Democratic	March 4, 1893 – March 4, 1895	12th	[data missing]
Arthur W. Overmyer	Democratic	March 4, 1915 – March 4, 1919	13th	[data missing]
James W. Owens	Democratic	March 4, 1889 – March 4, 1891	16th	[data missing]
James W. Owens	Democratic	March 4, 1891 – March 4, 1893	14th	[data missing]
Mike Oxley	Republican	June 25, 1981 – January 3, 2007	4th	[data missing]
David Raymond Paige	Democratic	March 4, 1883 – March 4, 1885	20th	[data missing]
Isaac Parrish	Democratic	March 4, 1839 – March 4, 1841	11th	[data missing]
Isaac Parrish	Democratic	March 4, 1845 – March 4, 1847	13th	[data missing]
Richard Chappel Parsons	Republican	March 4, 1873 – March 4, 1875	20th	[data missing]
John Patterson	Democratic-Republican	March 4, 1823 – March 4, 1825	10th	[data missing]
William Patterson	Jacksonian	March 4, 1833 – March 4, 1837	14th	[data missing]
John M. Pattison	Democratic	March 4, 1891 – March 4, 1893	11th	[data missing]
Henry B. Payne	Democratic	March 4, 1875 – March 4, 1877	20th	[data missing]
Albert J. Pearson	Democratic	March 4, 1891 – March 4, 1893	17th	[data missing]
Albert J. Pearson	Democratic	March 4, 1893 – March 4, 1895	16th	[data missing]
Don Pease	Democratic	January 3, 1977 – January 3, 1993	13th	[data missing]
Erasmus D. Peck	Republican	April 23, 1870 – March 4, 1873	10th	[data missing]
George H. Pendleton	Democratic	March 4, 1857 – March 4, 1865	1st	[data missing]
Nathanael Greene Pendleton	Whig	March 4, 1841 – March 4, 1843	1st	[data missing]
Augustus L. Perrill	Democratic	March 4, 1845 – March 4, 1847	9th	[data missing]
Aaron Fyfe Perry	Republican	March 4, 1871 – ??, 1872	1st	Resigned
Fremont Orestes Phillips	Republican	March 4, 1899 – March 4, 1901	20th	[data missing]
Tobias A. Plants	Republican	March 4, 1865 – March 4, 1869	15th	[data missing]
James G. Polk	Democratic	March 4, 1931 – January 3, 1941	6th	[data missing]
James G. Polk	Democratic	January 3, 1949 – April 28, 1959	6th	Died
Earley F. Poppleton	Democratic	March 4, 1875 – March 4, 1877	9th	[data missing]
Rob Portman	Republican	May 4, 1993 – April 29, 2005	2nd	Resigned after being appointed U.S. Trade Representative
James D. Post	Democratic	March 4, 1911 – March 4, 1915	7th	[data missing]
Emery D. Potter	Democratic	March 4, 1843 – March 4, 1845	5th	[data missing]
Emery D. Potter	Democratic	March 4, 1849 – March 4, 1851	5th	[data missing]
Walter E. Powell	Republican	January 3, 1971 – January 3, 1973	24th	[data missing]
Walter E. Powell	Republican	January 3, 1973 – January 3, 1975	8th	[data missing]
Deborah Pryce	Republican	January 3, 1993 – January 3, 2009	15th	[data missing]
Jacob J. Pugsley	Republican	March 4, 1887 – March 4, 1891	12th	[data missing]
Homer A. Ramey	Republican	January 3, 1943 – January 3, 1949	9th	[data missing]
Frazier Reams	Independent	January 3, 1951 – January 3, 1955	9th	[data missing]
Ralph Regula	Republican	January 3, 1973 – January 3, 2009	16th	[data missing]
Jim Renacci	Republican	January 3, 2011 – January 3, 2019	16th	[data missing]
Americus Vespucius Rice	Democratic	March 4, 1875 – March 4, 1879	5th	[data missing]
John B. Rice	Republican	March 4, 1881 – March 4, 1883	10th	[data missing]
Carl W. Rich	Republican	January 3, 1963 – January 3, 1965	1st	[data missing]
James A. D. Richards	Democratic	March 4, 1893 – March 4, 1895	17th	[data missing]
Edwin D. Ricketts	Republican	March 4, 1915 – March 4, 1917	11th	[data missing]
Edwin D. Ricketts	Republican	March 4, 1919 – March 4, 1923	11th	[data missing]
Albert Gallatin Riddle	Republican	March 4, 1861 – March 4, 1863	19th	[data missing]
Joseph Ridgway	Whig	March 4, 1837 – March 4, 1843	8th	[data missing]
Thomas Ritchey	Democratic	March 4, 1847 – March 4, 1849	13th	[data missing]
Thomas Ritchey	Democratic	March 4, 1853 – March 4, 1855	11th	[data missing]
Byron F. Ritchie	Democratic	March 4, 1893 – March 4, 1895	9th	[data missing]
James M. Ritchie	Republican	March 4, 1881 – March 4, 1883	6th	[data missing]
James S. Robinson	Republican	March 4, 1881 – January 12, 1885	9th	Resigned to become Ohio Secretary of State
James W. Robinson	Republican	March 4, 1873 – March 4, 1875	9th	[data missing]
Jacob Romeis	Republican	March 4, 1885 – March 4, 1889	10th	[data missing]
Joseph M. Root	Whig	March 4, 1845 – March 4, 1849	21st	[data missing]
Joseph M. Root	Free Soil	March 4, 1849 – March 4, 1851	21st	[data missing]
Thomas R. Ross	Democratic-Republican	March 4, 1819 – March 4, 1823	1st	[data missing]
Thomas R. Ross	Democratic-Republican	March 4, 1823 – March 4, 1825	2nd	[data missing]
Harry N. Routzohn	Republican	January 3, 1939 – January 3, 1941	3rd	[data missing]
Edmund Rowe	Republican	January 3, 1943 – January 3, 1945	14th	[data missing]
Michael Rulli	Republican	June 11, 2024 – present	6th	Incumbent, elected to finish Bill Johnson's term
J. Edward Russell	Republican	March 4, 1915 – March 4, 1917	4th	[data missing]
William Russell	Jacksonian	March 4, 1827 – March 4, 1833	5th	[data missing]
William Russell	Whig	March 4, 1841 – March 4, 1843	7th	[data missing]
Tim Ryan	Democratic	January 3, 2003 – January 3, 2013	17th	[data missing]
Tim Ryan	Democratic	January 3, 2013 – January 3, 2023	13th	Retired to run for U.S. senator.
Henry St. John	Democratic	March 4, 1843 – March 4, 1847	6th	[data missing]
William R. Sapp	Whig	March 4, 1853 – March 4, 1855	15th	[data missing]
William R. Sapp	Anti-Nebraska	March 4, 1855 – March 4, 1857	15th	[data missing]
John S. Savage	Democratic	March 4, 1875 – March 4, 1877	3rd	[data missing]
Thomas C. Sawyer	Democratic	January 3, 1987 – January 3, 2003	14th	[data missing]
William Sawyer	Democratic	March 4, 1845 – March 4, 1849	5th	[data missing]
Milton Sayler	Democratic	March 4, 1873 – March 4, 1879	1st	[data missing]
Paul F. Schenck	Republican	November 6, 1951 – January 3, 1965	3rd	[data missing]
Robert C. Schenck	Whig	March 4, 1843 – March 4, 1851	3rd	[data missing]
Robert C. Schenck	Republican	March 4, 1863 – January 5, 1871	3rd	Resigned to become Minister to Great Britain
Gordon H. Scherer	Republican	January 3, 1953 – January 3, 1963	1st	[data missing]
Jean Schmidt	Republican	August 2, 2005 – January 3, 2013	2nd	[data missing]
Thomas E. Scroggy	Republican	March 4, 1905 – March 4, 1907	6th	[data missing]
James Seccombe	Republican	January 3, 1939 – January 3, 1941	16th	[data missing]
Robert T. Secrest	Democratic	March 4, 1933 – August 3, 1942	15th	Resigned to enter the United States Navy
Robert T. Secrest	Democratic	January 3, 1949 – September 26, 1954	15th	Resigned to become a member of the Federal Trade Commission
Robert T. Secrest	Democratic	January 3, 1963 – December 30, 1966	15th	Resigned
Francis Seiberling	Republican	March 4, 1929 – March 4, 1933	14th	[data missing]
John F. Seiberling Jr.	Democratic	January 3, 1971 – January 3, 1987	14th	[data missing]
George E. Seney	Democratic	March 4, 1883 – March 4, 1885	5th	[data missing]
George E. Seney	Democratic	March 4, 1885 – March 4, 1887	7th	[data missing]
George E. Seney	Democratic	March 4, 1887 – March 4, 1891	5th	[data missing]
Bob Shamansky	Democratic	January 3, 1981 – January 3, 1983	12th	[data missing]
Thomas Shannon	Anti-Jacksonian	December 4, 1826 – March 4, 1827	10th	[data missing]
Wilson Shannon	Democratic	March 4, 1853 – March 4, 1855	17th	[data missing]
William G. Sharp	Democratic	March 4, 1909 – July 23, 1914	14th	Resigned to become U.S. Ambassador to France
William Bunn Shattuc	Republican	March 4, 1897 – March 4, 1903	1st	[data missing]
Samuel Shellabarger	Republican	March 4, 1861 – March 4, 1863	8th	[data missing]
Samuel Shellabarger	Republican	March 4, 1865 – March 4, 1869	7th	[data missing]
Samuel Shellabarger	Republican	March 4, 1871 – March 4, 1873	7th	[data missing]
Matthias Shepler	Democratic	March 4, 1837 – March 4, 1839	18th	[data missing]
John Sherman	Anti-Nebraska	March 4, 1855 – March 4, 1857	13th	[data missing]
John Sherman	Republican	March 4, 1857 – March 4, 1861	13th	[data missing]
Isaac R. Sherwood	Republican	March 4, 1873 – March 4, 1875	6th	[data missing]
Isaac R. Sherwood	Democratic	March 4, 1907 – March 4, 1921	9th	[data missing]
Isaac R. Sherwood	Democratic	March 4, 1923 – March 4, 1925	9th	[data missing]
James Shields	Jacksonian	March 4, 1829 – March 4, 1831	2nd	[data missing]
Emanuel Shultz	Republican	March 4, 1881 – March 4, 1883	4th	[data missing]
William W. Skiles	Republican	March 4, 1901 – January 9, 1904	14th	Died
Jonathan Sloane	Anti-Masonic	March 4, 1833 – March 4, 1837	15th	[data missing]
John Sloane	Democratic-Republican	March 4, 1819 – March 4, 1823	6th	[data missing]
John Sloane	Democratic-Republican	March 4, 1823 – March 4, 1825	12th	[data missing]
John Sloane	Anti-Jacksonian	March 4, 1825 – March 4, 1829	12th	[data missing]
Frederick C. Smith	Republican	January 3, 1939 – January 3, 1951	8th	[data missing]
John Armstrong Smith	Republican	March 4, 1869 – March 4, 1873	6th	[data missing]
John Quincy Smith	Republican	March 4, 1873 – March 4, 1875	3rd	[data missing]
Martin L. Smyser	Republican	March 4, 1889 – March 4, 1891	20th	[data missing]
Martin L. Smyser	Republican	March 4, 1905 – March 4, 1907	17th	[data missing]
John Stout Snook	Democratic	March 4, 1901 – March 4, 1905	5th	[data missing]
John Stout Snook	Democratic	March 4, 1917 – March 4, 1919	5th	[data missing]
Paul J. Sorg	Democratic	May 21, 1894 – March 4, 1897	3rd	[data missing]
James H. Southard	Republican	March 4, 1895 – March 4, 1907	9th	[data missing]
Milton I. Southard	Democratic	March 4, 1873 – March 4, 1879	13th	[data missing]
Zack Space	Democratic	January 3, 2007 – January 3, 2011	18th	[data missing]
Rufus Paine Spalding	Republican	March 4, 1863 – March 4, 1869	18th	[data missing]
David Spangler	Anti-Jacksonian	March 4, 1833 – March 4, 1837	13th	[data missing]
John C. Speaks	Republican	March 4, 1921 – March 4, 1931	12th	[data missing]
Cyrus Spink	Republican	March 4, 1859 – May 31, 1859	14th	Died
William P. Sprague	Republican	March 4, 1871 – March 4, 1875	15th	[data missing]
William Stanbery	Jacksonian	October 9, 1827 – March 4, 1831	8th	[data missing]
William Stanbery	Anti-Jacksonian	March 4, 1831 – March 4, 1833	8th	[data missing]
J. William Stanton	Republican	January 3, 1965 – January 3, 1983	11th	[data missing]
James V. Stanton	Democratic	January 3, 1971 – January 3, 1977	20th	[data missing]
Benjamin Stanton	Whig	March 4, 1851 – March 4, 1853	4th	[data missing]
Benjamin Stanton	Anti-Nebraska	March 4, 1855 – March 4, 1857	8th	[data missing]
Benjamin Stanton	Republican	March 4, 1857 – March 4, 1861	8th	[data missing]
David A. Starkweather	Democratic	March 4, 1839 – March 4, 1841	18th	[data missing]
David A. Starkweather	Democratic	March 4, 1845 – March 4, 1847	18th	[data missing]
Ambrose E. B. Stephens	Republican	March 4, 1919 – February 12, 1927	2nd	Died
Job E. Stevenson	Republican	March 4, 1869 – March 4, 1873	2nd	[data missing]
Steve Stivers	Republican	January 3, 2011 – May 16, 2021	15th	Resigned to become the president and CEO of the Ohio Chamber of Commerce.
Samuel Stokely	Whig	March 4, 1841 – March 4, 1843	19th	[data missing]
Louis Stokes	Democratic	January 3, 1969 – January 3, 1993	21st	[data missing]
Louis Stokes	Democratic	January 3, 1993 – January 3, 1999	11th	[data missing]
Alfred P. Stone	Democratic	October 8, 1844 – March 4, 1845	10th	[data missing]
Bellamy Storer	Anti-Jacksonian	March 4, 1835 – March 4, 1837	1st	[data missing]
Bellamy Storer	Republican	March 4, 1891 – March 4, 1895	1st	[data missing]
Peter Wilson Strader	Democratic	March 4, 1869 – March 4, 1871	1st	[data missing]
Ted Strickland	Democratic	January 3, 1993 – January 3, 1995	6th	[data missing]
Ted Strickland	Democratic	January 3, 1997 – January 3, 2007	6th	[data missing]
Luther M. Strong	Republican	March 4, 1893 – March 4, 1897	8th	[data missing]
Andrew Stuart	Democratic	March 4, 1853 – March 4, 1855	21st	[data missing]
Betty Sutton	Democratic	January 3, 2007 – January 3, 2013	13th	[data missing]
Henry Swearingen	Democratic	December 3, 1838 – March 4, 1841	19th	[data missing]
Martin L. Sweeney	Democratic	November 3, 1931 – January 3, 1943	20th	[data missing]
Robert E. Sweeney	Democratic	January 3, 1965 – January 3, 1967	At-large	[data missing]
George Sweeny	Democratic	March 4, 1839 – March 4, 1843	14th	[data missing]
Charles Sweetser	Democratic	March 4, 1849 – March 4, 1853	10th	[data missing]
Robert M. Switzer	Republican	March 4, 1911 – March 4, 1919	10th	[data missing]
Emilia Sykes	Democratic	January 3, 2023 – present	13th	Incumbent
Charles Phelps Taft	Republican	March 4, 1895 – March 4, 1897	1st	Retired
Robert Taft Jr.	Republican	January 3, 1963 – January 3, 1965	At-large	Retired to run for U.S. Senate
Robert Taft Jr.	Republican	January 3, 1967 – January 3, 1971	1st	Retired to run for U.S. Senate
Charles Tatgenhorst Jr.	Republican	November 8, 1927 – March 4, 1929	2nd	Elected to finish Ambrose E.B. Stephens's term Retired
Robert Walker Tayler	Republican	March 4, 1895 – March 4, 1903	18th	Retired
David James Taylor	Republican	January 3, 2025 – present	2nd	Incumbent
Edward L. Taylor Jr.	Republican	March 4, 1905 – March 4, 1913	12th	[data missing]
Ezra B. Taylor	Republican	December 13, 1880 – March 4, 1893	19th	[data missing]
Isaac Hamilton Taylor	Republican	March 4, 1885 – March 4, 1887	18th	[data missing]
John L. Taylor	Whig	March 4, 1847 – March 4, 1853	8th	[data missing]
John L. Taylor	Whig	March 4, 1853 – March 4, 1855	10th	[data missing]
Jonathan Taylor	Democratic	March 4, 1839 – March 4, 1841	12th	[data missing]
Joseph D. Taylor	Republican	January 2, 1883 – March 4, 1883	16th	[data missing]
Joseph D. Taylor	Republican	March 4, 1883 – March 4, 1885	17th	[data missing]
Joseph D. Taylor	Republican	March 4, 1887 – March 4, 1891	17th	[data missing]
Joseph D. Taylor	Republican	March 4, 1891 – March 4, 1893	18th	[data missing]
Vincent Albert Taylor	Republican	March 4, 1891 – March 4, 1893	20th	[data missing]
Thomas C. Theaker	Republican	March 4, 1859 – March 4, 1861	17th	[data missing]
William R. Thom	Democratic	March 4, 1933 – January 3, 1939	16th	[data missing]
William R. Thom	Democratic	January 3, 1941 – January 3, 1943	16th	[data missing]
William R. Thom	Democratic	January 3, 1945 – January 3, 1947	16th	[data missing]
W. Aubrey Thomas	Republican	November 8, 1904 – March 4, 1911	19th	[data missing]
Charles J. Thompson	Republican	March 4, 1919 – March 4, 1931	5th	[data missing]
Albert C. Thompson	Republican	March 4, 1885 – March 4, 1887	12th	[data missing]
Albert C. Thompson	Republican	March 4, 1887 – March 4, 1891	11th	[data missing]
John Thomson	Jacksonian	March 4, 1825 – March 4, 1827	6th	[data missing]
John Thomson	Jacksonian	March 4, 1829 – March 4, 1833	12th	[data missing]
John Thomson	Jacksonian	March 4, 1833 – March 4, 1837	17th	[data missing]
Allen G. Thurman	Democratic	March 4, 1845 – March 4, 1847	8th	[data missing]
Pat Tiberi	Republican	January 3, 2001 – January 15, 2018	12th	Resigned January 15, 2018, to lead the Ohio Business Roundtable
Daniel Rose Tilden	Whig	March 4, 1843 – March 4, 1847	19th	[data missing]
Cydnor B. Tompkins	Republican	March 4, 1857 – March 4, 1861	16th	[data missing]
Emmett Tompkins	Republican	March 4, 1901 – March 4, 1903	12th	[data missing]
William E. Tou Velle	Democratic	March 4, 1907 – March 4, 1911	4th	[data missing]
Amos Townsend	Republican	March 4, 1877 – March 4, 1883	20th	[data missing]
Norton S. Townshend	Democratic	March 4, 1851 – March 4, 1853	21st	[data missing]
James Traficant	Democratic	January 3, 1985 – July 24, 2002	17th	Expelled after being convicted of federal corruption charges
Carey A. Trimble	Republican	March 4, 1859 – March 4, 1863	10th	[data missing]
Charles V. Truax	Democratic	March 4, 1933 – August 9, 1935	At-large	Died
Mike Turner	Republican	January 3, 2003 – January 3, 2013	3rd	Incumbent
Mike Turner	Republican	January 3, 2013 – present	10th	Incumbent
Mell G. Underwood	Democratic	March 4, 1923 – April 10, 1936	11th	Resigned after becoming judge of the U.S. District Court for the Southern District of Ohio
Jonathan T. Updegraff	Republican	March 4, 1879 – March 4, 1881	18th	Died.
Jonathan T. Updegraff	Republican	March 4, 1881 – November 30, 1882	16th	Died.
William Hanford Upson	Republican	March 4, 1869 – March 4, 1873	18th	[data missing]
Clement L. Vallandigham	Democratic	May 25, 1858 – March 4, 1863	3rd	[data missing]
Philadelph Van Trump	Democratic	March 4, 1867 – March 4, 1873	12th	[data missing]
H. Clay Van Voorhis	Republican	March 4, 1893 – March 4, 1905	15th	[data missing]
Nelson Holmes Van Vorhes	Republican	March 4, 1875 – March 4, 1879	15th	[data missing]
John L. Vance	Democratic	March 4, 1875 – March 4, 1877	11th	[data missing]
Joseph Vance	Democratic-Republican	March 4, 1821 – March 4, 1823	5th	[data missing]
Joseph Vance	Democratic-Republican	March 4, 1823 – March 4, 1825	4th	[data missing]
Joseph Vance	Anti-Jacksonian	March 4, 1825 – March 4, 1829	4th	[data missing]
Joseph Vance	Anti-Jacksonian	March 4, 1829 – March 4, 1833	4th	[data missing]
Joseph Vance	Anti-Jacksonian	March 4, 1833 – March 4, 1835	10th	[data missing]
Joseph Vance	Whig	March 4, 1843 – March 4, 1847	4th	[data missing]
Charles Vanik	Democratic	January 3, 1955 – January 3, 1969	21st	[data missing]
Charles Vanik	Democratic	January 3, 1969 – January 3, 1981	22nd	[data missing]
John I. Vanmeter	Whig	March 4, 1843 – March 4, 1845	8th	[data missing]
Samuel Finley Vinton	Democratic-Republican	March 4, 1823 – March 4, 1825	7th	[data missing]
Samuel Finley Vinton	Anti-Jacksonian	March 4, 1825 – March 4, 1829	7th	[data missing]
Samuel Finley Vinton	Anti-Jacksonian	March 4, 1829 – March 4, 1833	7th	[data missing]
Samuel Finley Vinton	Anti-Jacksonian	March 4, 1833 – March 4, 1835	6th	[data missing]
Samuel Finley Vinton	Whig	March 4, 1835 – March 4, 1837	6th	[data missing]
Samuel Finley Vinton	Whig	March 4, 1843 – March 4, 1851	12th	[data missing]
John M. Vorys	Republican	January 3, 1939 – January 3, 1959	12th	[data missing]
Edward Wade	Free Soil	March 4, 1853 – March 4, 1855	19th	[data missing]
Edward Wade	Anti-Nebraska	March 4, 1855 – March 4, 1857	19th	[data missing]
Edward Wade	Republican	March 4, 1857 – March 4, 1861	19th	[data missing]
Earl T. Wagner	Democratic	January 3, 1949 – January 3, 1951	2nd	[data missing]
Jonathan Hasson Wallace	Democratic	May 27, 1884 – March 4, 1885	18th	[data missing]
Ansel T. Walling	Democratic	March 4, 1875 – March 4, 1877	12th	[data missing]
Adoniram J. Warner	Democratic	March 4, 1879 – March 4, 1881	13th	[data missing]
Adoniram J. Warner	Democratic	March 4, 1883 – March 4, 1885	15th	[data missing]
Adoniram J. Warner	Democratic	March 4, 1885 – March 4, 1887	17th	[data missing]
William R. Warnock	Republican	March 4, 1901 – March 4, 1905	8th	[data missing]
John G. Warwick	Democratic	March 4, 1891 – August 14, 1892	16th	Died
Cooper K. Watson	Anti-Nebraska	March 4, 1855 – March 4, 1857	9th	[data missing]
David K. Watson	Republican	March 4, 1895 – March 4, 1897	12th	[data missing]
Walter Lowrie Weaver	Republican	March 4, 1897 – March 4, 1901	7th	[data missing]
Amos R. Webber	Republican	November 8, 1904 – March 4, 1907	14th	[data missing]
Ed Weber	Republican	January 3, 1981 – January 3, 1983	9th	[data missing]
Taylor Webster	Jacksonian	March 4, 1833 – March 4, 1837	2nd	[data missing]
Taylor Webster	Democratic	March 4, 1837 – March 4, 1839	2nd	[data missing]
Capell L. Weems	Republican	November 3, 1903 – March 4, 1909	16th	[data missing]
Alvin F. Weichel	Republican	January 3, 1943 – January 3, 1955	13th	[data missing]
John Welch	Whig	March 4, 1851 – March 4, 1853	12th	[data missing]
Martin Welker	Republican	March 4, 1865 – March 4, 1871	14th	[data missing]
John B. Weller	Democratic	March 4, 1839 – March 4, 1845	2nd	[data missing]
Benjamin F. Welty	Democratic	March 4, 1917 – March 4, 1921	4th	[data missing]
Brad Wenstrup	Republican	January 3, 2013 – January 3, 2025	2nd	Retired.
Charles F. West	Democratic	March 4, 1931 – January 3, 1935	17th	[data missing]
Charles W. Whalen Jr.	Republican	January 3, 1967 – January 3, 1979	3rd	[data missing]
John Jefferson Whitacre	Democratic	March 4, 1911 – March 4, 1915	18th	[data missing]
Chilton A. White	Democratic	March 4, 1861 – March 4, 1865	6th	[data missing]
Dudley A. White	Republican	January 3, 1937 – January 3, 1941	13th	[data missing]
George White	Democratic	March 4, 1911 – March 4, 1915	15th	[data missing]
George White	Democratic	March 4, 1917 – March 4, 1919	15th	[data missing]
Joseph W. White	Democratic	March 4, 1863 – March 4, 1865	16th	[data missing]
Wilbur M. White	Republican	March 4, 1931 – March 4, 1933	9th	[data missing]
William J. White	Republican	March 4, 1893 – March 4, 1895	20th	[data missing]
Elisha Whittlesey	Democratic-Republican	March 4, 1823 – March 4, 1825	13th	Resigned
Elisha Whittlesey	Anti-Jacksonian	March 4, 1825 – March 4, 1829	13th	Resigned
Elisha Whittlesey	Anti-Jacksonian	March 4, 1829 – March 4, 1833	13th	Resigned
Elisha Whittlesey	Anti-Masonic	March 4, 1833 – March 4, 1835	16th	Resigned
Elisha Whittlesey	Whig	March 4, 1835 – July 9, 1838	16th	Resigned
William A. Whittlesey	Democratic	March 4, 1849 – March 4, 1851	13th	[data missing]
Charles Preston Wickham	Republican	March 4, 1887 – March 4, 1891	14th	[data missing]
Beriah Wilkins	Democratic	March 4, 1883 – March 4, 1885	16th	[data missing]
Beriah Wilkins	Democratic	March 4, 1885 – March 4, 1887	15th	[data missing]
Beriah Wilkins	Democratic	March 4, 1887 – March 4, 1889	16th	[data missing]
Elihu S. Williams	Democratic	March 4, 1887 – March 4, 1891	3rd	[data missing]
Lyle Williams	Republican	January 3, 1979 – January 3, 1983	19th	[data missing]
Lyle Williams	Republican	January 3, 1983 – January 3, 1985	17th	[data missing]
Seward H. Williams	Republican	March 4, 1915 – March 4, 1917	14th	[data missing]
Frank B. Willis	Republican	March 4, 1911 – January 9, 1915	8th	Resigned after being elected Governor
Charlie Wilson	Democratic	January 3, 2007 – January 3, 2011	6th	[data missing]
George W. Wilson	Republican	March 4, 1893 – March 4, 1897	7th	[data missing]
John Thomas Wilson	Republican	March 4, 1867 – March 4, 1873	11th	[data missing]
William Wilson	Democratic-Republican	March 4, 1823 – March 4, 1825	8th	[data missing]
William Wilson	Anti-Jacksonian	March 4, 1825 – June 6, 1827	8th	Died
James J. Winans	Republican	March 4, 1869 – March 4, 1871	7th	[data missing]
Amos E. Wood	Democratic	December 3, 1849 – November 19, 1850	6th	Died
John Woods	Anti-Jacksonian	March 4, 1825 – March 4, 1829	2nd	[data missing]
Laurin D. Woodworth	Republican	March 4, 1873 – March 4, 1877	17th	[data missing]
Samuel T. Worcester	Republican	March 4, 1861 – March 4, 1863	13th	[data missing]
John C. Wright	Democratic-Republican	March 4, 1823 – March 4, 1825	11th	[data missing]
John C. Wright	Anti-Jacksonian	March 4, 1825 – March 4, 1829	11th	[data missing]
Chalmers P. Wylie	Republican	January 3, 1967 – January 3, 1993	15th	[data missing]
Samuel S. Yoder	Democratic	March 4, 1887 – March 4, 1891	4th	[data missing]
Stephen M. Young	Democratic	March 4, 1933 – January 3, 1937	At-large	[data missing]
Stephen M. Young	Democratic	January 3, 1941 – January 3, 1943	At-large	[data missing]
Stephen M. Young	Democratic	January 3, 1949 – January 3, 1951	At-large	[data missing]
Thomas L. Young	Republican	March 4, 1879 – March 4, 1883	2nd	[data missing]

== See also ==
- List of United States senators from Ohio
- Ohio's congressional delegations
- Ohio's congressional districts
