= John Crowell =

John Crowell may refer to:

- John Crowell (Alabama politician) (1780–1846), Delegate and Representative from Alabama
- John Crowell (Ohio politician) (1801–1883), Representative from Ohio
- John Franklin Crowell (1857–1931), President of Trinity College (later Duke University)
