= Senator Kilgore (disambiguation) =

Harley M. Kilgore (1893–1956) was a U.S. Senator from New Hampshire from 1941 to 1956. Senator Kilgore may also refer to:

- Constantine B. Kilgore (1835–1897), Texas State Senate
- Daniel Kilgore (politician) (1794–1851), Ohio State Senate
