= John Crowell (Ohio politician) =

American politician and lawyer

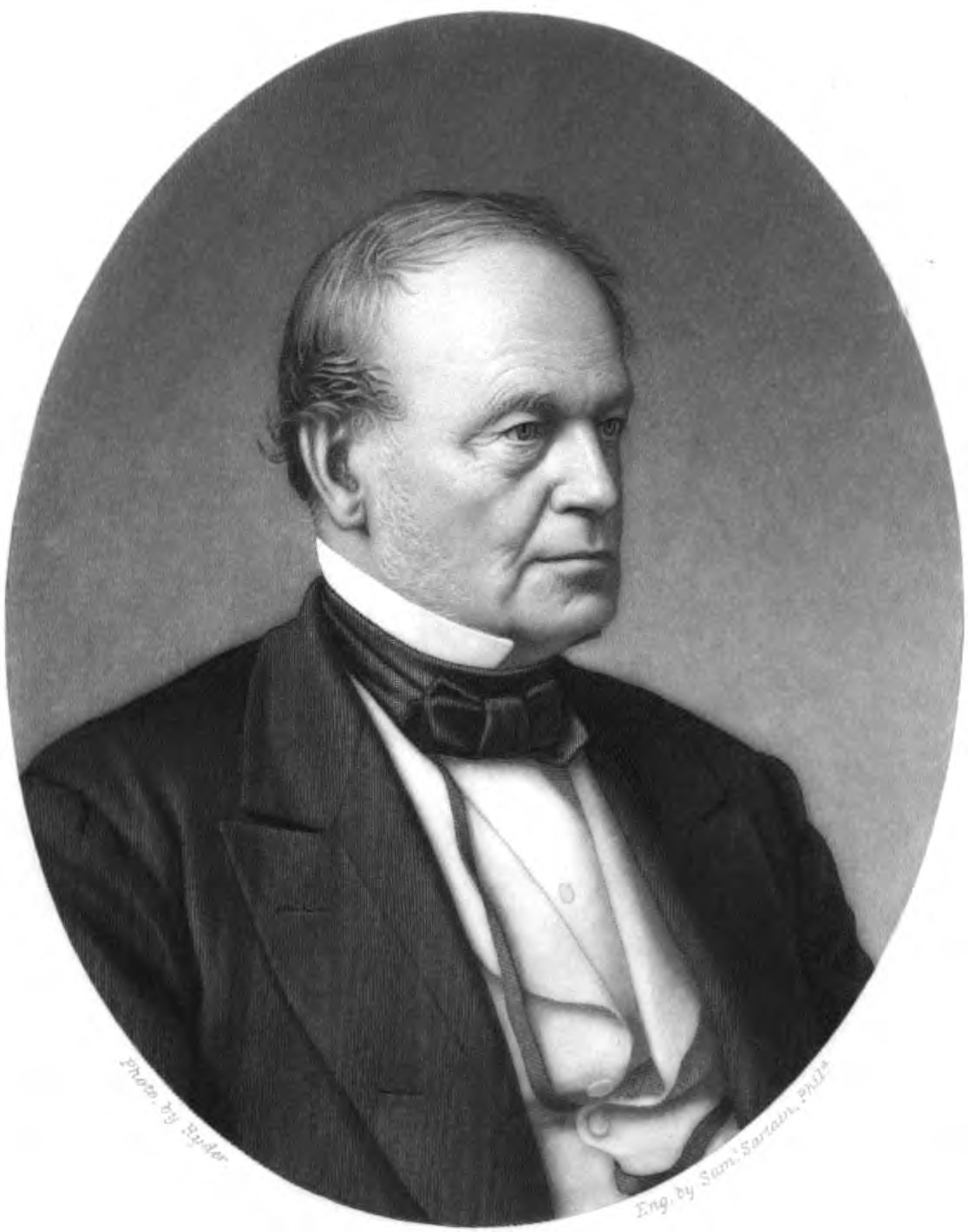

Member of the U.S. House of Representatives from Ohio's 19th district
- In office March 4, 1847 – March 3, 1851
- Preceded by: Daniel R. Tilden
- Succeeded by: Eben Newton

Personal details
- Born: September 15, 1801 East Haddam, Connecticut, U.S.
- Died: March 8, 1883 (aged 81) Cleveland, Ohio, U.S.
- Resting place: Lake View Cemetery, Cleveland, Ohio
- Party: Whig
- Spouse: Eliza B. Estabrook
- Children: four
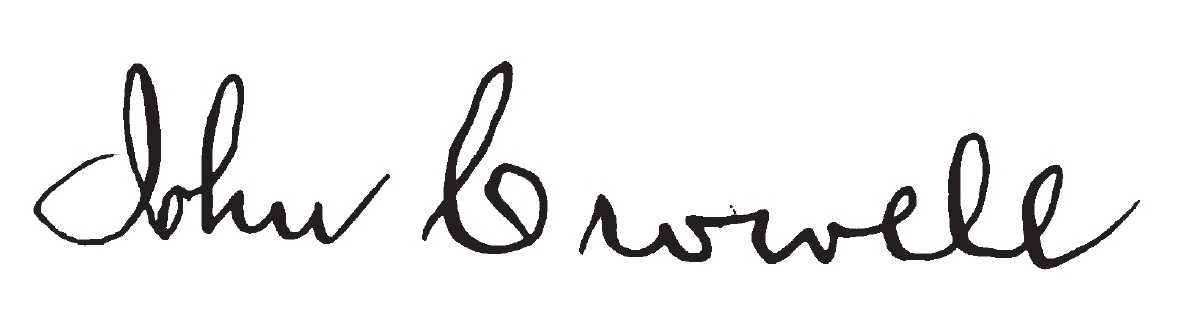
- Signature

John Crowell (September 15, 1801 – March 8, 1883) was an American lawyer and newspaperman who was a two-term U.S. representative from Ohio from 1847 to 1851.

== Biography ==
Born in East Haddam, Connecticut, Crowell moved to Ohio in 1806 with his parents, who settled in Rome Township, Ashtabula County, Ohio, where his father, Samuel Crowell, was the first settler. He attended the district school. He moved to Warren, Ohio, in 1822 and he attended Warren Academy from 1822 to 1825. He studied law and was admitted to the bar in 1827 and commenced practice in Warren. He was also part owner and editor of the Western Reserve Chronicle at Warren. He served as member of the State senate in 1840.

=== Congress ===
Crowell was elected as a Whig to the Thirtieth and Thirty-first Congresses (March 4, 1847 – March 3, 1851). In the 1846 election he defeated John Hutchins, abolitionist, and Rufus P. Ranney, Democrat. He was not a candidate for renomination in 1850.

=== Later career ===
He moved to Cleveland, Ohio, in 1852 and resumed the practice of law. He served in the State militia for twenty years, holding the rank of brigadier general and subsequently that of major general. He became editor of the Western Law Monthly, published in Cleveland, and a member of the faculty of the Homeopathic Medical College. He served as president of the Ohio State and Union Law College of Cleveland from 1862 to 1876, when he retired.

=== Death and burial ===
He died in Cleveland, Ohio, March 8, 1883. He was interred in Lake View Cemetery.

Crowell was married to Eliza B. Estabrook in 1833, and had four children.

== Sources ==
- United States Congress. "John Crowell (id: C000941)". Biographical Directory of the United States Congress.

Ohio Senate
Preceded by David Tod	Senator from Trumbull County District; December 7, 1840 – December 4, 1842	Succeeded by Eben Newton
U.S. House of Representatives
Preceded by Daniel R. Tilden	Member of the U.S. House of Representatives from Ohio's 19th congressional district 1847–1851	Succeeded by Eben Newton
