= Albert G. Riddle =

American politician

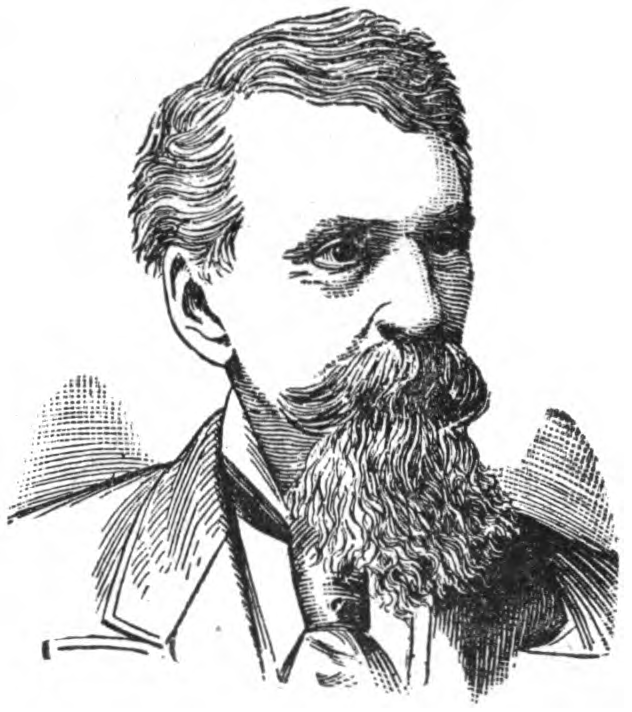

Member of the U.S. House of Representatives from Ohio's 19th district
- In office March 4, 1861 – March 3, 1863
- Preceded by: Edward Wade
- Succeeded by: James A. Garfield

Member of the Ohio House of Representatives from the Geauga & Trumbull Counties district
- In office December 4, 1848 – December 1, 1850 Serving with Isaac Lee; John Hutchins
- Preceded by: Anson Matthews
- Succeeded by: M. C. Bradley; G. H. Kent

Personal details
- Born: Albert Gallatin Riddle; May 28, 1816 Monson, Massachusetts, U.S.
- Died: May 15, 1902 (aged 85) Washington, D.C., U.S.
- Resting place: Rock Creek Cemetery; Washington, D.C., U.S.
- Party: Republican

Albert Gallatin Riddle (May 28, 1816 – May 15, 1902) was a 19th-century American lawyer and politician who served one term as a U.S. representative from Ohio from 1861 to 1863.

== Early life ==
Born in Monson, Massachusetts, Riddle moved with his parents to Newbury, in the Western Reserve of Ohio, in 1817. He completed preparatory studies, and then studied law.

== Career ==
Riddle was admitted to the bar in 1840 and began practice in Geauga County, serving as prosecuting attorney of that county from 1840 to 1846.

=== Early political career ===
He served as member of the Ohio House of Representatives from 1848 to 1850, and in 1848 called the first Free Soil convention in Ohio.

Riddle moved to Cleveland, Ohio, in 1850. He was elected prosecuting attorney in 1856, and in 1859 he defended the Oberlin slave rescuers.

=== Congress ===
He served as a Republican in the Thirty-seventh Congress (March 4, 1861 – March 3, 1863), making speeches in favor of arming slaves, the first on this subject that were delivered in Congress, and others on emancipation in the District of Columbia and in vindication of President Lincoln. He was not a candidate for renomination in 1862.

=== Later career ===
After his term in Congress, Riddle served as consul at Matanzas, Cuba, in 1863 and 1864. He then returned to Washington, D.C., and again engaged in the practice of law. He was retained by the State Department to aid in the prosecution of John H. Surratt as one of the accomplices in the murder of President Abraham Lincoln.

He also served as law officer of the District of Columbia 1877–1889. He was in charge of the law department at Howard University for several years after its establishment.

In 1876, Riddle moved Belva Ann Lockwood for admission to the bar of the United States Supreme Court. The Court denied her admission because Lockwood was a woman. Three years later, in 1879, President Rutherford B. Hayes signed into law a bill that allowed any woman who had been a member in good standing of the bar of any state, territory, of the District of Columbia for three years, and had good moral character, to be admitted to the Supreme Court bar. Riddle then again moved for Lockwood to be admitted to the Supreme Court bar, and the Court admitted her. Lockwood thus became the first woman admitted to the bar of the U.S. Supreme Court.

== Death and legacy ==
Riddle died at his home in Washington, D.C., on May 15, 1902. He was interred in Rock Creek Cemetery.

His papers are at the Western Reserve Historical Society, Cleveland, Ohio. They include the unpublished manuscript Accounts of experiences in Cuba (1862–1864).

== Works ==
- Students and Lawyers, lectures (Washington, 1873)
- Bart Ridgeley, a Story of Northern Ohio (Boston, 1873)
- The Portrait, a Romance of Cuyahoga Valley (1874)
- Alice Brand, a Tale of the Capitol (New York, 1875)
- Life, Character, and Public Services of James A. Garfield (Cleveland, 1880)
- The House of Ross (Boston, 1881)
- Castle Gregory (Cleveland, 1882)
- Hart and his Bear (Washington, 1883)
- The Young Sugar Makers of the West Woods (Cleveland, 1885)
- The Hunter of the Chagrin (1882)
- Mark Loan, a Tale of the Western Reserve (1883)
- Old Newberry and the Pioneers (1884)
- Speeches and Arguments (Washington, 1886)
- Life of Benjamin F. Wade (Cleveland, 1886)
- Recollections of War Times, 1860–1865
- Ansel's Cave: A Story of Early Life in the Western Reserve (Cleveland, 1893)

U.S. House of Representatives
Preceded by Edward Wade	Member of the U.S. House of Representatives from Ohio's 19th congressional district 1861–1863	Succeeded by James A. Garfield
