= Edward Wade =

American politician (1802–1866)

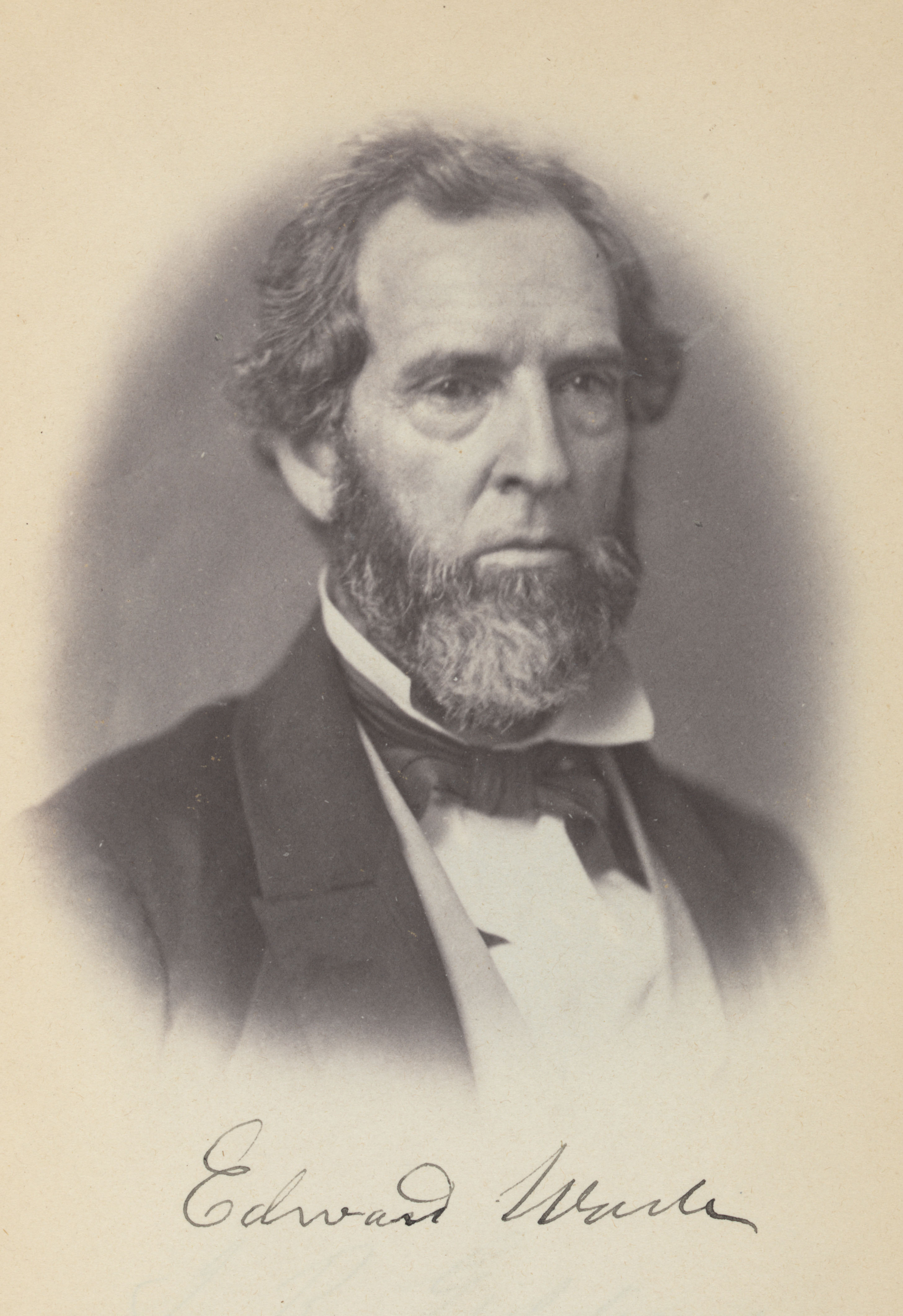

Member of the U.S. House of Representatives from Ohio's 19th district
- In office March 4, 1853 – March 3, 1861
- Preceded by: Eben Newton
- Succeeded by: Albert G. Riddle

Personal details
- Born: November 22, 1802 West Springfield, Massachusetts, U.S.
- Died: August 13, 1866 (aged 63) East Cleveland, Ohio, U.S.
- Party: Republican
- Relations: Benjamin Wade (brother)

Edward Wade (November 22, 1802 – August 13, 1866) was an American lawyer and politician who served four terms as a U.S. representative from Ohio from 1853 to 1861. He was the brother of Benjamin Wade.

== Biography ==
Born in West Springfield, Massachusetts, Wade received a limited schooling. He moved to Andover, Ohio, in 1821, where he studied law. He was admitted to the bar in 1827 and commenced practice in Jefferson, Ohio. He was served as Justice of the Peace of Ashtabula County in 1831. He moved to Unionville in 1832. He served as prosecuting attorney of Ashtabula County 1833. He moved to Cleveland in 1837.

=== Congress ===
Wade was elected as a Free-Soil candidate to the Thirty-third Congress and reelected as a Republican to the Thirty-fourth, Thirty-fifth, and Thirty-sixth Congresses (March 4, 1853 – March 3, 1861). In January 1854, he was one of six signatories of the "Appeal of the Independent Democrats", drafted to oppose the Kansas-Nebraska Act. He was not a candidate for renomination in 1860.

=== Death ===
He died in East Cleveland, Ohio, August 13, 1866, and was interred in Woodland Cemetery in Cleveland, Ohio.

== Bibliography ==
- United States Congress. "Edward Wade (id: W000006)". Biographical Directory of the United States Congress.

U.S. House of Representatives
Preceded by Eben Newton	Member of the U.S. House of Representatives from Ohio's 19th congressional district 1853–1861	Succeeded by Albert G. Riddle
