= Daniel R. Tilden =

American politician

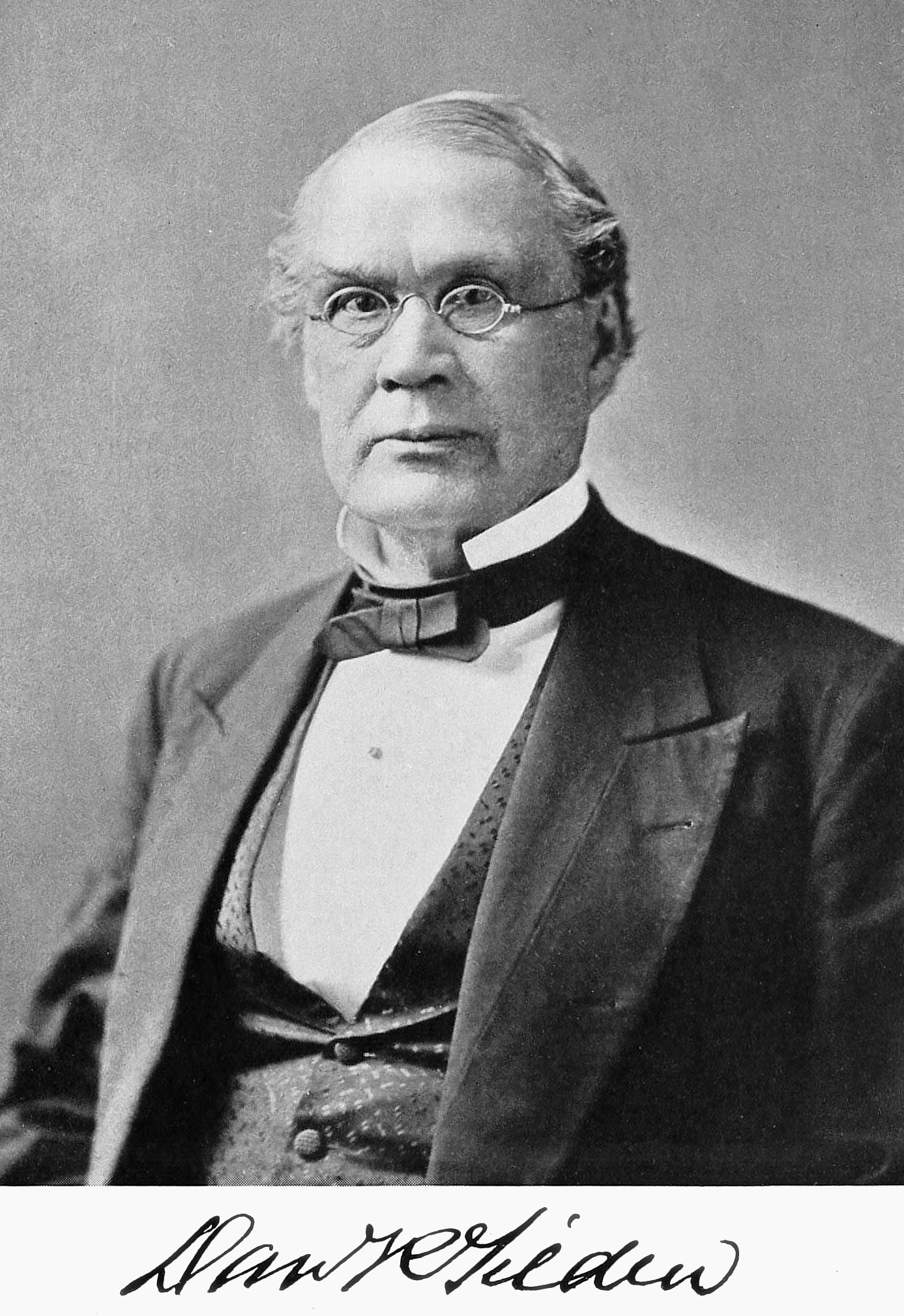

Member of the U.S. House of Representatives from Ohio's 19th district
- In office March 4, 1843 – March 3, 1847
- Preceded by: Samuel Stokely
- Succeeded by: John Crowell

Personal details
- Born: Daniel Rose Tilden; November 5, 1804 Lebanon, Connecticut, US
- Died: March 4, 1890 (aged 85) Cleveland, Ohio, US
- Resting place: Buffalo Crematory, Buffalo, New York
- Party: Whig
- Spouse: Cornelia Lossing

Daniel Rose Tilden (November 5, 1804 – March 4, 1890) was an American lawyer and politician who served two terms as a U.S. representative from Ohio from 1843 to 1847.

== Biography ==
Born in Lebanon, Connecticut, Tilden attended the public schools. Resided several years in Virginia and South Carolina. He moved to Garrettsville, Ohio, about 1828, and thence to Warren, Ohio. He studied law with Rufus P. Spalding. He was admitted to the bar in 1836 and commenced practice in Ravenna, Ohio. He formed a partnership there as Spalding & Tilden. He served as prosecuting attorney of Portage County 1838-1841.

=== Congress ===
Tilden was elected as a Whig to the Twenty-eighth and Twenty-ninth Congresses (March 4, 1843 – March 3, 1847).

He served as delegate to the Whig National Convention in 1848 and 1852.

He moved to Cleveland, Ohio, in 1852.

=== Later career ===
Tilden was elected probate judge of Cuyahoga County and served from 1855 to 1888.

=== Death and burial ===
He died in Cleveland, Ohio, March 4, 1890. His remains were cremated at Buffalo, New York, and the ashes deposited in the Buffalo Crematory.

=== Personal life ===
Married three times, the last to Cornelia Lossing, who survived him.

U.S. House of Representatives
Preceded by Samuel Stokely	Member of the U.S. House of Representatives from Ohio's 19th congressional district 1843–1847	Succeeded by John Crowell
