= Eben Newton =

American politician

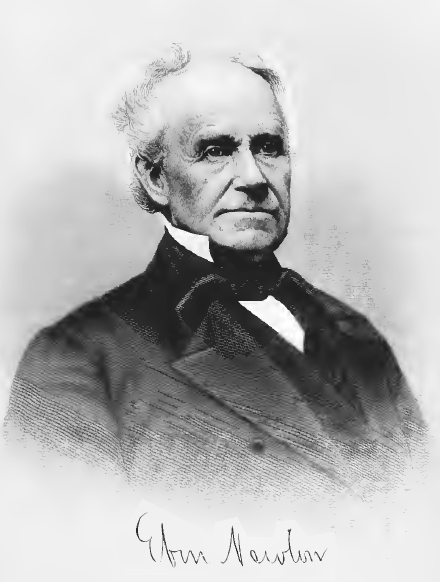

Member of the U.S. House of Representatives from Ohio's 19th district
- In office March 4, 1851 – March 3, 1853
- Preceded by: John Crowell
- Succeeded by: Edward Wade

Member of the Ohio Senate from the Trumbull County district
- In office December 5, 1842 – December 1, 1844
- Preceded by: John Crowell
- Succeeded by: Samuel Quinby

Member of the Ohio Senate from the 23rd district
- In office January 4, 1864 – December 31, 1865
- Preceded by: Samuel Quinby
- Succeeded by: G. F. Brown

Personal details
- Born: October 16, 1795 Goshen, Connecticut, U.S.
- Died: November 6, 1885 (aged 90) Canfield, Ohio, U.S.
- Resting place: Canfield Village Cemetery
- Party: Whig
- Spouse: Mary Church
- Children: four

Eben Newton (October 16, 1795 – November 6, 1885) was an American lawyer and politician who served one term as a U.S. representative from Ohio from 1851 to 1853.

== Early life and career ==
Born in Goshen, Connecticut, Newton attended the common schools. He moved to Portage County, Ohio, in 1814 and engaged in agricultural pursuits. He studied law with Darius Lyman and John Sloane. Newton was admitted to the bar in 1823 and commenced practice in Canfield, Ohio. He formed a partnership with Elisha Whittlesey that lasted for twenty years. He served as member of the Ohio Senate from 1842 to 1851. He was the presiding judge of the court of common pleas from 1844 to 1851.

== Congress ==
Newton was elected as a Whig to the Thirty-second Congress (March 4, 1851 – March 3, 1853). He was an unsuccessful candidate for reelection in 1852 to the Thirty-third Congress.

== Later career ==
He served as president of the Ashtabula & New Lisbon Railroad 1856–1859, and again served in the state senate from 1862 to 1864 during the American Civil War. He resumed the practice of law and also engaged in agricultural pursuits. He raised beef cattle on farms near Canfield.

== Death ==
He made a trip to California, returning with a cold, which led to his death within a month. He died in Canfield, Ohio, on November 6, 1885, and was interred in Canfield Village Cemetery.

== Personal life ==
Newton married Mary Church of Canfield, May 1826. They had one son and three daughters. He was a Presbyterian.

U.S. House of Representatives
Preceded by John Crowell	Member of the U.S. House of Representatives from Ohio's 19th congressional district 1851–1853	Succeeded by Edward Wade
