= Charles J. Carney =

American politician

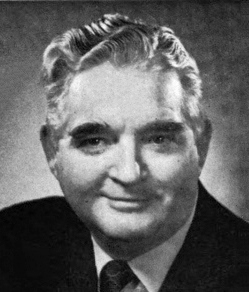
- Official portrait, 1973

Member of the U.S. House of Representatives from Ohio's 19th district
- In office November 3, 1970 – January 3, 1979
- Preceded by: Michael J. Kirwan
- Succeeded by: Lyle Williams

Member of the Ohio Senate from the 33rd district
- In office January 3, 1950-November 3, 1970
- Preceded by: District Established
- Succeeded by: Harry Meshel

Personal details
- Born: Charles Joseph Carney; April 17, 1913 Youngstown, Ohio
- Died: October 7, 1987 (aged 74)
- Resting place: Calvary Cemetery in Youngstown
- Party: Democratic
- Education: Youngstown State University Cleveland-Marshall College of Law at Cleveland State University

Charles Joseph Carney (April 17, 1913 – October 7, 1987) was an American labor leader and politician who served as a member of the U.S. House of Representatives from Ohio from 1970 to 1979.

== Early life and career ==
Born in Youngstown, Ohio, Carney attended schools in Youngstown and neighboring Campbell, Ohio. He later attended Youngstown State University.

=== State Senate ===
Carney was a member of the Ohio Senate from 1950 to 1970, serving as minority leader from 1969 to 1970.

=== Organized labor ===
Prior to his involvement in public service, Carney was involved with Youngstown-area labor organizations. He served as a staff member of the vice-president, and president, of the United Rubber Workers Union Local 102 from 1934 to 1950. He served as staff representative of United Steelworkers of America from 1950 to 1968. Carney also served as vice-president of the Mahoning County CIO Industrial Council.

== Congress ==
Carney was elected to Congress as a Democrat in 1970, defeating attorney Richard McLaughlin, to the Ninety-first Congress, by special election, to fill the vacancy caused by the death of incumbent Michael J. Kirwan, and reelected to the four succeeding Congresses, from (November 3, 1970 – January 3, 1979). He was an unsuccessful candidate for reelection to the Ninety-sixth Congress in 1978.

== Death ==
Charles Joseph Carney died on October 7, 1987, in Youngstown, Ohio. He was interred in Calvary Cemetery.

U.S. House of Representatives
Preceded by Michael J. Kirwan	Member of the U.S. House of Representatives from Ohio's 19th congressional district 1970–1979	Succeeded by Lyle Williams
