= John G. Cooper =

American politician (1872–1955)

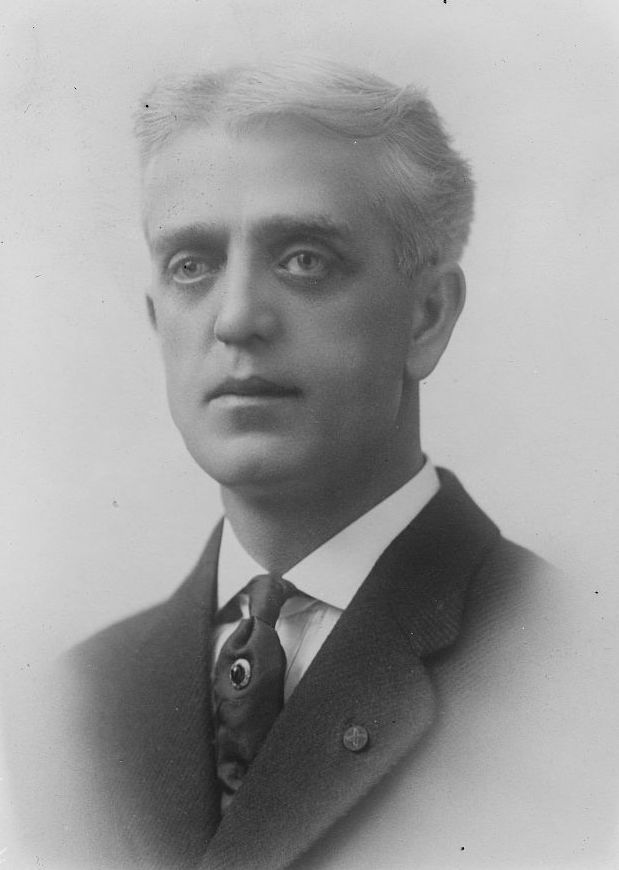

Member of the U.S. House of Representatives from Ohio's 19th district
- In office March 4, 1915 – January 3, 1937
- Preceded by: Ellsworth R. Bathrick
- Succeeded by: Michael J. Kirwan

Member of the Ohio House of Representatives from the Mahoning County district
- In office January 2, 1911 – January 3, 1915 Serving with Oscar E. Diser
- Preceded by: Randall H. Anderson
- Succeeded by: A. O. Fleming, David Heinselman

Personal details
- Born: John Gordon Cooper; April 27, 1872 Smallthorne, Staffordshire, England
- Died: January 7, 1955 (aged 82) Hagerstown, Maryland, U.S.
- Resting place: Lake Park Cemetery, Youngstown, Ohio
- Party: Republican

John Gordon Cooper (April 27, 1872 – January 7, 1955) was an Anglo-American railroad worker and politician who served 11 terms as a U.S. representative from Ohio from 1915 to 1937.

== Early years ==
According to his birth certificate, Cooper was born in Smallthorne, Staffordshire, England. Cooper emigrated from England to the United States in 1881 with his mother, grandmother and brothers, as his father had emigrated in 1880. The family settled in Youngstown, Ohio, where he attended the public schools and began work in local steel mills in 1885.

=== Railroads ===
He entered the service of the Pennsylvania Railroad Company in 1896, where he was employed as a locomotive fireman between 1896 and 1900, and as an engineer from 1900 and 1915.

== Political career ==
Cooper served as member of the Republican county committee in 1906. In 1910, he was a delegate to the Republican State convention, and he served as a member of the State house of representatives from 1910 to 1912.

=== Congress ===
Cooper was elected as a Republican to the Sixty-fourth and to the 10 succeeding Congresses between (March 4, 1915 and January 3, 1937). He was an unsuccessful candidate for reelection in 1936 to the Seventy-fifth Congress.

He then went on to serve as chairman of the Board of Claims, Ohio Industrial Commission from 1937 to 1945.

== Retirement ==
Cooper retired from public and political activities in 1947 and resided in Youngstown, Ohio.

== Death and burial ==
He died in Hagerstown, Maryland, January 7, 1955, and was interred in Lake Park Cemetery, in Youngstown, Ohio.

== Sources ==
- United States Congress. "John G. Cooper (id: C000757)". Biographical Directory of the United States Congress.

U.S. House of Representatives
Preceded by Ellsworth R. Bathrick	Member of the U.S. House of Representatives from Ohio's 19th congressional district 1915–1937	Succeeded by Michael J. Kirwan
