= Daniel Kilgore (politician) =

American politician (1794–1851)

Member of the U.S. House of Representatives from Ohio's 19th district
- In office December 1, 1834 – July 4, 1838
- Preceded by: Humphrey H. Leavitt
- Succeeded by: Henry Swearingen

Member of the Ohio Senate from the Harrison County district
- In office December 1, 1828 – December 2, 1832
- Preceded by: Matthew Simpson
- Succeeded by: Joseph Holmes

Personal details
- Born: May 24, 1794 Kings Creek, Virginia, U.S. (now West Virginia)
- Died: December 12, 1851 (aged 57) New York City, New York, U.S.
- Party: Jacksonian; Democratic
- Spouses: Mary Pritchard; Ellen Downey
- Children: Ten

Daniel Kilgore (May 24, 1794 – December 12, 1851) was an American politician who served three terms as a U.S. representative from Ohio from 1834 to 1838.

== Biography ==
Born at Kings Creek, Virginia (now West Virginia), Kilgore received a liberal schooling.

=== Early political career ===
He moved to Cadiz, Ohio, and served as member of the Ohio Senate from 1828 to 1832.

=== Congress ===
Kilgore was elected as a Jacksonian to the Twenty-third Congress to fill the vacancy caused by the resignation of Humphrey H. Leavitt. Kilgore was again elected as a Jacksonian to the Twenty-fourth Congress. He was reelected, this time as a Democrat, to the Twenty-fifth Congress. He subsequently served from December 1, 1834, until July 4, 1838, when he resigned from politics.

=== Later career and death ===
Kilgore moved to Steubenville, Ohio in 1850, and was elected president of the Steubenville and Indiana Railroad.

He died while visiting New York City on December 12, 1851.

U.S. House of Representatives
Preceded by Humphrey H. Leavitt	Member of the U.S. House of Representatives from Ohio's 19th congressional district 1834–1838	Succeeded by Henry Swearingen
