= Henry Swearingen =

American politician (1792–1849)

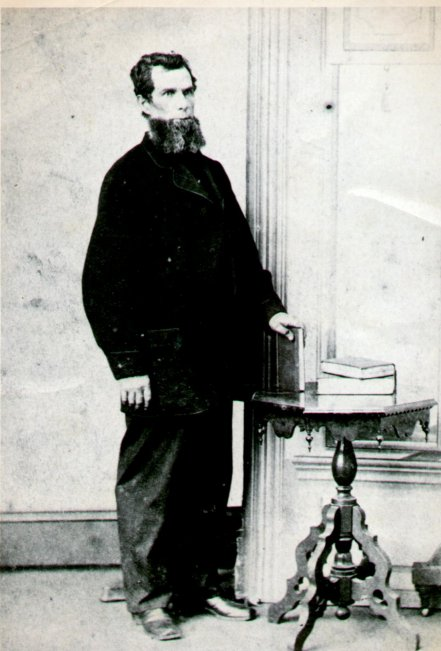

Member of the U.S. House of Representatives from Ohio's 19th district
- In office December 3, 1838 – March 4, 1841
- Preceded by: Daniel Kilgore
- Succeeded by: Samuel Stokely

Member of the Ohio Senate from the Jefferson County district
- In office 1829–1830
- Preceded by: Humphrey H. Leavitt
- Succeeded by: Andrew McMechan

Personal details
- Born: 1792 Northern Panhandle of Virginia (now West Virginia)
- Died: January 1849 (aged 56–57) At sea
- Party: Democratic
- Occupation: Politician

Henry Swearingen (1792 – January 1849) was an American politician. A Democrat, he was a member of the United States House of Representatives from Ohio. Ideologically, he was a member of the Locofocos faction.

== Biography ==
Swearingen was born in 1792, in the Northern Panhandle of Virginia (now West Virginia), the son of Daniel V. Swearingen and Rebecca (née Dawson) Swearingen. According to Thomas William Herringshaw, he was born in Pennsylvania. He later moved to near Steubenville, Ohio. From 1824 to 1828, and again from 1830 to 1832, he was sheriff of Jefferson County.

A Democrat, Swearingen was a member of the Locofocos faction. In 1829 and 1830, he represented Jefferson County in the Ohio Senate. Following the death of Daniel Kilgore, he was elected to the United States House of Representatives; he was re-elected for the following term. He served from December 3, 1838, to March 4, 1841, representing Ohio's 19th district. Ideologically, he leaned liberal.

On July 16, 1807, Swearingen married Mary Swearingen. He died in January 1849, aged 56 or 57, aboard a ship traveling from California to Ohio. According to Herringshaw, he died in Smithfield, Ohio. He was buried at sea.

U.S. House of Representatives
Preceded by Daniel Kilgore	Member of the U.S. House of Representatives from Ohio's 19th congressional district 1838–1841	Succeeded by Samuel Stokely
