= Kings Creek, West Virginia =

- Unincorporated community
- Location within West Virginia Location within the United States
- Coordinates: 40°26′53″N 80°35′46″W
- Country: United States
- State: West Virginia
- County: Hancock
- Time zone: UTC-5 (Eastern (EST))
  - Summer (DST): UTC-4 (EDT)

Kings Creek is an unincorporated community in Hancock County, West Virginia, United States. It lies at an elevation of 692 feet (211 m).
