= Samuel Stokely =

American politician (1796–1861)

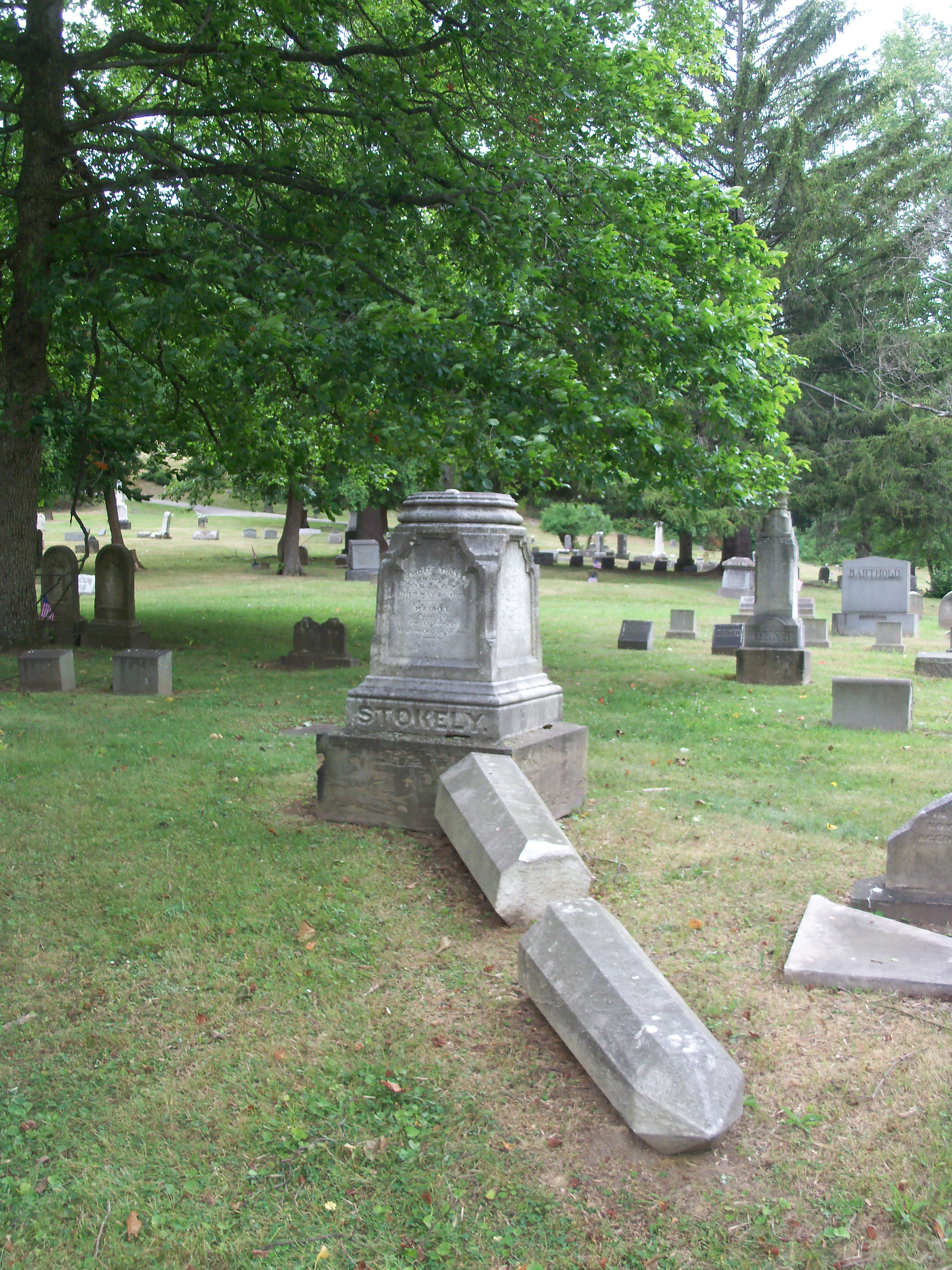
- Stokely's tombstone in Steubenville, Ohio

Member of the U.S. House of Representatives from Ohio's 19th district
- In office March 4, 1841 – March 3, 1843
- Preceded by: Henry Swearingen
- Succeeded by: Daniel R. Tilden

Member of the Ohio Senate from Jefferson County
- In office 1837–1839
- Preceded by: Andrew McMechan
- Succeeded by: James Mitchell

Personal details
- Born: January 25, 1796 Washington, Pennsylvania, U.S.
- Died: May 23, 1861 (aged 65) Steubenville, Ohio, U.S.
- Resting place: Union Cemetery
- Party: Whig
- Spouse(s): Rachel Mason (m. 1830) Mrs. Lowther; Mrs. Burton
- Children: 4
- Education: Washington College

Samuel Stokely (January 25, 1796 – May 23, 1861) was an American lawyer and politician who served one term as a U.S. representative from Ohio from 1841 to 1843.

== Early life ==
Born in Washington, Pennsylvania, Stokely attended private schools. He graduated from Washington College (now Washington and Jefferson College), Washington, Pennsylvania, in 1813. Next he studied law. He was admitted to the bar and commenced practice in Steubenville, Ohio, in 1817.

== Political career ==
He was United States land receiver 1821–1833. He served as a member of the State senate in 1837 and 1838.

=== Congress ===
Stokely was elected as a Whig to the Twenty-seventh Congress (March 4, 1841 – March 3, 1843).

== Later career and death ==
He resumed the practice of law in Steubenville, where he died May 23, 1861. He was interred in Union Cemetery.

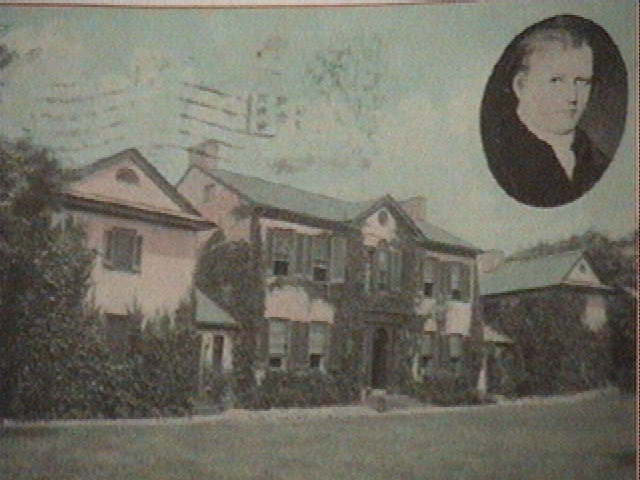
the Grove, where Stokely lived from about 1830

In April 1830, he married Rachel Mason. He purchased the Bezaleel Wells homestead, The Grove, at a sheriff's sale, and he and his descendants lived there for sixty years. He was a general in the militia, and also married and was survived by Mrs. Lowther and Mrs. Burton. He had four children.

U.S. House of Representatives
| Preceded by Henry Swearingen | United States Representative from Ohio's 19th congressional district 1841–1843 | Succeeded by Daniel R. Tilden |
Ohio Senate
| Preceded by Andrew McMechan | Senator from Jefferson County; 1837-1839 | Succeeded by James Mitchell |
Political offices
| Preceded by Peter Wilson | Receiver of Steubenville Federal Land Office; 1821-1833 | Succeeded by John Viers |
