= Ohio's 19th congressional district =

Defunct U.S. Congress electoral division

- Obsolete district
- Created: 1830
- Eliminated: 2003
- Years active: 1833-2003

Ohio's 19th congressional district was created following the 1830 census and was eliminated after the 2000 census. Between 1863 and 1880, it was represented by future US President James A. Garfield, who became the only sitting House member ever to be elected to the Presidency.

From 1992–2002 it included all of Lake County and Ashtabula County together with a collection of eastern suburbs of Cleveland. After 2002 it was replaced by the 14th district. Parts of its old territory were redistricted into 11th, and 13th districts.

== List of members representing the district ==
Member	Party	Years	Cong ress	Electoral history
District established March 4, 1833
Humphrey H. Leavitt (Steubenville)	Jacksonian	March 4, 1833 – July 10, 1834	23rd	Redistricted from the 11th district and re-elected in 1832. Resigned to become U.S. District Judge.
Vacant		July 10, 1834 – December 1, 1834	23rd	
Daniel Kilgore (Cadiz)	Jacksonian	December 1, 1834 – March 3, 1837	23rd 24th 25th	Elected to finish Leavitt's term. Re-elected in 1834. Re-elected in 1836. Resigned.
Daniel Kilgore (Cadiz)	Democratic	March 4, 1837 – July 4, 1838	23rd 24th 25th	Elected to finish Leavitt's term. Re-elected in 1834. Re-elected in 1836. Resigned.
Vacant		July 4, 1838 – December 3, 1838	25th	
Henry Swearingen (Smithfield)	Democratic	December 3, 1838 – March 3, 1841	25th 26th	Elected to finish Kilgore's term. Re-elected in 1838. [data missing]
Samuel Stokely (Steubenville)	Whig	March 4, 1841 – March 3, 1843	27th	Elected in 1840. [data missing]
Daniel R. Tilden (Ravenna)	Whig	March 4, 1843 – March 3, 1847	28th 29th	Elected in 1843. Re-elected in 1844. [data missing]
John Crowell (Warren)	Whig	March 4, 1847 – March 3, 1851	30th 31st	Elected in 1846. Re-elected in 1848. [data missing]
Eben Newton (Canfield)	Whig	March 4, 1851 – March 3, 1853	32nd	Elected in 1850. [data missing]
Edward Wade (Cleveland)	Free Soil	March 4, 1853 – March 3, 1855	33rd	Elected in 1852. Re-elected in 1854. Re-elected in 1856. Re-elected in 1858. [data missing]
Edward Wade (Cleveland)	Anti-Nebraska	March 4, 1855 – March 3, 1857	34th	Elected in 1852. Re-elected in 1854. Re-elected in 1856. Re-elected in 1858. [data missing]
Edward Wade (Cleveland)	Republican	March 4, 1857 – March 3, 1861	35th 36th	Elected in 1852. Re-elected in 1854. Re-elected in 1856. Re-elected in 1858. [data missing]
Albert G. Riddle (Cleveland)	Republican	March 4, 1861 – March 3, 1863	37th	Elected in 1860. [data missing]
James A. Garfield (Mentor)	Republican	March 4, 1863 – November 8, 1880	38th 39th 40th 41st 42nd 43rd 44th 45th 46th	Elected in 1862. Re-elected in 1864. Re-elected in 1866. Re-elected in 1868. Re-elected in 1870. Re-elected in 1872. Re-elected in 1874. Re-elected in 1876. Re-elected in 1878. Re-elected in 1880. Retired to run for U.S. President. Resigned to become U.S. President.
Vacant		November 8, 1880 – December 13, 1880	46th	
Ezra B. Taylor (Warren)	Republican	December 13, 1880 – March 3, 1893	46th 47th 48th 49th 50th 51st 52nd	Elected to finish Garfield's term. Re-elected in 1882. Re-elected in 1884. Re-elected in 1886. Re-elected in 1888. Re-elected in 1890. [data missing]
Stephen A. Northway (Jefferson)	Republican	March 4, 1893 – September 8, 1898	53rd 54th 55th	Elected in 1892. Re-elected in 1894. Re-elected in 1896. Died.
Vacant		September 8, 1898 – November 8, 1898	55th	
Charles W. F. Dick (Akron)	Republican	November 8, 1898 – March 23, 1904	55th 56th 57th 58th	Elected to finish Northway's term. Re-elected in 1898. Re-elected in 1900. Re-elected in 1902. Resigned to become U.S. Senator.
Vacant		March 23, 1904 – November 8, 1904	58th	
W. Aubrey Thomas (Niles)	Republican	November 8, 1904 – March 3, 1911	58th 59th 60th 61st	Elected to finish Dick's term. Re-elected in 1904. Re-elected in 1906. Re-elected in 1908. [data missing]
Ellsworth R. Bathrick (Akron)	Democratic	March 4, 1911 – March 3, 1915	62nd 63rd	Elected in 1910. Re-elected in 1912. [data missing]
John G. Cooper (Youngstown)	Republican	March 4, 1915 – January 3, 1937	64th 65th 66th 67th 68th 69th 70th 71st 72nd 73rd 74th	Elected in 1914. Re-elected in 1916. Re-elected in 1918. Re-elected in 1920. Re-elected in 1922. Re-elected in 1924. Re-elected in 1926. Re-elected in 1928. Re-elected in 1930. Re-elected in 1932. Re-elected in 1934. Lost re-election.
Michael J. Kirwan (Youngstown)	Democratic	January 3, 1937 – July 27, 1970	75th 76th 77th 78th 79th 80th 81st 82nd 83rd 84th 85th 86th 87th 88th 89th 90th 91st	Elected in 1936. Re-elected in 1938. Re-elected in 1940. Re-elected in 1942. Re-elected in 1944. Re-elected in 1946. Re-elected in 1948. Re-elected in 1950. Re-elected in 1952. Re-elected in 1954. Re-elected in 1956. Re-elected in 1958. Re-elected in 1960. Re-elected in 1962. Re-elected in 1964. Re-elected in 1966. Re-elected in 1968. Died.
Vacant		July 27, 1970 – November 3, 1970	91st	
Charles J. Carney (Youngstown)	Democratic	November 3, 1970 – January 3, 1979	91st 92nd 93rd 94th 95th	Elected to finish Kirwan's term. Re-elected in 1970. Re-elected in 1972. Re-elected in 1974. Re-elected in 1976. [data missing]
Lyle Williams (Warren)	Republican	January 3, 1979 – January 3, 1983	96th 97th	Elected in 1978. Re-elected in 1980. Redistricted to the 17th district.
Ed Feighan (Lakewood)	Democratic	January 3, 1983 – January 3, 1993	98th 99th 100th 101st 102nd	Elected in 1982. Re-elected in 1984. Re-elected in 1986. Re-elected in 1988. Re-elected in 1990. Retired.
Eric Fingerhut (Mayfield Heights)	Democratic	January 3, 1993 – January 3, 1995	103rd	Elected in 1992. Lost re-election.
Steve LaTourette (Madison)	Republican	January 3, 1995 – January 3, 2003	104th 105th 106th 107th	Elected in 1994. Re-elected in 1996. Re-elected in 1998. Re-elected in 2000. Redistricted to the 14th district.
District dissolved January 3, 2003

== Election results ==
The following chart shows historic election results. Bold type indicates victor. Italic type indicates incumbent.

Year	Democratic	Republican	Other
1832			
…	…	…	…
1920	James Kennedy: 25,250	**John G. Cooper**: 60,147	
1922	W. B. Kilpatrick: 27,836	**John G. Cooper**: 40,492	
1924	Phebe T. Sutliff: 21,926	**John G. Cooper**: 67,581	
1926	James Kennedy: 17,513	**John G. Cooper**: 45,788	
1928	Locke Miller: 40,948	**John G. Cooper**: 89,731	
1930	W. B. Kilpatrick: 40,960	**John G. Cooper**: 53,996	
1932	D. F. Dunlavy: 65,024	**John G. Cooper**: 74,534	John S. Ruth: 166; Harold G. Bickler: 37
1934	Locke Miller: 52,023	**John G. Cooper**: 56,200	Harry K. Collins (S): 769; Joe Dallet (C): 769
1936	Michael J. Kirwan: 93,636	John G. Cooper: 65,926	Joe Dallet (C): 756
1938	**Michael J. Kirwan**: 76,268	William P. Barnum: 69,214	
1940	**Michael J. Kirwan**: 122,075	Charles H. Anderson: 75,016	
1942	**Michael J. Kirwan**: 60,248	James T. Begg: 46,567	
1944	**Michael J. Kirwan**: 120,191	Herschel Hunt: 69,403	
1946	**Michael J. Kirwan**: 88,872	Norman W. Adams: 59,607	
1948	**Michael J. Kirwan**: 134,408	William Bacon: 63,079	
1950	**Michael J. Kirwan**: 119,245	Henry P. Kosling: 67,661	
1952	**Michael J. Kirwan**: 91,074	Allen Russell: 46,202	
1954	**Michael J. Kirwan**: 81,304	David S. Edwards: 33,352	
1956	**Michael J. Kirwan**: 92,924	Ralph E. Turner: 42,293	
1958	**Michael J. Kirwan**: 93,660	Loren E. Van Brocklin: 31,192	
1960	**Michael J. Kirwan**: 102,874	Paul E. Stevens: 46,537	
1962	**Michael J. Kirwan**: 75,967	William Vincent Williams: 46,200	
1964	**Michael J. Kirwan**: 111,682	Albert James: 34,654	
1966	**Michael J. Kirwan**: 86,975	Donald J. Lewis: 34,037	
1968	**Michael J. Kirwan**: 101,813	Donald J. Lewis: 44,363	
1970	**Charles J. Carney**: 73,222	Margaret Dennison: 52,057	
1972	**Charles J. Carney**: 109,979	Normal M. Parr: 61,934	
1974	**Charles J. Carney**: 97,709	James L. Ripple: 36,649	
1976	**Charles J. Carney**: 90,386	Jack C. Hunter: 86,162	Karl T. Untch: 1089; Kenneth Zurbrugg: 2,258
1978	Charles J. Carney: 69,977	Lyle Williams: 71,890	
1980	Harry Meshel: 77,272	**Lyle Williams**: 107,032	
1982	**Edward F. Feighan**: 111,760	Richard G. Anter II: 72,682	Kevin G. Killeen: 2,371; Thomas Pekarek (L): 2,844
1984	**Edward F. Feighan**: 139,605	Matthew J. Hatchadorian: 107,957	Others: 5,277
1986	**Edward F. Feighan**: 97,814	Gary C. Suhadolnik: 80,743	
1988	**Edward F. Feighan**: 168,065	Noel F. Roberts: 70,359	
1990	**Edward F. Feighan**: 132,951	Susan M. Lawko: 72,315	
1992	Eric D. Fingerhut: 138,465	Robert A. Gardner: 124,606	
1994	Eric D. Fingerhut: 89,701	Steven C. LaTourette: 99,997	Ronald E. Young: 11,364; Jerome A. Brentar: 5,180
1996	Thomas J. Coyne Jr.: 101,152	**Steven C. LaTourette**: 135,012	Thomas A. Martin (N): 10,655
1998	Elizabeth Kelley: 64,090	**Steven C. LaTourette**: 126,786	
2000	Dale Virgil Blanchard: 101,842	**Steven C. LaTourette**: 206,639	Sid Stone (L): 10,367
