= John Hutchins (politician) =

American politician

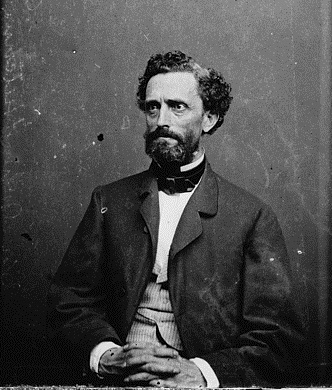

Member of the U.S. House of Representatives from Ohio's 20th district
- In office March 4, 1859 – March 3, 1863
- Preceded by: Joshua Reed Giddings
- Succeeded by: Richard C. Parsons

Member of the Ohio House of Representatives from the Trumbull County district
- In office December 3, 1849 – December 1, 1850 Serving with Albert G. Riddle
- Preceded by: Isaac Lee; Albert G. Riddle
- Succeeded by: M. C. Bradley; G. H. Kent

Personal details
- Born: July 25, 1812 Vienna, Ohio
- Died: November 20, 1891 (aged 79) Cleveland, Ohio
- Resting place: Lake View Cemetery, Cleveland, Ohio, U.S.
- Party: Republican
- Spouse: Rhoda M. Andrews
- Children: five
- Education: Western Reserve College
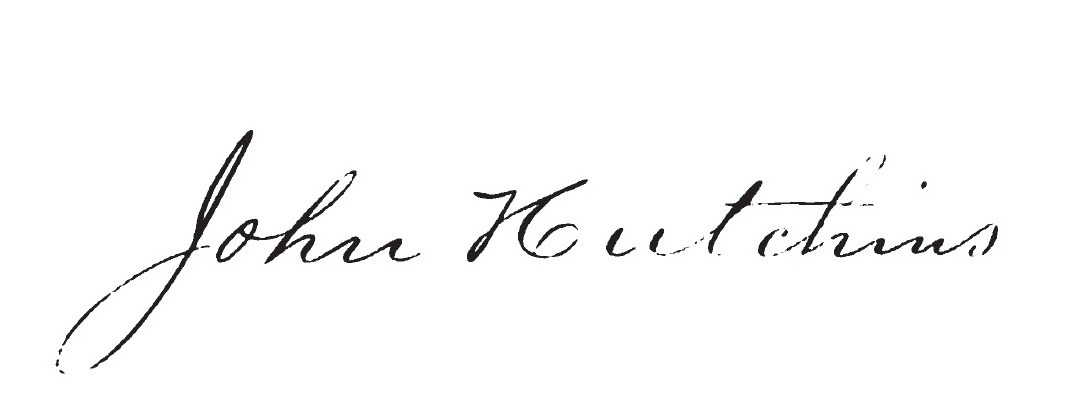
- Signature

John Hutchins (July 25, 1812 – November 20, 1891) was an American lawyer and politician who served two terms as a U.S. representative from Ohio from 1859 to 1863.

== Life and career ==
Hutchins was born in Vienna Township, Trumbull County, Ohio. He was a first cousin of future congressman Wells A. Hutchins. He attended the district schools and Western Reserve College, known now as Case Western Reserve University, in Cleveland, Ohio. He studied law with David Tod, later Ohio Governor.

=== Early career ===
He was admitted to the bar in 1837 and commenced practice in Warren, Ohio.

He served as clerk of the common pleas court for Trumbull County from 1838 to 1843, and was a member of the State house of representatives in 1849 and 1850. He served as the mayor of Warren for two years, and was a member of the Warren Board of Education for six years. He later formed a partnership with Jacob Dolson Cox

=== Congress ===
Hutchins was elected as a Republican to the Thirty-sixth and Thirty-seventh Congresses (March 4, 1859–March 3, 1863). He served as chairman of the Committee on Manufacturers (Thirty-seventh Congress).

He was an unsuccessful candidate for renomination in 1862, and subsequently resumed the practice of law in Warren.

=== Later years and death ===
He moved to Cleveland, Ohio, in 1868 and continued the practice of law. He died there on November 20, 1891, and was interred in Lake View Cemetery.

=== Family ===
He married Rhoda M Andrews in 1838, who died in Cleveland in May, 1890. She had three sons and two daughters, three sons and one daughter survived their parents.

== Sources ==
- United States Congress. "John Hutchins (id: H001008)". Biographical Directory of the United States Congress.

U.S. House of Representatives
| Preceded by Joshua R. Giddings | Member of the U.S. House of Representatives from Ohio's 20th congressional district 1859–1863 | Succeeded by District inactive |
