= 1850 Ohio gubernatorial election =

- October 8, 1850
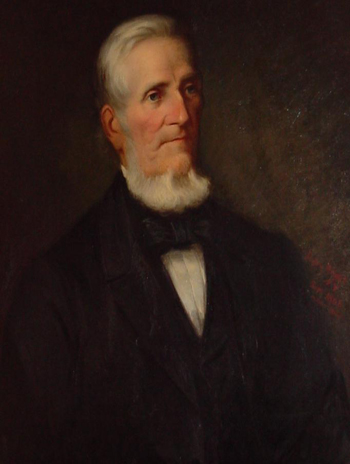

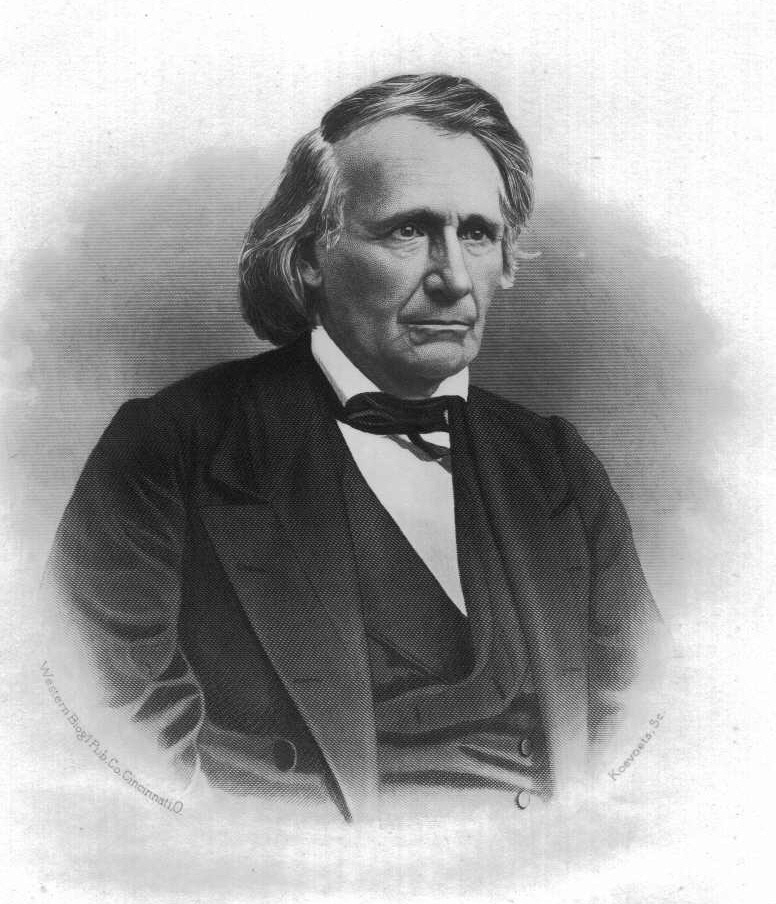

Nominee	Reuben Wood	William Johnston	Edward Smith
Party	Democratic	Whig	Free Soil
Popular vote	133,093	121,105	13,747
Percentage	49.67%	45.20%	5.13%
- Election results by county Wood: 30–40% 40–50% 50–60% 60–70% 70–80% 80–90% Johnston: 40–50% 50–60% 60–70% Smith: 40–50%
Governor before election
Seabury Ford
Whig
Elected Governor
Reuben Wood
Democratic

The 1850 Ohio gubernatorial election was held on October 8, 1850, in order to elect the Governor of Ohio. Democratic nominee and former Justice of the Ohio Supreme Court Reuben Wood defeated Whig nominee and former member of the Ohio House of Representatives William Johnston and Free Soil nominee Edward Smith.

== General election ==
On election day, October 8, 1850, Democratic nominee Reuben Wood won the election by a margin of 11,988 votes against his foremost opponent Whig nominee William Johnston, thereby gaining Democratic control over the office of Governor. Wood was sworn in as the 21st Governor of Ohio on December 12, 1850.

=== Results ===
Ohio gubernatorial election, 1850
Party	Candidate	Votes	%
Democratic	Reuben Wood	133,093	49.67%
Whig	William Johnston	121,105	45.20%
Free Soil	Edward Smith	13,747	5.13%
Total votes		267,945	100.00%
Democratic gain from Whig			
