= Joseph Whitehill =

American politician

Ohio State Treasurer
- In office February 17, 1835 – February 24, 1847
- Governor: Robert Lucas; Joseph Vance; Wilson Shannon; Thomas Corwin; Thomas W. Bartley; Mordecai Bartley; William Bebb
- Preceded by: Henry Brown
- Succeeded by: Albert A. Bliss

Personal details
- Born: December 30, 1786 Lancaster County, Pennsylvania, US
- Died: November 1, 1861 (aged 74) Columbus, Ohio, US
- Resting place: Green Lawn Cemetery

Military service
- Allegiance: United States
- Battles/wars: War of 1812

Joseph Whitehill, Jr. (December 30, 1786 – November 4, 1861) was a nineteenth-century Ohio farmer who was elected to a series of local offices in Warren County, Ohio, before his election as Ohio State Treasurer.

== Biography ==
He was born in Lancaster County, Pennsylvania, the son of Joseph Whitehill. In 1800, at age fourteen, his family moved to Botetourt County, Virginia, near Fincastle. In 1808, his father died and Whitehill assumed responsibility for his family: six sisters and a brother. In the War of 1812, he was lieutenant in the militia company from Botetourt County, and served in the defense of Norfolk, Virginia from the British. Upon the death of the captain of his company, Whitehill was in command.

After the war, the family moved to Warren County, Ohio, north of Cincinnati. They arrived in the county in 1815, initially settling near the town of Waynesville but relocating closer to Lebanon, the county seat. He was forced to abandon farming because of his rheumatism. Moving into the town of Lebanon, he hauled freight between Lebanon and Cincinnati. He also owned a grist mill on the Warren County Canal's Lock 3, southwest of Lebanon.

In 1826, he was elected sheriff of Warren County and served 1826 to 1830, two two-year terms. Whitehill was briefly out of office in 1830, during which time he bought a farm three miles north of Lebanon in Turtlecreek Township. In 1830, he was elected to the Ohio General Assembly as a representative. He was re-elected three times, serving four one-year terms. In 1834, as he was completing his final term in the legislature, he was elected Ohio State Treasurer. He was re-elected three times, serving four three-year terms. When his service expired, he remained in the state capital, Columbus. Whitehill, who never married, lived there with his spinster sister Jane.

Whitehill speculated in property and became quite wealthy, but lost his fortune through the failure of several companies he had invested in. Josiah Morrow, the historian of Warren County, wrote of him:

Mr. Whitehill was not a man of much knowledge of the sort that is derived from books, he having had but little time for the acquisition of that kind of knowledge in his early life, which was one of labor and activity, rendered necessary by reason of the responsibilities imposed upon him . . . . But he was a man of strong sense and sound judgement. His disposition was frank and generous, and his manners were popular. He enjoyed in an eminent degree the affection of his relatives and friends, and the respect and esteem of his acquaintances.

Whitehill died in Columbus at age 74. Both he and his sister Jane are buried at Green Lawn Cemetery in Columbus. Cemetery records indicate he died November 1, 1861.

Ohio House of Representatives
Preceded by Thomas Corwin; Jeremiah Morrow	Representative from Warren County; December 6, 1830-December 3, 1832; Served alongside: J. Hallack	Succeeded by Joseph Mitchell
Preceded by John Bigger; Benjamin Baldwin	Representative from Warren County; December 1, 1834-February 16, 1835; Served alongside: Thomas Ross	Succeeded by Jeremiah Morrow; John Hunt
Political offices
Preceded by Henry Brown	Ohio State Treasurer; February 17, 1835-February 24, 1847	Succeeded by Albert A. Bliss
