= 1848 Ohio gubernatorial election =

- October 10, 1848
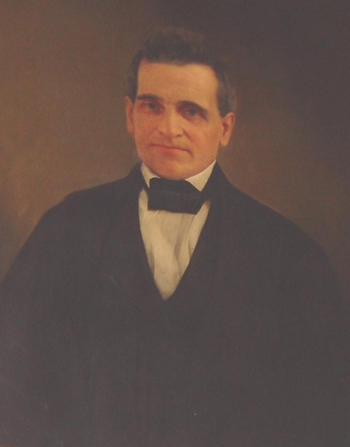

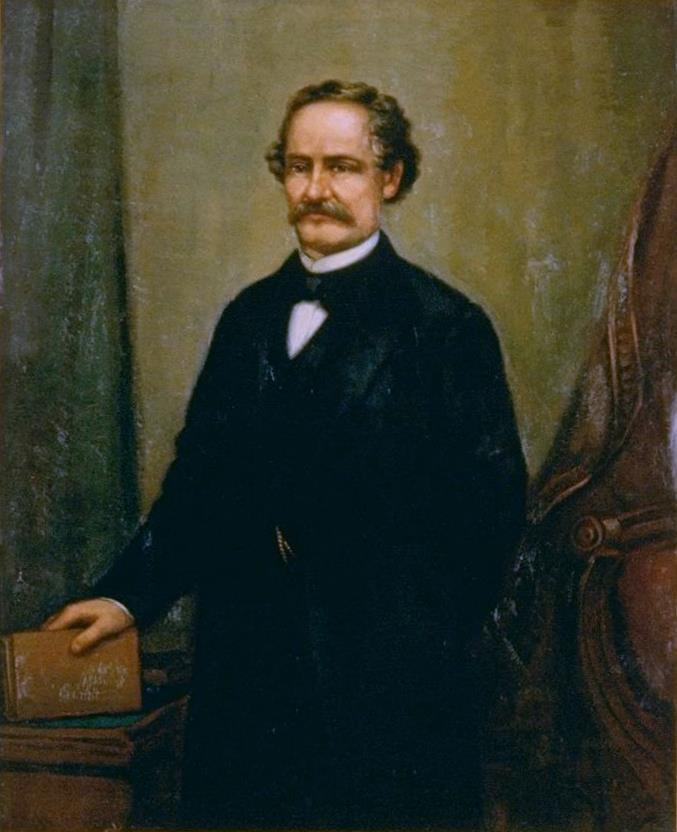
Nominee	Seabury Ford	John B. Weller
Party	Whig	Democratic
Popular vote	148,756	148,445
Percentage	49.93%	49.82%
- Election results by county Ford: 50–60% 60–70% 70–80% Weller: 50–60% 60–70% 70–80% No Data/Vote
Governor before election
William Bebb
Whig
Elected Governor
Seabury Ford
Whig

The 1848 Ohio gubernatorial election was held on October 10, 1848, in order to elect the Governor of Ohio. Whig nominee and former member of the Ohio Senate Seabury Ford narrowly defeated Democratic nominee and former member of the U.S. House of Representatives from Ohio's 2nd district John B. Weller.

Weller would be elected Governor of California in 1857.

== General election ==
On election day, October 10, 1848, Whig nominee Seabury Ford won the election by a margin of 311 votes against his opponent Democratic nominee John B. Weller, thereby retaining Whig control over the office of Governor. Ford was sworn in as the 20th Governor of Ohio on January 22, 1849.

=== Results ===
Ohio gubernatorial election, 1848
Party	Candidate	Votes	%
Whig	Seabury Ford	148,756	49.93%
Democratic	John B. Weller	148,445	49.82%
	Scattering	742	0.25%
Total votes		297,943	100.00%
Whig hold			
