= Albert A. Bliss =

American politician

Albert Asahel Bliss

Ohio State Treasurer
- In office February 28, 1847 – January 12, 1852
- Governor: William Bebb; Seabury Ford; Reuben Wood
- Preceded by: Joseph Whitehill
- Succeeded by: John G. Breslin

Member of the Ohio House of Representatives from the Lorain County district
- In office December 2, 1839 – December 4, 1842
- Preceded by: William Andrews
- Succeeded by: Richard Warner

Personal details
- Born: March 25, 1812 Canton, Connecticut
- Died: May 14, 1893 (aged 81) Leoni, Michigan
- Party: Whig; Republican
- Spouse: Almira Beebe
- Children: five
- Education: Oneida Institute

Albert Asahel Bliss (25 March 1812 – 14 May 1893) was a Whig politician from the U.S. State of Ohio. He served in the Ohio House of Representatives and was the Ohio State Treasurer for five years.

== Biography ==
Albert A. Bliss was born March 25, 1812, at Canton, Connecticut. He was the son of Asahel Bliss and Lydia Griswold. His younger brother was Philemon Bliss. At age fourteen, he attended the Oneida Institute at Whitestown, New York, where he learned the trades of chairmaking and house and sign painting. He worked at his trade, and saved money to go west.

Bliss arrived at Elyria, Ohio, in 1833, where he studied law at the office of Whittlesey and Hamlin, and edited the Ohio Atlas. He was admitted to the bar in September, 1835 in Cleveland, Ohio. He removed to Cleveland, where he worked as a lawyer, and edited the Daily Gazette.

Bliss returned to Elyria in 1837, and practiced for ten years. He was elected to the Ohio House of Representatives for three terms, as a Whig. He was elected by the legislature as Ohio State Treasurer early in 1847 to a three-year term. He was re-elected in 1850. In 1851, Ohio voters adopted a new constitution, which made treasurer a two-year term elected by voters. In the 1851 election, Bliss lost to his Democratic opponent, John G. Breslin. Bliss served until the second Monday in January, 1852.

Bliss returned to Elyria late in 1852, where he remained until 1863. In 1857, Bliss's successor was accused of embezzling large sums from the treasury, and accused Bliss of similar crimes. Bliss managed to defend himself and avoid punishment. He moved to Jackson, Michigan, in 1863, and was appointed by Governor Bagley as an inspector of the Jackson State Prison. Three years later, he was elected to the School Board. He was the Republican candidate for probate judge in 1876, and was defeated by only 45 votes.

== Family ==
Albert Bliss was married at Elyria, December 30, 1835, to Almira J. Beebe, originally from Whitestown, New York. They had five children. He died at Leoni, Michigan, on May 14, 1893.

Political offices
Preceded by Joseph Whitehill	Treasurer of Ohio; 1847–1852	Succeeded by John G. Breslin
