= William Harvey Gibson =

American politician

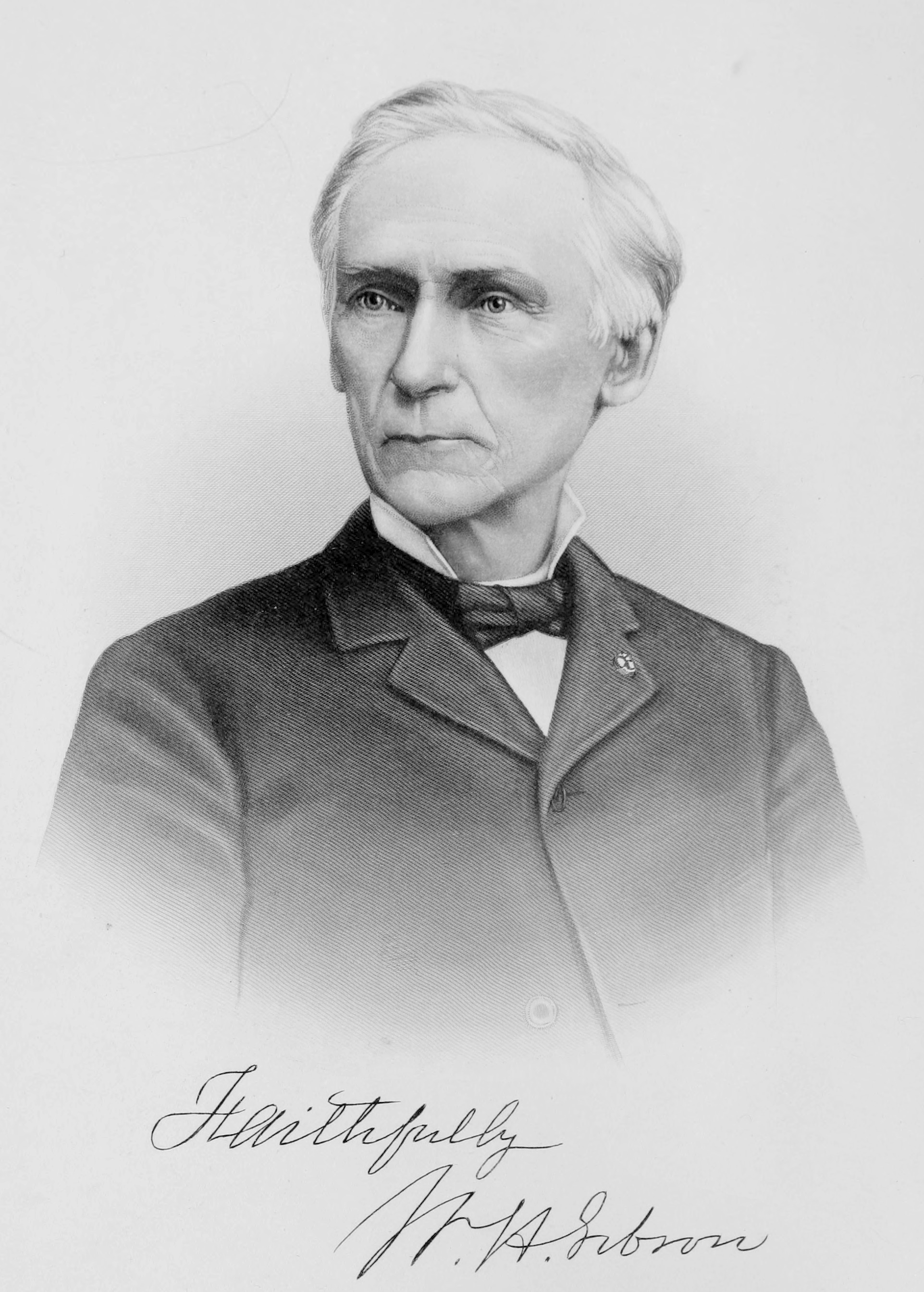
- circa 1879

Ohio State Treasurer
- In office January 14, 1856 – June 13, 1857
- Governor: Salmon P. Chase
- Preceded by: John G. Breslin
- Succeeded by: Alfred P. Stone

Personal details
- Born: May 16, 1821 Cross Creek Township, Ohio, US
- Died: November 22, 1894 (aged 73) Tiffin, Ohio, US
- Resting place: Greenlawn Cemetery, Tiffin
- Party: Republican
- Spouse: Martha Matilda Creeger
- Relatives: Descendants of Robert Coe
- Education: Ashland College

Military service
- Allegiance: United States
- Branch/service: Union Army
- Years of service: July 31, 1861 - September 5, 1864
- Rank: Colonel; Brevet Brigadier General
- Unit: 49th Ohio Infantry; Horn Brigade
- Battles/wars: Battle of Shiloh; Siege of Corinth; Battle of Stones River; Tullahoma Campaign; Battle of Chickamauga; Battle of Missionary Ridge; Atlanta campaign Battle of Resaca; Battle of Pickett's Mill; Battle of Kennesaw Mountain; Siege of Atlanta; Battle of Jonesboro; Second Battle of Franklin; Battle of Nashville

Brigadier General William Harvey Gibson (May 16, 1821 – November 22, 1894) was a Republican politician from Ohio. He resigned from the Ohio State Treasurer's office in disgrace after failing to report his predecessor for theft, but redeemed his reputation in war. He was brevetted Brigadier General of the Union Army's 49th Ohio Volunteer Infantry during the American Civil War.

== Early life ==
William Harvey Gibson was born at Cross Creek Township, Jefferson County, Ohio on May 16, 1821, to John Gibson (1778–1852) and Jeannette Gibson (née Coe) (1782–1850). He was raised in a family that valued hard work, plain dress, temperance and sympathy for the unfortunate and opposed slavery and "social gilded livery." The Gibson family also placed special attention on developing good oratory and debating skills and held a regular family debating circle during the long winter evenings.

On his mother's side, Gibson was descended from Robert Coe who arrived in the Massachusetts Bay Colony in 1634 aboard the ship the Francis. On his father's side, he was of Scotch-Irish descent, the grandson of Colonel John Gibson, commanding officer of Virginia's 7th Regiment during the American Revolutionary War, Secretary of the Territory of Indiana (1800–1810), and Acting Governor of Indiana (1811–1813).

William Harvey Gibson was known to everyone except his mother as "Bill." He was the tenth of 11 children. He had five brothers and five older sisters (Sally, Polly, Hetty, Patty, Eliza, Robert McDowell, Moses Coe, John Kendall, Benjamin, and James Allen). Gibson's father purchased 320 acres from the Federal Government in Seneca County, Ohio in 1821. When he was only four months old, the Gibson family moved to Seneca County from Jefferson County. The family settled in Melmore, Ohio. At the time, it was still a wooded frontier and home to Seneca and Mohawk Indians. Both sides of the family were Presbyterians and Gibson recalls being baptized with ten Indian children by Rev. James B. Findley with the ceremony being translated by the Indian interpreter "Black Jack." Gibson also recalls hearing Chief "Grey Eyes" preach. In the 1820s, the Gibson brothers took their corn for milling at the mill that the U.S. government built for the Wyandotte Indians on the Upper Sandusky River.

Gibson attended the first school organized in Seneca County, Ohio in 1826 with his brothers Robert, Benjamin and James Allen. It was located in the second room of James Latham's log cabin and the teacher was Mrs. Laura Latham. The Lathams later donated land and asked the community to help build a one-room log schoolhouse, which became known as Craw's Hill School. It was run by Headmaster Edward Ranger. Among Gibson's early schoolmates were Anson Burlingame (diplomat), Consul Wilshire Butterfield (author and historian), O. D. Conger (U.S. Congressman and U.S. Senator from Michigan), and Charles Foster (35th Governor of Ohio and U.S. Secretary of the Treasury).

In his late teens, Gibson was eager to explore the American West. Together with his brother Robert McDowell Gibson and his neighbors John Kennedy and James Downs, he formed an exploration party that traveled west to explore the Territory of Iowa. The trip was a disaster with Kennedy and Downs dying by the time they reached Iowa City. The Gibson brothers returned to Melmore, Ohio. It would be their youngest brother James Allen Gibson who would explore the West and settle in Kansas.

Bill and his brother Robert McDowell Gibson (who would later become a practicing M.D.), enrolled in Ashland Academy in Richland County, Ohio in 1841. (The school later became Ashland University and Ashland Theological Seminary). Here, he honed his debating and oratory skills, becoming known for his strong position on temperance. He learned the carpenters trade, and studied law.

== Early Legal and Political career ==
In 1841 when William Harvey Gibson petitioned the law firm of Rawson & Pennington to join their firm, he was following in the steps of his older brother John Kendall Gibson who had studied law at Washington & Jefferson College and during the U.S. Presidential campaign of 1840, campaigned alongside General William Henry Harrison. Bill (William Harvey) Gibson and Warren P. Noble (later a prosecuting attorney, judge and U.S. Congressman) studied law together under Abel Rawson. Gibson was admitted to the Ohio bar and his first case was defending a client against racial slurs before Judge Reuben Wood.

Gibson became involved in politics as a member of the Whig Party with strong anti-slavery views. During the U.S. Presidential campaign of 1844, he gave stump speeches for Henry Clay due to the Whig Party's platform that opposed admitting Texas into the Union because it was a slave state. In the U.S. Presidential campaign of 1848, Gibson supported Whig candidate, "Rough and Ready" General Zachary Taylor. However, he was concerned about the Whig Party's lack of opposition to the abolition of slavery and personally visited Henry Clay at his home in Ashland, Kentucky in 1848 to discuss this issue. He lost as a Whig candidate for Ohio Attorney General in 1853. In 1853, following the large defeat of the Whig candidate General Winfield Scott in the U.S. Presidential election of 1852, Gibson threw his support to the Free Soil Party and began organizing what would become the Republican Party in Ohio. He attended the first organization meeting of the Republican Party in spring of 1856 in Pittsburgh. He was one of the 69 Ohio delegates (of a total 600 delegates from around the country) that attended the first Republican National Convention held in Philadelphia in June 1856. In 1856, he ran and was elected as the first Republican to hold the office of Ohio State Treasurer.

== State Treasurer ==
In 1855, Gibson ran for Ohio State Treasurer, defeating the incumbent Democrat, John G. Breslin. Breslin was a fellow Tiffin resident, and was related by marriage to Gibson. Gibson was inducted into the office January 14, 1856, and resigned June 13, 1857. Gibson found that the treasury was short several hundred thousand dollars when he entered office. He confronted Breslin, who assured him that the money would be made good. Breslin noted that his predecessor, Albert A. Bliss had been $65,000 short, and had made it up. He intended to do the same. When the Breslin Treasury Defalcation became public, Gibson was forced to resign. An indignation meeting of leading politicians in the streets of Columbus denounced Breslin and Gibson. A commission appointed to investigate found Gibson's crime was not in taking money for himself, but in participating in a cover-up. Breslin had moved to Canada to avoid prosecution, and Gibson returned to Tiffin and opened a law office.

== Civil War General, Commander of the Union Army's 49th Ohio Volunteer Infantry ==
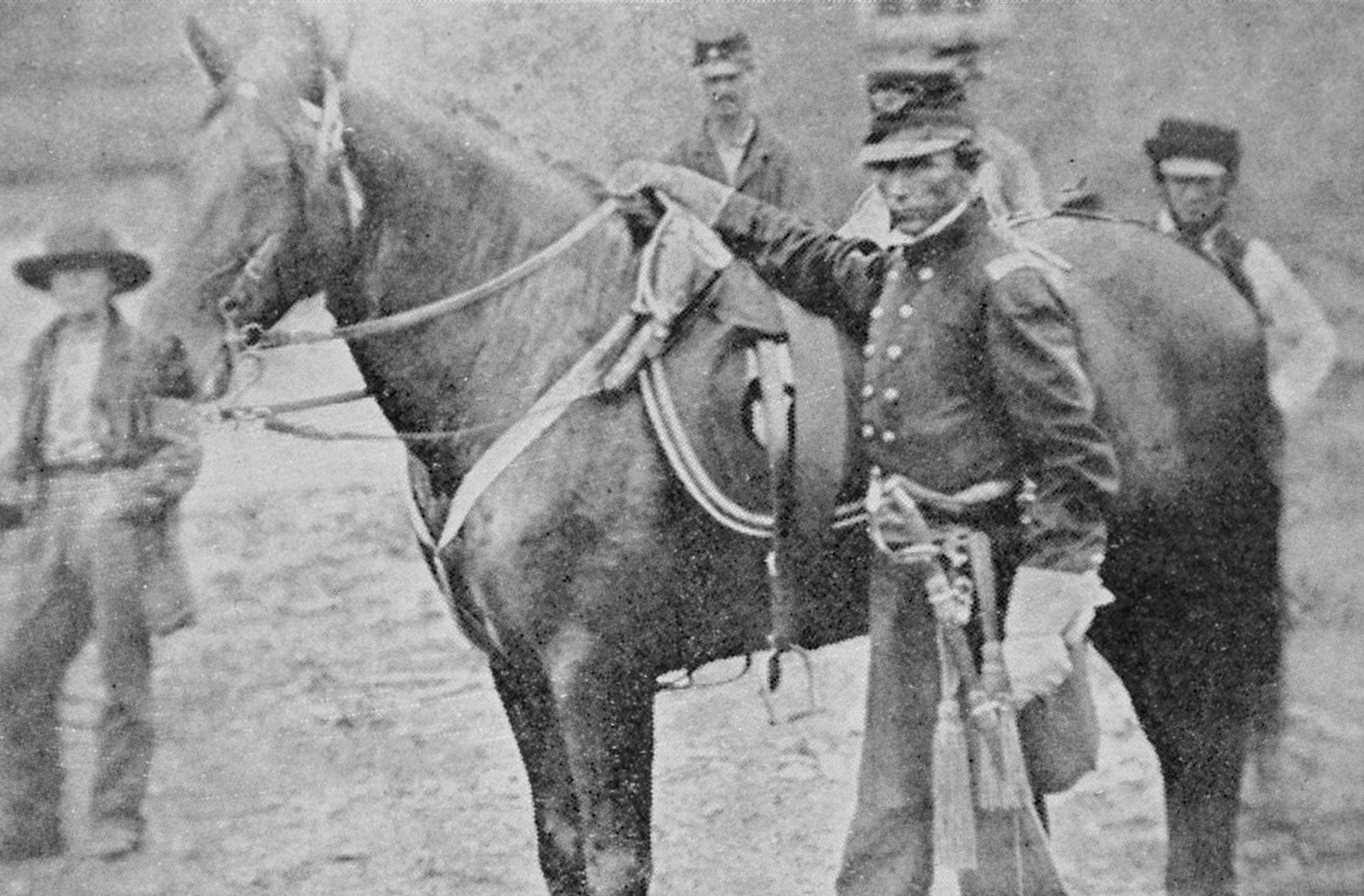
Colonel Gibson with horse later shot from under him

On July 25, 1861, Gibson had a large recruiting poster printed:

TO ARMS! TO ARMS!

Rally to our flag! Rush to the Field!

Are we cowards that must yield to traitors? Are we worthy sons of heroic sires? Let us march, as our forefathers marched, to defend the only democratic Republic on earth!

Impelled by the events of the past week, and assured from Washington that a regiment will be accepted, if enrolled and tendered, I have resolved to organize THE BUCKEYE GUARDS, in northern Ohio.

Let us as patriotic citizens, of adjoining counties, form a regiment that shall be an honor to the State, the exploits of which, in defense of constitutional liberty, shall be recounted with pride by ourselves and our children. The command of the heroic Steedman was organized in this way, and now, at the close of three months' service, they return crowned with glory, to receive the homage of a grateful country.

— W. H. Gibson

Gibson entered service July 31, 1861, and by August 31 was named Colonel of the Forty-Ninth Regiment, Ohio Volunteer Infantry. Gibson was the 49th Ohio Infantry's commanding officer throughout the U.S. Civil War. In August and September 1861, he organized and trained the 49th Ohio Infantry at Camp Noble, near his home in Tiffin, Ohio. With Gibson in command, the regiment was mustered for three years and fought at 42 Civil War battles including: the Battle of Shiloh, the Siege of Corinth, the Battle of Stones River, the Tullahoma Campaign, the Battle of Chickamauga, the Battle of Missionary Ridge, the Atlanta campaign, the Battle of Resaca, the Battle of Kennesaw Mountain, the Siege of Atlanta, the Battle of Jonesboro, the Second Battle of Franklin, and the Battle of Nashville.

Gibson was known amongst his soldiers for his leadership, his positive speeches, and willingness to personally command in battle. At the Battle of Shiloh he had three horses shot from under him and was wounded by bayonet. Gibson was mustered out September 5, 1864, and brevetted Brigadier General March 13, 1865.

Whitelaw Reid summarized Gibson's service in the American Civil War thusly:

He entered the service under a cloud, having been Treasurer of the State of Ohio, and been ejected from his office by Governor Chase for a defalcation of nearly three quarters of a million dollars. His fault was not in taking the money, but in concealing the fact that it had been taken, before his entrance into office, by his predecessor and relative, Mr. Breslin. General sympathy was felt for him, and it was felt that his entry into the military service was a manly effort to wipe out the stigma which weakness, rather than intentional guilt had placed on him. His career did this, and gave him an honored name among the soldiers of the state.

— Whitelaw Reid, 1895

In his home town of Tiffin, Ohio Gibson is commemorated for his leadership during the U.S. Civil with a bronze statue known as the William Harvey Gibson Monument, located on the grounds of the Seneca County Courthouse. Funding for this statue came from state funds and also from donations made by his soldiers.

== After the Civil War ==
Following the Civil War, General Gibson returned to civilian life to practice law. In 1868, Gibson was nominated for Ohio's 9th congressional district, but lost to Democrat Edward F. Dickinson, with his biographer alleging voting fraud. In 1871, he laid out the town of Gibsonburg in Sandusky County, Ohio. He continued as active stump speaker in support of Republican candidates. In the 1880s, Gibson was made a preacher of the Methodist Episcopal Church, and was appointed Ohio Adjutant General by Governor Foster. In 1887, Ohio Governor Joseph B. Foraker appointed him to the Ohio Canal Commission.

== Legacy ==
William Harvey Gibson is best remembered for his eloquent oratory during a difficult period in U.S. history. Abolitionist Harriet Beecher Stowe said that she had "listened to many of the most gifted orators of Europe and America, but have never listened to such eloquence as poured forth for two hours and half as from the lips of William H. Gibson, of Ohio." At Gibson's funeral in 1894, William McKinley, who at the time was Governor of Ohio (1892–1896, and later U.S. president, 1897–1901) made the eulogy. McKinley also noted Gibson's gift for oratory saying that,

For fifty years, Gibson has been the most attractive and sought after of public speakers. On the lecture platform, at hundreds of Grand Army camp-fires, and in the pulpit, wherever duty called him, General Gibson made fitting responses. ... I am here, to pay tribute to the man I loved so much. The last time I heard him was at Old Fort, the Sunday before Memorial day. He was never more eloquent. General Gibson believed the two most important things in life were piety and patriotism. In his creed they were linked in indissoluble union. His piety was broad enough to include every creed and his patriotism wide enough to cover the whole country.

He was interred in Greenlawn Cemetery in Tiffin, Ohio.

On May 25, 1847, Gibson was married in the Presbyterian Church to Martha Matilda Creeger of Tiffin, Ohio, who was born in Maryland.

== Notes ==
Political offices
Preceded by John G. Breslin	Treasurer of Ohio; 1856–1857	Succeeded by Alfred P. Stone
