= Senator Bartley =

Senator Bartley may refer to:

- Mordecai Bartley (1783–1870), Ohio State Senate
- Thomas W. Bartley (1812–1885), Ohio State Senate
