= Governor Bartley =

Governor Bartley may refer to:

- Mordecai Bartley (1783–1870), 18th Governor of Ohio
- Thomas W. Bartley (1812–1885), 17th Governor of Ohio
