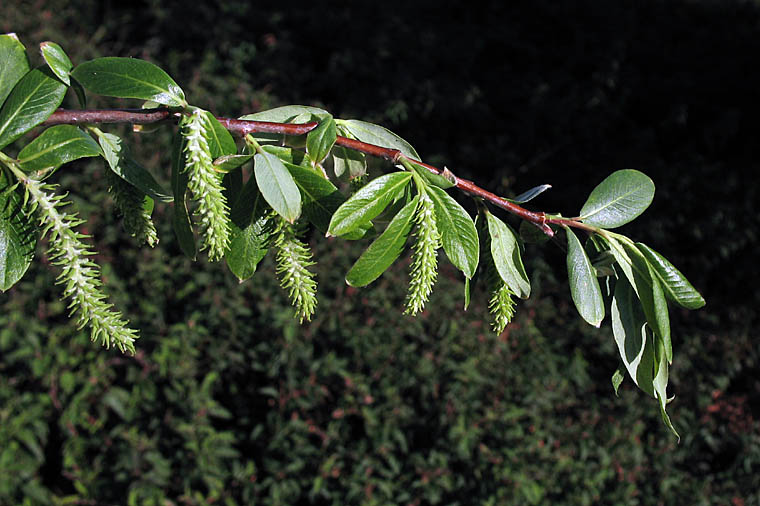

Conservation status
- Least Concern (IUCN 3.1)

- Secure (NatureServe)

Scientific classification
- Kingdom: Plantae
- Clade: Tracheophytes
- Clade: Angiosperms
- Clade: Eudicots
- Clade: Rosids
- Order: Malpighiales
- Family: Salicaceae
- Genus: Salix
- Species: S. laevigata

Binomial name
- Salix laevigata Bebb
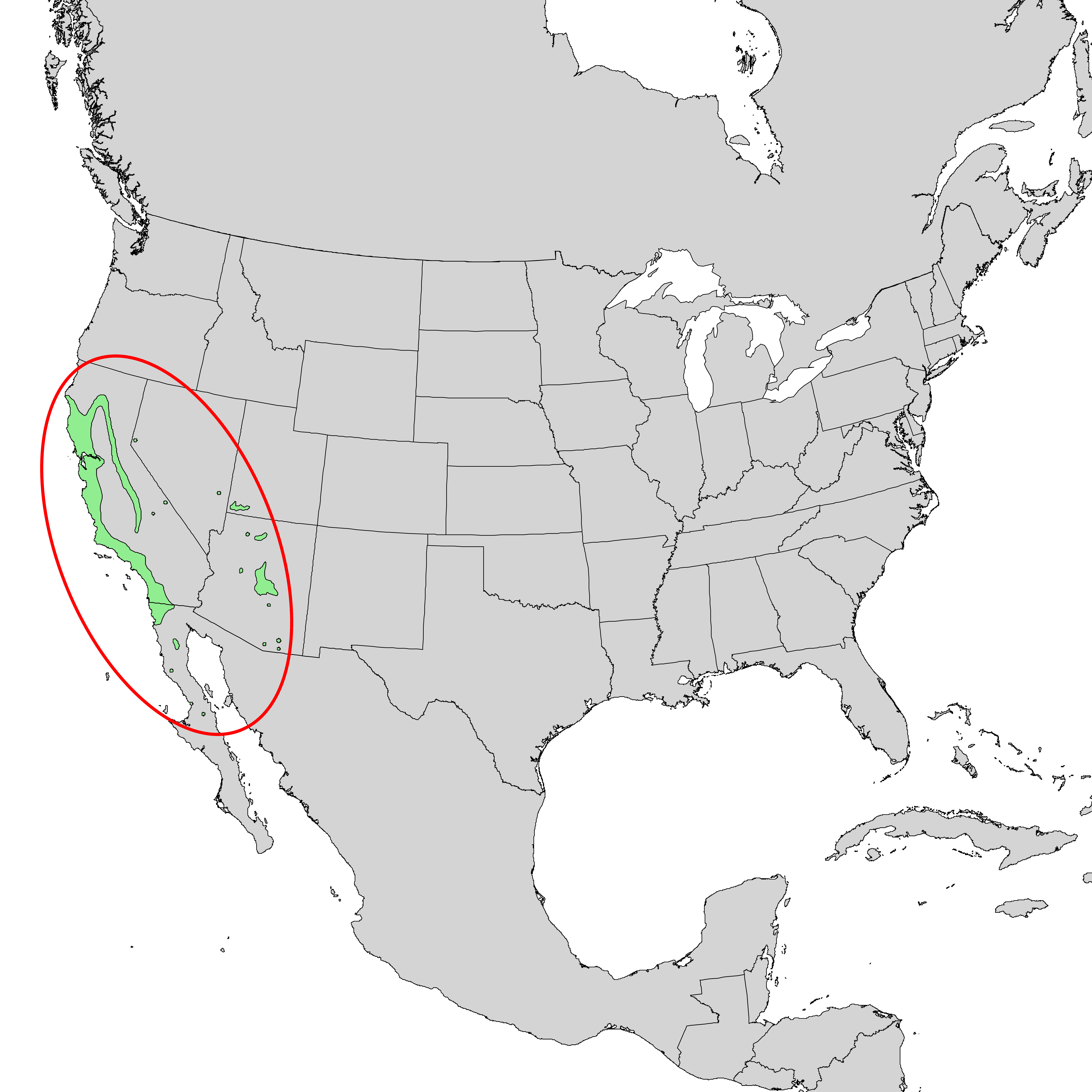
- Natural range of Salix laevigata
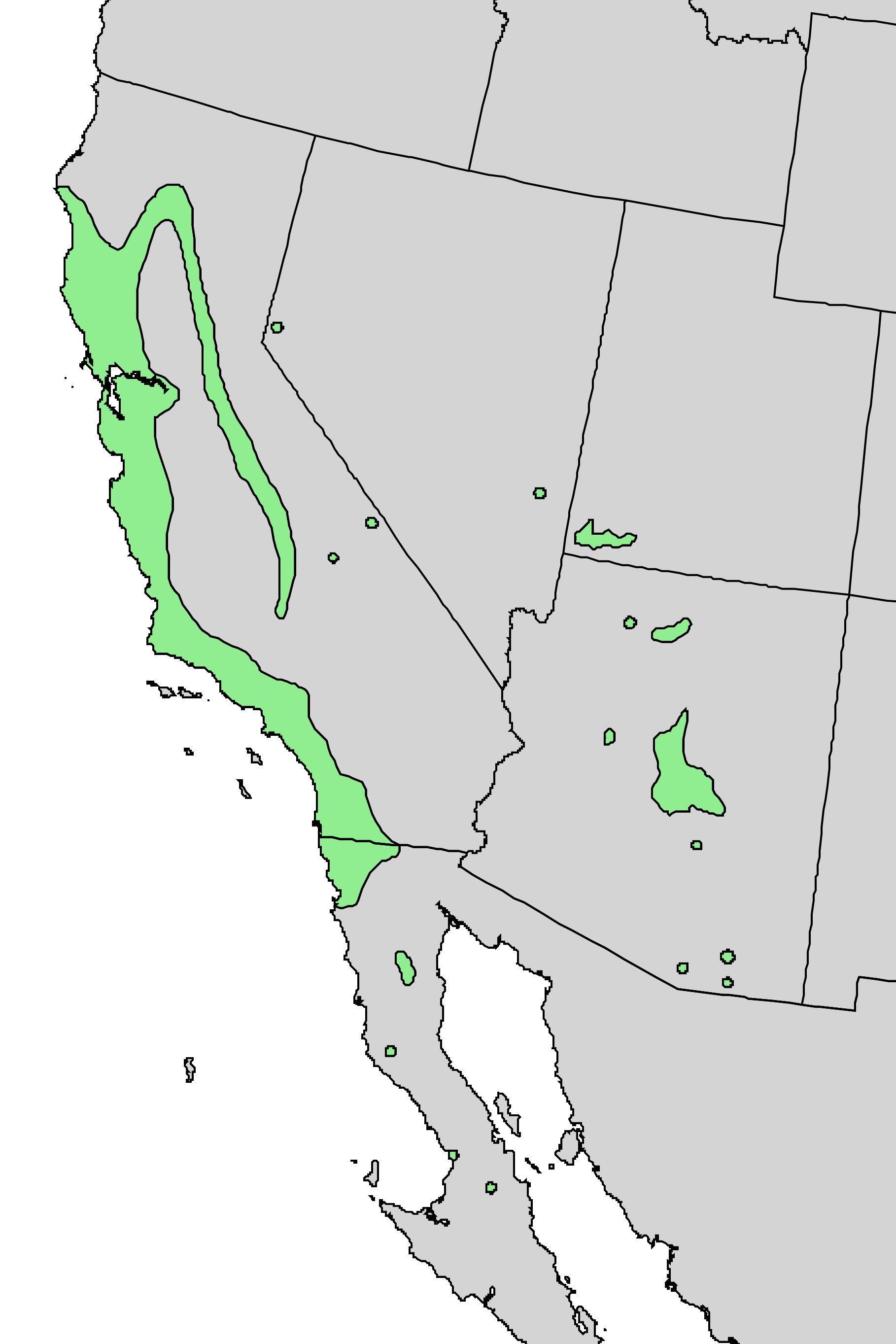
- Close-up of natural range of Salix laevigata

= Salix laevigata =

Species of willow

Salix laevigata, the red willow or polished willow, is a species of willow native to the southwestern United States and northern Baja California.

== Description ==
The red willow is a small tree up to 45 ft (14 m) in height. Like most other willows, it commonly grows along riverbanks and in other areas with high soil moisture. The bark is ridged and grayish, though it sometimes turns reddish with age. Its form is variable, but it will often grow from multiple winding trunks, some more or less straight up, and some growing out far away from the base, even horizontally, and laying along the creek bottom before growing upwards again. Twigs are reddish and flexible when young. Leaves are 3–4 inches (7.6–10.2 cm) long, lanceolate and shiny green on top, dull whitish green underneath. This tree is mostly deciduous during the winter, but can start growing back leaves early during warm snaps in the winter. Yellow flowers grow in drooping catkins. In female red willows, the catkins turn into tufts of cottony seeds, which are windborn, often in large quantities, for 2-3 weeks in the spring. Flowering Time: Dec--Jun

== Taxonomy ==
=== Etymology ===
Salix is the Latin name for "willow".

Laevigata means "smooth", "polished", or "not rough".

== Distribution ==
The red willow occurs along the coast of Baja California and in California north to Cape Mendocino. It occurs east of the San Joaquin Valley in the lower elevation western foothills of the Sierra Nevada; it is absent from the Central Valley itself. Small occurrences can be found in Oregon, Nevada, and New Mexico. In Arizona it is found in the central transition zone of the Mogollon Rim and in the central Grand Canyon. Its distribution extends to the Virgin River canyon of southwestern Utah.

== Uses ==
=== Basketry ===
The Kutenai called red willow mukwuʔk, and used it in basketry. Chumash people also used this species in basketry, particularly for the open-twined openwork baskets called chiquihuites; the Chumash also used fine willow sticks to make seed beaters. In central California, many weavers considered the wood of this species to be too large-pitched, branching, and brittle for basketmaking.

=== Bark and bast fiber ===
The Chumash processed the bark into a soft fiber which was used to make a variety of articles. The bark would be harvested in March, when the sap was flowing and it was easier to pull. A horizontal cut was made at the lower end and the bark would be pulled in long strips. Within a day after harvesting the bark would be pounded or mashed, there are contradictory reports as to whether the bark was soaked in hot water or not, and the bark would be allowed to dry. After drying, the outer bark would be removed by rubbing the material in their hands, leaving a soft and functional bast fiber.

==== Chumash clothing ====
The shredded bast fiber and bark was used to make cordage and clothing. Three strands of the fiber were woven or braided to make at least two kinds of belts worn by men: a 3/4-inch wide game-carrying belt wrapped two or three times around the waist which was worn by hunters, and a 3-inch-wide belt worn by men with their loincloths. The fiber was used to make the apron skirts and wrap skirts worn by women of poorer classes which could also be made of cottonwood bast fiber or tule. The willow skirts were made from lengths of either loosely twisted two-ply cordage or softened strips of untwisted bark. These lengths were hung from a wide woven cordage belt and twined or woven at the top with the same kind of cordage, hanging loose like fringe nearly to the knees.

A prominent use of the willow bark is in the headdress for the Fox dance, which could have a long tail made from braided willow bark or tule and was weighed down with a stone.

Sandals were made by doubling strips of the bark repeatedly, laying them side-by-side, and sewing them together; these sandals would be finished by sewing a grass covering to the top and attaching strings as straps.

==== Tools ====
Willow bark was woven into bags and nets, especially the net bags used to collect islay cherries or acorns. Willow cordage and bast fiber was also used to make fishnets, hunting slings, tumplines, carrying rings, tarring brushes, arrow quivers, and saddle pads.

=== Wood ===
Chumash consultants reported that the wood of this species was used to make small tools like spoons, digging sticks, and possibly bowls. Willow wood was also one of the materials that could be used to make the balls used in one version of the hoop-and-pole game.

=== Medicinal ===
Ohlone people used the bark to make a fever remedy.

== Culture ==
Chumash elder Fernando Librado recalled that Ventureño-Chumash people used to take willow chiquihuite baskets to Los Angeles, where they sold them for a dollar a piece.
