= Senator Avery =

Senator Avery may refer to:

- Bill Avery (born 1942), Nebraska State Senate
- Edward Avery (judge) (1790–1866), Ohio State Senate
- Elroy M. Avery (1844–1935), Ohio State Senate
- Frank Avery (1830–1919), Wisconsin State Senate
- Michael T. Avery (1952–2023), Nebraska State Senate
- Waightstill Avery (1741–1821), North Carolina State Senate
- William Waightstill Avery (1816–1864), North Carolina State Senate
