= John G. Breslin =

American politician

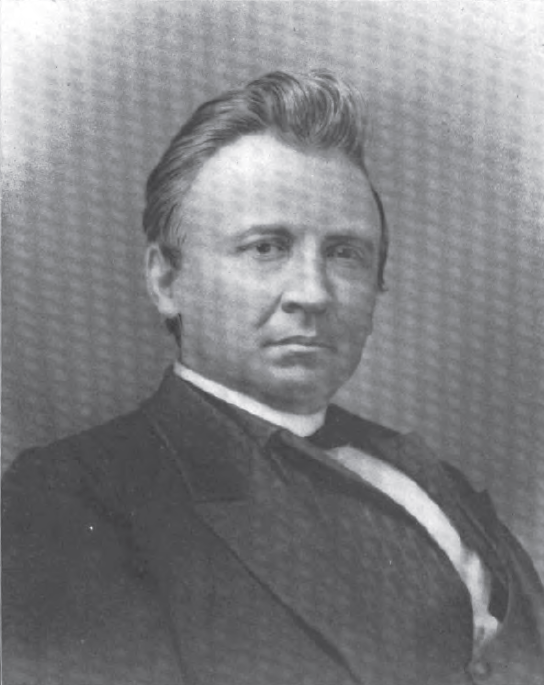

Ohio State Treasurer
- In office January 12, 1852 – January 14, 1856
- Governor: Reuben Wood; William Medill
- Preceded by: Albert A. Bliss
- Succeeded by: William H. Gibson

Member of the Ohio House of Representatives from the Seneca County district
- In office December 4, 1848 – December 1, 1850
- Preceded by: Warren P. Noble
- Succeeded by: Jacob Decker

Personal details
- Born: 1824 Lebanon, Pennsylvania, US
- Died: February 22, 1889 (aged 64–65) Huntington, West Virginia, US
- Party: Democratic
- Spouse: Anna C. Borland

John G. Breslin (1824-1889) was a Democratic politician from the U.S. State of Ohio. He was elected to the Ohio House of Representatives, and was Speaker at age 24. He later was Ohio State Treasurer and in the railroad business.

== Biography ==
Breslin was born at Lebanon, Pennsylvania in about 1824. Both his parents died when he was about three years old, and he was adopted by a family named McKissen. They moved to Dayton, Ohio when John was a boy, and he decided to make his own way at age 12.

At age 12, Breslin walked to Columbus, Ohio, where he hired on as a printers apprentice to Samuel Medary, editor of the Columbus Statesman, a Democratic paper. He applied his time to work and study for six years. In 1842, Colonel Medary received a letter from Democrats in Tiffin, Ohio, asking him to recommend a young man to edit a Democratic paper in their city, and Medary recommended Breslin. Breslin published the first edition of the Seneca Advertiser May 6, 1842, and he continued with the paper until 1854.

Breslin was elected to the Ohio House of Representatives in 1848, and was re-elected in 1849. In 1848 he was selected by his peers as Speaker of the House at age 24.

In 1851, Ohio adopted a new constitution. The office of Ohio State Treasurer became elective, and Breslin ran against the Whig incumbent Albert A. Bliss, and won office.

While Breslin was Treasurer in Columbus, he met and married Anna C. Borland of Lancaster, Ohio. He was re-elected in 1853, but lost to Republican William H. Gibson in 1855 while seeking a third term. Gibson was a fellow Tiffin resident, and was related by marriage to Breslin. Breslin served until the second Monday of January, 1856, and then moved back to Tiffin.

In June, 1857, Gibson was forced to resign, when it became public that Breslin had left the Treasury several hundred thousand dollars short at the end of his term. Breslin assured Gibson the money would be made good. Gibson was found guilty of nothing more than being too trusting. Breslin removed to Canada to avoid the unpleasantness.

After residing in Lancaster, Ohio for a year and a half, Breslin and his wife moved to Huntington, West Virginia in 1871, where he was general ticket agent for the Chesapeake and Ohio Railway. He worked there until his death February 22, 1889.

Ohio House of Representatives
Preceded by Joseph S. Hawkins	Speaker of the Ohio House; 1848–1849	Succeeded by Benjamin F. Leiter
Political offices
Preceded by Albert A. Bliss	Treasurer of Ohio; 1852–1856	Succeeded by William Harvey Gibson
