= 1859 Ohio gubernatorial election =

- October 11, 1859
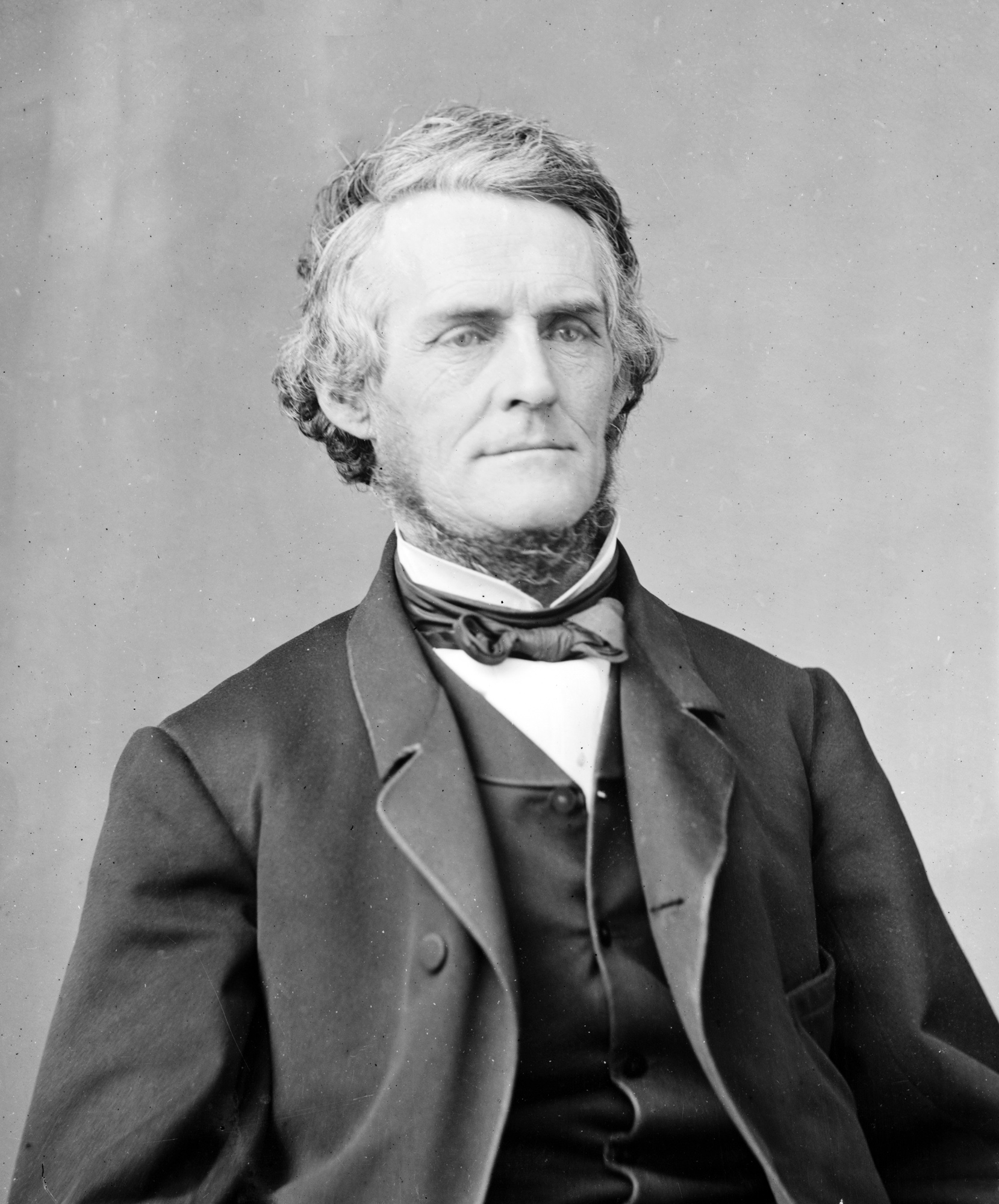

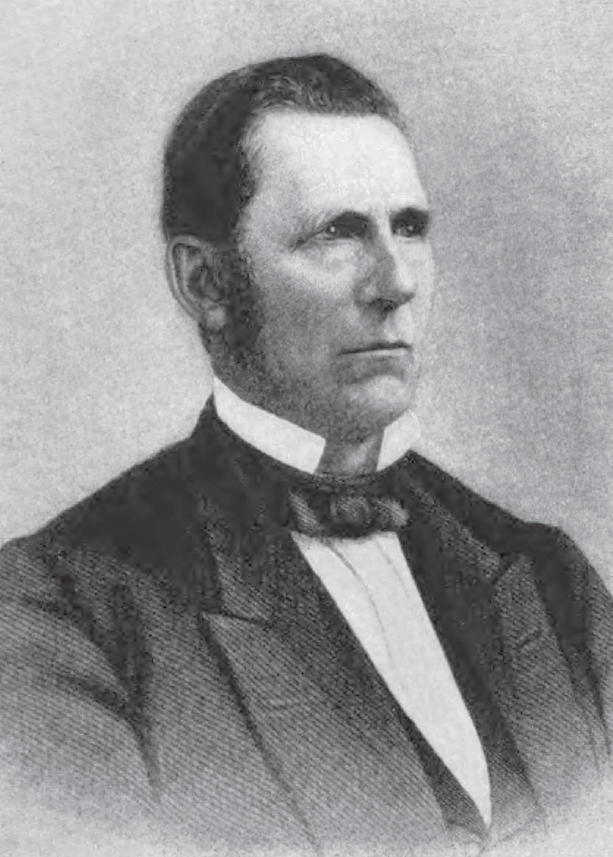
Nominee	William Dennison Jr.	Rufus P. Ranney
Party	Republican	Democratic
Popular vote	184,557	171,226
Percentage	51.87%	48.13%
- County results Dennison: 50–60% 60–70% 70–80% Ranney: 50–60% 60–70%
Governor before election
Salmon P. Chase
Republican
Elected Governor
William Dennison Jr.
Republican

The 1859 Ohio gubernatorial election was held on October 11, 1859. Republican nominee William Dennison Jr. defeated Democratic nominee Rufus P. Ranney with 51.87% of the vote.

== General election ==
=== Candidates ===
- William Dennison Jr., Republican
- Rufus P. Ranney, Democratic

=== Results ===
1859 Ohio gubernatorial election
Party	Candidate	Votes	%	±%
Republican	William Dennison Jr.	184,557	51.87%	
Democratic	Rufus P. Ranney	171,226	48.13%	
Majority		13,331		
Turnout				
Republican hold		Swing		
