= Shield's Crossing =

Historic house in Ohio, United States

- Edwin M. Shield's House
- U.S. National Register of Historic Places
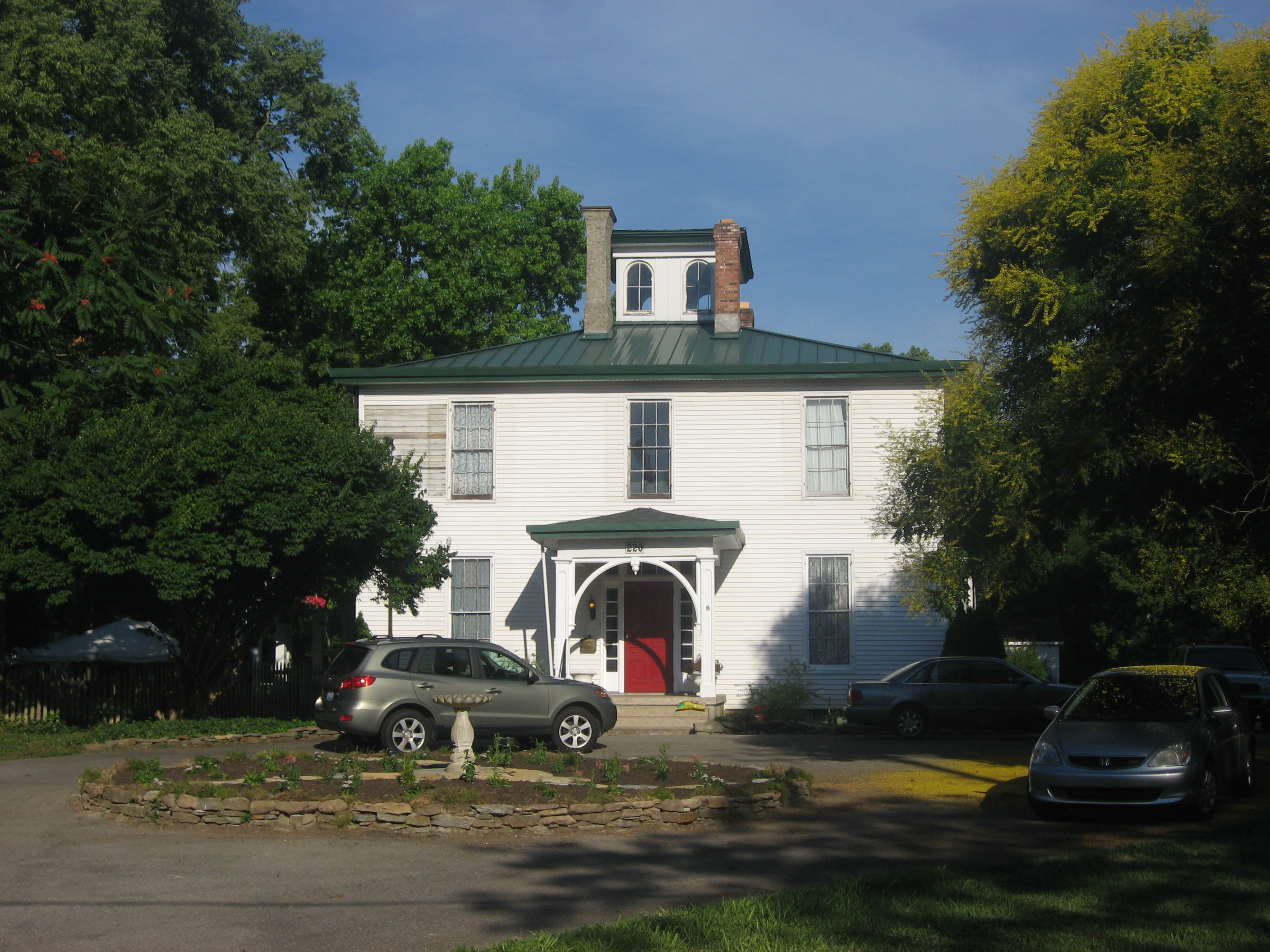
- Front of the house

- Location within Ohio Location within the United States
- Location: 220 Riverside Ave., Loveland, Ohio
- Coordinates: 39°16′0″N 84°15′44″W
- Area: 2.7 acres (1.1 ha)
- Built: 1868
- Architect: Henry Crooks
- Architectural style: Gothic Revival
- NRHP reference No.: 82003592
- Added to NRHP: April 1, 1982

Shield's Crossing is a complex of buildings in the Hamilton County portion of Loveland, Ohio, United States. It centers on the historic home of Edwin M. Shield, which was built in 1868 under the leadership of Henry Crooks. A large two-story frame building built in the shape of the letter "L," the house was Shield's home from its construction until 1879. It is also known as the "William Johnston House".

An early suburbanite, Edwin Shield built the Fulton Foundry near the present house in 1851; he was one of the area's leading industrialists. In the late 1860s, he began to build the present complex, which sits above the Little Miami River: besides the house, which he named "Christeen," the complex includes six outbuildings: a carriage house, a woodshed, a stable, a smokehouse, an icehouse, and a Gothic-styled gazebo.

In 1982, Shield's Crossing was listed on the National Register of Historic Places under the name of "Edwin M. Shield's House." It qualified for inclusion on the Register both because of its historically significant architecture and because of its place in the area's history. Key to its historic designation is its place as one of the area's few remaining examples of 19th-century suburban house complexes.
