= William Virgil Peck =

American judge (1804–1877)

Justice of the Ohio Supreme Court
- In office February 9, 1859 – February 9, 1864
- Preceded by: Thomas Welles Bartley
- Succeeded by: Hocking H. Hunter

Personal details
- Born: April 17, 1804 Canandaigua, New York, U.S.
- Died: December 30, 1877 (aged 73) Portsmouth, Ohio, U.S.
- Resting place: Green Lawn Cemetery
- Party: Republican
- Spouse: Mary Ann Cook
- Children: fourteen
- Education: Litchfield Law School

William V. Peck (April 17, 1804 – December 30, 1877) was a Republican politician in the U.S. State of Ohio who was an Ohio Supreme Court Judge 1859–1864.

Born April 17, 1804 in Canandaigua, New York, William V. Peck grew up in Connecticut, where he studied law at Litchfield Law School. After graduating in 1826, Peck moved to Cincinnati, Ohio, where he clerked in the law office of Bellamy Storer. He moved to Scioto County, Ohio in 1827, and had a law practice there until 1847. In 1844, the Whig Ohio General Assembly elected him a Common Pleas Judge. With the new Constitution in 1851, the public elected him and re-elected him to the same seat in 1856.

In 1858, as a Republican, Peck defeated incumbent Democrat Thomas Welles Bartley as Judge on the Ohio Supreme Court. He declined re-nomination for the 1863 election. He returned to Portsmouth in 1864, and did not resume practice of law.

Peck died December 30, 1877. He is buried at Green Lawn Cemetery in Portsmouth.

Peck married Mary Ann Cook on July 8, 1830. They had fourteen children.

== Notes ==
Legal offices
Preceded by Thomas Welles Bartley	Associate Justice of the Ohio Supreme Court; 1859–1864	Succeeded by Hocking H. Hunter
