= Hocking H. Hunter =

American judge (1801–1872)

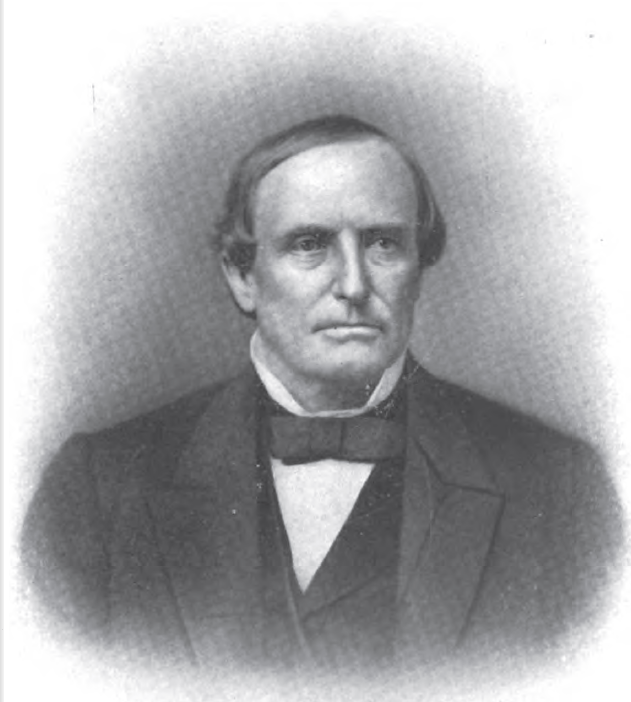

Justice of the Ohio Supreme Court
- In office February 9, 1864 – February 10, 1864
- Preceded by: William Virgil Peck
- Succeeded by: William White

Personal details
- Born: August 23, 1801 Lancaster, Northwest Territory
- Died: February 4, 1872 (aged 70) Lancaster, Ohio, U.S.
- Party: Republican
- Spouse: Ann Matlack
- Children: nine

Hocking H. Hunter (August 23, 1801 – February 4, 1872) was a Republican politician in the U.S. State of Ohio who was elected a judge on the Ohio Supreme Court, but not seated.

== Biography ==
Hocking H. Hunter was born at Lancaster, Ohio. He attended local schools and the Lancaster Academy. He studied law under William W. Irvin, and was admitted to the bar 1824. In 1825 he was appointed Prosecuting Attorney of Fairfield County and re-appointed until 1831. He formed a partnership with Thomas Ewing in 1831.

In 1863, Hunter was nominated and elected by the Republicans as an Ohio Supreme Court Judge, was duly commissioned but never qualified. Sickness in his family and professional duties led him to resign soon after his election.

Hunter died at Lancaster in 1872.

He married Ann Matlack of Fairfield County on November 30, 1823. She had nine children and died in 1889. Son John A. Hunter was Chief Justice of Utah.

== Notes ==
Legal offices
| Preceded by William Virgil Peck | Associate Justice of the Ohio Supreme Court; 1864 | Succeeded by William White |
