= Rufus P. Ranney =

American judge (1813–1891)

Rufus Putnam Ranney
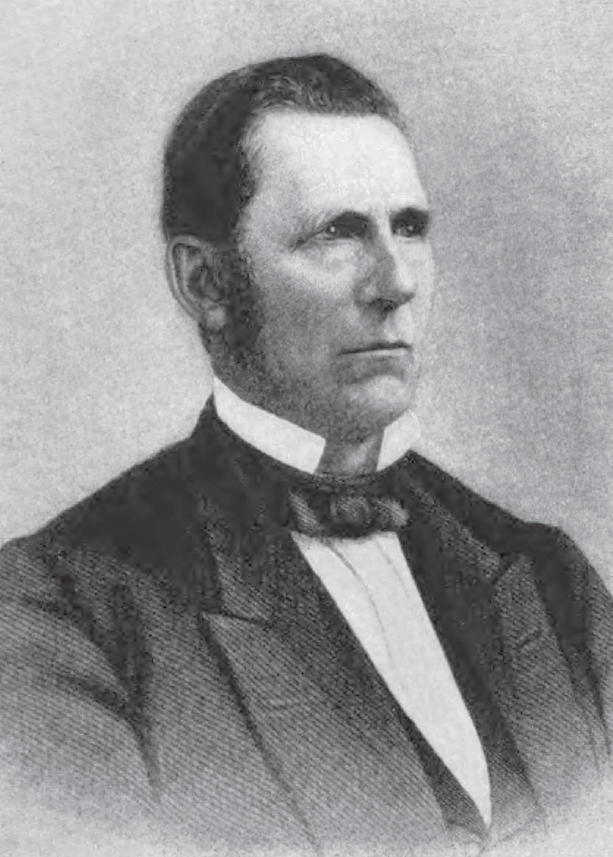

Justice of the Ohio Supreme Court
- In office March 17, 1851 – February 15, 1857
- Preceded by: Edward Avery
- Succeeded by: Josiah Scott
- In office February 9, 1863 – February 23, 1865
- Preceded by: Milton Sutliff
- Succeeded by: John Welch

Personal details
- Born: October 30, 1813 Blandford, Massachusetts, U.S.
- Died: December 6, 1891 (aged 78) Cleveland, Ohio, U.S.
- Resting place: Lake View Cemetery
- Party: Democratic
- Spouse: Adeline W. Warner
- Children: six
- Education: Western Reserve College
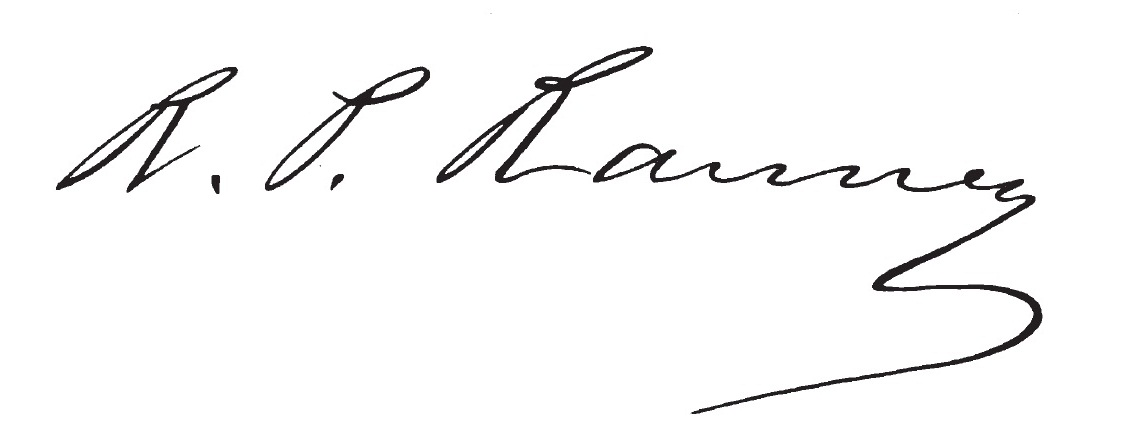
- Signature

Rufus Putnam Ranney (October 30, 1813 – December 6, 1891) was a Democratic politician in the U.S. State of Ohio who helped write the second Ohio Constitution, and was a judge on the Ohio Supreme Court in 1851–1856 and 1863–1865.

== Early life ==
Rufus Putnam Ranney was born at Blandford, Hampden County, Massachusetts. The family moved to Portage County, Ohio in 1824. He earned enough money chopping firewood to enter Western Reserve College then at Hudson, but not enough to complete the college course. At age 21 or 22 he began the study of law at the office of Joshua Reed Giddings and Benjamin Wade, and was admitted to the bar in 1836.

== Legal ==
The firm of Wade and Ranney was formed because Giddings was elected to Congress. In 1845, Wade became judge of the Common Pleas before entering the Senate in 1851. In 1846, Ranney moved to Warren, Trumbull County. The Democrats nominated him for Congress in 1846 and 1848, in a district "hopelessly in the minority".

== Political ==
In 1850, in heavily Whig Trumbull and Geauga counties, Ranney was elected to the second State Constitutional Convention. He served on the committees on the judiciary, on revision, and on amendments. Also on the judiciary committee were Henry Stanbery, Joseph Rockwell Swan, William S. Groesbeck, and William Kennon, Sr.

In 1892, a committee of the Ohio Bar, including Allen G. Thurman, Jacob Dolson Cox, F.E. Hutchins, and Samuel E. Williamson had this to say of Ranney's work at the convention:

Although he was then a young man he was soon recognized as one of the leading members of the convention. In this body of distinguished lawyers, jurists and statesmen, there were few members who had as thorough knowledge of political science, constitutional law, political and judicial history and the principles of jurisprudence as Judge Ranney displayed in the debates of the convention. There was no more profound, acute and convincing reasoner on the floor of the convention, and in the committee rooms his suggestions and enlightened mind were invaluable. The amended constitution conforms very nearly to the principles and provisions advocated by him.

— Ohio Bar Committee, 1892

== Judicial ==
In March, 1851, under the old constitution, the General Assembly elected Ranney to the Supreme Court to succeed Judge Avery. Later that year, he was elected by the public, under the new Constitution, to a five-year term on the Supreme Court. In 1856, Josiah Scott defeated Ranney and a third-party candidate for the seat. Ranney resigned shortly after the election, and Scott was seated late in 1856. Ranney began law practice at Cleveland in the firm Ranney, Backus, and Noble. In 1857 he was United States Attorney for the Northern District of Ohio.

In 1859, Ranney was nominated the Democratic candidate for governor, but lost to Republican William Dennison. In 1862, the Democrats nominated Ranney for Supreme Court again, and the Republicans nominated his law partner Franklin T. Backus. Ranney won, was seated February 1863, and resigned February 23, 1865 to return to private practice in Cleveland.

In 1874, he was appointed an Ohio Commissioner of the Centennial Exposition in Philadelphia

The Ohio State Bar Association was organized in 1881. Ranney was selected the first president of the association. Ranney died at home in Cleveland December 6, 1891. He was buried at Lake View Cemetery.

Ranney was married to Adeline W. Warner, and had four sons and two daughters.

== Notes ==
Legal offices
Preceded by Edward Avery	Ohio Supreme Court Judges; 1851-1857	Succeeded by Josiah Scott
Preceded by Milton Sutliff	Ohio Supreme Court Judges; 1863-1865	Succeeded by John Welch
Preceded by new office	President of the Ohio State Bar Association; July, 1880 - July, 1881	Succeeded by Rufus King
Party political offices
Preceded by Henry B. Payne	Democratic Party nominee for Governor of Ohio; 1859	Succeeded by Hugh J. Jewett
