= 49th Ohio Infantry Regiment =

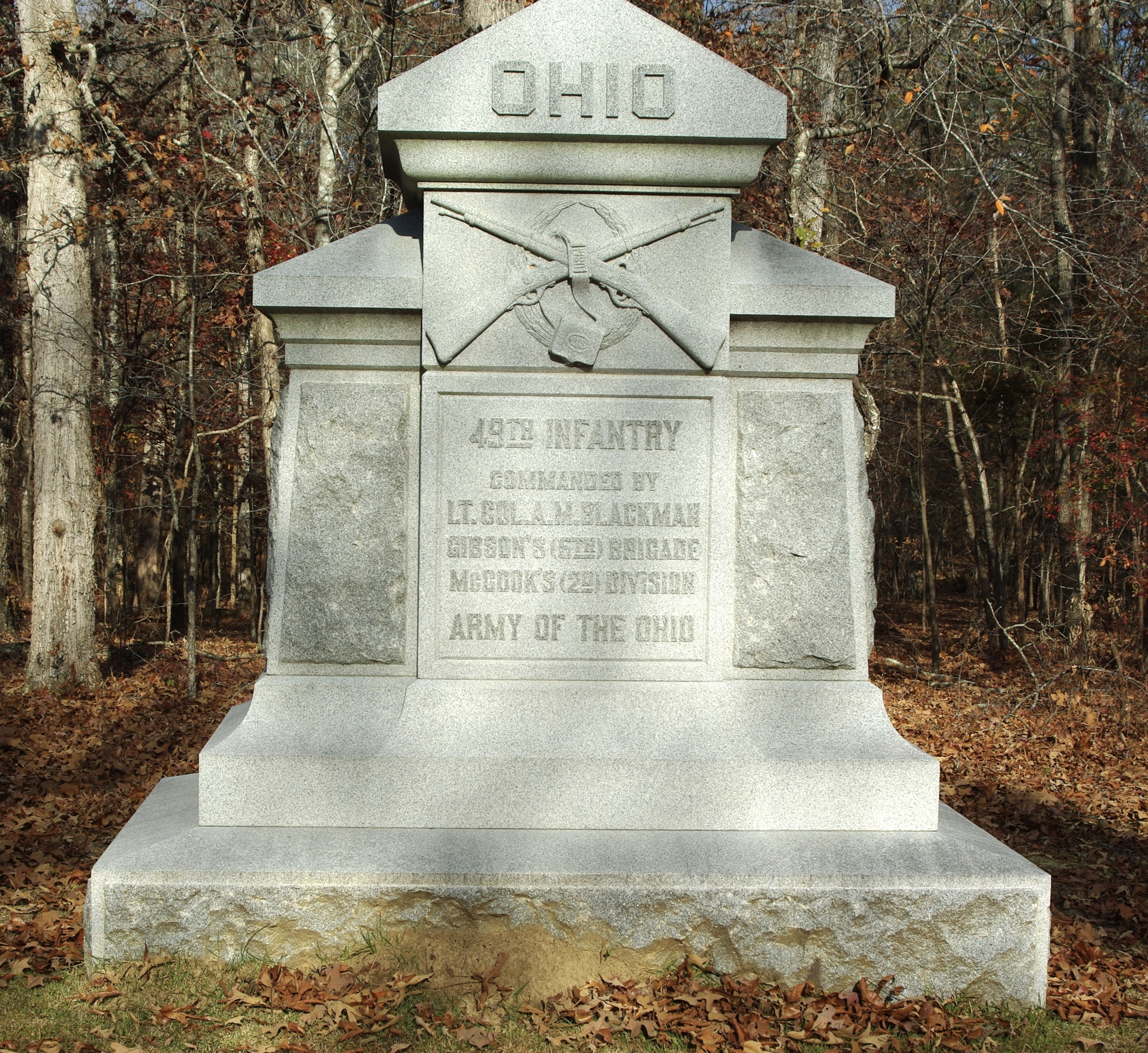
- 49th Ohio Infantry monument at Shiloh
- Active: August 1861 - November 30, 1865
- Country: United States
- Allegiance: Union
- Branch: Union Army
- Type: Infantry
- Engagements: American Civil War: Western Campaign; Battle of Rowlett's Station; Battle of Shiloh; Siege of Corinth; Confederate Heartland Offensive; Battle of Lawrenceburg and Dog Walk; Stones River Campaign; Battle of Stones River; Tullahoma Campaign; Battle of Liberty Gap; Chattanooga campaign; Battle of Chickamauga; Battle of Missionary Ridge; Atlanta campaign; Battle of Resaca; Battle of Pickett's Mill; Battle of Kennesaw Mountain; Siege of Atlanta; Battle of Jonesboro; Franklin–Nashville Campaign; Second Battle of Franklin; Battle of Nashville

Commanders
- Notable commanders: Col. William Harvey Gibson

The 49th Ohio Infantry Regiment (or 49th OVI) was an infantry regiment in the Union Army during the American Civil War. The regiment served as part of the Horn Brigade for most of its service.

== Service ==
The 49th Ohio Infantry Regiment was organized at Camp Noble in Tiffin, Ohio, August and September 1861 and mustered in for three years service under the command of Colonel William H. Gibson. The 49th Ohio Infantry has the distinction of being the first Union regiment to enter Kentucky after Confederate forces violated the state's neutrality.

The regiment was attached to Johnson's Brigade, McCook's Command, at Nolin, Ky., to November 1861. 6th Brigade, Army of the Ohio, to December 1861. 6th Brigade, 2nd Division, Army of the Ohio, to September 1862. 6th Brigade, 2nd Division, I Corps, Army of the Ohio, to November 1862. 1st Brigade, 2nd Division, Right Wing, XIV Corps, Army of the Cumberland, to January 1863. 1st Brigade, 2nd Division, XX Corps, Army of the Cumberland, to October 1863. 1st Brigade, 3rd Division, IV Corps, to August 1865. Department of Texas to November 1865.

The 49th Ohio Infantry mustered out of service at Victoria, Texas on November 30, 1865.

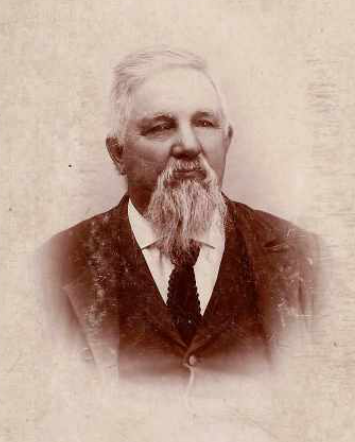
Cpl. George D. Harris, veteran of Company I, captured at the Battle of Stones River and exchanged in July, 1863.

== Detailed service ==
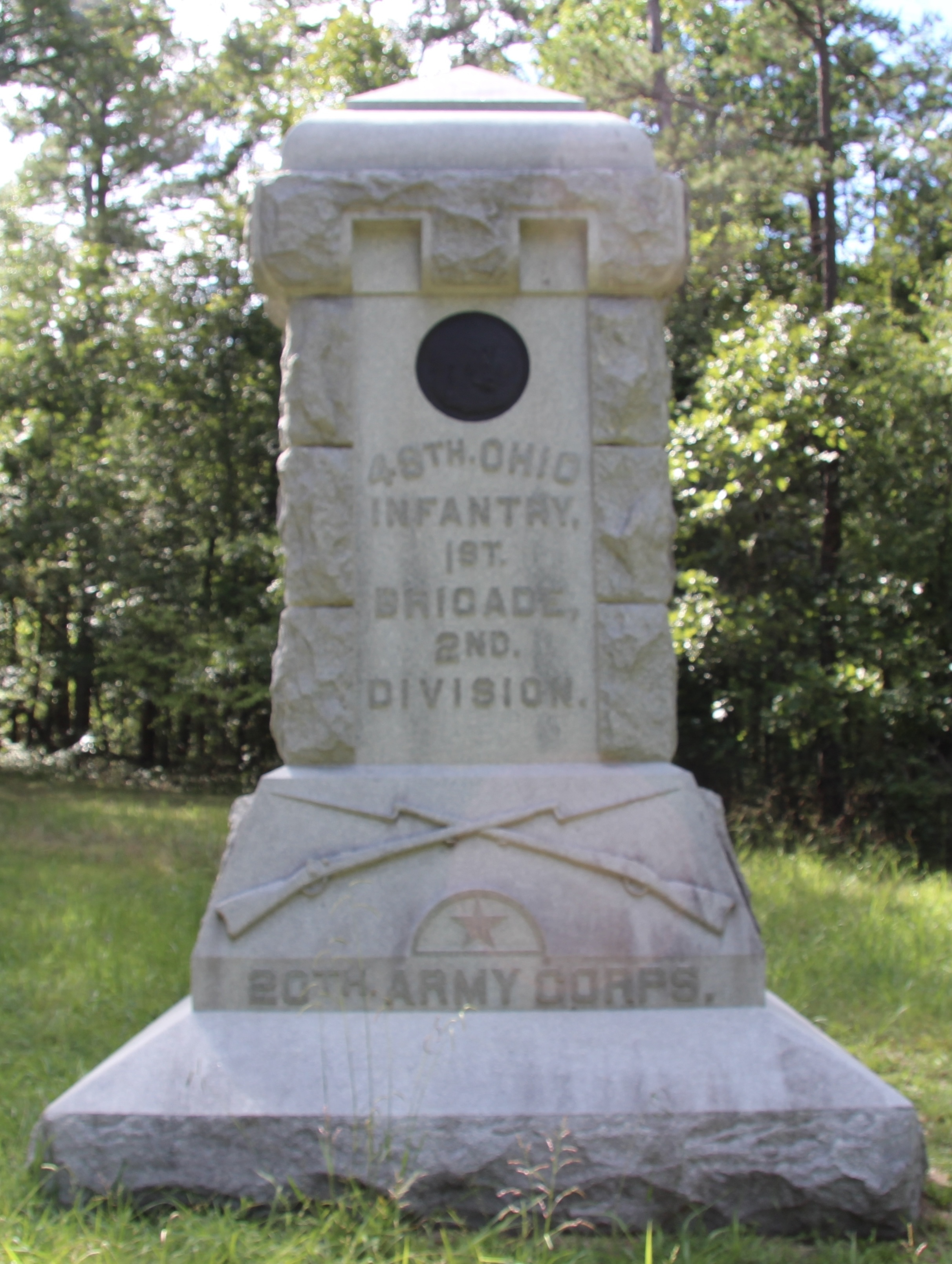
49th Ohio Infantry monument at Chickamauga.

Moved to Camp Dennison, Ohio, September 10, 1861; thence to Louisville, Ky., September 21. Moved to Camp Nevin, Ky., October 10. Occupation of Munfordsville December 10, 1861. Duty at Munfordville until February 1862. Advance to Bowling Green, Ky., and Nashville, Tenn., February 14 – March 3. March to Savannah, Tenn., March 16 – April 6. Battle of Shiloh, Tenn., April 6–7. Advance on and siege of Corinth, Miss., April 29 – May 30 March to Battle Creek, Ala., June 10 – July 18, and duty there until August 20. March to Louisville, Ky., in pursuit of Bragg August 20 – September 26. Pursuit of Bragg into Kentucky October 1–15. Lawrenceburg, Ky., October 8. Dog Walk October 9. March to Nashville, Tenn., October 16 – November 7, and duty there until December 26. Advance on Murfreesboro December 26–30. Battle of Stones River December 30–31, 1862 and January 1–3, 1863. Duty at Murfreesboro until June. Christiana and Middleton March 6. Tullahoma Campaign June 22 – July 7. Liberty Gap June 22–27. Occupation of middle Tennessee until August 16. Passage of the Cumberland Mountains and Tennessee River and Chickamauga Campaign August 16 – September 22. Battle of Chickamauga September 19–20. Siege of Chattanooga, Tenn., September 24 – November 23. Chattanooga-Ringgold Campaign November 23–27. Orchard Knob November 23–24. Missionary Ridge November 25. Pursuit to Graysville November 26–27. March to relief of Knoxville, Tenn., November 28 – December 8. Operations in eastern Tennessee until February 1864. At Cleveland, Tenn., until April. Atlanta Campaign May 1 to September 8. Demonstrations on Rocky Faced Ridge and Dalton May 8–13. Battle of Resaca May 14–15. Adairsville May 17. Near Kingston May 18–19. Near Cassville May 19. Advance on Dallas May 22–25. Operations on line of Pumpkin Vine Creek and battles about Dallas, New Hope Church and Allatoona Hills May 25 – June 5. Pickett's Mills May 27. Operations about Marietta and against Kennesaw Mountain June 10 – July 2. Pine Hill June 11–14. Lost Mountain June 15–17. Assault on Kennesaw June 27. Ruff's Station July 4. Chattahoochie River July 5–17. Peachtree Creek July 19–20. Siege of Atlanta July 22 – August 25. Flank movement on Jonesboro August 25–30. Battle of Jonesboro August 25–30. Battle of Jonesboro August 31 – September 1. Lovejoy's Station September 2–6. Operations against Hood in northern Georgia and northern Alabama September 29 – November 3. Nashville Campaign November–December. Columbia, Duck River, November 24–27. Battle of Franklin November 30. Battle of Nashville December 15–16. Pursuit of Hood to the Tennessee River December 17–28. Moved to Huntsville, Ala., and duty there until March 1865. Operations in eastern Tennessee March 15 – April 22. Duty at Nashville, Tenn., until June. Moved to New Orleans, La., June 16; thence to Texas. Duty at Green Lake, San Antonio and Victoria until November.

== Casualties ==
The regiment lost a total of 363 men during service; 14 officers and 188 enlisted men killed or mortally wounded, 1 officer and 160 enlisted men died of disease.

== Commanders ==
- Colonel William Harvey Gibson
- Colonel Samuel F. Gray – commanded at the battle of Stones River as captain; commanded at the battle of Chickamauga as major
- Lieutenant Colonel Levi Drake – commanded at the battle of Stones River
- Major Luther Martin Strong – commanded at the battle of Chickamauga as captain; commanded at the battle of Nashville
- Captain Daniel Hartsough – commanded at the battle of Nashville

== Notable members ==
- Major Luther Martin Strong – U.S. Representative from Ohio, 1893–1897

== See also ==
Horn Brigade

- List of Ohio Civil War units
- Ohio in the Civil War
