= William Johnston (judge) =

American judge and politician

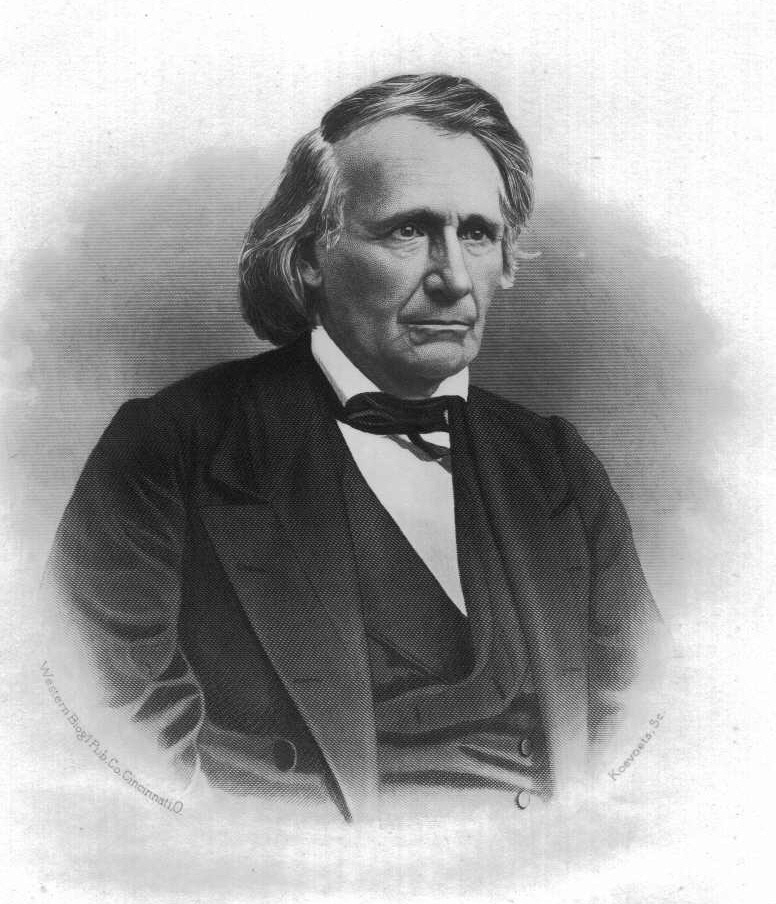

Member of the Ohio House of Representatives from the Carroll County district
- In office December 4, 1837 – December 2, 1838
- Preceded by: Isaac Atkinson
- Succeeded by: James Forbes, Jr.

Personal details
- Born: April 1, 1804 Shippensburg, Pennsylvania, U.S.
- Died: October 15, 1891 (aged 87) Loveland, Ohio, U.S.
- Resting place: Spring Grove Cemetery
- Party: Whig
- Spouse: Elizabeth Blackstone
- Children: four
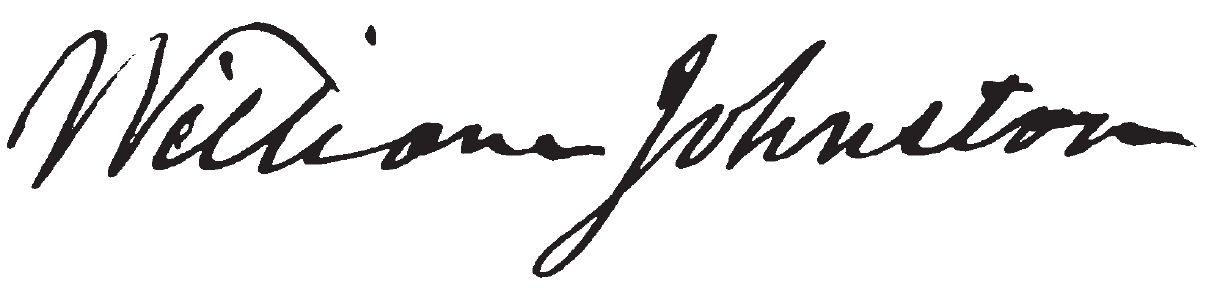
- Signature

William Johnston (April 1, 1804 – October 15, 1891) was a Whig politician from the U.S. State of Ohio. He served in the state legislature, was Surveyor General of the Northwest Territory, was a judge, and was nominated by his party for Governor of Ohio. He had a highly profitable legal career.

== Youth ==
William Johnston was born April 1, 1804, at Shippensburg, Pennsylvania. His Scots-Irish parents moved the family to Yellow Creek, Jefferson County, Ohio, in 1808, where he grew up. He attended the schools of Ross Township, and studied law under John Crafts Wright of Steubenville. He is said to have started the first temperance society in the county in 1833.

== Early professional career ==
Johnston settled at Carrollton, Carroll County, where he was "soon retained on one side or the other of all important litigation." He was elected prosecuting attorney of Carroll County. He then served in the Ohio House of Representatives for a year. He was active in the legislature, and was effective in his advocacy for the common-school law and the abolition of imprisonment for debt.

After describing the difficulties he had had in obtaining an education, he insisted that boys and girls should have a better chance than he did on the banks of "Yaller Creek." He said "The old Irish schoolmaster holds forth three months of the year in a poor cabin, with greased-paper window panes. The children trudge three miles through winter snow and mud to school. They begin at a-b, ab, and get over as far as b-oo-by, booby, when school gives out, and they take up their spring work on the farm. The next winter, when school takes up again, having forgotten all that they had been taught previously in the speller, they begin again at a-b, ab, but year after year never get any further than b-oo-by, booby."

Judge Burnet said it was the most powerful speech on education ever made in Ohio, but Samuel Medary of the Ohio Statesman gave him the name Booby Johnson disrespectfully. The nickname stuck among Johnston's friends.

Johnston also wrote the law which abolished imprisonment for debt in Ohio, when not accompanied by fraud. He was in Steubenville at the time when founder of the city Bezaleel Wells went bankrupt, and was jailed for his debts. The 1802 Ohio Constitution allowed a non-fraudulent debtor to be held in prison until he "delivered up his estate for the benefit of his creditors." Johnston felt the law was unjust, and vowed he would repeal the law should he ever be elected to the legislature.

== Move to Cincinnati ==
Johnston moved to Cincinnati, Ohio, in 1839. His first year, 1840, was involved campaigning for William Henry Harrison for president. He "made a great reputation as a stump orator," and was "making a reputation as an orator scarcely equaled by that of any of the celebrated speakers of that wonderful campaign." His efforts in the campaign led to his appointment as Surveyor General of the Northwest Territory, responsible for the states of Ohio, Indiana and Michigan. He held that position until 1845.

After ending his federal service, Johnston became judge of the Superior Court of Cincinnati (1847-1850), which he held until he ran for Governor of Ohio as the Whig nominee in 1850.

In 1850, Johnston came second to Democrat Reuben Wood in a three-way race for Governor. He returned to private practice that autumn, and was very successful, "particularly before juries." "No person could listen to him and ever forget his clearness of logic, his simplicity, his force of style, his vivid flashes of wit, his mirth provoking humor, his moving elocution." He was long associated with Thomas Corwin, including obtaining an acquittal with an argument of self-defense in an 1858 trial when ex-Ohio Governor William Bebb was charged with manslaughter in Illinois. He also associated with Reverdy Johnson in a Revolutionary War claim against the United States Government, for which they received a fee of $100,000.

In 1861, Johnston moved to Washington, D.C., and practiced before the Court of Claims and the United States Supreme Court. In 1866, President Andrew Johnson appointed him to the commission to revise the statutes of the United States, where he served for three years. He then retired from public service, and retired from practice at age seventy.

== Personal ==
Johnston married Elizabeth Blackstone of Smithfield Township, Jefferson County, Ohio, and had two sons, who preceded him in death, and two daughters, who survived him. He spent the last years of his life at Loveland, Ohio, where he died October 15, 1891. The William Johnston House at Loveland is now listed on the National Register of Historic Places.

== Notes ==
Ohio House of Representatives
Preceded by Isaac Atkinson	Representative from Carroll County; December 4, 1837 – December 2, 1838	Succeeded by James Forbes, Jr.
Political offices
Preceded by Ezekiel S. Haines	Surveyor General of the Northwest Territory; 1842–1845	Succeeded by Lucius Lyon
Legal offices
Preceded by Charles D. Coffin	Judge of the Superior Court of Cincinnati; 1847–1850	Succeeded by Charles P. James
Party political offices
Preceded by Seabury Ford	Whig Party nominee for Governor of Ohio; 1850	Succeeded by Samuel Finley Vinton
