= Edward Avery (judge) =

American judge

Justice of the Ohio Supreme Court
- In office February 6, 1847 – March 1, 1851
- Preceded by: Reuben Wood
- Succeeded by: Rufus P. Ranney

Member of the Ohio Senate from the Wayne County district
- In office December 6, 1824 – December 3, 1826
- Preceded by: Thomas McMillan
- Succeeded by: Joseph Larwill

Personal details
- Born: February 20, 1790 Stamford, Connecticut, US
- Died: June 27, 1866 (aged 76) Wooster, Ohio, US
- Resting place: Wooster Cemetery
- Party: Whig
- Spouse(s): Jane Galbreath; Gennetta Marie Sherwood
- Children: one
- Education: Yale University

Edward Avery (February 20, 1790 – June 27, 1866) was a lawyer from Wooster, Ohio, United States, who was an Ohio State Senator and served on the Ohio Supreme Court from 1847 to 1851. He later helped found the College of Wooster and the Wooster Cemetery.

== Biography ==
Edward Avery was born February 20, 1790, in Stamford, Connecticut. He graduated with a bachelor's degree in 1810 from Yale University. He studied law and was admitted to the bar in Connecticut in 1813. He traveled to Europe in 1816. In 1817, he became the second lawyer to locate in Wooster, Ohio.

In 1819, Avery was appointed prosecuting attorney of Wayne County, Ohio, and served until 1825. He was elected to the Ohio State Senate in 1824 and served one two-year term. His re-election in 1826 was contested in the Senate, and his seat given to his opponent.

After he complete his service in the Senate, Avery returned to his practice in Wooster. In 1832 he was one of four trustees of the town, and was a school examiner. He also mentored law students.

On January 15, 1847, the Ohio General Assembly elected Avery to a seat on the Ohio Supreme Court to a seven-year term that began February 6, 1847. The judges traveled to each county in the state in those days. The job was arduous, and Avery's health gave out. He submitted his resignation March 1, 1851, and was replaced by the legislature on March 17, 1851.

After returning to Wooster, Avery retired from law practice. He helped establish the College of Wooster and was generous in giving to it. He guarantee the notes to establish the non-denominational Wooster Cemetery. He was an elder in the Presbyterian church.

Avery married Jane Galbreath of Steubenville, Ohio November 25, 1823 or December 28, 1823. She died in 1824, and Avery married Gennette Marie Sherwood on February 3, 1834. Gennette had no children.

Avery died June 27, 1866, at Wooster. He was buried at Wooster Cemetery next to his two wives and daughter.
