= Michael Schuck Bebb =

American systematic botanist

- Born: December 23, 1833; Hamilton, Butler County, Ohio, United States
- Died: December 5, 1895; San Bernardino, California, United States
- Education: Beloit College, Wisconsin,
- Known for: Extensive research into the genus Salix
- Awards: member of the Philadelphia, Buffalo and Chicago Academies of Science
- Scientific career
- Fields: Botany
- Author abbrev. (botany): Bebb

Michael Schuck Bebb (December 23, 1833 – December 5, 1895) was an American systematic botanist in the 19th century with a reputation as the leading salicologist in both America and Europe. His extensive work on the genus Salix led to several plants being named in his honour.

== Biography ==
Michael Schuck Bebb was born on December 23, 1833, in Butler County, Ohio, one of five children to William Bebb and Sarah Schuck. His formative years were spent on the family farm in Hamilton, Ohio, where his interest in horticultural subjects took root amidst "the pleasure grounds, vegetable and fruit gardens" and "well stocked greenhouse". Through his uncle, Evan Bebb, the young Bebb received a complete set of the Natural History Reports of the State of New York and Emerson's Trees and Shrubs of Massachusetts. These books opened up the hitherto unknown world of botany to the sixteen-year-old, who could now trace the genera and species of given plants and learn from their relationship. Applying this new found knowledge to the trees, shrubs and herbs around him, Bebb began work collecting and preparing specimens for his famous herbarium of later years.

During this time his father, William Bebb had become active in politics and campaigned for the Whig politician William Henry Harrison in 1836 and 1840. In 1846, he himself was elected Governor of Ohio, only the third governor born in the state. After declining a second term in office, Governor Bebb withdrew from public life and moved his family to his newly acquired estate "Fountaindale" in Winnebago County, Illinois. Instead of travelling with the family, the-then 17 year old Michael Bebb assisted his brother-in-law in driving a herd of short horn cattle four hundred miles into the state of Illinois. This epic journey opened up new and exciting species of flora to the young man and further fuelled his growing passion for botany.

During his time at Fountaindale, Bebb acquired four standard books, Wood's Class Book of Botany, Gray's Botanical Text Book and Manual, Torrey and Gray's Flora of North America, and Gray's Genera Illustrata, which enabled him to develop into a trained and skilled veteran of natural flora.

During his time attending Beloit College in Wisconsin, he became acquainted with Dr. George Vasey, after a chance encounter at a local state fair. A short time later, Bebb received a collection of grasses, sedges and junci from Vasey. Their correspondence and exchanges would continue through the years. As well as Vasey, Bebb also corresponded with a number of other noted botanists over the years including Dr. Asa Gray, William M. Canby and Henry Nicholas Bolander.

In 1857, he married Katherine Josephine Hancock, a member of the celebrated Massachusetts family of the same name and in 1861 moved the family to Washington where Michael was employed in the Pensions office. During his free time, Michael continued to collect plants and to correspond and exchange with the leading botanists of the day. He joined the Naturalists’ Club and became well known amongst the scientific community in Washington.

In 1865, his wife died, leaving him the sole guardian of their three children. He resigned from the Pensions office and, on February 19, 1867, he married Anna Carpenter and moved the whole family to the Fountaindale estate in Illinois. It was here, in 1873 that Bebb began his special study of willows, corresponding with the eminent British authority on Salix, Rev. J.E. Leefe. In 1874, he was asked to contribute his salices to Brewer and Watson’s Botany of California by Asa Gray, and in the same year he published his first scientific paper on willows in The American Naturalist, entitled a "new species of willow (S. laevigata) from California, and notes on some other North American species".

In 1878, he began to contribute writings to the Botanical Gazette on various aspects of willows. These included six papers entitled Notes on North American Willows. His work on willows also appeared in Rothrock’s Botany of the Wheeler Report and in the Botany of California as well as his illustrations in the Gray's Manual Flora. In 1880, the leading Swedish authority on Salices, Nils J. Anderson died, leaving Michael Schuck Bebb as the eminent botanist on the genus Salix. In 1880/1881 he issued the exsiccata Herbarium Salicum. In October 1879, the family moved from "Fountaindale" to Rockford, Illinois. The financial strain of a farm the size of Fountaindale had proved too costly for Bebb and he eventually sold the property to a practical farmer.

In 1885, he suffered a serious attack of pleurisy, to which he never fully recovered, though this did not hamper his botanical zeal, publishing four series of “Notes on the White Mountain willows” in the Bulletin of the Torrey Botanical Club between 1888 and 1890, and contributed the Salices to the sixth edition of Gray's Manual, also in 1890.

Towards the end of his life, his industrious work on the genus Salix was rewarded by the naming of several plants in his honour.

In 1885, the genus Bebbia, native to Southern California was named in his honour by Prof. E. L. Greene and published in the Bulletin of the California Academy of Sciences. In 1889, the variety Carex tribuloides Wahl. var. Bebbii was created by Prof. L. H. Bailey and in 1895, Salix Bebbiana published by Prof. C. S. Sargent in Garden and Forest, with the inscription to Bebb as "the learned, industrious and distinguished salicologist of the United States to whom, more than to any one else of this generation we owe our knowledge of American willows."

Michael Schuck Bebb died on December 5, 1895. He was buried at the West Side cemetery in Rockford, Illinois.
