= William Dennison Jr. =

American politician (1815–1882)

William Dennison
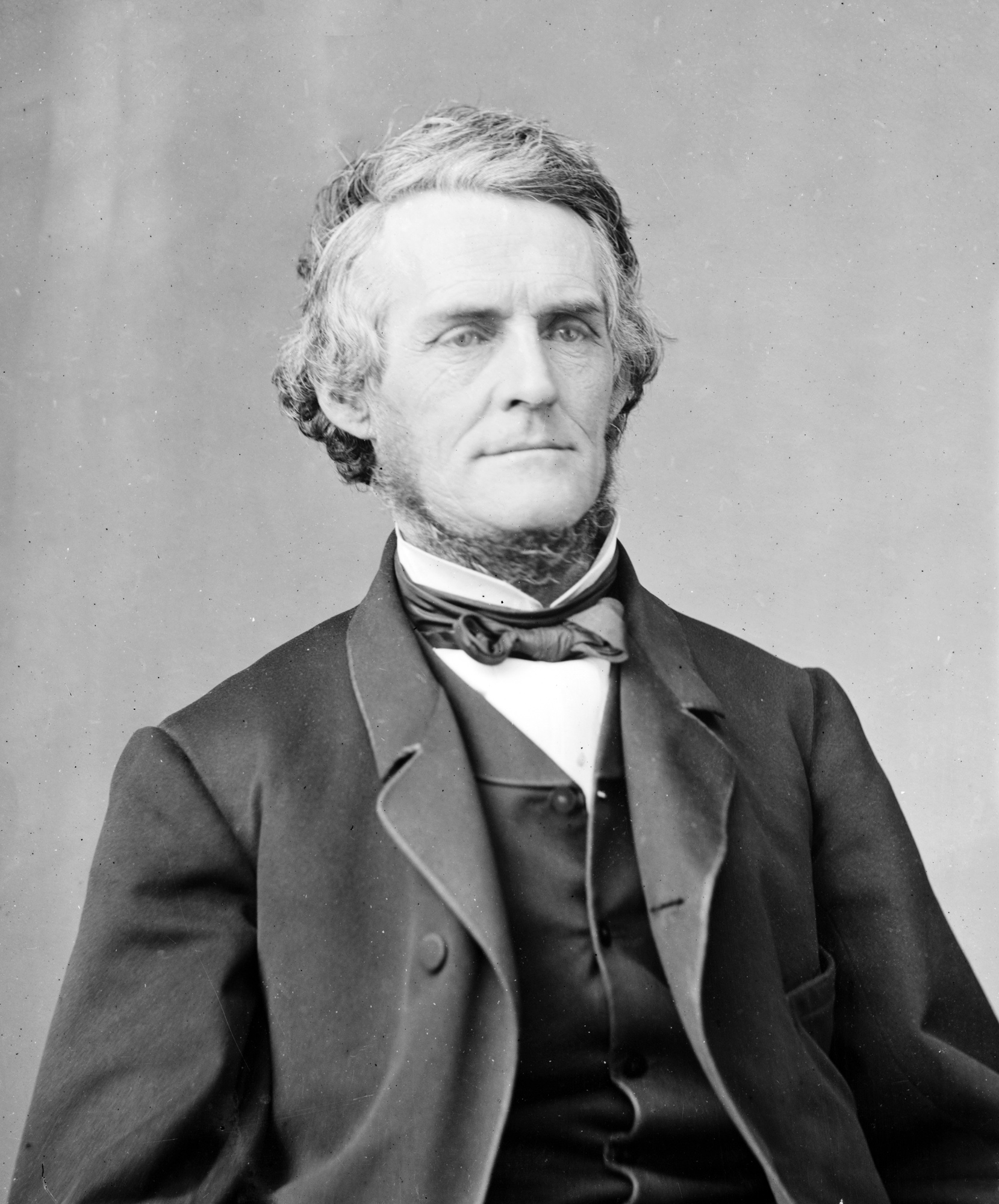
- Dennison, 1855–1865

President of the Board of Commissioners of the District of Columbia
- De facto
- In office July 1, 1874 – July 1, 1878
- Preceded by: Alexander Shepherd (Governor)
- Succeeded by: Seth Phelps

21st United States Postmaster General
- In office September 24, 1864 – July 25, 1866
- President: Abraham Lincoln; Andrew Johnson
- Preceded by: Montgomery Blair
- Succeeded by: Alexander Randall

24th Governor of Ohio
- In office January 9, 1860 – January 13, 1862
- Lieutenant: Robert C. Kirk
- Preceded by: Salmon P. Chase
- Succeeded by: David Tod

Personal details
- Born: November 23, 1815 Cincinnati, Ohio, U.S.
- Died: June 15, 1882 (aged 66) Columbus, Ohio, U.S.
- Resting place: Green Lawn Cemetery
- Party: Whig (before 1854); Republican (1854–1882)
- Spouse: Anne Neil
- Education: Miami University, Oxford (BA)
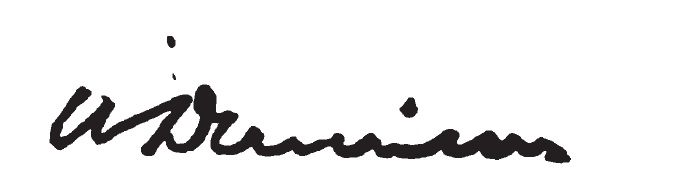
- Signature

William Dennison Jr. (November 23, 1815 – June 15, 1882) was a Whig and Republican politician from Ohio. He served as the 24th governor of Ohio and as U.S. Postmaster General in the Cabinet of President Abraham Lincoln during the American Civil War.

== Early life and career ==
Born in Cincinnati, Dennison graduated from Miami University, studied law, and was admitted to the Ohio bar in 1840. A canny businessman, he led the Exchange Bank and the Columbus and Xenia Railroad, and organized the Columbus and Hocking Valley Railroad, while becoming active in politics.

In 1840, he married Anne Eliza Neil, the daughter of the wealthy Columbus businessman William Neil, whose farm later became the campus of Ohio State University. Together, William and Anne Dennison had seven children. The eldest of them was a son, William Neil Dennison, who later won distinction in the Civil War while serving in the U.S. Horse Artillery Brigade.

William Dennison Jr. was one of the first major Ohio politicians to leave the dying Whig Party for the new Republican Party. He rose quickly through the party ranks due to his anti-slavery and anti-discrimination efforts in the Ohio State Senate. Dennison was elected to the governorship in 1859, defeating Rufus P. Ranney, and served a single term from 1860 to 1862. Before the outbreak of the American Civil War, he refused the demands of Kentucky and Virginia state authorities for the extradition of fugitive slaves or the punishment of those who helped them.

== Civil War ==
With turmoil growing in the neighboring Virginia and many states in the south seceding, Dennison, like the governors of most other states, set immediately to recruiting troops and mustering militia to defend his state. When Lincoln issued the proclamation for 75,000 in militia, Dennison was requested from Washington by wire to raise thirteen regiments of militia, but he wired back that he "could hardly stop before twenty" due to the large turnout of recruits and his concern that secessionist troops could attack Ohio from the direction of Northwest Virginia. Dennison, unfamiliar with military affairs, was like the governors of Pennsylvania, New York, and Michigan searching for qualified military men to command their growing state militia, and none was more sought after than George B. McClellan at the time, owing to his former experience and tour to the Crimean war. McClellan set out to his native state of Pennsylvania, where he wished to take command of the state militia, and its governor had even dispatched by wire the offer to McClellan, offering him command of the state militia, but it had not arrived. McClellan stopped at Columbus on his way to Pennsylvania to discuss the military situation in the Ohio valley with Dennison. Dennison was impressed with him and offered him command of the state militia on the spot. Dennison later tried but failed to be elected to the United States Senate in 1861, when he was defeated by John Sherman.

Dennison and his cabinet observed the ominous developments in north-western Virginia throughout mid-April 1861 to May of that year, where northwestern Virginians were convening to secede from eastern Virginia, and pro-union sentiment was common and widespread. Richmond at the same time was also vying to send troops to the area to suppress these secessionist activities. Many Northwestern Virginians wrote to Dennison requesting him to send troops from Ohio to the area to defend from possible reprisals from east Virginia, the editor of the Wheeling Intelligencer wrote a letter to Dennison encouraging him to occupy NW Virginia, writing that "Secession is creeping up", and that "Union men in Northwestern Virginia will shortly be slaughtered". Without being asked by the War Department, he sent Ohio troops under George McClellan into western Virginia at May 4, 1861, where they guarded the Wheeling Convention, which eventually led to the admission of West Virginia as a free state. He also took the initiative to seize control of Ohio's railroads and telegraph lines early in the war to allow military usage, angering Peace Democrats in the Ohio Legislature. He denounced secession and Ohio's "Copperheads", established a consistent supply of arms and equipment for the new troops, and was a vocal supporter of Lincoln's policies. During his term, he raised over 100,000 troops and organized 82 three-years regiments for the Union army.

However, errors by the Governor and his subordinates led the state's alliance of Republicans and War Democrats to drop Dennison as a candidate in 1862. The parties turned instead to David Tod, a War Democrat. Historian Richard H. Abbott wrote, "No Ohio chief executive [before Dennison] had ever exercised such powers and fulfilled such duties with a greater sense of public responsibility and determination. Nevertheless...politics dictated his demise."

Dennison accepted this turn of events with good grace, capably advised his successor, and provided valuable services in helping recruit black troops for Ohio units. He served as Chairman of the Republican National Convention in 1864. He was appointed U.S. Postmaster General by President Abraham Lincoln, and served from 1864 to 1866, leaving the Cabinet after he decided he could no longer support the policies of President Andrew Johnson.

== Postbellum career and memorialization ==
After the war, Dennison served on the Columbus City Council and organized the Franklin County Agricultural Society. President Ulysses S. Grant appointed him a Commissioner for the District of Columbia, the highest governing office of Washington, D.C., in which Dennison served from 1874 to 1878, acting in the capacity of a board president at all meetings he attended (no provision had been made for a president of the board, and none was ever formally elected). He sought the Republican nomination for the U.S. Senate in 1880, but was defeated by James Garfield. Dennison remained active in state and national politics until his death. He left behind a widow and seven children, and was buried in Green Lawn Cemetery, Columbus, Ohio.

Of Dennison's single term in the opening stages of the Civil War, historian John S. Stilt wrote, "His wisdom and foresight were appreciated by few and condemned by many.... It is doubtful whether any of his predecessors could have met the issues any more successfully."

Camp #1 of the Department of Ohio of the Sons of Union Veterans of the Civil War is named for Governor William Dennison. It was chartered August 1, 1882, shortly after Dennison's June 15, 1882 death at age 66.

The William Dennison school in Washington, DC, named in his honor, was opened in 1885 on S Street between 13th and 14th Streets, NW. It closed sometime after 1947 and was razed prior to 1985.

Dennison is honored with a full-size bronze depiction inside the Cuyahoga County Soldiers' and Sailors' Monument in Cleveland, Ohio for his service as governor during the Civil War.

Camp Dennison is a census-designated place (CDP) just outside Indian Hill in southern Symmes Township, Hamilton County, Ohio, United States. It has a post office with the ZIP code 45111.[3] The population was 375 at the 2010 census. The community was settled in 1796 by German immigrants.[5] During the American Civil War, Camp Dennison served as a military recruiting and training post for the United States Army (see Camp Dennison). It is named for William Dennison, the 24th Governor of Ohio and U.S. Postmaster General under President Abraham Lincoln.

Party political offices
Preceded by Salmon P. Chase	Republican nominee for Governor of Ohio; 1859	Succeeded by David Tod
Political offices
Preceded by Salmon P. Chase	Governor of Ohio; 1860–1862	Succeeded by David Tod
Preceded by Montgomery Blair	United States Postmaster General; 1864–1866	Succeeded by Alexander Randall
Preceded by Alexander Shepherd as Governor of the District of Columbia	President of the Board of Commissioners of the District of Columbia; De facto 1874–1878	Succeeded by Seth Phelps
