= Thomas W. Bartley =

American judge (1812–1885)

Thomas Welles Bartley
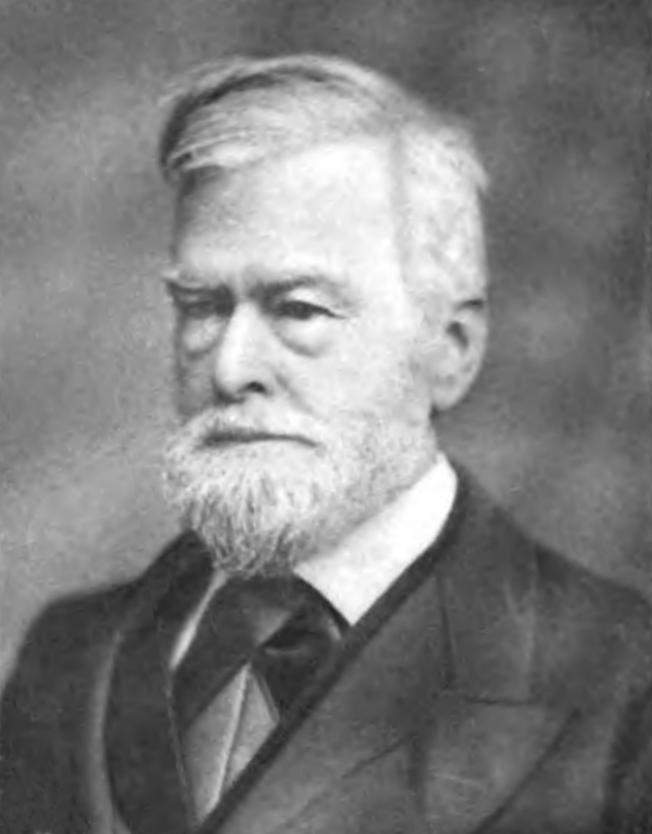

17th Governor of Ohio
- In office April 15, 1844 – December 3, 1844
- Preceded by: Wilson Shannon
- Succeeded by: Mordecai Bartley

28th Speaker of the Ohio Senate
- In office December 4, 1843 – December 1, 1844
- Preceded by: Wilson Shannon
- Succeeded by: Mordecai Bartley

Associate Justice of the Ohio Supreme Court
- In office February 2, 1852 – February 9, 1859
- Preceded by: Rufus Paine Spalding
- Succeeded by: William Virgil Peck

Member of the Ohio House of Representatives from Richland County
- In office 1839–1841
- Preceded by: James Comings
- Succeeded by: R. W. Cahill; James P. Henderson

Member of the Ohio Senate from Richland County
- In office 1841–1845
- Preceded by: William McLaughlin
- Succeeded by: Joseph Newman

Personal details
- Born: February 11, 1812 Jefferson County, Ohio, U.S.
- Died: June 20, 1885 (aged 73) Washington, D.C., U.S.
- Resting place: Glenwood Cemetery, Washington, D.C.
- Party: Democratic
- Spouses: Julia Maria Larwill; Susan D. Sherman; Ellen McCoy
- Education: Jefferson College

Thomas Welles Bartley (February 11, 1812 – June 20, 1885) was an American Democratic politician from the U.S. state of Ohio. He served as the 17th governor of Ohio. Bartley was succeeded in office by his father, Mordecai Bartley, one of only a few instances of this occurring in high elected office in the United States.

== Biography ==
Bartley was born in Jefferson County, Ohio on February 11, 1812. As a child, he moved to Mansfield, Ohio with his family. Bartley attended Jefferson College and graduated in 1829. He studied law with Jacob Parker in Mansfield, Ohio, and studied law with Elijah Hayward in Washington, D.C.. Bartley was admitted to the bar in 1833, and began practice in Mansfield.

== Career ==
Bartley served in the Ohio House of Representatives from 1839 to 1841 and then in the Ohio State Senate from 1841 to 1845. He was elected Speaker of the Senate in 1843.

When Wilson Shannon resigned as governor on April 15, 1844, to take a diplomatic appointment as United States ambassador to Mexico, Bartley became Governor while concurrently remaining in the Senate. He served out the remainder of Shannon's term until December 3. Bartley sought renomination under the Democratic Party, but lost at the state convention by a single vote - avoiding a contest against his father, who accepted the Whig nomination. Bartley later served a contentious term on the Ohio State Supreme Court from 1852 to 1859.

Bartley lived in Mansfield, Ohio, and moved to Cincinnati, Ohio to practice law in 1863, and in 1867 to Washington, D.C., where he died in 1885. He was interred at Glenwood Cemetery.

== Family life ==
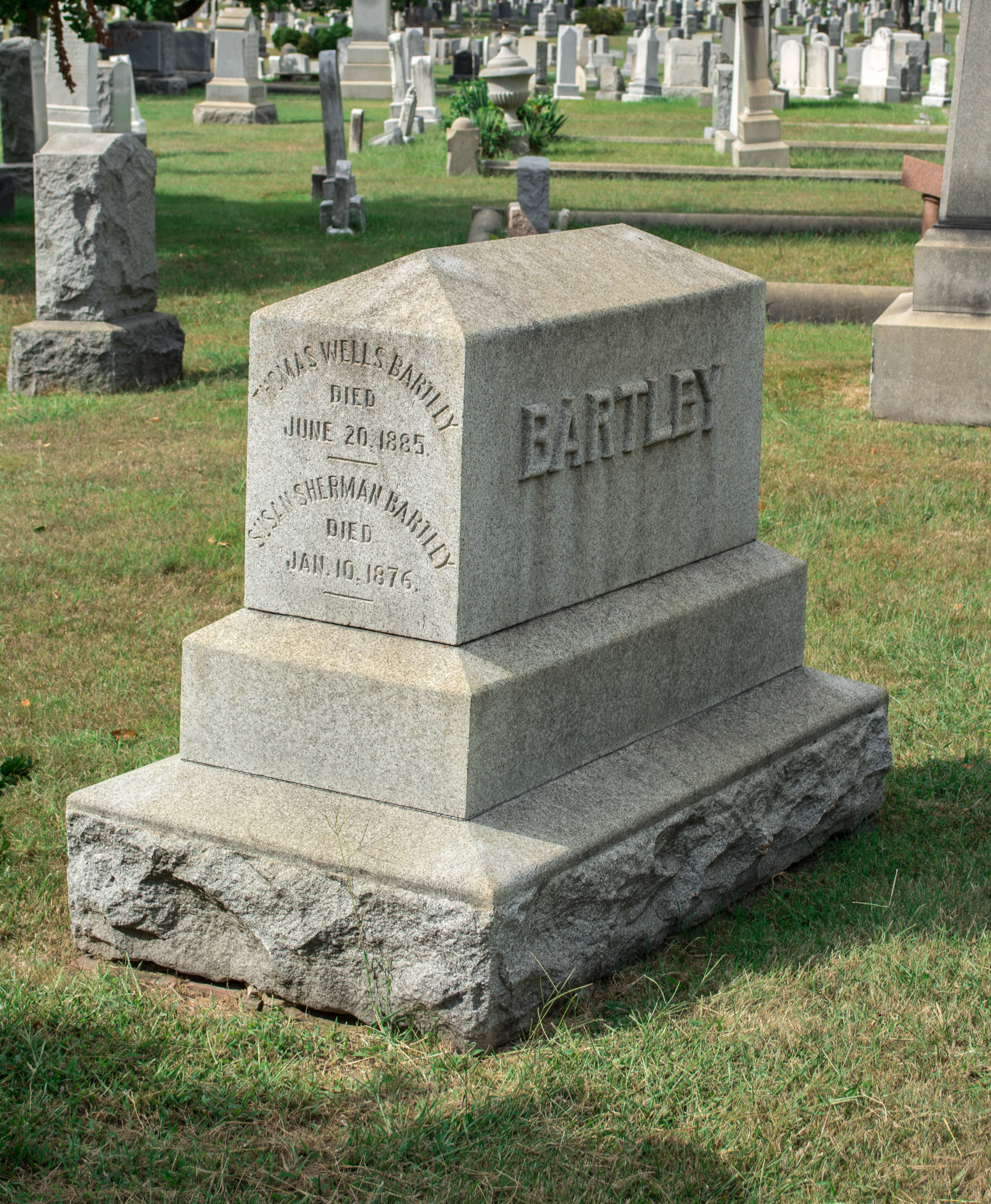
Grave of Thomas W. Bartley.

On October 9, 1837, Bartley married his first wife, Julia Maria Larwill, in Wooster, Ohio. Bartley married his second wife, Susan D. Sherman (October 10, 1825– January 10, 1876), sister of John Sherman and General William Tecumseh Sherman, on November 7, 1848,. Ellen McCoy, widow of one of General Sherman's staff officers, was his third wife.

== Death ==
Bartley was buried at Glenwood Cemetery in Washington, D.C.

Political offices
Preceded by Wilson Shannon	Governor of Ohio; 1844	Succeeded by Mordecai Bartley
Ohio Senate
Preceded by William McLaughlin	Senator from Richland County; 1841-1845	Succeeded by Joseph Newman
Ohio House of Representatives
Preceded by James Comings	Representative from Richland County; 1839-1841; Served alongside: Daniel Riblet	Succeeded by R. W. Cahill; James P. Henderson
Legal offices
Preceded by Rufus Paine Spalding	Ohio Supreme Court Judges; 2/1852-2/1859	Succeeded by William Virgil Peck
