= Mordecai Bartley =

American politician (1783–1870)

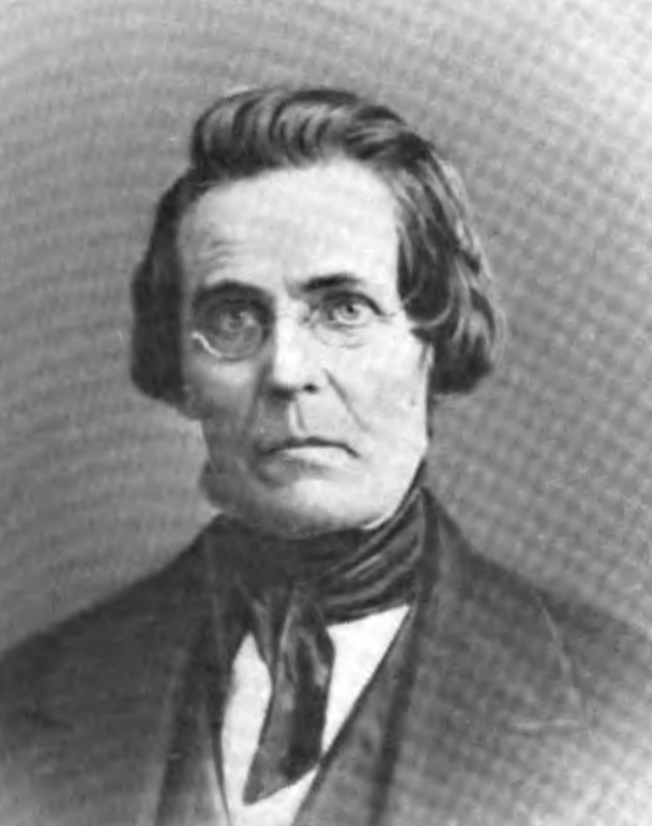

18th Governor of Ohio
- In office December 3, 1844 – December 12, 1846
- Preceded by: Thomas W. Bartley
- Succeeded by: William Bebb

Member of the U.S. House of Representatives from Ohio's 14th district
- In office March 4, 1823 – March 4, 1831
- Preceded by: new district
- Succeeded by: Eleutheros Cooke

Member of the Ohio Senate from the Coshocton district
- In office December 2, 1816 – December 6, 1818 Serving with Abraham Shane; Joseph Wampler
- Preceded by: William Gavit; Abraham Shane
- Succeeded by: John Spencer; Joseph Wampler

Personal details
- Born: December 16, 1783 Fayette County, Pennsylvania
- Died: October 10, 1870 (aged 86) Mansfield, Ohio, U.S.
- Resting place: Mansfield Cemetery
- Party: Whig

Mordecai Bartley (December 16, 1783 – October 10, 1870) was a Whig politician from northeastern Ohio. He served as the 18th governor of Ohio. Bartley succeeded his son, Thomas W. Bartley as governor, one of few instances of this happening in the United States in high offices.

== Biography ==
Bartley was born in Fayette County, Pennsylvania. After attending the local school in Virginia, he married Elizabeth Welles in 1804 and moved to Jefferson County, Ohio.

Bartley served as a captain, and then an adjutant during the War of 1812. Following his service under General William Henry Harrison in the War, Bartley moved to Richland County, Ohio, near Mansfield.

While farming, he was elected and served one term in the Ohio State Senate from 1816 to 1818. Elected to the United States House of Representatives in 1822, Bartley served four terms before declining to be renominated in 1830.

Bartley was an Ohio Whig Party Presidential elector in 1836 for William Henry Harrison.

He ran for governor in 1844 as a Whig after David Spangler, the original nominee, declined to run. Bartley served a single term from 1844 to 1846 before retiring again. While he was Governor, Ohio raised forty companies and 7,000 men for the Mexican–American War.

Political offices
Preceded by Thomas W. Bartley	Governor of Ohio; December 3, 1844-December 12, 1846	Succeeded by William Bebb
U.S. House of Representatives
Preceded by new district	United States Representative from Ohio's 14th congressional district March 4, 1823–March 3, 1831	Succeeded by Eleutheros Cooke
Ohio Senate
Preceded by William Gavit, Abraham Shane	Senator from Coshocton District; December 2, 1816-December 6, 1818; Served alongside: Abraham Shane, Joseph Wampler	Succeeded by John Spencer, Joseph Wampler
Party political offices
Preceded by Thomas Corwin	Whig Party nominee for Governor of Ohio; 1844	Succeeded by William Bebb
