= William Bebb =

19th Governor of Ohio

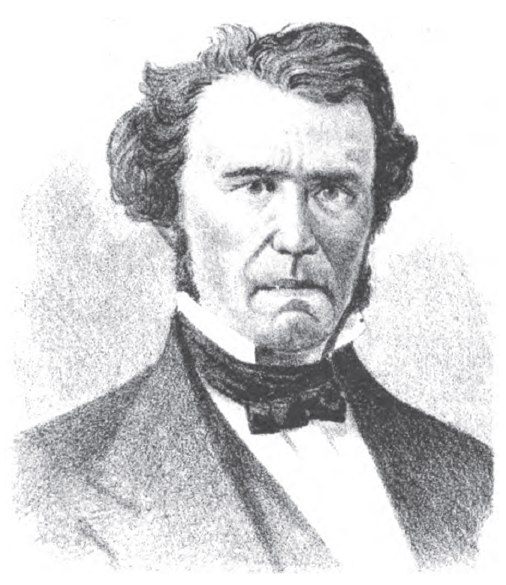

19th Governor of Ohio
- In office December 12, 1846 – January 22, 1849
- Preceded by: Mordecai Bartley
- Succeeded by: Seabury Ford

Personal details
- Born: December 8, 1802 Hamilton County, Northwest Territory (now Butler County, Ohio)
- Died: October 23, 1873 (aged 70) Rockford, Illinois, U.S.
- Party: Whig
- Spouse: Sarah Shuck
- Children: Michael Schuck Bebb
- Occupation: lawyer

William Bebb (December 8, 1802 – October 23, 1873) was a Whig politician from Ohio. He served as the 19th governor of Ohio from 1846 to 1849 and was the third native Ohioan to be elected to the office.

== Early life ==
Bebb was born in what was then Hamilton County in the Northwest Territory (his birthplace is now located in modern-day Butler County, Ohio) to Welsh immigrants, Edward Bebb and Margaret Roberts Owens. He was the first White person born in what is now Butler County. He is a distant relative of the Welsh writer Ambrose Bebb, whose ancestors stayed in Wales, and who would write a series of novels depicting Edward's migration from Wales and settlement in Ohio. Bebb's parents were early residents of Paddy's Run, now known as Shandon, Ohio. In 1826 the Paddy's Run school was organized under the new state law, a new building was erected, and William Bebb was employed as the first teacher.

On October 16, 1824 he married Sarah Shuck. In 1828, Bebb and his wife opened a boarding school for boys called the "Sycamore Grove School". While he taught school, Bebb studied for the bar and passed the state bar examination. He began practicing law in 1831 and worked in the office of John Woods.

== Career ==
Bebb was a devoted campaigner for William Henry Harrison in 1840, and for Henry Clay in 1844. Bebb was a Presidential elector in 1844 for Clay/Frelinghuysen.

Bebb was nominated by the Whigs in 1846 for the governorship, and served a single term beginning in December 1846. His term technically expired in December 1848, but was extended into January 1849 due to a number of close statewide elections which necessitated delaying the inauguration of a successor.

He was appointed by President Abraham Lincoln as examiner in the pension office at Washington, D.C. He declined an appointment as United States Diplomat to Tangier, Morocco in 1868.

== Death ==
After Bebb retired from politics, he and his wife moved to their farm in Rockford, Illinois. Bebb died at his home on October 23, 1873, and Sarah Bebb died on January 10, 1892.

Bebb was interred in Greenwood Cemetery in Rockford, Illinois.

== Trial of William Bebb ==
In 1857, Bebb fired a weapon and a man died. He was accused of manslaughter, and tried in Winnebago County, Illinois Circuit Court in 1858. One of his defense council summarized the case thus:

In the month of May, 1857, Michael Bebb, the second son of Gov. Bebb, had married a wife and brought her home to his father's house. On the night of the 18th, a company of young men, to the number of twelve, collected cow-bells, tin horns and other noise making instruments, together with a number of guns; and about 11 o'clock opened up a charivari, with cheers, ringing of bells, blowing of horns, rattling of pans and discharging of guns.
The family of Gov. Bebb had no previous intimation of what was intended, and were very much alarmed. The Governor took a double-barrel fowling-piece in his hands and went out, and ordered the rioters off his premises. They may not have heard him, by reason of the noise they were making, being in full concert when he went out. Be that as it may, they gave no heed to the warning. He then discharged one barrel of his gun at too great a distance to do any serious execution, and again warned them to be gone. All the company except four retreated. These four made a rush toward the Governor, apparently for the purpose of seizing him. He retreated a few paces, and, turning round, shot the foremost man dead on the spot.
The next morning he assembled the sheriff and other ministers of the law; showed them what was done; furnished them with the names of all the parties, so far as he had ascertained them in the meantime; and demanded an investigation. An investigation was held before the examining court, and the Governor was discharged.
Some months afterward, when he was in the city of Cincinnati on business, he learned through the newspapers that the Grand Jury of Winnebago County had indicted him for manslaughter. He immediately telegraphed the sheriff of the county, informing him where he was and when he would be home. He went home, surrendered himself and gave bail for his appearance.
The trial of the case was set for the 4th of February, 1858, and, in addition to the able council at home, he added the Hon. Thomas Corwin and Judge William Johnston, of Ohio, who were present, conducted the examination, and argued the case to the jury. The argument for the defense was opened by Gov. Corwin, in a speech replete with wit and eloquence. Immense numbers of people crowded to hear the trial, from various motives; chiefly to learn judicially how much an unoffending citizen might lawfully do in defense of his habituation and household when menaced by lawless assemblies.
The result, it is believed, was satisfactory to all well-disposed persons. Gov. Bebb was acquitted, notwithstanding an able and learned effort on the part of the People, in which everything was done, that talent and industry could do, to secure a conviction.

— William Johnston, 1887

A fable grew out of the trial, which had Tom Corwin coming to the county anonymously before the trial, and charming its occupants to the point that, when he represented Bebb, his good will with the residents assured an acquittal. A later examination of the trial record showed the story to be fanciful, with Corwin and Johnston winning acquittal through competent representation.

Party political offices
Preceded by Mordecai Bartley	Whig Party nominee for Governor of Ohio; 1846	Succeeded by Seabury Ford
