= Seabury Ford =

American politician (1801–1855)

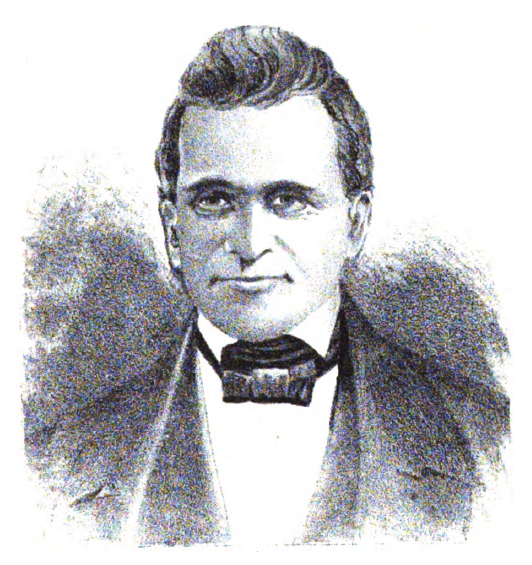

20th Governor of Ohio
- In office January 22, 1849 – December 12, 1850
- Preceded by: William Bebb
- Succeeded by: Reuben Wood

Member of the Ohio House of Representatives from the Geauga County district
- In office December 7, 1835 – December 5, 1841 Serving with four others
- Preceded by: Lewis Dille; Lester Taylor
- Succeeded by: John P. Converse

Member of the Ohio Senate from the Cuyahoga & Geauga counties district
- In office December 6, 1841 – December 3, 1843
- Preceded by: Richard Lord
- Succeeded by: Moses Kelley
- In office December 1, 1845 – December 5, 1847
- Preceded by: Moses Kelley
- Succeeded by: Franklin T. Backus

Personal details
- Born: October 15, 1801 Cheshire, Connecticut, U.S.
- Died: May 8, 1855 (aged 53) Burton, Ohio, U.S.
- Party: Whig
- Spouse: Harriet E. Cook
- Education: Yale University

Seabury Ford (October 15, 1801 – May 8, 1855) was a Whig politician from Ohio. He served as the 20th governor of Ohio and was the last Whig to serve as governor.

== Early life ==
Ford was born in Cheshire, Connecticut and moved to Burton, Ohio with his parents in 1804. He studied at Burton Academy, and then graduated from Yale University. While at Yale, he was elected by his classmates as class "bully", a term of honor for the physically strongest man in the class.

== Career ==
Ford graduated from Yale in 1825, returned to Ohio, and read law under the direction of his uncle, Judge Peter Hitchcock. He commenced the practice of law in 1827. While practicing law, Ford became involved in the state militia and was promoted to the rank of major general. Ford married Harriet E. Cook of Burton in 1828.

In 1835, Ford was elected to the Ohio House of Representatives from Geauga County. He held this position three times, and served as speaker for one term. From 1841 to 1848, he served in the Ohio State Senate.

After serving in the General Assembly, Ford was elected to the governorship in late 1848, by a margin of 311 votes out of nearly 300,000 cast. Ford served only a single term before returning home. His term was marred by fighting in a highly partisan Assembly that was divided over issues related to slavery and the Mexican–American War, as well as by a cholera epidemic that swept through Columbus.

== Death ==
On the first Sunday after his retirement, Ford suffered a stroke and was stricken by paralysis, from which he never recovered. He died at his home in Burton in 1855 when he was 53 years old. Ford is interred at Welton Cemetery in Burton, Ohio.

Political offices
Preceded by William Bebb	Governor of Ohio; 1849–1850	Succeeded by Reuben Wood
Party political offices
Preceded by William Bebb	Whig Party nominee for Governor of Ohio; 1848	Succeeded by William Johnston
