= Reuben Wood =

American judge

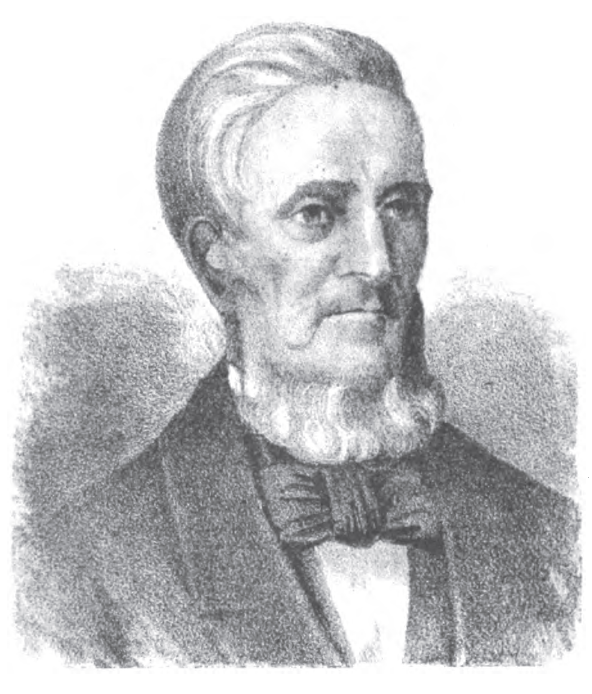

21st Governor of Ohio
- In office December 12, 1850 – July 13, 1853
- Lieutenant: William Medill (1852–1853)
- Preceded by: Seabury Ford
- Succeeded by: William Medill

Justice of the Ohio Supreme Court
- In office February 6, 1833 – February 1847
- Preceded by: Peter Hitchcock
- Succeeded by: Edward Avery

Member of the Ohio Senate from the Cuyahoga & other counties district
- In office December 5, 1825 – December 5, 1830
- Preceded by: Jabez Wright; Samuel Wheeler; Aaron Norton
- Succeeded by: John W. Willey

Personal details
- Born: 1792 or 1793 Middletown Springs, Vermont, US
- Died: October 1, 1864 (aged 71–72) Cleveland, Ohio, US
- Resting place: Woodland Cemetery, Cleveland
- Party: Democratic
- Spouse: Mary Rice
- Children: 2
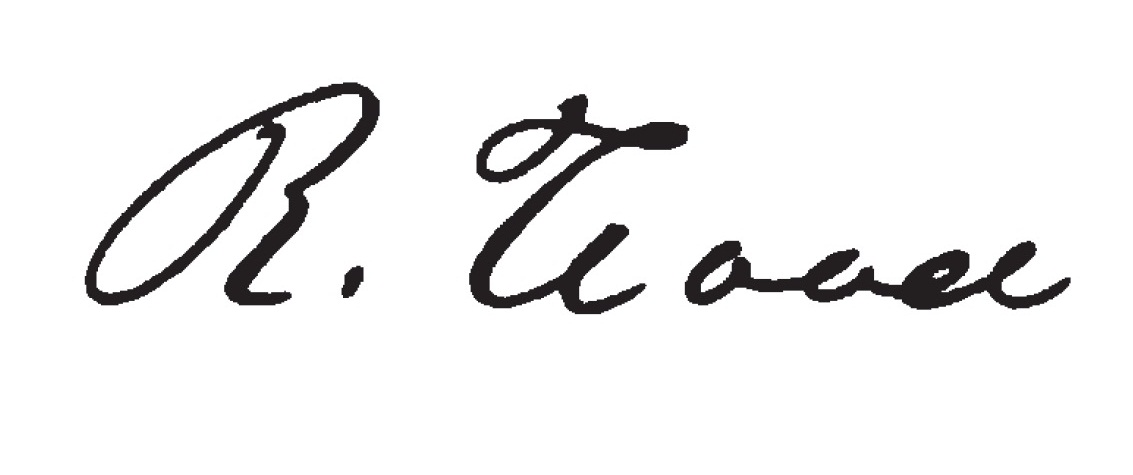
- Signature

Reuben Wood (1792/1793 – October 1, 1864) was a Democratic politician from the U.S. state of Ohio. He served as the 21st governor of Ohio.

== Biography ==
Wood was born near Middletown, Vermont, in either 1792 or 1793. While living with an uncle in Canada after his father died, Wood was conscripted into the Canadian Army at the outset of the War of 1812, but escaped across Lake Ontario and briefly served in the Vermont militia.

== Career ==
Wood moved to Cleveland, Ohio – then a tiny village of 600 residents – in 1818 with his wife and infant daughter. He reputedly arrived with only $1.25 left to his name to work as a lawyer. He served in the Ohio State Senate from 1825 to 1830. In 1830, he was elected President Judge of the third judicial circuit. He served on the Common Pleas Court bench from 1830 to 1833.

Wood was elected in 1833 to the Ohio Supreme Court, and served two seven-year terms from 1833 to 1847. He was defeated in a bid for a third term by a Whig candidate. He took office in late 1850 as governor. His first term was cut short by the implementation of a new state constitution, and he was re-elected in late 1851, re-inaugurated in early 1852. He resigned on July 13, 1853, to take a position as the American consul in Valparaíso, Chile. He remained there until 1855, when he retired to Cleveland.

Wood married Mary Rice, of Clarendon, Vermont, in 1816 or 1817. They had two daughters.

Wood was known as The tall chief of the Cuyahogas, or Cuyahoga Chief, or Old Cuyahoga Chief, or Old Chief of the Cuyahogas.

== Death ==
Wood died at his farm, Evergreen Place, eight miles west of Cleveland, on October 1, 1864, from bilious colic. He was initially interred on the farm, and was later reburied at Woodland Cemetery in Cleveland.

== Bibliography ==
- "Wood, Reuben" . Appletons' Cyclopædia of American Biography. 1900.
- Wickham, Gertrude Van Rensselaer (1914). The Pioneer Families of Cleveland, 1796-1840. Cleveland: Evangelical Publishing House.

Political offices
Preceded by Seabury Ford	Governor of Ohio; 1850–1853	Succeeded by William Medill
Legal offices
Preceded by Peter Hitchcock	Ohio Supreme Court Judges; 1833–1847	Succeeded by Edward Avery
Party political offices
Preceded by John B. Weller	Democratic Party nominee for Governor of Ohio; 1850, 1851	Succeeded by William Medill
