= John Leavitt (disambiguation) =

John Leavitt may refer to:

- John Leavitt (1608–1691), American pioneer; founding deacon of the oldest church in continuous use in the U.S.
- John Leavitt (Ohio settler) (1755–1815), early settler of Ohio's Western Reserve lands
- John Leavitt (politician), member of the New Hampshire House of Representatives
- John Wheeler Leavitt (1790–1870), New York City businessman; grandfather of portraitist Cecilia Beaux
- John McDowell Leavitt (1824–1909), American academic and Episcopal clergyman
- John Hooker Leavitt (1831–1906), American banker and Iowa state senator
- John Brooks Leavitt (1849–1930), New York City attorney, author and reformer; son of John McDowell Leavitt
- John Faunce Leavitt (1905–1974), American marine artist and museum curator
- John Leavitt (composer) (born 1956), American composer

== See also ==
- Jonathan Leavitt (1764–1830), Massachusetts attorney, judge, state senator
- Jonathan Leavitt (minister) (1731–1802), New England Congregational minister
- Jonathan Leavitt (publisher) (1797–1852), American bookbinder
