= William Blackstone Hubbard =

American politician (1795–1866)

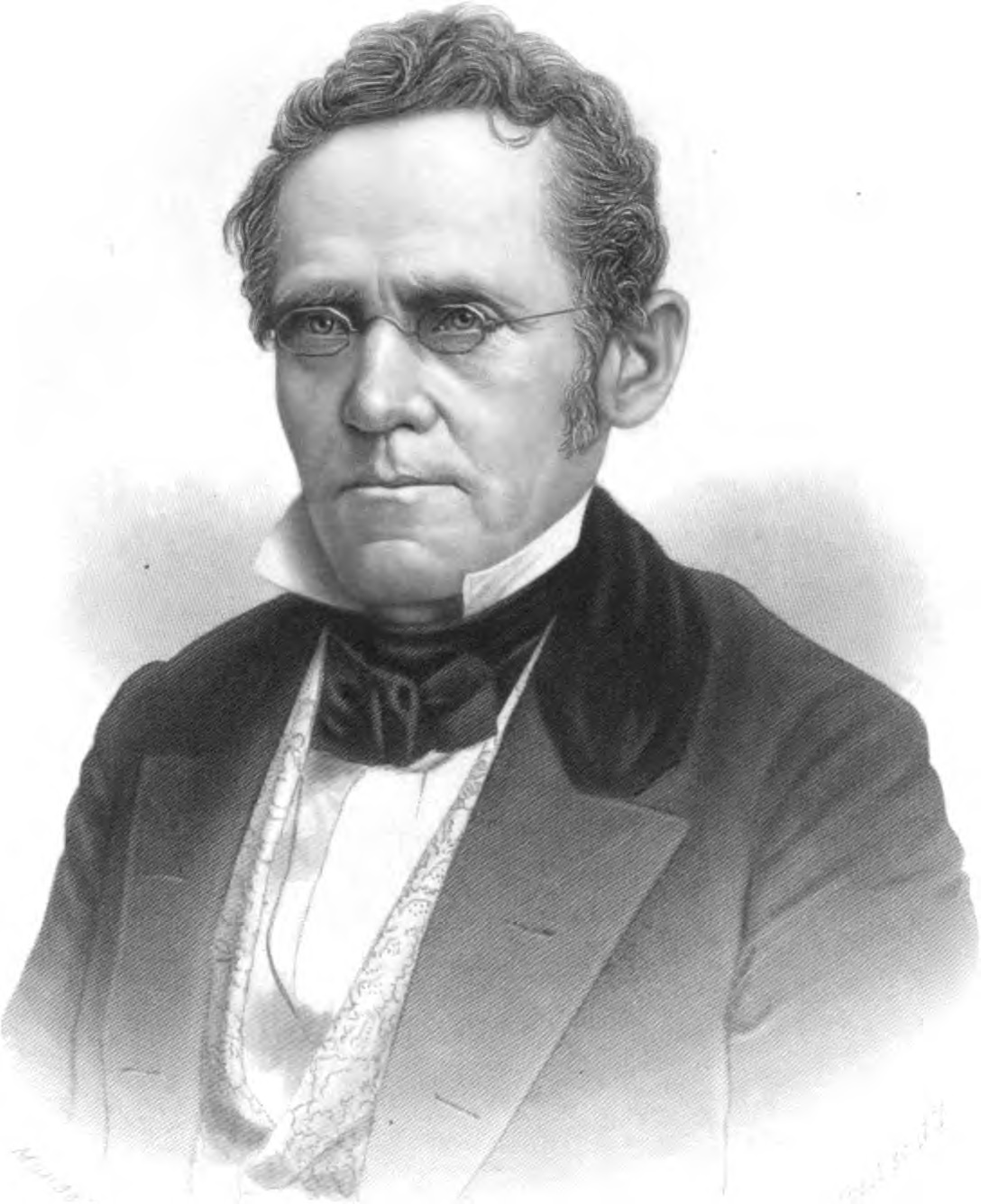

Speaker of the Ohio House of Representatives
- In office December 5, 1831 – December 2, 1832
- Preceded by: James Martin Bell
- Succeeded by: David T. Disney

Personal details
- Born: August 26, 1795 Utica, New York, U.S.
- Died: January 5, 1866 (aged 70) Columbus, Ohio, U.S.
- Resting place: Green Lawn Cemetery
- Party: Whig Party
- Spouse: Margaret Johnston
- Children: nine
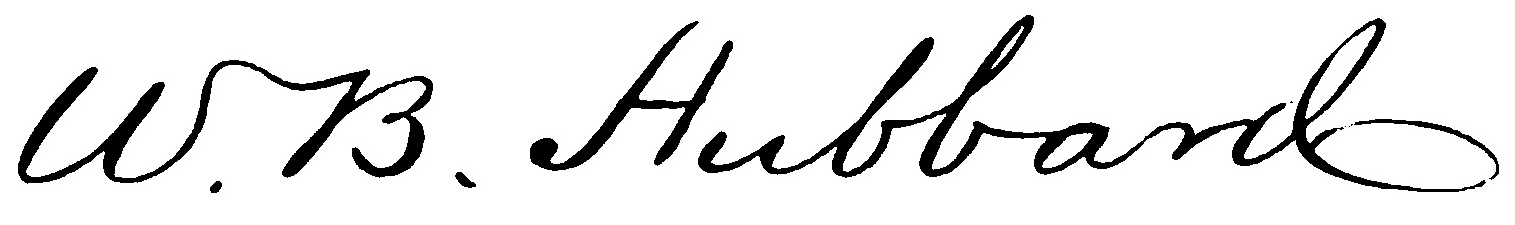
- Signature

William Blackstone Hubbard (August 26, 1795 – January 5, 1866) was a politician, railroad president, banker and Masonic Grand Master in the U.S state of Ohio.

== Youth and legislative career ==
William B. Hubbard was born in Utica, New York on August 26, 1795. His parents were Bela and Naomi (Stow) Hubbard. The Stows were an old Connecticut family. He received a thorough education and read law with his maternal uncle, Silas Stow. He was admitted to the New York bar, and moved to St. Clairsville, Belmont County, Ohio in 1816.

Hubbard was Belmont County Prosecuting Attorney for several years and was then elected to the Ohio State Senate for the 26th and 27th General Assemblies, serving 1827 to 1829. In February 1830, a bill he had drafted titled "An Act to incorporate the Ohio Canal and Steubenville Railroad Company" was passed. This was the first railroad legislation in Ohio, and came before a railroad with steam powered locomotive was operational anywhere.

In 1831, Hubbard was elected to the Ohio House of Representatives for the 30th General Assembly and he was re-elected to the 31st, serving 1831 to 1833. For the 30th General Assembly, he was elected Speaker of the House. He was said to have "presided over the deliberations of that body with distinguished dignity and capability". He was originally a Whig and later became a Republican.

== Life in Columbus ==
Hubbard was the president of the bank in St. Clairsville when he moved to Columbus, Ohio in 1839. He was named president of the Exchange Bank of Columbus, and organized and was president of the First National Bank of Columbus. He was president of the Columbus and Xenia Railroad, and was a director or official of other rail companies. He was a trustee of Ohio University from 1834 to 1865. He was consulted on financial matters by Salmon P. Chase when he was Governor and Secretary of the Treasury.

== Masonic activities ==
On a visit to New York, Hubbard received his Master Mason degree at Rising Sun Lodge No. 125 on September 12, 1821. He was admitted to Belmont Lodge No. 16 at St. Clairville on October 17, 1821. He became a member of Zanesville, Ohio Chapter No. 9, Royal Arch Masons on August 26, 1822.

In 1841 Hubbard was knighted in Lancaster Encampment. In 1842 he was elected Grand High Priest of the Grand Chapter of Ohio. He was General Grand Master of the General Grand Encampment of the United States for twelve years beginning in 1847. He was Grand Master of the Grand Lodge of Ohio 1850, 1851, and 1852.

== Personal ==
Hubbard married Mary Margaret Johnston of St. Clairsville on January 2, 1817. They had eight or nine children. He died at Columbus on January 5, 1866. He was buried at Green Lawn Cemetery.

== Notes ==
Ohio Senate
Preceded by John Davenport	Senator from Belmont County; December 3, 1827 – December 6, 1829	Succeeded by Thomas Shannon
Ohio House of Representatives
Preceded by Andrew Crockett; John Davenport; James Alexander, Jr.	Representative from Belmont County; December 5, 1831 – December 1, 1833; Served alongside: John Patton; William Workman	Succeeded by John Thompson; Joseph A. Ramage
