= James Alexander Jr. =

American politician (1789–1846)

Member of the U.S. House of Representatives from Ohio's 11th district
- In office March 4, 1837 – March 3, 1839
- Preceded by: James Martin Bell
- Succeeded by: Isaac Parrish

Member of the Ohio House of Representatives from the Belmont County district
- In office December 6, 1830 – December 4, 1831 Serving with Andrew Crockett; John Davenport
- Preceded by: James Weir; Crawford Welsh; Andrew Patterson
- Succeeded by: John Patton; William Workman; W. B. Hubbard

Personal details
- Born: October 17, 1789 Delta, Pennsylvania, U.S.
- Died: September 5, 1846 (aged 56) McNabb, Illinois, U.S.
- Resting place: Scotch Ridge Cemetery, Belmont County, Ohio
- Party: Whig

James Alexander Jr. (October 17, 1789 – September 5, 1846) was a United States representative from Ohio. Born near Delta, Pennsylvania, he moved to the Northwest Territory in 1799 with his father, who settled in what is now St. Clairsville, Ohio. He engaged in agricultural pursuits, in river transportation on the Ohio and Mississippi Rivers, and, later, in mercantile pursuits in St. Clairsville. He was a member of the Ohio House of Representatives in 1830 and again in 1833 and 1834, and served as associate judge of the Court of Common Pleas in 1831.

Alexander was elected as a Whig to the Twenty-fifth Congress, holding office from March 4, 1837 to March 3, 1839. He was an unsuccessful candidate for reelection in 1838 to the Twenty-sixth Congress, and returned to St. Clairsville and resumed his former business pursuits; he purchased a large tract of property in Wheeling, Virginia (now West Virginia) in 1843 and moved to that city, living in retirement until his death. He was an extensive owner of farming land in the State of Illinois. He died, while visiting his son in McNabb, Illinois in 1846; interment was in Scotch Ridge Cemetery, eight miles north of St. Clairsville.

U.S. House of Representatives
Preceded by William Kennon, Sr.	Member of the U.S. House of Representatives from Ohio's 11th congressional district 1837–1839	Succeeded by Isaac Parrish
