= LaBrae Local School District =

Location
- 1001 N Leavitt Rd; Leavittsburg, Ohio, 44430; United States

Information
- Funding type: Public
- Established: 1970
- Superintendent: Anthony J. Calderone
- Staff: 14.61 (FTE)
- Enrollment: 999 (2024-25)
- Student to teacher ratio: 68.36
- Colors: Scarlet and Grey
- Mascot: Viking
- Website: District Website

The LaBrae Local School District is a school district located in Leavittsburg, Trumbull County, Ohio United States. The school district serves one high school, one junior high school, one middle school and one elementary school.

== History ==
The LaBrae Local School District was formed in 1970 following the consolidation of the Leavittsburg and Braceville Local School Districts. The district name comes from the combination of the two towns names, Leavittsburg and Braceville.

Bascom Elementary was opened in 1954, before consolidation and remains the only school left in the district from before the consolidation.

In 2005, LaBrae closed all their schools aside from Bascom Elementary to build a new campus located on North Leavitt Road. The closed buildings were demolished in 2006.

In 2020, LaBrae completed a $143,000 renovation to Bascom Elementary for school safety. The school gymnasium was renamed in 2023 in honor of Alfred Lopez, a former staff member who was a science teacher and coach form the former Braceville High School, who late served as a principal and superintendent at LaBrae Local Schools. He retired in 1987.

== Schools ==
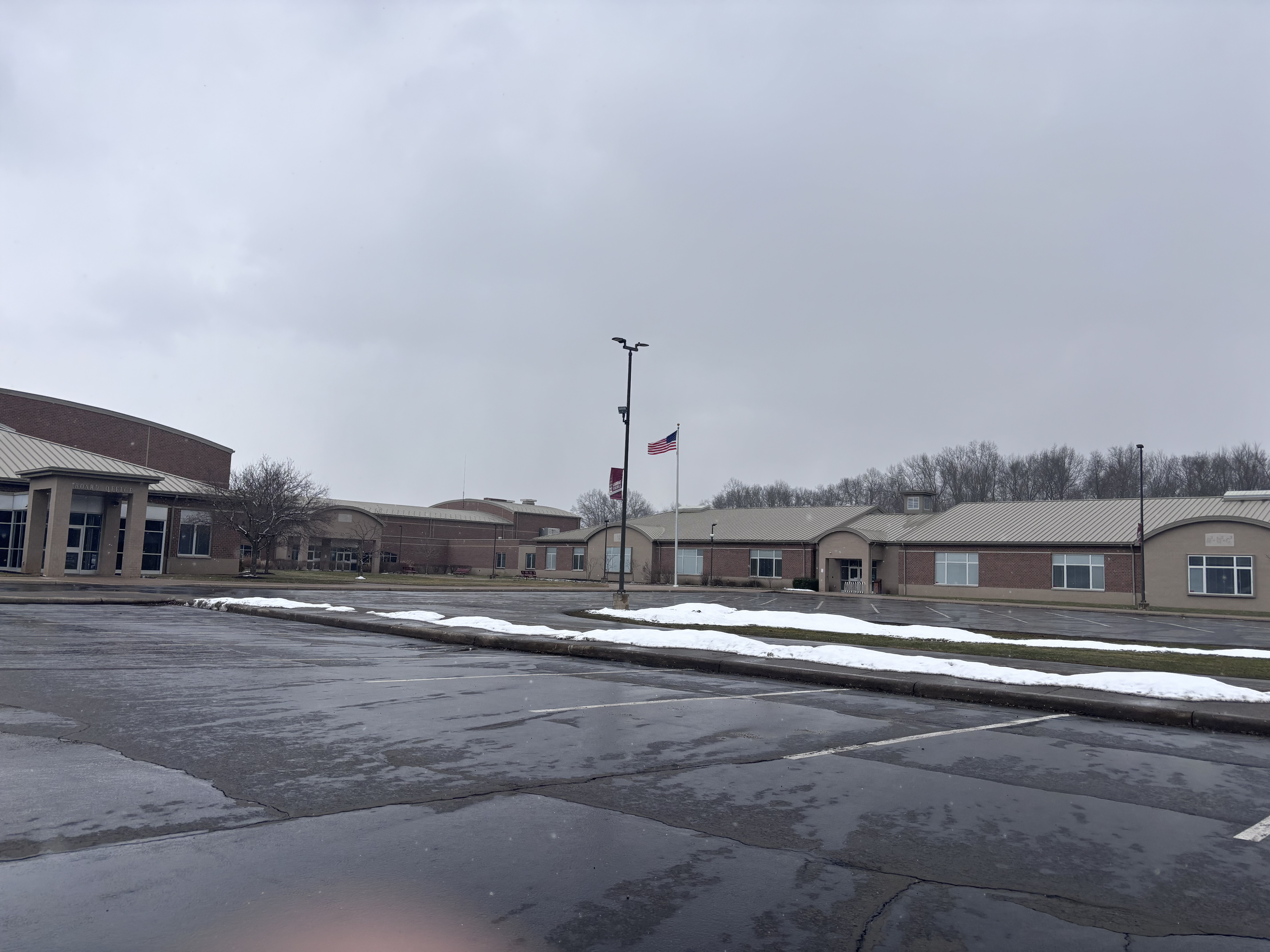
LaBrae High School

Schools within the district consist of:

=== High School ===
- LaBrae High School

=== Middle School ===
- LaBrae Intermediate School
- LaBrae Middle School

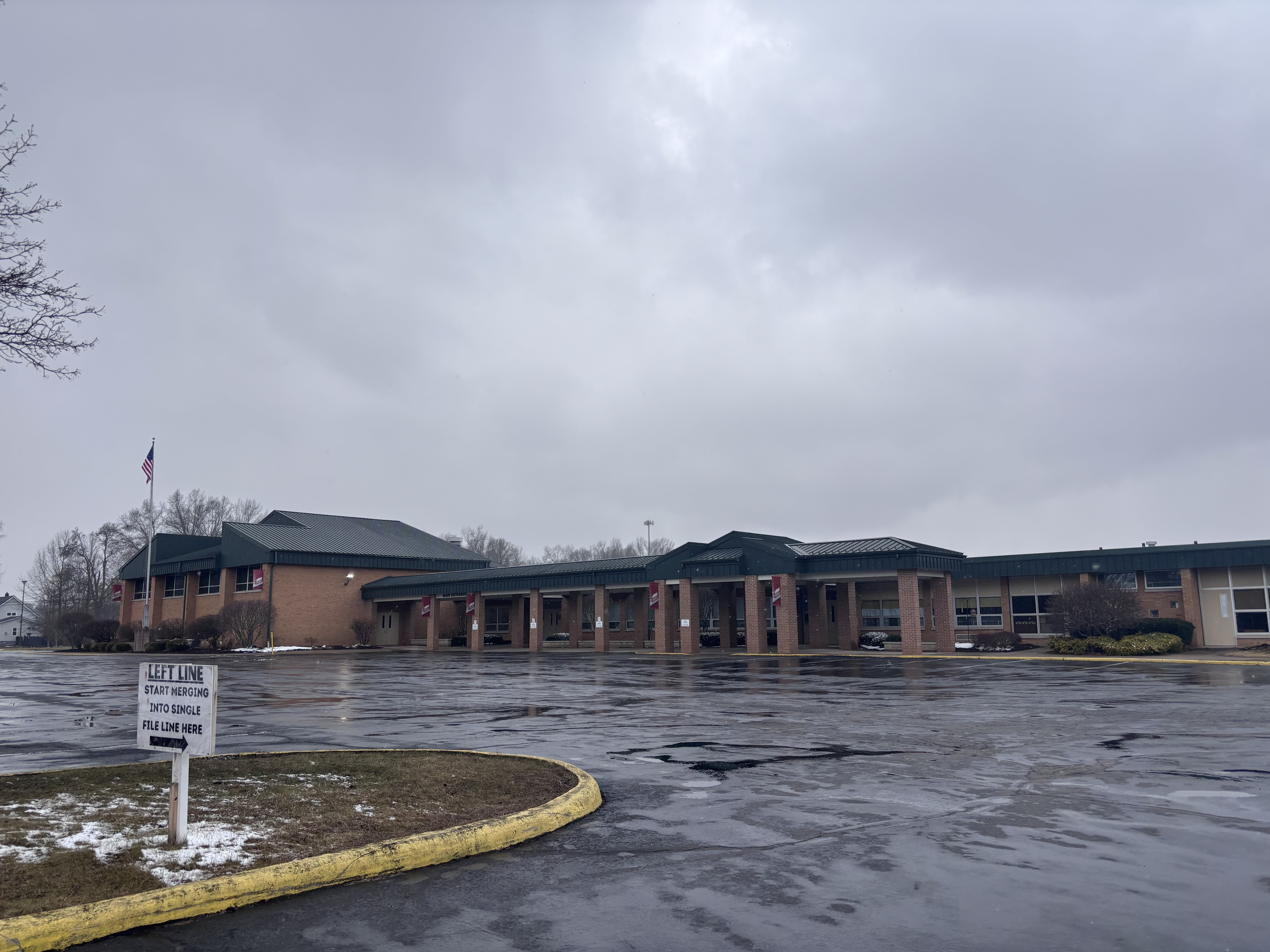
Bascom Elementary School

=== Elementary School ===
- Bascom Elementary School
