= J. Foster Wilkin =

American judge

James Foster Wilkin
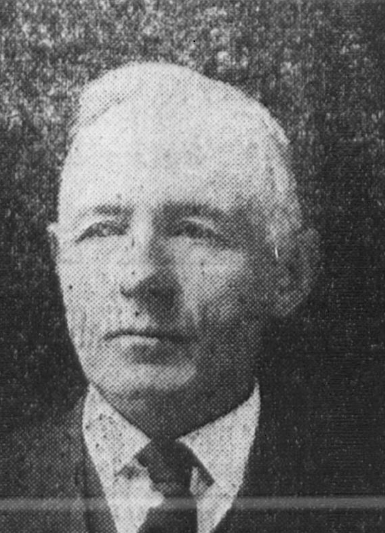

Associate Justice of the Ohio Supreme Court
- In office December 20, 1912 – December 4, 1914
- Preceded by: Joseph W. O'Hara
- Succeeded by: Thomas A. Jones

Personal details
- Born: February 26, 1853 Hollidays Cove, Virginia
- Died: December 4, 1914 (aged 61) New Philadelphia, Ohio
- Resting place: Canal Dover Cemetery
- Party: Democratic
- Spouse: Virginia Smith
- Children: Ten
- Education: Washington & Jefferson College; College of Wooster; University of Virginia School of Law

James Foster Wilkin (February 26, 1853 – December 4, 1914) was a lawyer in the U.S. State of Ohio who was an Ohio Supreme Court Judge from 1912 to his death.

== Biography ==
J. Foster Wilkin was born in 1853 at Hollidays Cove, Virginia (now West Virginia). His parents moved to Newcomerstown, Ohio, where he attended the local schools. He studied at Washington & Jefferson College and the College of Wooster. At Washington & Jefferson he was a member of the Beta Theta Pi. He studied law at the University of Virginia, and had a thirty five year practice at New Philadelphia, Ohio. He married Virginia Smith of Newcomerstown, Ohio, who died in 1919. Wilkin was associated with two of his sons in private practice, David R. and Robert Nugen Wilkin, under the name Wilkin and Wilkin. He was elected Tuscarawas County Prosecuting Attorney in 1882, 1884 and 1886.

An election was held autumn 1912 to fill the unexpired term of James Latimer Price to the Ohio Supreme Court, and Wilkin assumed his seat upon election December 20, 1912. He ran for re-election in 1914, but lost. He died before he could complete his term. He died December 4, 1914, at New Philadelphia, where he had gone to "recuperate from a slight indisposition" His funeral was at the Presbyterian Church in New Philadelphia and burial was at the Canal Dover Cemetery.

He had eight or ten children. His son, Robert Nugen Wilkin, would later be chosen for the Supreme Court.

== See also ==
- List of justices of the Ohio Supreme Court
