= Jacob Brinkerhoff =

American judge (1810–1880)

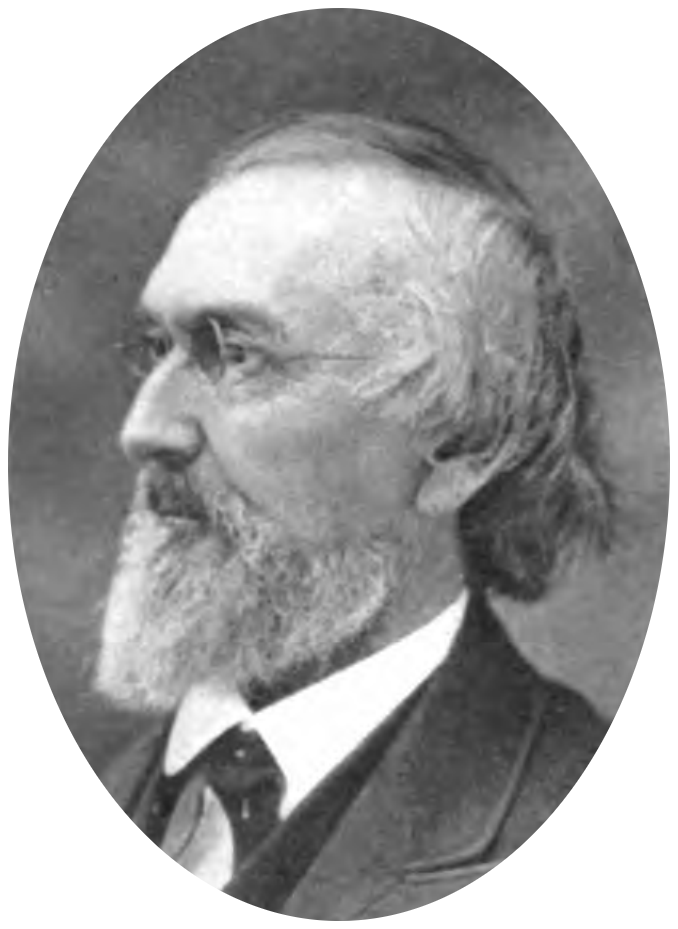

Member of the U.S. House of Representatives from Ohio's 11th district
- In office March 4, 1843 – March 3, 1847
- Preceded by: Benjamin S. Cowen
- Succeeded by: John K. Miller

Ohio Supreme Court Justice
- In office February 9, 1856 – February 9, 1871
- Preceded by: William Kennon, Sr.
- Succeeded by: George W. McIlvaine

Personal details
- Born: August 31, 1810 Niles, New York, U.S.
- Died: July 19, 1880 (aged 69) Mansfield, Ohio, U.S.
- Resting place: Mansfield Cemetery
- Party: Democratic; Republican
- Spouses: Caroline Campbell; Marian Titus
- Children: four

Jacob Brinkerhoff (August 31, 1810 – July 19, 1880) was an American jurist, Congressman, and author of the Wilmot Proviso. He served two terms in the U.S. House of Representatives from 1843 to 1847.

== Life and career ==
Brinkerhoff was born in Niles, Cayuga County, New York. He was schooled at the academy at Prattsburgh, New York, and studied law in the office of Howell and Bro. Two years later he moved to Mansfield, Ohio, where in 1837 he was admitted to the bar and began to practice in partnership with Thomas W. Bartley. In October of that year he married Carolina Campbell, who died in 1839. He then married Marian Titus, of Detroit, Michigan, by whom he had two sons and two daughters.

=== Congress ===
He was prosecuting attorney for Richland County, Ohio, from 1839 to 1843, and was then elected as a Democrat to the Twenty-eighth and Twenty-ninth Congresses (March 4, 1843 – March 3, 1847), where he was chairman of the Committee on Invalid Pensions (Twenty-eighth Congress). He became affiliated with the Free Soil Party and drew up the famous resolution known as the Wilmot Proviso; the original draft in his handwriting is in the Congressional Library.

Several copies of this resolution were made and distributed among the Free Soil members of Congress, with the understanding that whoever among them should catch the speaker's eye and get the floor should introduce it. David Wilmot chanced to be that man, and, therefore, the proviso bears his name instead of Brinkerhoff's.

=== Later career ===
At the close of his Congressional career, he resumed his law practice at Mansfield. In 1856, he was elected to Ohio Supreme Court, where he served as Chief Justice from 1859 until 1871, being succeeded by Josiah Scott. He dissented in the Oberlin-Wellington Rescue case of 1858, a test of the Fugitive Slave Law, arguing that slavery was solely a state institution, that should enjoy no protection at the federal level. He became affiliated with the Republican Party on its formation in 1856, and was an alternate delegate to Republican National Convention from Ohio in 1868.

=== Death and burial ===
He died in Mansfield, and was buried in Mansfield Cemetery.

== Personal life ==
Brinkerhoff was the son of Henry I. Brinkerhoff (1786–1847) and his wife, Rachel (née Bevier) Brinkerhoff (1792–1826). Through his mother, he descends from three patentees, or founders, of New Paltz, New York: Louis Bevier, Simon LeFevre and Louis DuBois. His maternal grandfather, Andries Bevier, served as Supervisor of the town of Rochester, Ulster, New York.

His first cousin, once removed was Henry R. Brinkerhoff, also a Congressman from Ohio.

U.S. House of Representatives
Preceded by Benjamin S. Cowen	United States Representative from Ohio's 11th congressional district 1843–1847	Succeeded by John K. Miller
Legal offices
Preceded by William Kennon, Sr.	Associate Justice of the Ohio Supreme Court; 1856–1871	Succeeded by George W. McIlvaine
