= George W. McIlvaine =

American judge

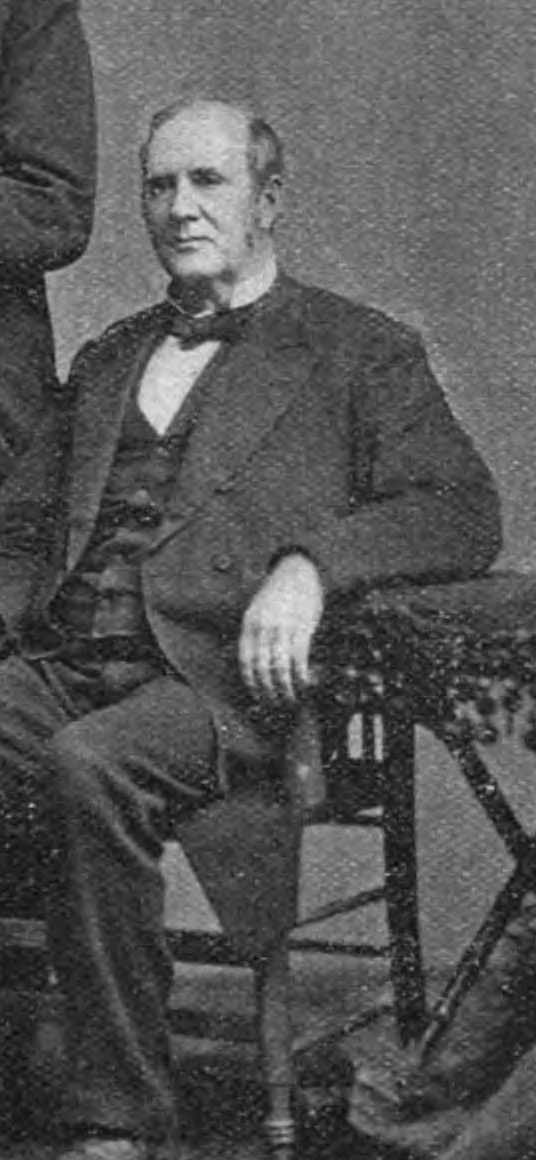

Associate Justice of the Ohio Supreme Court
- In office February 9, 1871 – February 9, 1886
- Preceded by: Jacob Brinkerhoff
- Succeeded by: Thaddeus A. Minshall

Personal details
- Born: July 14, 1822 Washington County, Pennsylvania, US
- Died: December 22, 1887 (aged 65) New Philadelphia, Ohio, US
- Party: Republican
- Spouses: Jane M. Robb; Caroline Rinehart; Ursula L. Brush Higgins
- Children: four

George W. McIlvaine (July 14, 1822 – December 22, 1887) was a Republican politician in the U.S. state of Ohio who was an Ohio Supreme Court Judge 1871–1886.

== Life and career ==
George W. McIlvaine was born at Washington County, Pennsylvania, on a farm. He attended country schools. At age 23 he was admitted to the bar, and moved to New Philadelphia, Ohio, where he had a legal practice, and where he lived the rest of his life. He established a practice with Joseph Medill, and they purchased the Coshocton Whig newspaper in 1849. Medill soon after left they law partnership and took sole ownership of the paper, which he renamed the Coshocton Republican in 1855. Medill later sold it, moved to Chicago, and brought the Chicago Tribune.

McIlvaine was first elected Justice of the Peace of Goshen Township, Tuscarawas County, Ohio, in 1849, and was elected to a one year term as Mayor of New Philadelphia in 1851. In 1861, McIlvaine was elected a Judge of the Common Pleas, and re-elected in 1866 unopposed. At the 1870 Republican State Convention, he finally won nomination for Judge on the Ohio Supreme Court on the fifth ballot, and defeated his Democratic opponent Richard A. Harrison and a third party candidate. He won re-election in 1875 and 1880. Failing health compelled him to decline re-nomination in 1885. He died at New Philadelphia December 22, 1887. His immediate cause of death was a stroke after an extended illness.

McIlvaine was first married to Jane M. Robb in Florence, Pennsylvania. They had one son. His second wife was Caroline Rinehart of New Philadelphia. They raised three children before she died in 1878. His third wife was Ursula L. Brush Higgins, whom he married in Cleveland. They had no children. She died February 6, 1918, in Elyria, and is buried at Ridgeview Cemetery in North Ridgeville.

== Notes ==
Legal offices
| Preceded by Jacob Brinkerhoff | Associate Justice of the Ohio Supreme Court; 1871–1886 | Succeeded by Thaddeus A. Minshall |
