= The Church Review and Ecclesiastical Register =

Episcopal American journal

The Church Review and Ecclesiastical Register was an Episcopal American journal publishing (under a number of different names) on theological and religious matters from 1848 until 1891. The journal was founded by Nathaniel Smith Richardson. It was initially published in New Haven and became one of the leading publications in the American Episcopal Church. It was quarterly, monthly, and bimonthly during its publication history. The journal stopped publishing in 1891.

== Publication names ==
- The Church Review and Ecclesiastical Register (April 1848 – April 1858; again from April 1886 – October 1889)
- The American Quarterly Church Review and Ecclesiastical Register (July 1858 – January 1870)
- The American Quarterly Church Review (April 1870 – October 1871)
- [The American Church Quarterly Review, possibly a misprint, attested in 1892]
- The American Church Review (January 1872 – April 1885)
- The Church Review (July 1885 – January 1889; again from January 1890 – October 1891)

== Editors and contributors ==
=== Editors ===
- Nathaniel Smith Richardson (1848–1868)
- John McDowell Leavitt (1868–1871)
- M.H. Mallory (1872–1874)
- Edward B. Boggs (1875–1880)
- Henry Mason Baum (1881–1891)

=== Contributors ===
- Oliver Starr Taylor
- John Williams
