= Joseph W. O'Hara =

American judge

Joseph William O'Hara
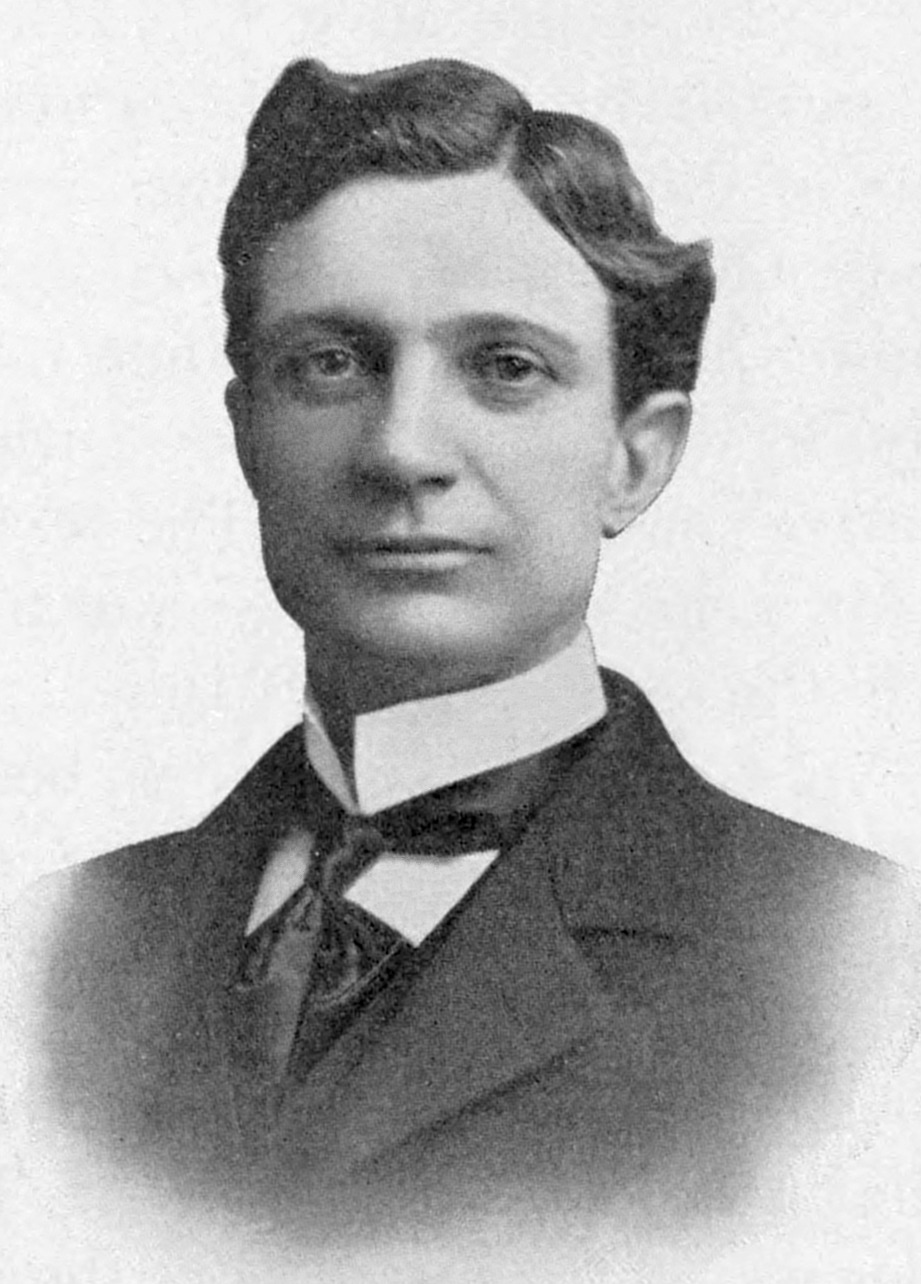

Associate Justice of the Ohio Supreme Court
- In office April 17, 1912 – December 20, 1912
- Appointed by: Judson Harmon
- Preceded by: James Latimer Price
- Succeeded by: J. Foster Wilkin

Personal details
- Born: August 2, 1863 Cincinnati, Ohio, U.S.
- Died: September 20, 1938 (aged 75) Cincinnati, Ohio, U.S.
- Resting place: Spring Grove Cemetery
- Party: Democratic
- Spouse: Lucille Hazen
- Education: Cincinnati Law School

Joseph William O'Hara (August 2, 1863 – September 20, 1938) was a lawyer from Cincinnati, Ohio, United States who was appointed to a vacancy on the Ohio Supreme Court for a few months in 1912. He chose not to run for re-election.

== Biography ==
Joseph W. O'Hara was born in Cincinnati, Ohio on August 2, 1863 to insurance agent William Austin O'Hara and his wife Elise (Halm) O'Hara. He graduated from Hughes High School in 1880 and from Cincinnati Law School in 1884 with an LL.B. Along with Isaac M. Jordan, Jr., he joined Isaac M. Jordan, Sr. to form the Cincinnati firm Jordan, Jordan & O'Hara. When the elder Jordan died, he established O'Hara and Jordan, and practiced alone after the younger Jordan moved to Chicago.

The Democrats encouraged O'Hara to run for judge, but the only office he held was as a member of the Cincinnati Board of Education for ten years. In March, 1912, James Latimer Price of the Ohio Supreme Court died. Governor, and fellow Cincinnati Democrat, Judson Harmon appointed O'Hara to fill the seat until a replacement could be elected to finish Price's term.

O'Hara chose not to run for the remainder of the term in November, 1912. J. Foster Wilkin won that election, and O'Hara's service ended December 20, 1912, when Wilkin assumed the seat. O'Hara returned to Cincinnati and his private practice. In 1936, he was appointed General Counsel of the Home Owners' Loan Corporation.

O'Hara was a member of the Cincinnati, Ohio, and American Bar Associations. He was president of the Cincinnati Bar Association 1931–1932, and was a trustee of the Cincinnati Law Library Association.

O'Hara was married to Lucille Hazen in July, 1899 in Cincinnati. They had no children. He died at his home September 20, 1938. The funeral was a requiem high mass at St. Xavier Catholic Church, with burial at Spring Grove Cemetery.
