= Thaddeus A. Minshall =

American judge (1834–1908)

Thaddeus Armstrong Minshall
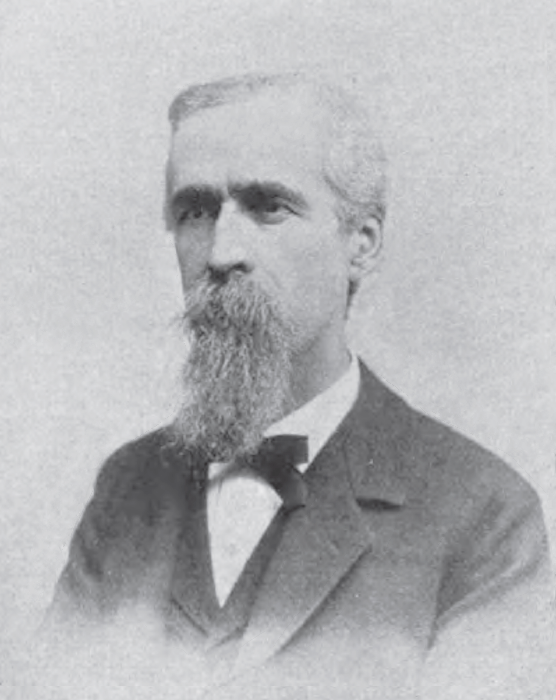

Justice of the Ohio Supreme Court
- In office February 9, 1886 – February 9, 1902
- Preceded by: George W. McIlvaine
- Succeeded by: James Latimer Price

Personal details
- Born: January 19, 1834 Hallsville, Ohio, U.S.
- Died: November 22, 1908 (aged 74) Chillicothe, Ohio, U.S.
- Resting place: Grandview Cemetery
- Party: Republican
- Spouse: Julia Ewing Pearson
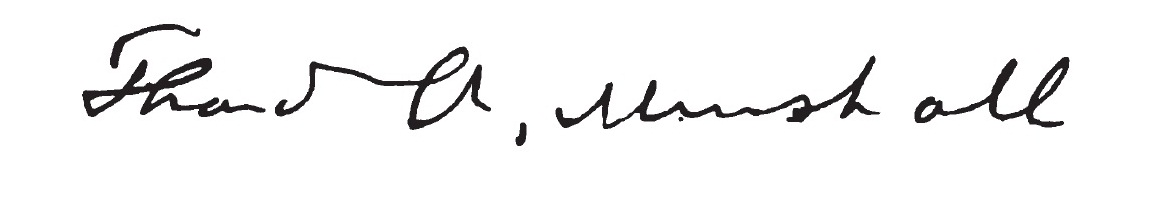
- Signature

Military service
- Allegiance: United States
- Branch/service: (United States) Union Army
- Years of service: 1861–1864
- Rank: Captain
- Unit: 22nd Ohio Infantry; 33rd Ohio Infantry

Thaddeus Armstrong Minshall (January 19, 1834 – November 22, 1908) was a Republican politician in the U.S. State of Ohio who was a judge on the Ohio Supreme Court 1886–1902.

== Youth ==
Thaddeus A. Minshall was born near Hallsville, Ross County, Ohio. His mother died in 1841, and he worked in a woolen mill for six years starting in 1844. He also attended Mount Pleasant Academy at Kingston. He started teaching school at age twenty, studied law, and was admitted to the bar in 1861.

== Civil War ==
During the American Civil War, Minshall enlisted in the Union Army as a private in Company C of the 22nd Ohio Infantry April 20, 1861, and was mustered out after four months as a Sergeant Major. He re-enlisted October 1861 as a captain in Company H of the 33rd Ohio Infantry, served three years, and mustered out October, 1864.

== Legal ==
After the War, Minshall began a practice in Chillicothe, and was elected Prosecuting Attorney of Ross County. In 1877, he was elected Judge of the Court of Common Pleas to fill a vacancy, and elected to a full terms in 1878 and 1883.

In 1885, the Republicans nominated George W. McIlvaine to a fourth five-year term on the Ohio Supreme Court. He declined their offer, and Minshall was offered the nomination, and won election. He was re-elected more than once and served until February, 1902.

Thaddeus A Minshall died November 22, 1908, at Chillicothe. He had married Julia Ewing Pearson on April 9, 1873. He and his family are buried at Grandview Cemetery.

== Notes ==
Legal offices
Preceded by George W. McIlvaine	Associate Justice of the Ohio Supreme Court; 1886–1902	Succeeded by James Latimer Price
