= Humphrey H. Leavitt =

American judge (1796–1873)

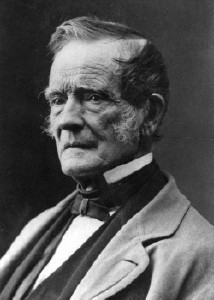

Judge of the United States District Court for the Southern District of Ohio
- In office February 10, 1855 – April 1, 1871
- Appointed by: operation of law
- Preceded by: Seat established by 10 Stat. 604
- Succeeded by: Philip Bergen Swing

Judge of the United States District Court for the District of Ohio
- In office June 30, 1834 – February 10, 1855
- Appointed by: Andrew Jackson
- Preceded by: Benjamin Tappan
- Succeeded by: Seat abolished

Member of the U.S. House of Representatives from Ohio
- In office December 6, 1830 – July 10, 1834
- Preceded by: John M. Goodenow
- Succeeded by: Daniel Kilgore
- Constituency: 11th district (1830–1833); 19th district (1833–1834)

Member of the Ohio Senate from the Jefferson County district
- In office December 3, 1827 – December 6, 1829
- Preceded by: William Lowery
- Succeeded by: Henry Swearingen

Member of the Ohio House of Representatives from the Jefferson County district
- In office December 5, 1825 – December 3, 1826 Serving with William Hamilton
- Preceded by: William Hamilton; William Lowery
- Succeeded by: James R. Wells; John McLaughlin

Personal details
- Born: Humphrey Howe Leavitt; June 18, 1796 Suffield, Connecticut, U.S.
- Died: March 15, 1873 (aged 76) Springfield, Ohio, U.S.
- Resting place: Spring Grove Cemetery; Cincinnati, Ohio
- Party: Jacksonian Democrat
- Children: John McDowell Leavitt
- Relatives: John Leavitt (father); John Brooks Leavitt (grandson)
- Education: Read law

Humphrey Howe Leavitt (June 18, 1796 – March 15, 1873) was a United States representative from Ohio and a United States district judge of the United States District Court for the District of Ohio and the United States District Court for the Southern District of Ohio.

== Education and career ==
Born on June 18, 1796, in Suffield, Connecticut, Leavitt moved with his family to the Northwest Territory in 1800, and settled in what would become Trumbull County, Ohio. He completed preparatory studies, attended an academy in western Pennsylvania, taught school and clerked in a store. He read law and was admitted to the bar in 1816. He served in the United States Army during the War of 1812. He entered private practice in Cadiz, Ohio from 1816 to 1820. He was a Justice of the peace in Harrison County, Ohio from 1818 to 1820. He was prosecutor of Monroe County, Ohio from 1818 to 1820. He resumed private practice in Steubenville, Ohio from 1820 to 1823. He was prosecutor for Jefferson County, Ohio from 1823 to 1829. He was a member of the Ohio House of Representatives from 1825 to 1826. He was a member of the Ohio Senate from 1827 to 1828. He was clerk of the Jefferson County Court of Common Pleas and Ohio Supreme Court from 1829 to 1832.

== Congressional service ==
Leavitt was elected as a Jacksonian Democrat from Ohio's 11th congressional district and Ohio's 19th congressional district to the United States House of Representatives of the 21st United States Congress to fill the vacancy caused by the resignation of United States Representative John M. Goodenow. He was reelected to the 22nd and 23rd United States Congresses and served from December 6, 1830, until July 10, 1834, when he resigned to accept a judicial position.

== Federal judicial service ==
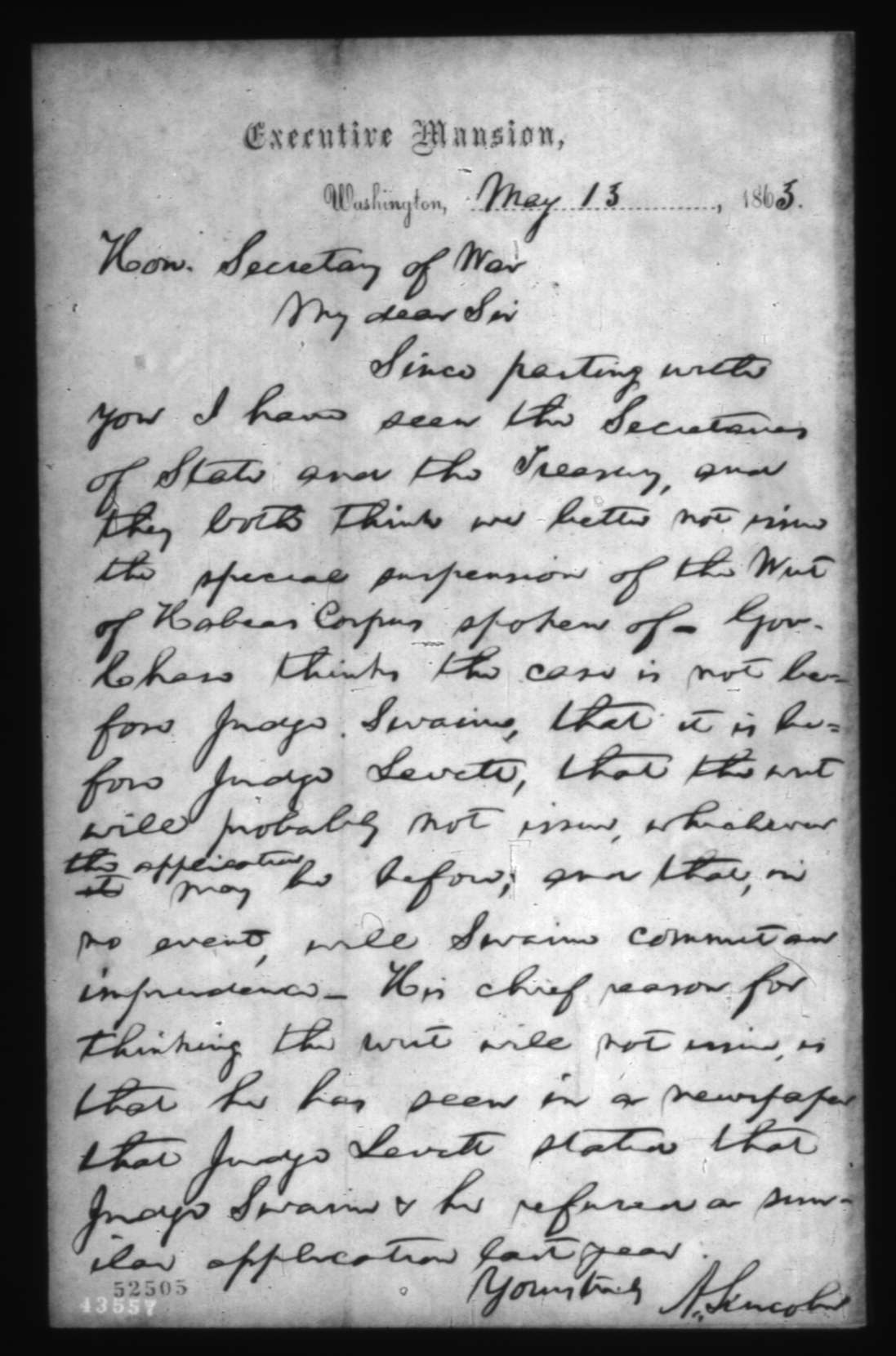
Letter from President Abraham Lincoln to United States Secretary of War Edwin M. Stanton discussing Judge Humphrey Leavitt's decision in habeas corpus case

Leavitt was nominated by President Andrew Jackson on June 28, 1834, to a seat on the United States District Court for the District of Ohio vacated by Judge Benjamin Tappan. He was confirmed by the United States Senate on June 28, 1834, and received his commission on June 30, 1834. Leavitt was reassigned by operation of law to the United States District Court for the Southern District of Ohio on February 10, 1855, to a new seat authorized by 10 Stat. 604. His service terminated on April 1, 1871, due to his retirement, by when he was the last remaining federal judge on the bench appointed by President Jackson.

=== Notable case ===
Among the major cases in which Leavitt was involved was that of Ohio politician Clement Vallandigham, in which Leavitt wrote an opinion on Vallandigham's well-known habeas corpus case, which Leavitt decided.

== Later activities and death ==
Leavitt moved to Cincinnati, Ohio, upon his reassignment to the Southern District of Ohio in 1855. He moved to Springfield, Ohio following his retirement in 1871. He engaged in literary pursuits after his retirement. He was a member of the World's Convention on Prison Reform in London, England in 1872. He died on March 15, 1873, in Springfield. He was interred in Spring Grove Cemetery in Cincinnati.

== Family ==
Born to an old New England family involved in the purchase of the Western Reserve from the state of Connecticut, Leavitt parents were Captain John Wheeler Leavitt and Silence (Fitch) Leavitt. The town of Leavittsburg in Trumbull County was named for the family. Leavitt was married to Marie Antoinette (McDowell) Leavitt, daughter of Dr. John McDowell, a physician and provost of the University of Pennsylvania. Humphey Howe and Marie Leavitt had three sons, including John McDowell Leavitt, all born at Steubenville. Through John, his grandson is attorney John Brooks Leavitt.

== Memoir ==
In a short memoir Leavitt wrote for his children, he described his feelings about a Congressman's job, which he described as "positively irksome and repulsive." Leavitt added: "In times of party division, it is impossible for anyone in Congress to preserve a conscience void of offense toward God and at the same time to bear true allegiance to the party by which he has been elected. The member must vote with his party irrespective of the public good or expect to be visited with the fiercest denunciation."

== See also ==
- John Leavitt (Ohio settler)
- John McDowell Leavitt
- John Brooks Leavitt
- List of United States federal judges by longevity of service

== Sources ==
- United States Congress. "Humphrey Howe Leavitt (id: L000183)". Biographical Directory of the United States Congress.

U.S. House of Representatives
Preceded by John M. Goodenow	Member of the U.S. House of Representatives from Ohio's 11th congressional district 1830–1833	Succeeded by James Martin Bell
Preceded by District established	Member of the U.S. House of Representatives from Ohio's 19th congressional district 1833–1834	Succeeded by Daniel Kilgore
Legal offices
Preceded by Benjamin Tappan	Judge of the United States District Court for the District of Ohio; 1834–1855	Succeeded by Seat abolished
Preceded by Seat established by 10 Stat. 604	Judge of the United States District Court for the Southern District of Ohio; 1855–1871	Succeeded by Philip Bergen Swing
