= John K. Miller =

American politician (1819–1863)

Member of the U.S. House of Representatives from Ohio's 11th district
- In office March 4, 1847 – March 3, 1851
- Preceded by: Jacob Brinkerhoff
- Succeeded by: George H. Busby

Personal details
- Born: May 25, 1819 Mount Vernon, Ohio, U.S.
- Died: August 11, 1863 (aged 44) Mount Vernon, Ohio, U.S.
- Resting place: Mound View Cemetery, Mount Vernon
- Party: Democratic
- Education: Jefferson College

John Krepps Miller (May 25, 1819 – August 11, 1863) was an American lawyer and politician who served as a two-term U.S. Representative from Ohio from 1847 to 1851.

== Early life ==
Born in Mount Vernon, Ohio, Miller attended the public schools. He graduated from Jefferson College, Canonsburg, Pennsylvania (now Washington & Jefferson College, in 1838. He studied law and was admitted to the bar in 1841. He then commenced practice in Mount Vernon, Ohio.

== Politics ==
He served as delegate to the Democratic National Convention in 1844.

== Congress ==
Miller was elected as a Democrat to the Thirtieth and Thirty-first Congresses (March 4, 1847 – March 3, 1851).

== Later life and death ==
On March 17, 1853, Miller was nominated by President Franklin Pierce as one of the first two associate justices of the Supreme Court of the Washington Territory, and he was confirmed by the senate four days later. However, it was soon learned that Miller had suffered a paralytic stroke, which would affect him for the remainder of his life. He resigned, and the president named fellow ex-Representative Moses Hoagland in his place on June 21, 1853.

In June 1856, Pierce named Miller as U.S. Consul at Bordeaux, though he declined this appointment. His brother, T. Ewing Miller, was appointed in his place the following month, and in August 1856, they sailed together for Le Havre.

He died at the age of 44 at his home in Mount Vernon, Ohio, on August 11, 1863. He was interred in Mound View Cemetery.

== Sources ==
U.S. House of Representatives
Preceded by Jacob Brinkerhoff	Member of the U.S. House of Representatives from Ohio's 11th congressional district 1847–1851	Succeeded by George H. Busby
