= Thomas Ritchey =

American politician

Member of the U.S. House of Representatives from Ohio
- In office March 4, 1847 – March 3, 1849
- Preceded by: Isaac Parrish
- Succeeded by: William A. Whittlesey
- Constituency: 13th district
- In office March 4, 1853 – March 3, 1855
- Preceded by: George H. Busby
- Succeeded by: Valentine B. Horton
- Constituency: 11th district

Personal details
- Born: January 19, 1801 Bedford County, Pennsylvania, US
- Died: March 9, 1863 (aged 62) Somerset, Ohio, US
- Resting place: Zion Methodist Episcopal Cemetery
- Party: Democratic

Thomas Ritchey (January 19, 1801 – March 9, 1863) was an American politician who served two non-consecutive terms as a U.S. representative from Ohio in the mid-19th century.

== Biography ==
Born in Bedford County, Pennsylvania, Ritchey moved to Somerset, Ohio. He attended the common schools. He engaged in agricultural pursuits. Treasurer of Perry County in 1835, 1837, and 1839.

=== Congress ===
Ritchey was elected as a Democrat to the Thirtieth Congress (March 4, 1847 – March 3, 1849).

Ritchey was elected to the Thirty-third Congress (March 4, 1853 – March 3, 1855).

=== Later career and death ===
He engaged in agricultural pursuits near Somerset, Ohio, until his death on March 9, 1863. He was interred in the Zion Methodist Episcopal Cemetery, Madison Township, Perry County, Ohio.

== Sources ==
- United States Congress. "Thomas Ritchey (id: R000271)". Biographical Directory of the United States Congress.

U.S. House of Representatives
Preceded by Isaac Parrish	Member of the U.S. House of Representatives from Ohio's 13th congressional district 1847–1849	Succeeded by William A. Whittlesey
Preceded by George H. Busby	Member of the U.S. House of Representatives from Ohio's 11th congressional district 1853–1855	Succeeded by Valentine B. Horton
