= George H. Busby =

American politician

George Henry Busby

Member of the U.S. House of Representatives from Ohio's 11th district
- In office March 4, 1851 – March 3, 1853
- Preceded by: John K. Miller
- Succeeded by: Thomas Ritchey

Member of the Ohio Senate
- In office 1853-1855

Personal details
- Born: June 10, 1794 Davistown, Pennsylvania, U.S.
- Died: August 22, 1869 (aged 75) Marion, Ohio, U.S.
- Resting place: Marion Cemetery
- Party: Democratic

Military service
- Allegiance: United States
- Branch/service: Ohio militia
- Battles/wars: War of 1812

George Henry Busby (June 10, 1794 – August 22, 1869) was a U.S. representative from Ohio for one term from 1851 to 1853.

== Biography ==
Born in Davistown, Pennsylvania, Busby attended the public schools. He moved to Ohio in 1810 with his father, who settled in Royalton, Fairfield County. He engaged in the general mercantile business. Major of militia in the War of 1812. He moved to Marion County in 1823 and helped organize the town of Marion, where he continued mercantile pursuits. He served as clerk of the Marion County courts and clerk of the supreme court 1824–1828. Recorder of deeds 1831–1835.

Busby was elected as a Democrat to the Thirty-second Congress (March 4, 1851 – March 3, 1853). He was not a candidate for renomination in 1852. He resumed mercantile pursuits. He served as member of the State senate 1853–1855. Probate judge of Marion County from 1866 until his death in Marion, Ohio, August 22, 1869. He was interred in Marion Cemetery.

== Sources ==
- United States Congress. "George H. Busby (id: B001162)". Biographical Directory of the United States Congress.

U.S. House of Representatives
Preceded by John K. Miller	Member of the U.S. House of Representatives from Ohio's 11th congressional district 1851–1853	Succeeded by Thomas Ritchey
