= Nathaniel Smith Richardson =

American minister and author (1810–1883)

Nathaniel Smith Richardson (January 8, 1810 – August 7, 1883) was an American Episcopal minister, author, and editor of The American Church Review.

Richardson, second son and fifth child of Nathaniel and Comfort (Stone) Richardson, was born in Middlebury, Conn., January 8, 1810.

He graduated from Yale College in 1834. After graduating, he spent two years in teaching: one as principal of the Academy in Millbury, Mass., and the other in the Episcopal School of North Carolina at Raleigh. He then spent two years in the General Theological Seminary in New York City, and on July 8, 1838, was ordained Deacon in the Protestant Episcopal Church, by Bishop Brownell, at (what is now) Portland, Conn. He immediately accepted the rectorship of Christ Church, Watertown, Conn, where he was advanced to the Priesthood by Bishop Brownell, September 29, 1839. In 1845 he resigned, to accept the rectorship of Christ Church, Derby, Conn., and while there became interested in a project for the establishment of a new periodical in the interests of the Episcopal Church. Accordingly, in 1848 he removed to New Haven, and devoted himself to the American Quarterly Church Review, of which he was sole editor and proprietor. In 1861 he removed the review to New York City, where he also took duty as assistant minister of St. Thomas' Church.

Twenty years of such exhaustive labor at last broke down his health, and early in 1867, having disposed of his magazine, he accepted the rectorship of St. Paul's Church, a missionary enterprise in Bridgeport, Conn. With characteristic energy he devoted himself to building up this parish, until it became one of the strongest in the city. About 1878 he established The Guardian, a weekly Church newspaper, published in New York, and finding the double labor too much resigned his rectorship at Easter, 1881. He continued to reside in Bridgeport, devoting his entire attention to editing and publishing The Guardian, until his sudden decease in that city, of paralysis, August 7, 1883, in his 74th year.

Richardson was the author of several books including Historical Sketch of Watertown, Connecticut (New Haven, 1845) and The Union, the Constitution and slavery (1864). He also wrote Reasons why I am a Churchman (Watertown, 1843); Churchman's Reasons for his Faith and Practice (1846); Reasons why I am not a Papist (1847); and Sponsor's Gift (1852; new ed., 1867).

On October 16, 1838, he married, in New Haven, Lydia A., only daughter of the Rev. Dr. James Murdock, who survived him. They had five sons and one daughter, none of whom survived him.

The degree of Doctor of Divinity was conferred on him by Racine College in 1857.
