= Isaac Parrish =

American politician from Ohio (1804–1860)

Member of the U.S. House of Representatives from Ohio
- In office March 4, 1839 – March 3, 1841
- Preceded by: James Alexander, Jr.
- Succeeded by: Benjamin S. Cowen
- Constituency: 11th district
- In office March 4, 1845 – March 3, 1847
- Preceded by: Perley B. Johnson
- Succeeded by: Thomas Ritchey
- Constituency: 13th district

Member of the Ohio House of Representatives
- In office 1837

Personal details
- Born: March 1804 St. Clairsville, Ohio, U.S.
- Died: August 9, 1860 (aged 56) Parrish City, Iowa, U.S.
- Resting place: Calhoun Cemetery, Calhoun, Iowa
- Party: Democratic

Isaac Parrish (March 1804 – August 9, 1860) was an American lawyer and politician who served two non-consecutive terms as a U.S. representative from Ohio in the mid-19th century.

== Early life and career ==
Born near St. Clairsville, Belmont County, Ohio, in March 1804, Parrish resided in Cambridge, Guernsey County, Ohio. He studied law. He was admitted to the bar and practiced. He served as prosecuting attorney of Guernsey County in 1833. He served as a member of the State house of representatives in 1837.

== Congress ==
Parrish was elected as a Democrat to the Twenty-sixth Congress (March 4, 1839 – March 3, 1841). He was an unsuccessful candidate for reelection in 1840 to the Twenty-seventh Congress.

Parrish was elected to the Twenty-ninth Congress (March 4, 1845 – March 3, 1847). He was not a candidate for renomination in 1846.

== Later career and death ==
He resumed the practice of law and his former business pursuits in Sharon. He was also interested in the real estate business and engaged in freighting by steamboat on the Mississippi River. He established the Harrison County Flag, published at Calhoun, Iowa.

He died in Parrish City, Iowa, August 9, 1860. He was interred in Calhoun Cemetery in Calhoun, Iowa.

== Sources ==
- United States Congress. "Isaac Parrish (id: P000082)". Biographical Directory of the United States Congress.

U.S. House of Representatives
Preceded by James Alexander, Jr.	Member of the U.S. House of Representatives from Ohio's 11th congressional district 1839–1841	Succeeded by Benjamin S. Cowen
Preceded by Perley B. Johnson	Member of the U.S. House of Representatives from Ohio's 13th congressional district 1845–1847	Succeeded by Thomas Ritchey
