= William Kennon Sr. =

American judge (1793–1881)

William Kennon
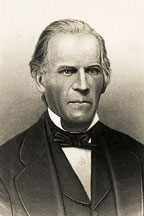

Member of the U.S. House of Representatives from Ohio
- In office March 4, 1829 – March 3, 1833
- Preceded by: John Davenport
- Succeeded by: Joseph Vance
- Constituency: 10th district
- In office March 4, 1835 – March 3, 1837
- Preceded by: James Martin Bell
- Succeeded by: James Alexander Jr.
- Constituency: 11th district

Ohio Supreme Court Judge
- In office December 1854 – March 1856
- Appointed by: William Medill
- Preceded by: William B. Caldwell
- Succeeded by: Jacob Brinkerhoff

Personal details
- Born: William Kennon, Sr. May 14, 1793 Uniontown, Pennsylvania, U.S.
- Died: November 2, 1881 (aged 88) St. Clairsville, Ohio, U.S.
- Resting place: Methodist Cemetery; St. Clairsville, Ohio, U.S.
- Party: Jacksonian
- Other political affiliations: Democratic, Republican
- Spouse: Mary Ellis (m. 1825)
- Children: 3
- Education: Franklin College

William Kennon Sr. (May 14, 1793 – November 2, 1881) was an American lawyer and politician who served three terms as a U.S. representative from Ohio. He served in Congress from 1829 to 1833, then again from 1835 to 1837.

He was a cousin of Congressman William Kennon Jr.

== Early life and career ==
Born in Uniontown, Pennsylvania, Kennon moved with his parents to Belmont County, Ohio, in 1804. He attended the common schools and Franklin College, New Athens, Ohio. He studied law. He was admitted to the bar in 1824 and commenced practice in St. Clairsville, Ohio.

== Congress ==
Kennon was elected as a Jacksonian to the Twenty-first and Twenty-second Congresses (March 4, 1829 – March 3, 1833). He was an unsuccessful candidate for reelection in 1832 to the Twenty-third Congress.

Kennon was elected to the Twenty-fourth Congress (March 4, 1835 – March 3, 1837). He was an unsuccessful candidate for reelection in 1836 to the Twenty-fifth Congress.

== Later career ==
He served as president judge of the court of common pleas 1840–1847. He served as delegate to the second State constitutional convention in 1850. He was appointed to fill the unexpired term of William B. Caldwell as judge of the Ohio Supreme Court in 1854 by Governor William Medill. He resigned in 1856 and resumed the practice of law in St. Clairsville, Ohio.

Kennon became affiliated with the Republican Party at the outbreak of the Civil War.

== Family life ==
Kennon married Mary Ellis on June 16, 1825, and they had three children.

== Death ==
Kennon died in St. Clairsville, Belmont County, Ohio, November 2, 1881. He was interred in Methodist Cemetery.

== Sources ==
- United States Congress. "William Kennon Sr. (id: K000123)". Biographical Directory of the United States Congress.

U.S. House of Representatives
Preceded by John Davenport	Member of the U.S. House of Representatives from Ohio's 10th congressional district March 4, 1829 – March 3, 1833	Succeeded by Joseph Vance
Preceded by James M. Bell	Member of the U.S. House of Representatives from Ohio's 11th congressional district March 4, 1835 – March 3, 1837	Succeeded by James Alexander Jr.
