= LaBrae High School =

Public high school in Leavittsburg, Ohio, United States

Coordinates: 41°15′11″N 80°52′21″W

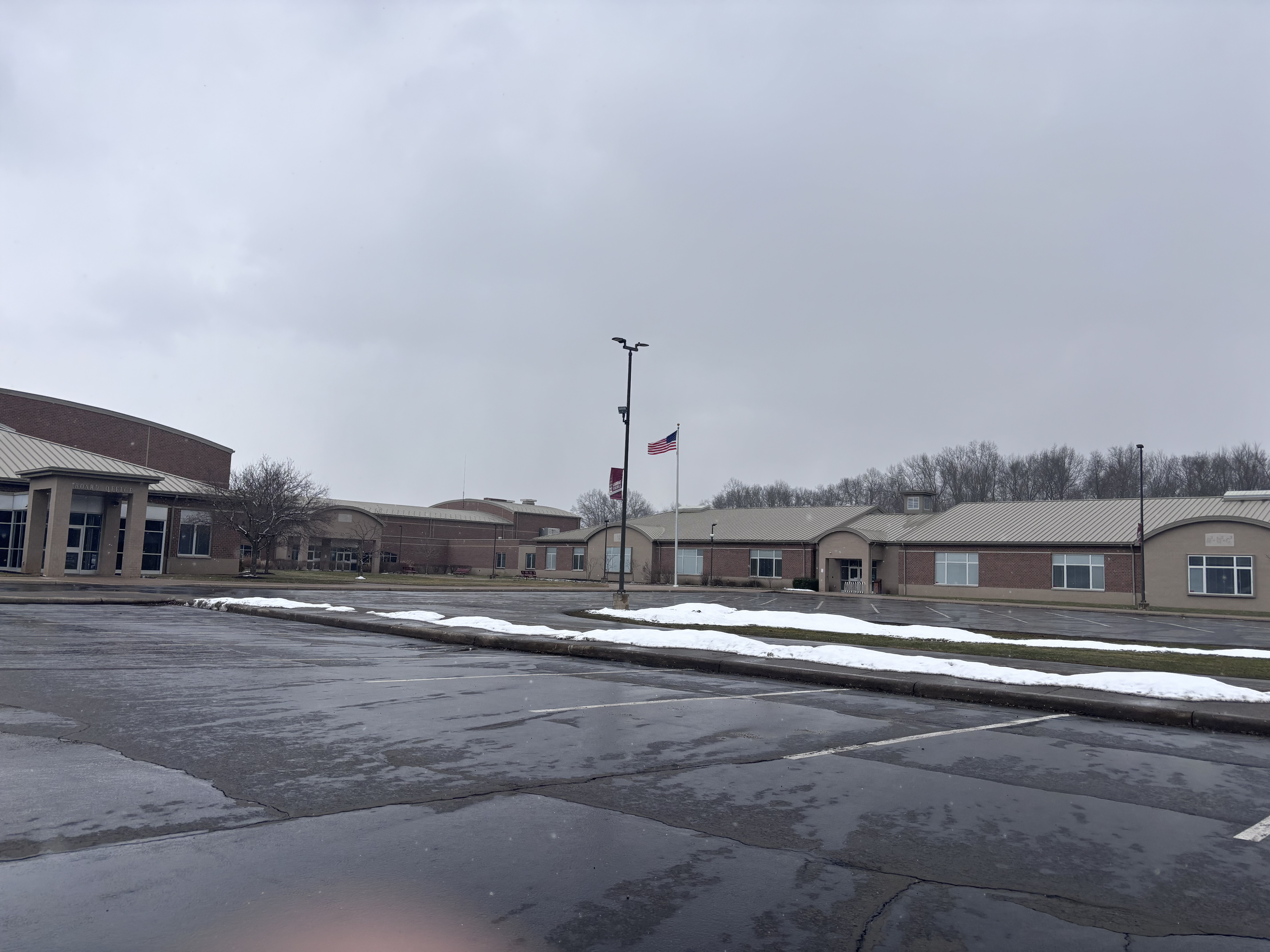
- LaBrae High School back entrance

Location
- 1001 N Leavitt Rd; Leavittsburg, Ohio, 44430; United States

Information
- School type: Public, Secondary
- Established: 1970
- School district: LaBrae Local School District
- Superintendent: Anthony J. Calderone
- NCES School ID: 390502303882
- Principal: Jeff Starkey
- Staff: 20.00 (FTE)
- Enrollment: 293 (2024–2025)
- Student to teacher ratio: 14.65
- Colors: Scarlet and grey
- Athletics conference: Mahoning Valley Athletic Conference
- Mascot: Viking
- Website: District Website

LaBrae High School is a public high school in Leavittsburg, Ohio. It is the only high school in the LaBrae Local School District. Athletic teams are known as the Vikings, and they compete as a member of the Ohio High School Athletic Association in the Mahoning Valley Athletic Conference

== History ==
LaBrae High School was established in 1970, from the consolidation of Leavittsburg High School and Braceville High School, the school's name was derived from a combination of the two communities, with "La" representing Leavittsburg and "Brae" representing Braceville.

LaBrae's original high school, built in 1916 and served originally as Leavittsburg High School, served as LaBrae's first high school until 2005, when a new campus was built to house both the junior and senior high schools. All the remaining LaBrae campuses were demolished in 2006, aside from Leavitt Elementary on Risher Rd.

== Athletics ==
LaBrae High School offers:

- Baseball
- Basketball
- Bowling
- Cross country
- Golf
- Football
- Soccer
- Softball
- Track and field
- Volleyball
- Wrestling

=== State championships ===
- Boys track and field – 1995
