= Leavittsburg, Ohio =

- Census-designated place
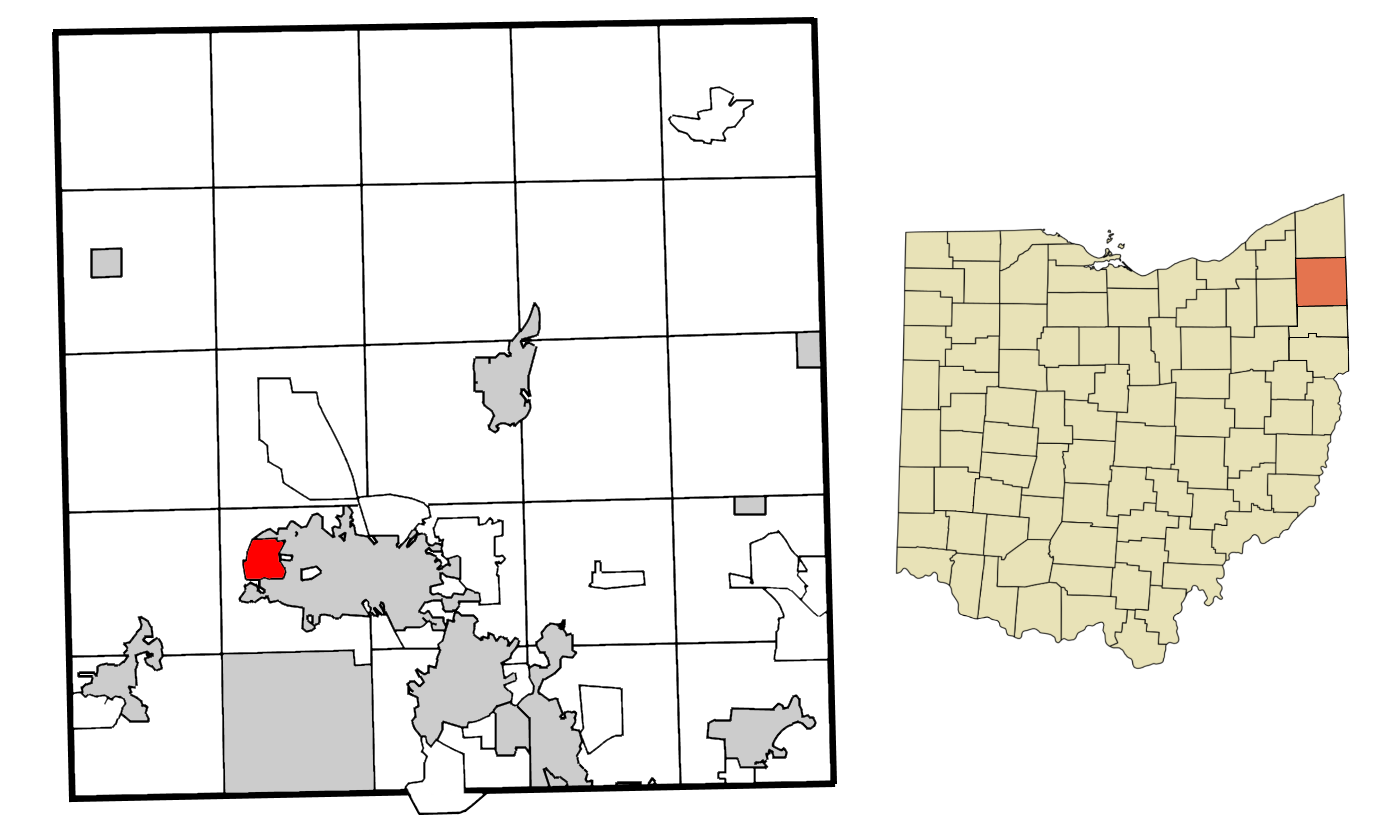
- Location of Leavittsburg in Trumbull County, Ohio.
- Coordinates: 41°14′52″N 80°52′37″W
- Country: United States
- State: Ohio
- County: Trumbull
- Township: Warren

Area
  - Total: 1.56 sq mi (4.03 km^{2})
  - Land: 1.48 sq mi (3.84 km^{2})
  - Water: 0.073 sq mi (0.19 km^{2})
- Elevation: 909 ft (277 m)

Population (2020)
  - Total: 1,571
  - Density: 1,058.9/sq mi (408.86/km^{2})
- Time zone: UTC-5 (Eastern (EST))
  - Summer (DST): UTC-4 (EDT)
- ZIP code: 44430
- Area codes: 234/330
- FIPS code: 39-42308
- GNIS feature ID: 2393095

Leavittsburg (/ˈlɛvɪtsbɜːrɡ/ LEV-its-burg) is a census-designated place in Trumbull County, Ohio, United States. The population was 1,571 at the 2020 census. Located directly west of Warren, Ohio, it is part of the Youngstown–Warren metropolitan area.

== History ==
Leavittsburg is named for the Leavitt family of Suffield, Connecticut, a prominent early mercantile New England family originally from Hingham, Massachusetts. Thaddeus Leavitt Esq. was one of the eight original purchasers of the Western Reserve lands from the state of Connecticut. (Leavitt and Suffield businessmen Oliver Phelps, Gideon Granger, Luther Loomis and Asahel Hatheway owned between them one-quarter of all the lands in the Western Reserve assigned to Connecticut.) Leavitt was married to Elizabeth King, the daughter of William King and Lucy (Hatheway), two prominent Suffield families. Leavitt had a fleet of ships that traded as far afield as the British West Indies and was a selectman for the town of Suffield. He was also the inventor of an early cotton gin.

Humphrey H. Leavitt, a U.S. congressman from Ohio born in Suffield, was a member of this family, as was John Leavitt, the owner of the first inn in Warren. Another member of the extended family was Henry Leavitt Ellsworth who traveled to Ohio in 1811 to investigate family lands in the region. (Ellsworth's father Oliver Ellsworth had purchased over 41,000 acres (170 km^{2}) in the Western Reserve, including most of present-day Cleveland.) The resulting volume was entitled A Tour to New Connecticut in 1811, and was published later after the manuscript was discovered in the Yale University library. A young Yale graduate of 19 when he made his first trip to New Connecticut (Ohio), Ellsworth went on to make several more trips to the west. Author Washington Irving accompanied Ellsworth on a subsequent trip over 20 years later, calling his journal A Tour on the Prairies.

A post office with the name Leavittsburgh was established March 15, 1864; the spelling was amended to Leavittsburg with effect from July 19, 1893. Leavittsburg was designated as the market town of Trumbull County, but Warren supplanted Leavittsburg, which remains mostly woodland.

== Geography ==
According to the United States Census Bureau, the CDP has a total area of 1.7 square miles (4.4 km^{2}), of which 1.7 square miles (4.4 km^{2}) is land and 0.1 square miles (0.26 km^{2}) (3.47%) is water.

== Demographics ==
Historical population
Census	Pop.	Note	%±
2000	2,200		—
2010	1,973		−10.3%
2020	1,571		−20.4%
U.S. Decennial Census

As of the census of 2000, there were 2,200 people, 811 households, and 606 families residing in the CDP. The population density was 1,319.2 inhabitants per square mile (509.3/km^{2}). There were 860 housing units at an average density of 515.7 per square mile (199.1/km^{2}). The racial makeup of the CDP was 99.00% White, 0.36% African American, 0.32% Native American, 0.09% from other races, and 0.23% from two or more races. Hispanic or Latino of any race were 0.91% of the population.

There were 811 households, out of which 32.2% had children under the age of 18 living with them, 58.0% were married couples living together, 12.2% had a female householder with no husband present, and 25.2% were non-families. 21.2% of all households were made up of individuals, and 9.5% had someone living alone who was 65 years of age or older. The average household size was 2.71 and the average family size was 3.14.

In the CDP the population was spread out, with 26.4% under the age of 18, 8.0% from 18 to 24, 28.3% from 25 to 44, 25.3% from 45 to 64, and 12.0% who were 65 years of age or older. The median age was 37 years. For every 100 females there were 96.3 males. For every 100 females age 18 and over, there were 97.8 males.

The median income for a household in the CDP was $37,031, and the median income for a family was $42,150. Males had a median income of $31,250 versus $21,472 for females. The per capita income for the CDP was $16,572. About 8.4% of families and 8.9% of the population were below the poverty line, including 8.2% of those under age 18 and 10.9% of those age 65 or over.

== Education ==
Children in Leavittsburg are served by the LaBrae Local School District. The name LaBrae is a combination of the names Leavittsburg and Braceville, two separate school districts which were merged in 1970 to form the new school district. The name was suggested by a local student. The current schools serving Leavittsburg are:

- Bascom Elementary School – grades K-2
- LaBrae Intermediate School – grades 3–5
- LaBrae Middle School – grades 6–8
- LaBrae High School – grades 9-12
