= John Leavitt (Ohio settler) =

Colonial American landowner and politician (1755–1815)

Captain John Leavitt
- Born: May 29, 1755; Suffield, Connecticut, British America
- Died: September 6, 1815 (aged 60); Warren, Ohio, U.S.
- Occupations: Landowner; inkeeper; politician
- Spouse: Silence Fitch (m. 1777)
- Children: 8

Capt. John Wheeler Leavitt (May 29, 1755 – September 6, 1815), born in Suffield, Connecticut, was an early settler of Ohio's Western Reserve lands, where members of his family had bought large tracts from the state of Connecticut, and where Leavitt became an early innkeeper, politician and landowner in Warren, Trumbull County, Ohio. Capt. Leavitt was a member of the Connecticut Land Company and along with his cousin Ebenezer King from Suffield, paid over $51,000 for approximately 78,500 acres (318 km^{2}) of Ohio land, which included the township of Warren. The Leavitt family of Warren would go on to play a substantial role in the history of their adopted town and in Ohio.

== Early life ==
John Wheeler Leavitt was the son of Abiah (Kent) Leavitt (Note: Abiah Kent was the daughter of Samuel Kent and Abiah Dwight, who was born in 1704 in Northampton, Massachusetts, where her father Justice Nathaniel Dwight, a trader and surveyor, was then living. Dwight was the progenitor of the Dwight family of Northampton, which produced a succession of major New England divines and Yale College presidents, including Timothy Dwight IV and Timothy Dwight V, named for Nathaniel Dwight's father Timothy, an early Puritan immigrant to Dedham, Massachusetts.) and John Leavitt of Suffield, a carpenter, farmer and landowner whose family was among the first settlers of Suffield. John Leavitt's brother Thaddeus, (Note: Thaddeus Leavitt's descendants included the American architect Richard Morris Hunt, the Boston painter William Morris Hunt, and the photography pioneer and attorney Leavitt Hunt.) a prominent Suffield merchant, was among the eight original purchasers of the Western Reserve from the state of Connecticut in 1796. Other extended family members were also involved in purchase of Western Reserve lands including Oliver Ellsworth, whose son Henry Leavitt Ellsworth later traveled to the Reserve to oversee family land grants, staying at the inn belonging to his cousin John Leavitt.

Capt. John Leavitt, a farmer and merchant, married Silence Fitch of Suffield in 1777. In 1800 John Leavitt and his wife set out for the Western Reserve, where the town of Leavittsburg was named for the family with the expectation that it would become the market town for Trumbull County. (John Leavitt was also one of the original proprietors of Aurora, Ohio, with members of the King, Phelps, and Granger families of Suffield. Leavitt was also an original proprietor of Mantua, Ohio.)

== Founding of Warren ==
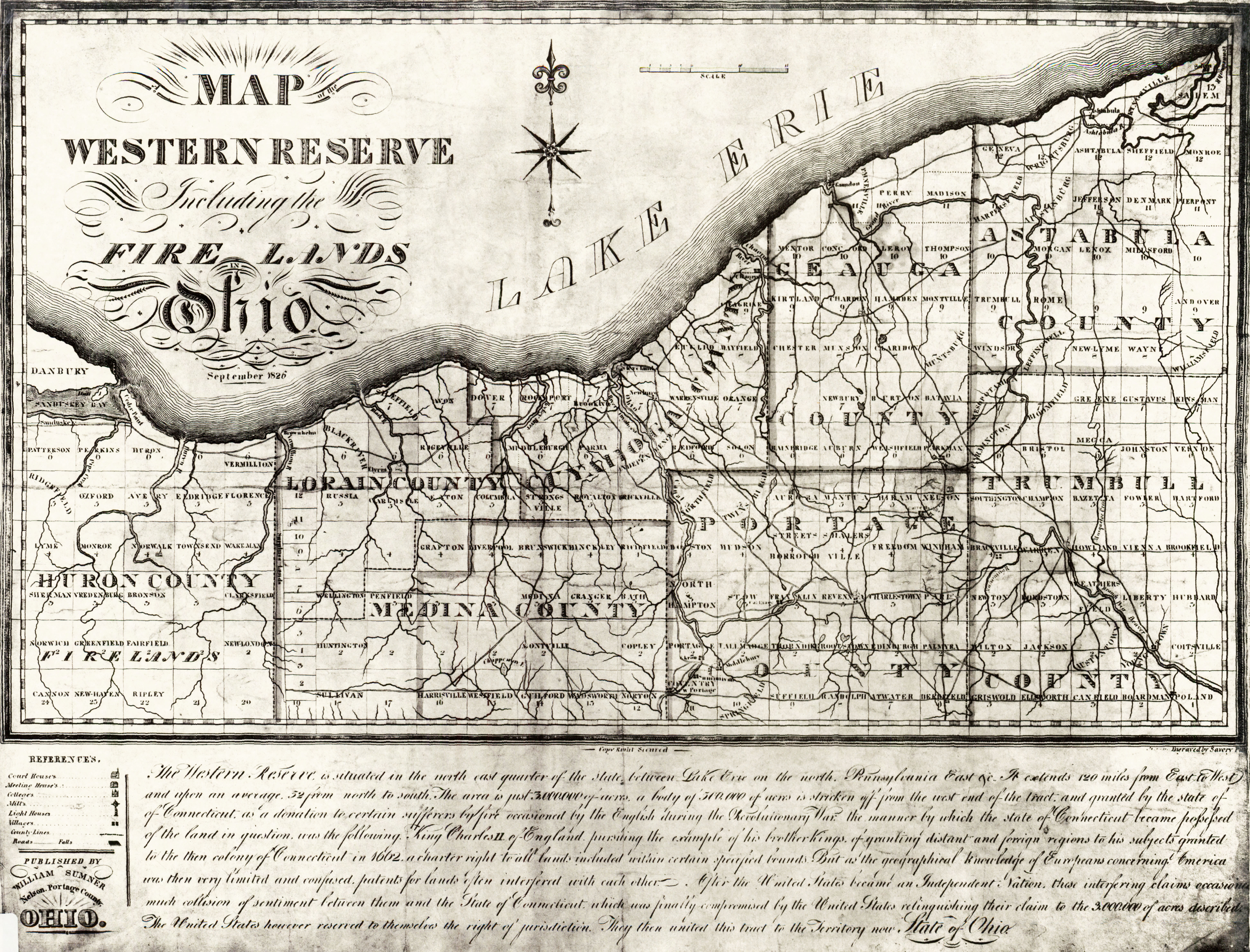
Map of the Western Reserve in 1826

On his arrival in the Western Reserve, Leavitt discovered that the prospective town of Warren was better situated than Leavittsburg, having more open bottom land and better mill sites. The original ownership of "township four, range four" – what became Warren – was vested in Ebenezer King Jr. and Capt. Leavitt. On his arrival in the summer of 1800, Capt. Leavitt built a cabin on the west side of what would later become Warren's Main Street. Leavitt subsequently returned to Connecticut, then came back to Warren the following year with wife Silence. The couple had eight children, many of whom later moved to Ohio: William, John Jr, Cynthia, Sally, Henry Fitch, Abdiah, Humphrey Howe and Albert.

The new town, according to some accounts, was infested at the time of Leavitt's arrival by enormous rattlesnakes. In one early account, written when Warren consisted of 16 settlers, an observer mentions a hunt which netted 486 rattlers. "At this time," wrote the observer, "rattlesnakes abounded in some places." The hunt he witnessed, in which cudgel-wielding settlers chased the snakes off their rock ledges and into their dens, was deemed a success, with the "slain collected into heaps... a good portion of which were larger than a man's leg below the calf, and over five feet in length."

But Warren's location – rattlesnakes aside – meant the town soon became the dominant town in the Mahoning Valley region. "Warren had influence that Youngstown did not possess", said the Mahoning Valley Historical Society, referring to Warren's early prominence in the region. Later settlers also chose to gather at the more propitiously-located Warren, instead of at Leavittsburg.

Shortly after his arrival, Capt. Leavitt converted his new home into an inn and tavern, opening the first hotel in Warren. He was followed to Warren by a steady stream of other family members, including his son John Jr., known as "Esquire John", who was county treasurer when he died at Warren in 1815; Capt. John's brother Samuel, known as "Esquire Samuel", born in Suffield in 1756, who upon visiting Warren in 1800, purchased a farm next door to that of his nephew John Jr. (Samuel Leavitt moved to Warren full-time in 1802, bringing his wife Abigail Kent Austin with him from Suffield. Following the death of his wife in 1816, Samuel Leavitt moved into a house on Main Street in Warren.)

== Other family members ==
Many members of the family became prominent, including Samuel Leavitt, who served as an Ohio state representative; John Leavitt Jr., who served as Trumbull County treasurer; Humphrey Howe Leavitt, the son of pioneer Capt. John Leavitt and an early United States Congressman and United States District Court judge; and Daniel Leavitt, the first public school teacher in Warren. John Leavitt, the original family settler, acted as captain of the local militia, from which he derived his title.

Like most pioneers, the Leavitt family had to provide the initial services in the region. John Leavitt Jr. founded the first public school. Capt. John Leavitt's first public house and tavern became the nucleus of Warren's growing community, serving as temporary headquarters for the region's first military officials. The first race track in the area was built on the Leavitt farm, sporting a large grandstand for spectators. (A later canal built through the farm destroyed the site, and the first race track decayed.)

Eventually, members of the extended Leavitt family (Note: All the Leavitt family immigrants to Ohio were descendants of Lt. Joshua Leavitt of Suffield, Connecticut, who married Hannah Devotion, daughter of John Devotion (born at Brookline, Massachusetts) of Suffield. Lt. Joshua Leavitt was the son of Josiah Leavitt, born in 1653 in Hingham, Massachusetts, the son of the immigrant English ancestor deacon John Leavitt and his second wife Sarah Gilman, daughter of Edward Gilman, Sr., of Exeter, New Hampshire.) in Suffield followed, including Enoch Leavitt (born in 1746, and known as 'Esquire Enoch'), who purchased the land on which most of the town of Warren now stands. Enoch died in 1815 and, like most of the Leavitt family, was buried in the family cemetery at Leavittsburg, largely a wooded area devoid of settlement. Enoch's son, Enoch Jr. became a well-known local physician who resided on his farm at Leavittsburg and by the time of his death in 1827 at age 52 had accumulated roughly 1,000 acres (4.0 km^{2}) of land in Trumbull County.

Leavittsburg, the town named for the early Ohio family, had a gristmill for many years, but largely escaped development. Today it is still rural, and the site of the Leavitt family cemetery, where many members of the family are buried. The first Leavitt settler in Ohio, Capt. John Leavitt, died at Warren in 1815.

== See also ==
- Leavitt (surname)
- Humphrey Howe Leavitt
- John McDowell Leavitt
- John Brooks Leavitt
- Thaddeus Leavitt
- Henry Leavitt Ellsworth
- Leavittsburg, Ohio
