= James Latimer Price =

American judge

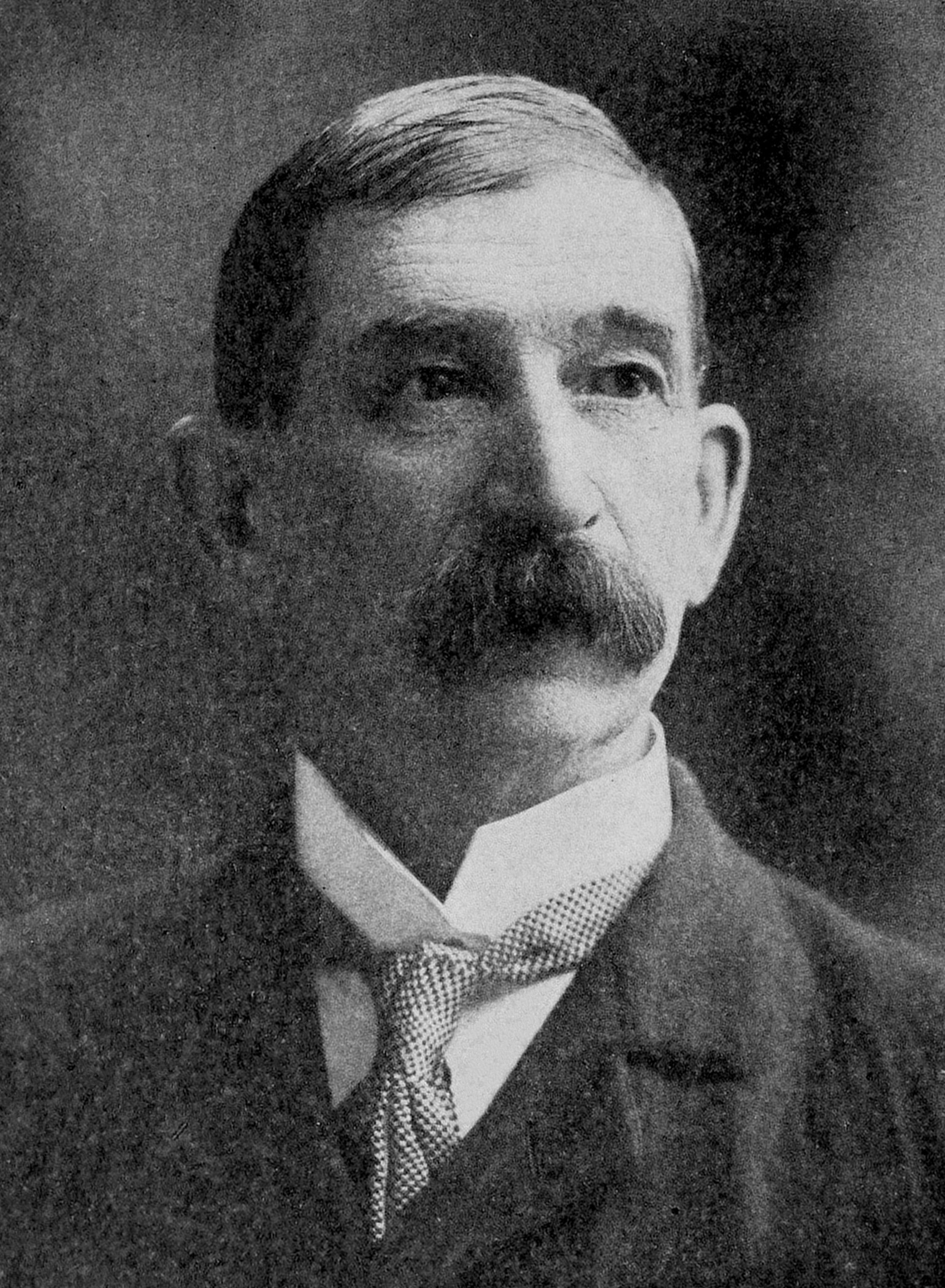

Ohio Supreme Court Associate Justice
- In office February 9, 1902 – March 11, 1912
- Preceded by: Thaddeus A. Minshall
- Succeeded by: Joseph W. O'Hara

Personal details
- Born: March 27, 1840 Carroll County, Ohio, U.S.
- Died: March 11, 1912 (aged 71) Martinsville, Indiana, U.S.
- Resting place: Lima, Ohio
- Party: Republican
- Spouse(s): Martha Guiney; Elizabeth Marshall
- Children: four

James Latimer Price (March 27, 1840 – March 11, 1912) was a Republican politician in the U.S. State of Ohio who was a judge on the Ohio Supreme Court from 1902 to 1912.

== Biography ==
James Latimer Price was born near the village of New Hagerstown, Orange Township, Carroll County, Ohio on March 27, 1840. He lived on a farm and attended public schools. He taught one term in Harrison County near Adena, and a term at New Hagerstown. He then studied law at the office of Eckley and Shober in Carrollton, Ohio.

Price was admitted to the bar at Cadiz, and opened an office in Carrollton, where he practiced until the spring of 1865. He was elected and served one term as Prosecuting Attorney of Carroll County, and then moved to Van Wert, where he formed a partnership with Judge I.D. Clark which lasted about two years. In 1868, he was elected Prosecuting Attorney of Van Wert County and served three terms. He acquired a large practice, and decided to remove to the thriving city of Lima in 1883.

In 1894, the Republicans nominated Price for Judge of the Third Judicial Circuit. He won in a heavily Democratic district, and served six years. In 1901, he was elected to the Ohio Supreme Court, and was seated February 9, 1902. He was re-elected in 1908. He served until March 11, 1912. He died on that date in Martinsville, Indiana at a sanitarium where he went to recover from illness. His funeral and burial were at Lima.

Price married Martha Guiney on January 1, 1862, and had two children. Martha and one child died in August 1866. He married Elizabeth Marshall on March 8, 1868. Her two children died in infancy.

== See also ==
List of justices of the Ohio Supreme Court#1893 to 1912

Legal offices
Preceded by Thaddeus A. Minshall	Associate Justice of the Ohio Supreme Court; 1902–1912	Succeeded by Joseph W. O'Hara
