= John Brooks Leavitt =

American lawyer

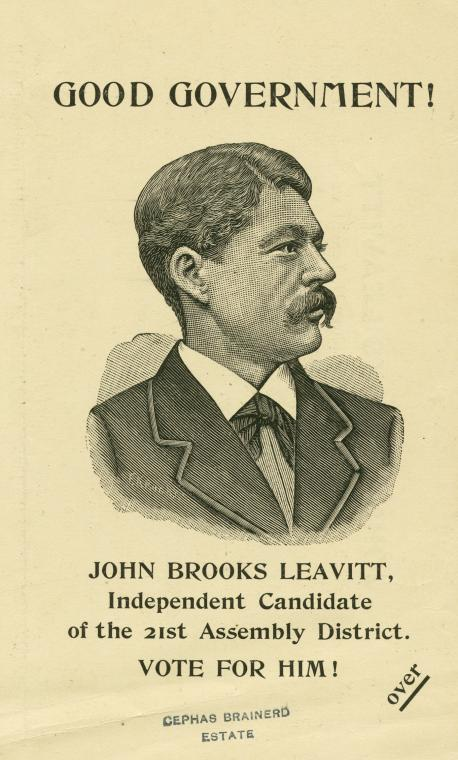
Campaign poster for John Brooks Leavitt, Independent Candidate for the 21st Assembly District, New York City

John Brooks Leavitt (1849–1930) was a New York City attorney, author and reformer. As member of the "Good Government" movement, Leavitt crusaded against Tammany Hall municipal corruption, demanding in 1897 the indictment of United States Senator Thomas C. Platt on charges of extorting bribes from the New York Life Insurance Company in return for favors to the insurance giant. "We have positive evidence, which as soon as New York has an honest District Attorney," Leavitt told a crowd of 2,000 gathered at Long Acre Square on Broadway, "will be laid before him, and we then shall be able to obtain an indictment and send the arch-boss to the jail which yawns for him." (Note: Despite many allegations of bribery against Senator Platt, including a $500 bounty offered for proof of Platt's bribe-taking by then-Mayor Col. William Lafayette Strong, the Senator was never indicted.)

== Early life and career beginnings ==
John Brooks Leavitt was born September 30, 1849, at Cincinnati, Ohio, where his father John McDowell Leavitt was practicing law, and his wife Bethia (Brooks) Leavitt. Leavitt subsequently attended high school in Zanesville, Ohio, where his father acted as minister of an Episcopal church after leaving his law practice. In 1868 Leavitt graduated from Kenyon College, and four years later he graduated with a master's degree. (Note: Kenyon College awarded John Brooks Leavitt a doctorate of laws in 1896.) Leavitt then enrolled at the Columbia University School of Law, where he graduated in 1871.

Following his graduation from Columbia, Leavitt began clerking in a New York City law office, and shortly after hung out his shingle as sole practitioner. (Note: Later Leavitt went into business with Boudinot Keith, opening the practice of Leavitt & Keith.) Leavitt's practice was meager, but gradually he found clients, usually cases he took when he felt a client had been shortchanged. An early client was a clergyman who was accused of grave immorality. In a subsequent case tied to election fraud, Leavitt filed suit against the New York State Secretary of State, the state's Attorney General and other state officers for contempt of court. The state officers sued by Leavitt were heavily fined by the court for their offense.

From the beginning of his career, Leavitt was outspoken. Among his targets through the years were the telephone monopoly, fellow attorneys who abused the contingency fee system, the laws regarding the criminally insane, and the need for ballot reform in New York State.

Early on, Leavitt laid out his philosophy in simple language. "The conservatism which preaches the improvement of the individual as the sole cure for social ills," Leavitt wrote in 1902, "will never improve the world." Leavitt then launched an attack on corruption in all forms – especially corporate. "If an illustration is needed it is to be found in the conduct of directors of corporations, who, when acting as a body, countenance theft, bribery, extortion, tyranny, lawlessness, trickery and fraud, which as individuals each man would abhor.... The old common-law saying that corporations have no souls is false. Corporations have souls. Governments have souls. Society has a soul."

In another of Leavitt's articles, he cut to the chase. In writing on the church (Leavitt's client was a high churchman accused of malfeasance), Leavitt addressed the temptation to follow conventional wisdom. In his essay The Attitude of the Church Towards Things Not Seen, the New York attorney noted that while church members believed miracles which happened two millennia ago, and which they had not seen, they were skeptical of current events they had seen. "Sheep follow the shepherd," Leavitt wrote. "Many laymen echo their minister."

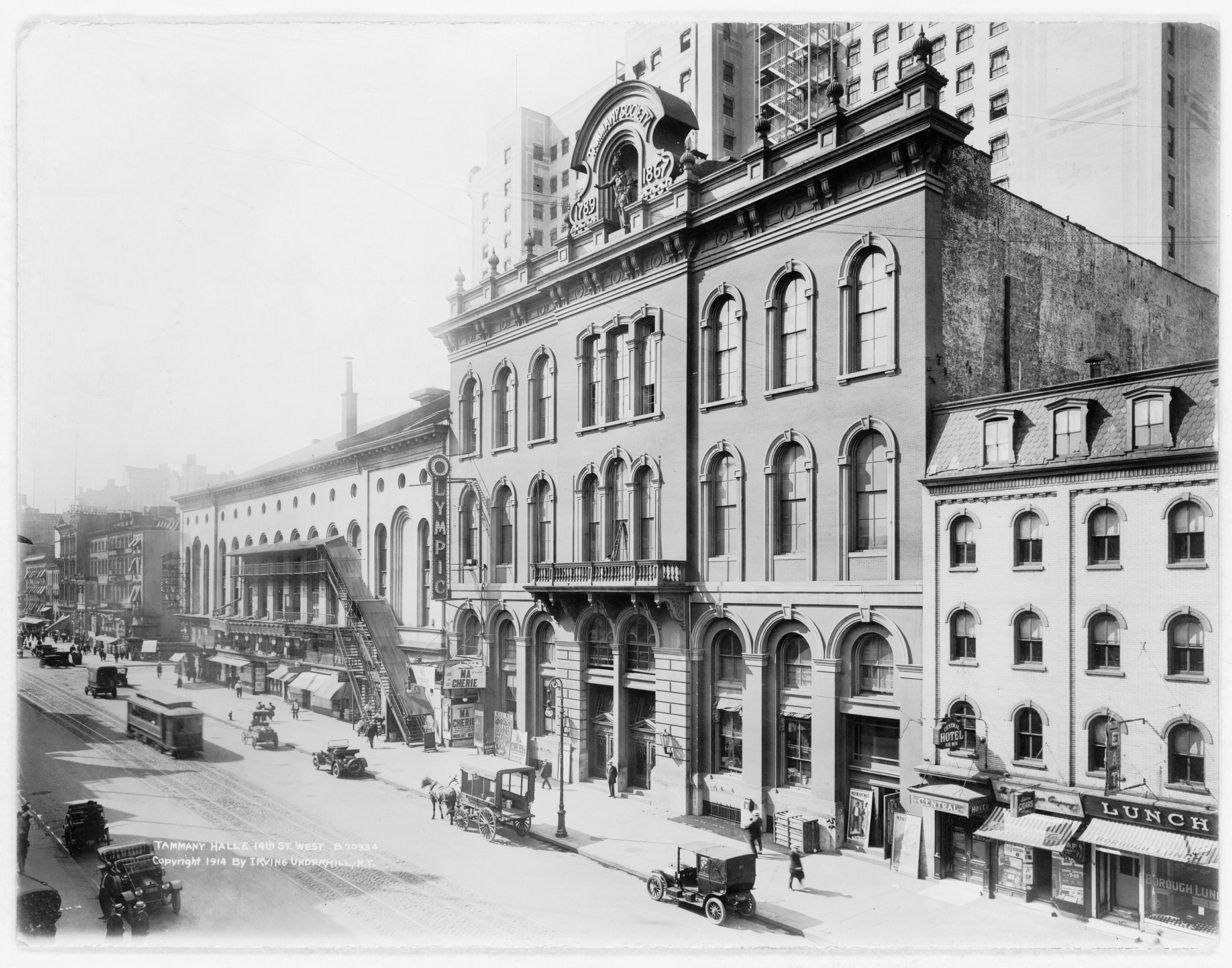
Tammany Hall, East 14th Street, New York City – headquarters of the Democratic party machine against which John Brooks Leavitt and other reformers railed

== Outspoken crusader ==
Leavitt rarely missed an opportunity to put across his message. Speaking to the graduating class of his alma mater Kenyon College in 1896, for instance, Leavitt titled his commencement speech "The Civic Duties of College Graduates." Two years later, Leavitt delivered an address he called "American Institutions and Political Machines". Nor did Leavitt always take up the most popular causes. In one of his polemics, entitled To What Extent Should Insane Persons Be Amenable to Criminal Law?, Leavitt examined the issue of mental illness and legal culpability. (At the time Leavitt served as the chairman of the committee on Criminal Procedure of New York State Bar Association. Afterwards, Leavitt chaired the Bar Association's Committee on Commitment and Discharge of the Criminal Insane. Leavitt became a pioneer of New York State laws relating to the criminal culpability of those adjudged mentally ill.

In 1910, Leavitt spoke to the graduating class of 18 women at the Woman's Law Class of New York University. "I regret to say that many of the criminal lawyers of this city," Leavitt told the newly minted attorneys, "do not reflect much credit on the profession, for far too often are they criminal in both senses of the word." If the jury system were removed, Leavitt told the 18 women who were among the first of their sex to practice law in the city, "in twenty-five years you will have a corrupt judiciary." (Note: "I trust that I shall ever be found as ready to raise my voice against judicial encroachments as against those of politicians or other less influential citizens," Leavitt wrote in a May 18, 1901, letter to The New York Times.)

Like many reformers, (Note: Although Leavitt counted himself among the forces of reform, among his good friends was Samuel Calvin Tate Dodd, longtime lawyer for John D. Rockefeller. On Dodd's death, Leavitt delivered a eulogy to Dodd before the New York Bar Association on January 14, 1908. Leavitt's eulogy was later reprinted as a volume entitled Memorial of Samuel C. T. Dodd.) Leavitt rarely passed up an opportunity to convey his message, and he was a frequent contributor of letters to the editor of The New York Times and other New York City newspapers. (Note: Leavitt's letters to the editor of The New York Times date from December 1922, March 1922, August 1923, and other dates.) The New York attorney was a contributor to the book Everyday Ethics, a collection of essays on professional ethics published by the Yale University Press in New Haven.

Among the progressives of the era, even during the era of President Theodore Roosevelt, there was widespread skepticism that things would change for the better. In a letter to John Brooks Leavitt of January 26, 1900, for instance, E. L. Godkin told the New York attorney that barring extraordinary events, he was happily removing himself from public service in the face of the greed and corruption of elected officials. "At the time in question I was under the delusion," Godkin wrote to the reformer Leavitt, "from which I have recovered, that deliverance might come for this City from our respectable classes.... Thank God I am out of it. Such a condition of things among the instructed classes needs at least a generation to be reformed."

Leavitt held no political offices, and expressed gratitude that he felt compelled towards none. (For many years, Leavitt was a member of the Citizens Union party, headquartered at 34 Union Square in lower Manhattan. Nor did he serve on any corporate boards of directors. In 1893 he was persuaded to run for Assemblyman on the 'Good Government' reform ticket, but failed to win election, which the crusading lawyer said came as a relief. Leavitt served on committees for reform of the Bar Association, where he proposed novel plans including reconstituting the United States Circuit Court of Appeals with a different composition of federal judges.

== Later life and legacy ==
John Brooks Leavitt was a member of the University Club, the Social Reform Club, the New York City League of Reform, the National Civil Service Reform League, the Barnard Club, Onteora Club, the Bar Association of New York City, the New York State Bar Association, the American Bar Association and the reform-minded Civil Service League. Leavitt was a long-serving member of the New York Bar Association's Committee on Unlawful Practice of the Law, as well as the Committee on the Prevention of Unnecessary Litigation. He regularly contributed articles to The Counsellor, the New York Law School Law Journal, where he was listed as contributor.

Leavitt kept a law office at 30 Broad Street in downtown Manhattan. He was considered a Mugwump Republican. Until the end of his life Leavitt served in various volunteer capacities with the Protestant Episcopal Church for the diocese of New York, and was the longtime Senior Warden at St. Mark's Church in-the-Bowery in Manhattan's East Village.

Leavitt was a founding director in 1891 of the East Side House, a settlement house on the East Side of Manhattan endowed by Charles B. Webster of R. H. Macy & Co. The House was designed to form a "self-supporting club which should keep the workingmen off the streets and out of the saloons."

Leavitt was active in the Alumni Associations of Columbia College and Kenyon College, which conferred an honorary Doctor of Laws degree on him in 1896. He continued to write widely for periodicals and magazines, and often spoke to gatherings on the subject of municipal and corporate corruption. Leavitt was married in 1879 at Bethlehem, Pennsylvania, to Mary Keith, daughter of Rev. Ormes B. Keith of Philadelphia, and great-niece of Elias Boudinot, president of the United States Congress at the close of the Revolutionary War. Mary (Keith) Leavitt died at the couple's home at 1 Lexington Avenue at Gramercy Park in Lower Manhattan on July 3, 1916, at age 59.

== See also ==
- John Leavitt (Ohio settler)
- Humphrey Howe Leavitt
- John McDowell Leavitt
