= John Davenport (Ohio politician) =

American politician

Member of the U.S. House of Representatives from Ohio's 10th district
- In office March 4, 1827 – March 3, 1829
- Preceded by: Thomas Shannon
- Succeeded by: William Kennon, Sr.

Member of the Ohio House of Representatives
- In office 1824; 1827; 1830

Member of the Ohio Senate
- In office 1825-1826

Personal details
- Born: January 9, 1788 Winchester, Virginia, U.S.
- Died: July 18, 1855 (aged 67) Woodsfield, Ohio, U.S.
- Resting place: Green Mount Cemetery, Barnesville, Ohio
- Party: Adams

John Davenport (January 9, 1788 – July 18, 1855) was a U.S. representative from Ohio.

Born near Winchester, Virginia, Davenport attended the common schools. He moved to Ohio in 1818 and engaged in mercantile pursuits. Davenport settled in Belmont County, Ohio. There he served as member of the State house of representatives in 1824, 1827, and 1830. He served as member of the State senate in 1825 and 1826.

Davenport was elected as an Adams candidate to the Twentieth Congress (March 4, 1827 – March 3, 1829). He was an unsuccessful candidate for reelection in 1828 to the Twenty-first Congress. Davenport was twice elected by the legislature as judge of the Monroe judicial circuit.

John Davenport died in Woodsfield, Ohio, July 18, 1855, with interment at Green Mount Cemetery in Barnesville, Ohio.

== Family ==
John Davenport's wife was Martha Coulson of Virginia, the daughter of American Revolutionary War veteran Captain Coulson, while his father was also served in that war. Davenport's grandson from his daughter Frances Ellen Davenport, William D. Hare, served as a state legislator in Oregon.

== Sources ==
- United States Congress. "John Davenport (id: D000076)". Biographical Directory of the United States Congress.

U.S. House of Representatives
Preceded by Thomas Shannon	United States Representative from Ohio's 10th congressional district March 4, 1827–March 3, 1829	Succeeded by William Kennon, Sr.
Ohio House of Representatives
Preceded by William Perrine; Isaac Atkinson; John Scatterday	Representative from Belmont County; December 6, 1824-December 4, 1825; Served alongside: Thomas Shannon	Succeeded by William Perrine; William Dunn
Preceded by James Weir; Crawford Welsh; Andrew Patterson	Representative from Belmont County; December 6, 1830-December 4, 1831; Served alongside: James Alexander, Jr. Andrew Crockett	Succeeded by John Patton; William Workman; William B. Hubbard
Ohio Senate
Preceded by David Jennings	Senator from Belmont County; December 5, 1825-March 3, 1827	Succeeded by William B. Hubbard
