= James Martin Bell =

American lawyer and politician

James M. Bell

Member of the U.S. House of Representatives from Ohio's 11th district
- In office March 4, 1833 – March 3, 1835
- Preceded by: Humphrey H. Leavitt
- Succeeded by: William Kennon, Sr.

Member of the Ohio House of Representatives
- In office 1826-1831

Personal details
- Born: James Martin Bell; October 16, 1796 Huntingdon County, Pennsylvania, U.S.
- Died: April 4, 1849 (aged 52) Cambridge, Ohio, U.S.
- Resting place: Founders' Burial Ground
- Party: Anti-Jacksonian

James Martin Bell (October 16, 1796 – April 4, 1849) was an American lawyer and politician who served one term as a U.S. representative from Ohio from 1833 to 1835.

== Biography ==
Born in Huntingdon County, Pennsylvania, Bell attended the public schools. He studied law in Steubenville, Ohio. He was admitted to the bar in 1817 and commenced practice in Cambridge, Ohio.

He served as major general of the Fifteenth Division, Ohio Militia.

=== Early career ===
He served as prosecuting attorney of Guernsey County from 1818 to 1832. He served as member of the State house of representatives from 1826 to 1831, serving as speaker in 1830 and 1831. He served as master commissioner in 1827. He was in the Justice of the Peace in 1830. County school examiner in 1830.

=== Congress ===
Bell was elected as an Anti-Jacksonian to the Twenty-third Congress, serving from March 4, 1833 to March 3, 1835. He was an unsuccessful candidate for reelection in 1834 to the Twenty-fourth Congress.

=== Career after Congress ===
After leaving Congress, he resumed the practice of law. He also served as mayor of Cambridge from 1838 to 1840.

=== Death ===
He died in Cambridge, Ohio, on April 4, 1849, and was interred in Founders' Burial Ground.

== Sources ==
- United States Congress. "James Martin Bell (id: B000338)". Biographical Directory of the United States Congress.

U.S. House of Representatives
Preceded by Humphrey H. Leavitt	United States Representative from Ohio's 11th congressional district March 4, 1833–March 3, 1835	Succeeded by William Kennon, Sr.
Ohio House of Representatives
Preceded by William Thompson	Representative from Guernsey County; December 4, 1826-December 4, 1831	Succeeded by David Tullis
Preceded by Thomas L. Hamer	Speaker of the House; December 6, 1830-December 4, 1831	Succeeded by William B. Hubbard
