= National Register of Historic Places listings in Coshocton County, Ohio =

Location of Coshocton County in Ohio

This is a list of the National Register of Historic Places listings in Coshocton County, Ohio.

This is intended to be a complete list of the properties and districts on the National Register of Historic Places in Coshocton County, Ohio, United States. The locations of National Register properties and districts for which the latitude and longitude coordinates are included below, may be seen in an online map.

There are 20 properties and districts listed on the National Register in the county. Another property was once listed but has been removed.

This National Park Service list is complete through NPS recent listings posted March 14, 2025.

== Current listings ==
	Name on the Register	Image	Date listed	Location	City or town	Description
1	Adams-Gray House	Adams-Gray House	December 5, 1979 (#79001797)	Southeast of Trinway on Tobacco Hill Rd. 40°09′31″N 81°56′54″W	Virginia Township	Extends into Cass Township in Muskingum County
2	Chalfant Church	Chalfant Church	March 15, 1982 (#82004416)	South of Warsaw off State Route 60; 40°10′58″N 82°01′06″W	Washington Township	
3	Coshocton County Courthouse	Coshocton County Courthouse	May 22, 1973 (#73001402)	Courthouse Sq. 40°16′27″N 81°51′59″W	Coshocton	
4	Coshocton Main Street Historic District	Coshocton Main Street Historic District	February 28, 2019 (#100003497)	Roughly bounded by Main, Chestnut, and Walnut Sts. between 3rd and 7th Sts. 40°16′25″N 81°51′50″W	Coshocton	
5	Eldridge-Higgins Building	Eldridge-Higgins Building	August 6, 1998 (#98001012)	525 Orange St. 40°16′14″N 81°51′48″W	Coshocton	
6	Andrew Ferguson House	Andrew Ferguson House	November 30, 1978 (#78002028)	East of West Lafayette on State Route 751; 40°16′19″N 81°43′38″W	Lafayette Township	
7	Helmick Covered Bridge	Helmick Covered Bridge	June 18, 1975 (#75001348)	East of Blissfield on Township Road 25; 40°23′35″N 81°56′34″W	Clark Township	
8	Thomas Johnson House	Thomas Johnson House	May 14, 1982 (#82004415)	State Route 541; 40°12′33″N 81°43′01″W	Plainfield	
9	Johnson-Humrickhouse House	Johnson-Humrickhouse House	October 9, 1974 (#74001424)	302 S. 3rd St. 40°16′14″N 81°52′00″W	Coshocton	
10	Lamberson-Markley Houses	Lamberson-Markley Houses	October 18, 1984 (#84000125)	713 Main St. in Canal Lewisville; 40°17′55″N 81°50′24″W	Tuscarawas Township	
11	Samuel Lee House	Samuel Lee House	December 6, 1979 (#79001796)	306 4th St. 40°16′36″N 81°51′54″W	Coshocton	
12	J.F. Meek Buildings	J.F. Meek Buildings	January 2, 1985 (#85000033)	546 Chestnut St. and 213-215 N. 6th St. 40°16′30″N 81°51′43″W	Coshocton	
13	Daniel Miller House	Daniel Miller House	January 3, 1980 (#80002967)	West of West Lafayette at 52357 County Road 16; 40°16′40″N 81°46′41″W	Lafayette Township	
14	Cuthbert Milligan House	Cuthbert Milligan House	November 25, 1980 (#80002966)	North of Coshocton; 40°19′58″N 81°53′36″W	Keene Township	
15	Muskingum River Navigation Historic District	Muskingum River Navigation Historic District	February 9, 2007 (#07000025)	Coshocton, Muskingum, Morgan, Washington Counties; 40°17′02″N 81°52′39″W	Numerous jurisdictions	
16	Eli Nichols Farm	Eli Nichols Farm	November 29, 1982 (#82001364)	Off the junction of Rabbit Ridge and Brush Run Rds., west of Walhonding; 40°21′16″N 82°10′59″W	Newcastle Township	
17	Old Union School	Old Union School	October 18, 1984 (#84000127)	310 Sycamore St. 40°16′41″N 81°51′59″W	Coshocton	
18	Roscoe Village	Roscoe Village	April 3, 1973 (#73001403)	Whitewoman and High Sts. 40°16′35″N 81°52′36″W	Coshocton	
19	Walhonding Canal Lock No. 9	Walhonding Canal Lock No. 9	February 24, 1986 (#86000307)	State Route 715, west of Warsaw; 40°20′42″N 82°04′33″W	Jefferson Township	
20	Warsaw Hotel	Warsaw Hotel	March 17, 1994 (#94000244)	102 E. Main St. 40°20′08″N 82°00′23″W	Warsaw	

== Former listing ==
	Name on the Register	Image	Date listed	Date removed	Location	City or town	Description
1	Rodrick Bridge	Rodrick Bridge	November 29, 1978 (#78002027)	April 10, 1998	8.5 miles (13.6 km) southeast of Coshocton; 40°10′00″N 81°46′20″W	Coshocton	Moved to the OSU-Newark campus in 1997. Relisted in Licking County in 1998.

== See also ==
- List of National Historic Landmarks in Ohio
- Listings in neighboring counties: Guernsey, Holmes, Knox, Licking, Muskingum, Tuscarawas
- National Register of Historic Places listings in Ohio
