= Ohio State Route 79 =

State highway in central Ohio, US

State Route 79

Route information
- Maintained by ODOT
- Length: 45.65 mi (73.47 km)
- Existed: 1924–present

Major junctions
- South end: SR 37 near Buckeye Lake
- I-70 in Buckeye Lake; US 40 in Hebron; SR 16 in Newark
- North end: US 36 in Nellie

Location
- Country: United States
- State: Ohio
- Counties: Fairfield, Licking, Coshocton

Highway system
- Ohio State Highway System; Interstate; US; State; Scenic
← SR 78	→ I-80

State Route 79 (SR 79) is a north–south highway that traverses Central Ohio, extending from Buckeye Lake at SR 37 to Nellie at US 36. SR 79 serves Newark, providing direct-access from Downtown Newark to I-70.

== History ==
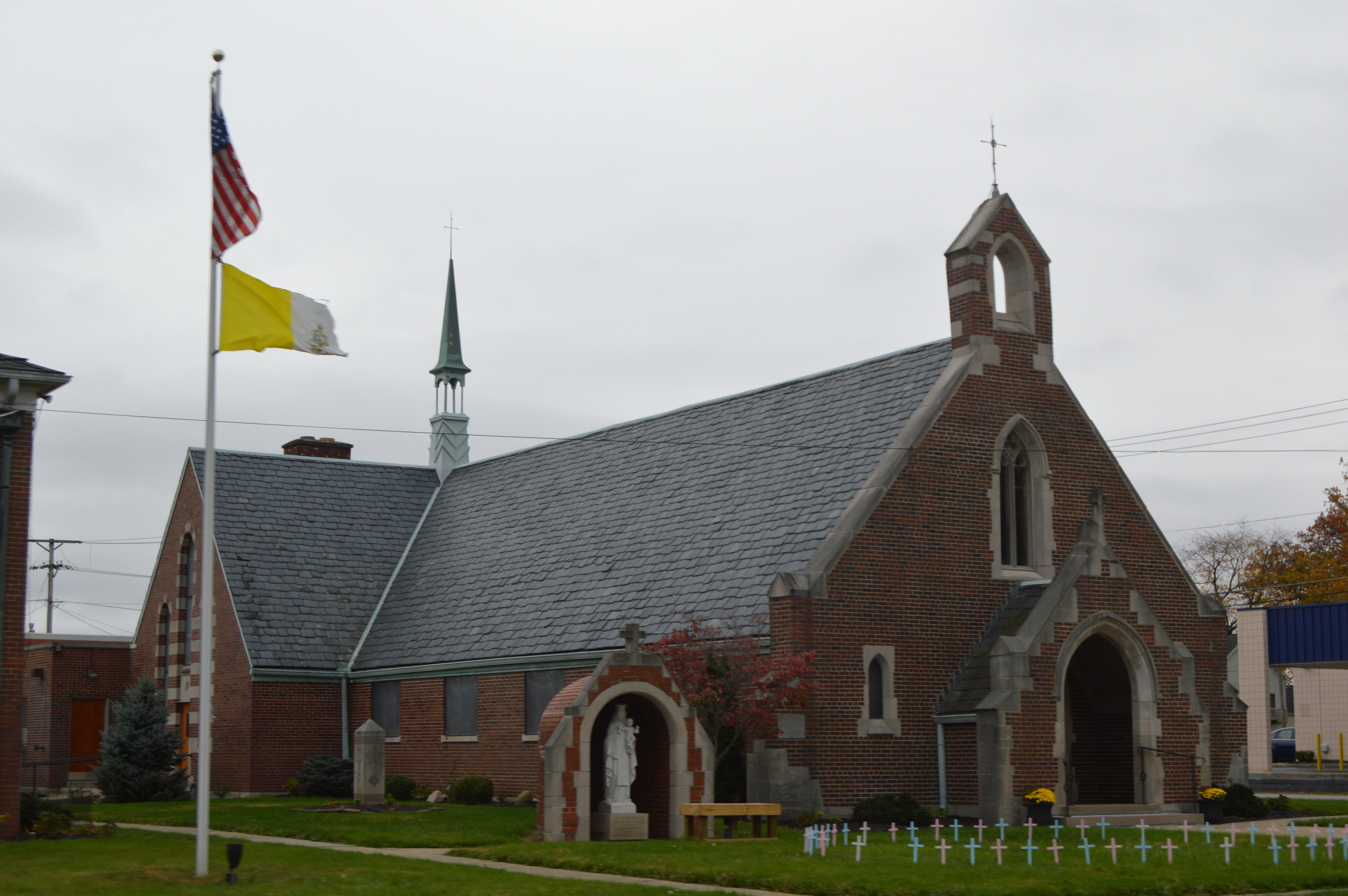
Church on SR 79 in Buckeye Lake

SR 79 was first designated between Lancaster and Walhonding in 1924 by way of Hebron, Newark, and Newcastle. By 1926, the northern terminus had been rerouted to Nellie. In 1932, the segment between Lancaster and Hebron was deleted (the part not concurrent with US 40 became SR 37) but within one year, the route was extended about 1 1/2 miles (2.4 km) south to Buckeye Lake ending at SR 157. In 1959, SR 79 took over most of the routing of SR 157 to end at SR 37, its current southern terminus. This extension occurred around the same time of the completion of I-70 in the area. Except for reroutings onto expressways in Hebron and Newark, the route has not experienced any other major changes.

Until 2005, State Route 79 Alternate (SR 79A) was a 1.72-mile-long (2.77 km) alternate route of SR 79. SR 79A split from SR 79 south of Hebron. SR 79 bypasses Hebron to the east, while SR 79A, or Business Route 79, ran through downtown Hebron as High Street. SR 79A followed High Street as it intersected Enterprise Drive, which ended as SR 79A, at SR 79 north of Hebron.

== Major junctions ==
County	Location	mi	km	Destinations	Notes
Fairfield–Licking county line	Walnut–Union township line	0.00	0.00	SR 37 – Lancaster	
Fairfield–Licking county line	Walnut–Union township line	1.35	2.17	SR 360 east / Canal Road	Western terminus of SR 360
Licking	Buckeye Lake	2.76	4.44	SR 360 west (North Bank Road)	Eastern terminus of SR 360
Licking	Union Township	4.14– 4.53	6.66– 7.29	I-70 – Wheeling, WV, Columbus	Exit 129 (I-70)
Licking	Hebron	5.34– 5.77	8.59– 9.29	US 40 (Main Street / National Road) – Hebron, Zanesville	Interchange
Licking	Newark			South end of freeway	
Licking	Newark	12.50	20.12	Union Street	Northbound exit to Union Street / southbound entrance from Williams Street only
Licking	Newark	12.87	20.71	Grant Street	Southbound exit / northbound entrance only
Licking	Newark	13.31	21.42	Main Street	
Licking	Newark	13.81	22.23	SR 16 west – Columbus	Southern end of SR 16 concurrency
Licking	Newark	13.93	22.42	11th Street	Southbound exit / northbound entrance only
Licking	Newark	14.27– 14.63	22.97– 23.54	SR 13 (South 4th Street / North Hudson Avenue) – Columbus	
Licking	Newark	15.07	24.25	North Buena Vista Street	Former northbound exit and southbound entrance; closed in 2012
Licking	Newark	15.56	25.04	SR 16 east / North Cedar Street – Coshocton	Northern end of SR 16 concurrency
Licking	Newark			North end of freeway	
Licking	Fallsbury Township	30.13	48.49	SR 586 to SR 16 – Martinsburg	
Coshocton	Perry Township	39.36	63.34	SR 541	
Coshocton	Nellie	45.65	73.47	US 36 – Mount Vernon, Warsaw	
1.000 mi = 1.609 km; 1.000 km = 0.621 mi: Concurrency terminus; Incomplete access
