= Linton Mills, Ohio =

Coordinates: 40°10′26″N 81°41′36″W

Linton Mills is a former town in Coshocton County, in the U.S. state of Ohio. The GNIS classifies it as a populated place.

== History ==
Linton Mills had its start when a sawmill was established at the site in 1847. A post office opened at Linton Mills in 1853, and the first postmaster was George Washington Phillips. It remained in operation until 1901.
