= Delaneysville, Ohio =

Coordinates: 40°11′2″N 81°53′31″W

Delaneysville is a ghost town in Coshocton County, in the U.S. state of Ohio.

== History ==
Delaneysville was laid out around 1840 by one Mr. Delaney, and named for him.
