= Adams–Gray House =

Historic place in Ohio, United States

- U.S. National Register of Historic Places
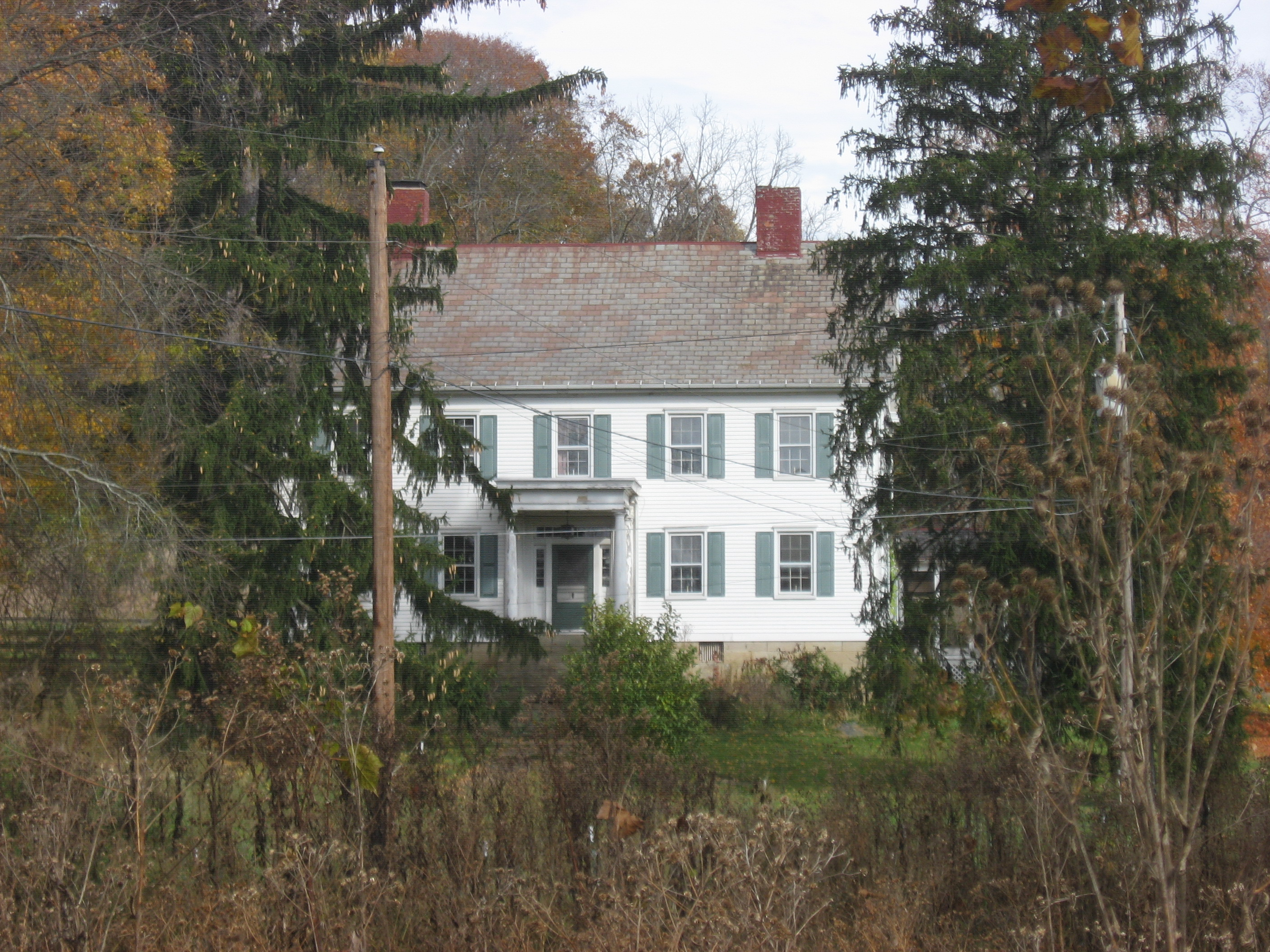
- Front of the house

- Location within Ohio Location within the United States
- Nearest city: Trinway, Ohio
- Coordinates: 40°9′32″N 81°56′55″W
- Area: 3.5 acres (1.4 ha)
- Built: 1840
- Architectural style: Classical Revival
- NRHP reference No.: 79001797
- Added to NRHP: December 5, 1979

The Adams–Gray House was a historic farmhouse in the community of Adams Mills, Ohio. Constructed in the 1840s in two separate counties, it was named a historic site, and was destroyed on February 20, 2019 after a fire started in the home.

== History ==
Unusually, the Adams–Gray House sits on both sides of the line dividing Coshocton County to the north and Muskingum County to the south. At one time, the house's site was entirely within Muskingum County's Jefferson Township, but after Coshocton County was formed, its portion of the site became part of Virginia Township, while a financial dispute caused most of Jefferson Township to be split off as Cass Township in the 1850s. The northern township derived its name from that of the home state of most of its pioneer settlers, among whom was the builder of the Adams–Gray House, Edward G. Adams. Although construction began in 1840, a date reflected in an inscription above the house's entrance, the house was not completed until 1841.

=== Destruction by fire ===
On February 19, 2019, a fire broke out in the kitchen of the house, though it was unoccupied. Local fire crews were able to control the fire and limit the damage, but the following morning, while Adams Mills was hit with heavy snow and ice, the fire started again and completely engulfed and destroyed the house.

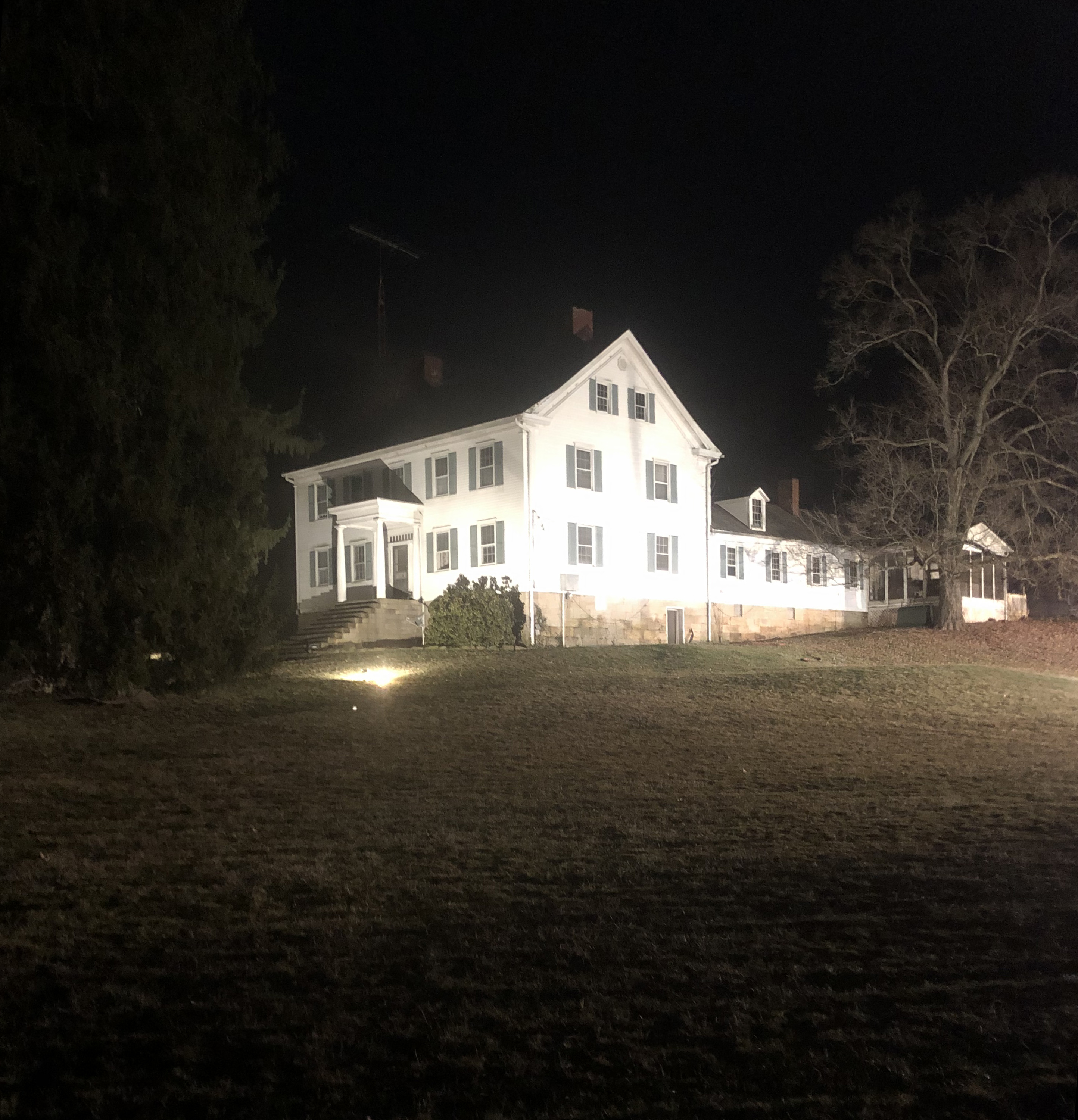
Adams–Gray House after first fire was controlled, 19 Feb. 2019

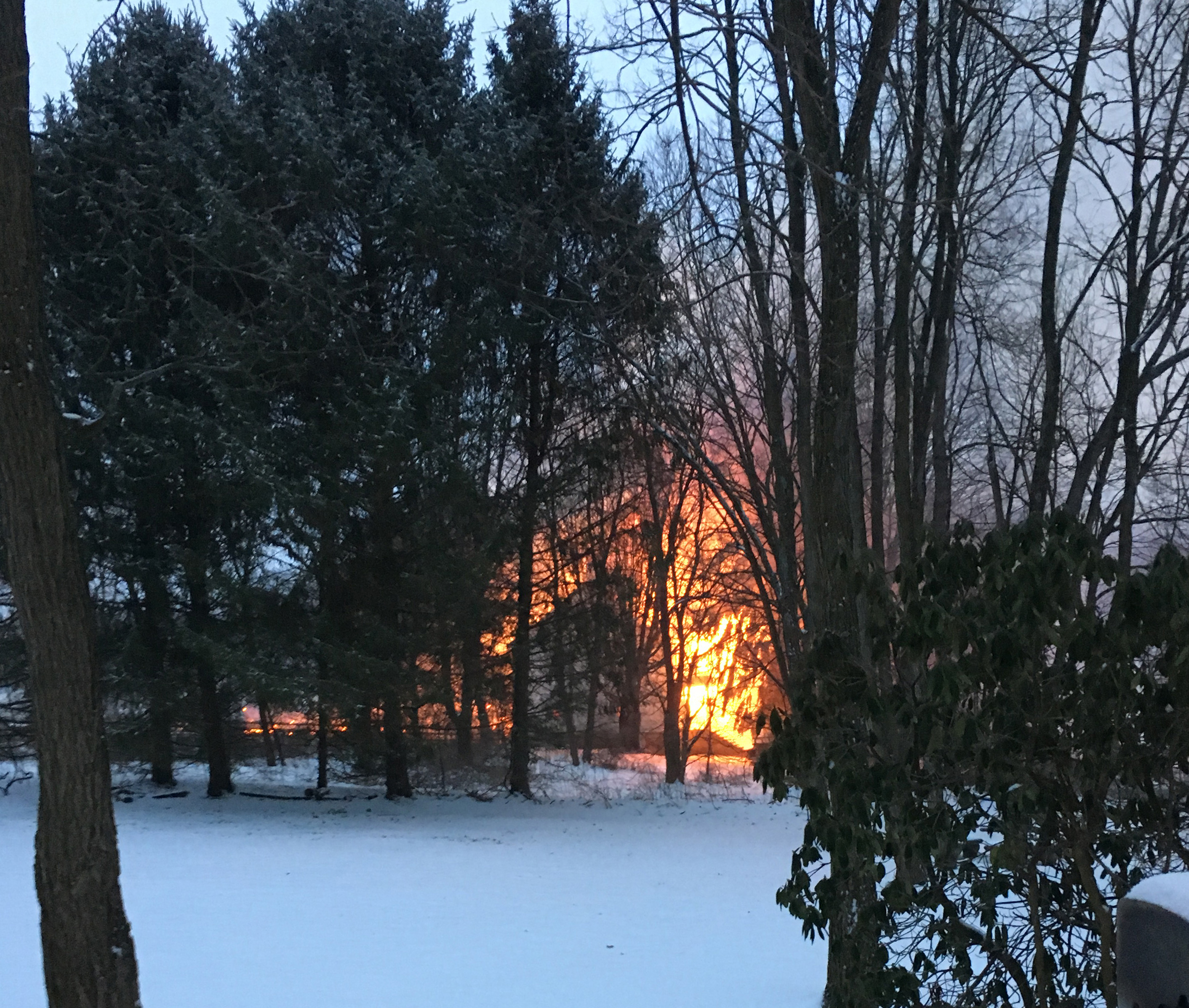
The house fully engulfed in flame, 20 Feb. 2019

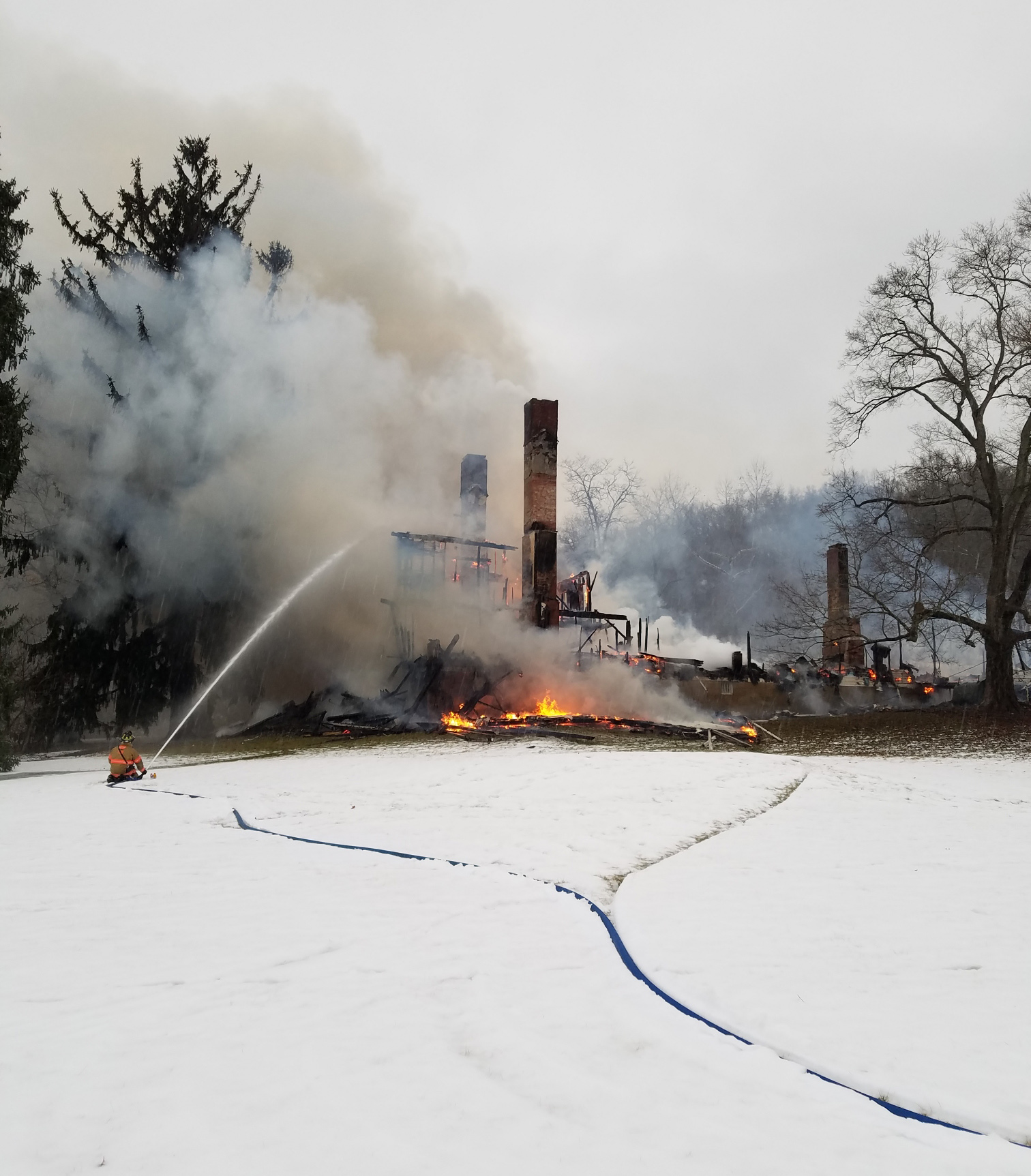
Smoldering remains, with firefighting still ongoing

== Architecture ==
Built of wood on a foundation of sandstone, the house is covered by aluminium siding and topped with a slate roof. Two and a half stories tall, the house is pierced by five openings on each story of the facade, with the portico-sheltered entrance replacing a window in the center of the first story, while the side features two windows in each story. To the rear, a smaller addition features dormer windows above its sole full story. The primary section of the house is covered by a gabled roof, with the gable featuring small windows and being defined by a broken pediment. As the house is set on land that rises slightly toward the rear, the entrance is placed several feet above the surrounding ground, so a set of steps provides access to the main entrance. A pair of square chimneys sits atop the peak of the roof.

The floor plan consists of rooms placed around a large hallway at the center of the house, reflecting the traditional architecture of Edward Adams' native Virginia, where such a hallway provided plenty of ventilation during the hot months of summer, as well as furnishing space for the elaborately decorated staircase. Adams included ornate cast iron in the fireplaces of two of the rooms, with reliefs of Ceres holding baskets of fruit and flowers being placed on both sides of each opening, while above each opening he placed a relief depicting a scene from Byron's Mazeppa in which wolves chase a wild horse to which the naked Ivan Mazepa is bound. These sculptures' origin is uncertain; they may well have been transported from an Eastern foundry with which he would have been familiar, or even imported from Europe, but Ohio metalworkers were already producing similar workmanship by this time.

== Historic site ==
In 1979, the Adams–Gray House was listed on the National Register of Historic Places, qualifying because of its historically significant architecture and because of its connection to Edward Adams. It is one of few National Register-listed sites located in multiple Ohio counties; except for a survey marker, the Seven Ranges Terminus, it is the only one that is not a historic district, a bridge, or some other linear site important for its role in transportation. One other such site, the Muskingum River Navigation Historic District, includes the entirety of the Muskingum River, which flows nearby.
