= Bedford Township, Ohio =

Bedford Township, Ohio may refer to:

- Bedford Township, Coshocton County, Ohio
- Bedford Township, Meigs County, Ohio
- Bedford Township, Cuyahoga County, Ohio now defunct.
