= New Moscow, Ohio =

Unincorporated community in Ohio, United States

Coordinates: 40°12′38″N 81°58′18″W

New Moscow is an unincorporated community in Virginia Township of Coshocton County, Ohio, United States.

== History ==
New Moscow had a start when a store was established there. The community was laid out in 1835. A post office called New Moscow opened in 1851, and remained in operation until 1905.
