= Ohio State Route 361 =

State highway in Pickaway County, Ohio, US

State Route 361

Route information
- Maintained by ODOT
- Length: 4.67 mi (7.52 km)

Major junctions
- West end: US 23 in Pickaway Township
- East end: SR 159 in Pickaway Township

Location
- Country: United States
- State: Ohio
- Counties: Pickaway

Highway system
- Ohio State Highway System; Interstate; US; State; Scenic
← SR 360	→ SR 362

State Route 361 (SR 361, OH 361) is a 4.67-mile-long (7.52 km) long state highway entirely located within Pickaway Township, Pickaway County, Ohio. The route connects US 23 with SR 159 just north of Kingston.

== Route description ==
The state highway begins at an unsignalized intersection with the divided US 23 in Pickaway Township. The two-lane road travels east through farmland though there are two S-curves that bring the route further south. In the unincorporated community of Elmwood, the road passes over a railroad via a bridge. After the railroad bridge, SR 361 curves to the southeast and passes through more farmland before ending at a skewed T-intersection with SR 159 about 0.2 miles (0.32 km) north of the Pickaway-Ross County line and the village of Kingston.

== History ==
A segment of modern-day SR 361 running about 1.6 miles (2.6 km) from US 23 to the Logan Elm State Memorial was first designated in 1932 as an unnumbered gravel road. By 1934, the route received its number of SR 361. The route was extended to its current length between US 23 and SR 159 circa 1937. By 1948, the route was fully paved and has not changed since its first designation.

== Major intersections ==
The entire route is in Pickaway Township, Pickaway County.

mi	km	Destinations	Notes
0.00	0.00	US 23 – Chillicothe, Circleville	
4.67	7.52	SR 159	
1.000 mi = 1.609 km; 1.000 km = 0.621 mi
