= Old Union School (Coshocton, Ohio) =

- U.S. National Register of Historic Places
- Location within Ohio Location within the United States
- Location: 310 Sycamore St., Coshocton, Ohio
- Coordinates: 40°16′39″N 81°52′1″W
- Area: 1 acre (0.40 ha)
- Built: 1855
- Architect: A.N. Milner
- Architectural style: Greek Revival
- NRHP reference No.: 84000127
- Added to NRHP: October 18, 1984

The Old Union School at 310 Sycamore St. in Coshocton in Coshocton County, Ohio was built in 1855. It was a work of A.N. Milner and is designed in the Greek Revival style of architecture. It was listed on the National Register of Historic Places in 1984.

It is one of few antebellum schoolhouses surviving in the county and served all grades. It was a brick building with plain stone lintels and a gable roof. Bricks were made from clay on the site. Greek Revival details include its entrance, its cornice returns, brick pilasters across the facade, and flat stone lintels. Carpentry was by George Hay, and stone work was by Henry Davis.

It became offices for the Coshocton City School Board in 1979.

According to a website documenting old Ohio schools in Coshocton County it is gone, demolished.

The NRHP nomination document, with photos conclusively showing that the old school is different than the building now on the site (File:Old Union School in Coshocton.jpg), is available in 2022 from NARA.
