= Ohio State Route 360 =

State highway in Ohio, US

State Route 360
- North Bank Road

Route information
- Maintained by ODOT
- Length: 1.94 mi (3.12 km)
- Existed: 1938–present

Major junctions
- West end: SR 79 in Walnut Township
- East end: SR 79 in Buckeye Lake

Location
- Country: United States
- State: Ohio
- Counties: Fairfield, Licking

Highway system
- Ohio State Highway System; Interstate; US; State; Scenic
← SR 359	→ SR 361

State Route 360 (SR 360) is a short east–west route in Buckeye Lake, Ohio. SR 360 starts and ends at SR 79, paralleled to the shore of Buckeye Lake. The route was designated in 1938, and has not changed significantly since.

== Route description ==
SR 360 is mostly in Fairfield County, with a small part in Licking County. It is aligned to a part of the northern shore of Buckeye Lake. SR 360 is also known as North Bank Road, an undivided highway. Some parts of the centerline are covered by pothole repairs. Around 730 cars travel the road on average each day at the beginning of the route, and 1,270 near the end of the route.

The road starts at an at-grade intersection of SR 79 and Canal Road. Then, it moves southeast and parallels Buckeye Lake. After a bit more than a mile later, SR 360 heads north and ends at SR 79. The majority of the route is inside residential areas. Despite being near Buckeye Lake, the lake is not visible from the road. The route's path is that of an irregularly shaped "U", with westernmost and easternmost of the route following north–south roads.

== History ==
SR 360 was created in 1938, and no routing changes were made since. SR 360's road surface changed from gravel to asphalt between 1961 and 1962, and was repaved in 1986 and 1999.

== Major intersections ==
County	Location	mi	km	Destinations	Notes
Fairfield	Walnut Township	0.00	0.00	SR 79	
Licking	Buckeye Lake	1.94	3.12	SR 79	
1.000 mi = 1.609 km; 1.000 km = 0.621 mi
