= Bethlehem Township, Coshocton County, Ohio =

Township in Ohio, US

- Township
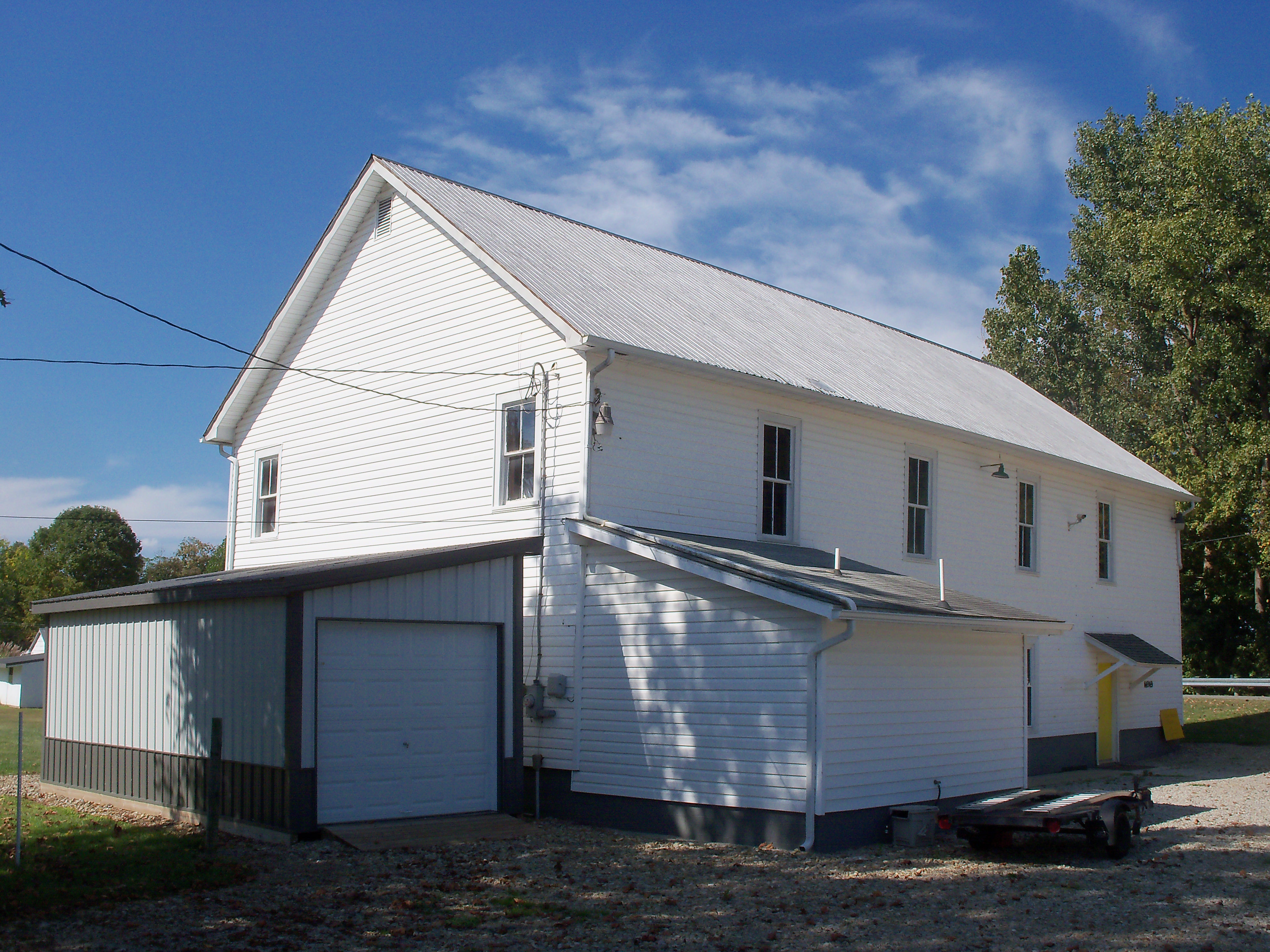
- Bethlehem Grange Hall near U.S. Route 36

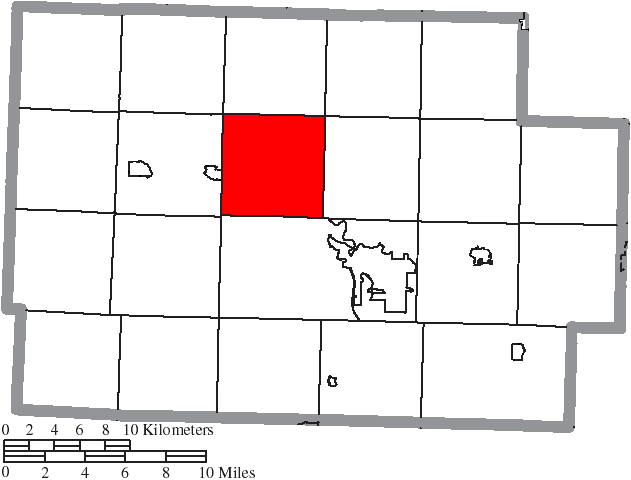
- Location of Bethlehem Township in Coshocton County
- Coordinates: 40°19′54″N 81°56′47″W
- Country: United States
- State: Ohio
- County: Coshocton

Area
  - Total: 25.1 sq mi (65.1 km^{2})
  - Land: 25.1 sq mi (65.0 km^{2})
  - Water: 0.039 sq mi (0.1 km^{2})
- Elevation: 902 ft (275 m)

Population (2020)
  - Total: 1,054
  - Density: 42.0/sq mi (16.2/km^{2})
- Time zone: UTC-5 (Eastern (EST))
  - Summer (DST): UTC-4 (EDT)
- FIPS code: 39-06152
- GNIS feature ID: 1085911

Bethlehem Township is one of the twenty-two townships of Coshocton County, Ohio, United States. As of the 2020 census the population was 1,054.

== Geography ==
Located in the north central part of the county, it borders the following townships:

- Clark Township - north
- Mill Creek Township - northeast corner
- Keene Township - east
- Jackson Township - south
- Bedford Township - southwest corner
- Jefferson Township - west
- Monroe Township - northwest corner

No municipalities are located in Bethlehem Township.

== Name and history ==
Bethlehem Township was organized in 1826.

Statewide, the only other Bethlehem Township is located in Stark County.

== Government ==
The township is governed by a three-member board of trustees, who are elected in November of odd-numbered years to a four-year term beginning on the following January 1. Two are elected in the year after the presidential election and one is elected in the year before it. There is also an elected township fiscal officer, who serves a four-year term beginning on April 1 of the year after the election, which is held in November of the year before the presidential election. Vacancies in the fiscal officership or on the board of trustees are filled by the remaining trustees.
