= Jackson Township, Coshocton County, Ohio =

Township in Ohio, US

- Township
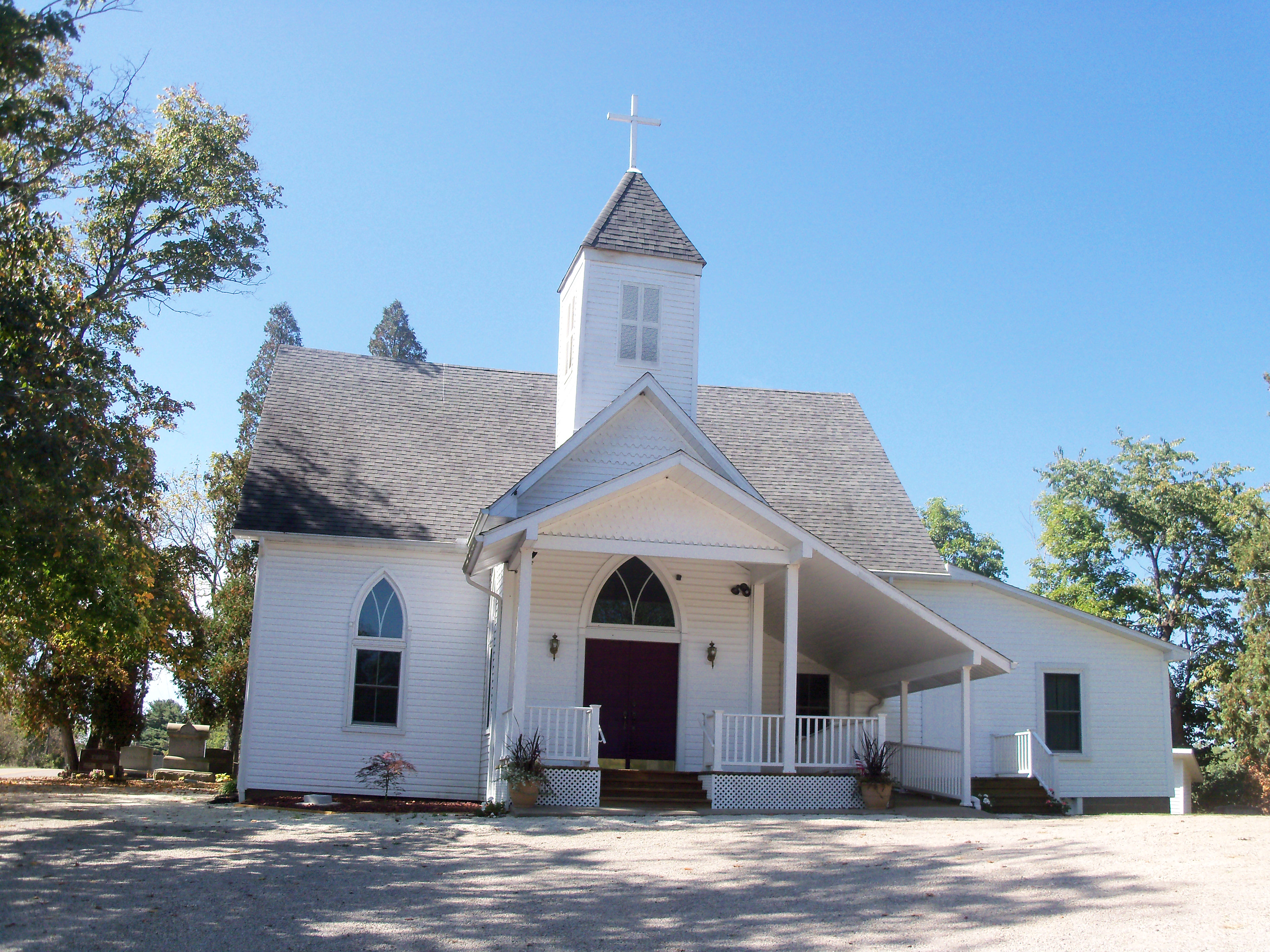
- Pleasant Hill Baptist Church on Route 541

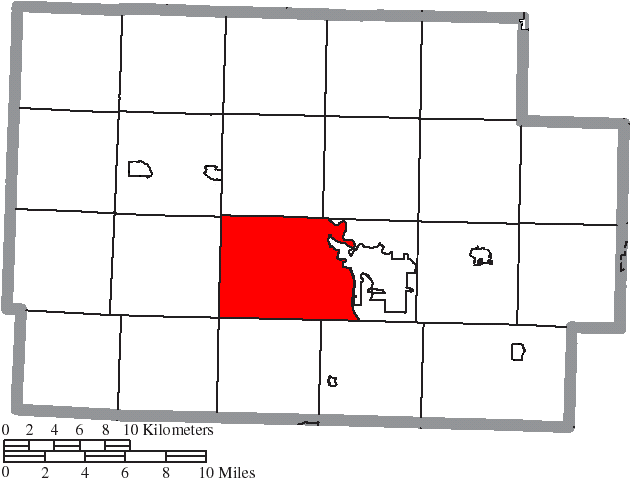
- Location of Jackson Township in Coshocton County
- Coordinates: 40°16′9″N 81°55′40″W
- Country: United States
- State: Ohio
- County: Coshocton

Area
  - Total: 31.7 sq mi (82.2 km^{2})
  - Land: 31.5 sq mi (81.6 km^{2})
  - Water: 0.23 sq mi (0.6 km^{2})
- Elevation: 938 ft (286 m)

Population (2020)
  - Total: 1,852
  - Density: 58.8/sq mi (22.7/km^{2})
- Time zone: UTC-5 (Eastern (EST))
  - Summer (DST): UTC-4 (EDT)
- FIPS code: 39-37730
- GNIS feature ID: 1085916

Jackson Township is one of the twenty-two townships of Coshocton County, Ohio, United States. As of the 2020 census the population was 1,852.

== Geography ==
Located in the southern central part of the county, it borders the following townships:

- Bethlehem Township - north
- Keene Township - northeast
- Tuscarawas Township - east
- Franklin Township - southeast
- Virginia Township - south
- Washington Township - southwest
- Bedford Township - west
- Jefferson Township - northwest corner

No municipalities are located in Jackson Township.

== Name and history ==
Jackson Township was organized in 1828. It was named for Andrew Jackson.

It is one of thirty-seven Jackson Townships statewide.

== Government ==
The township is governed by a three-member board of trustees, who are elected in November of odd-numbered years to a four-year term beginning on the following January 1. Two are elected in the year after the presidential election and one is elected in the year before it. There is also an elected township fiscal officer, who serves a four-year term beginning on April 1 of the year after the election, which is held in November of the year before the presidential election. Vacancies in the fiscal officership or on the board of trustees are filled by the remaining trustees.
