= Perry Township, Coshocton County, Ohio =

Township in Ohio, US

- Township
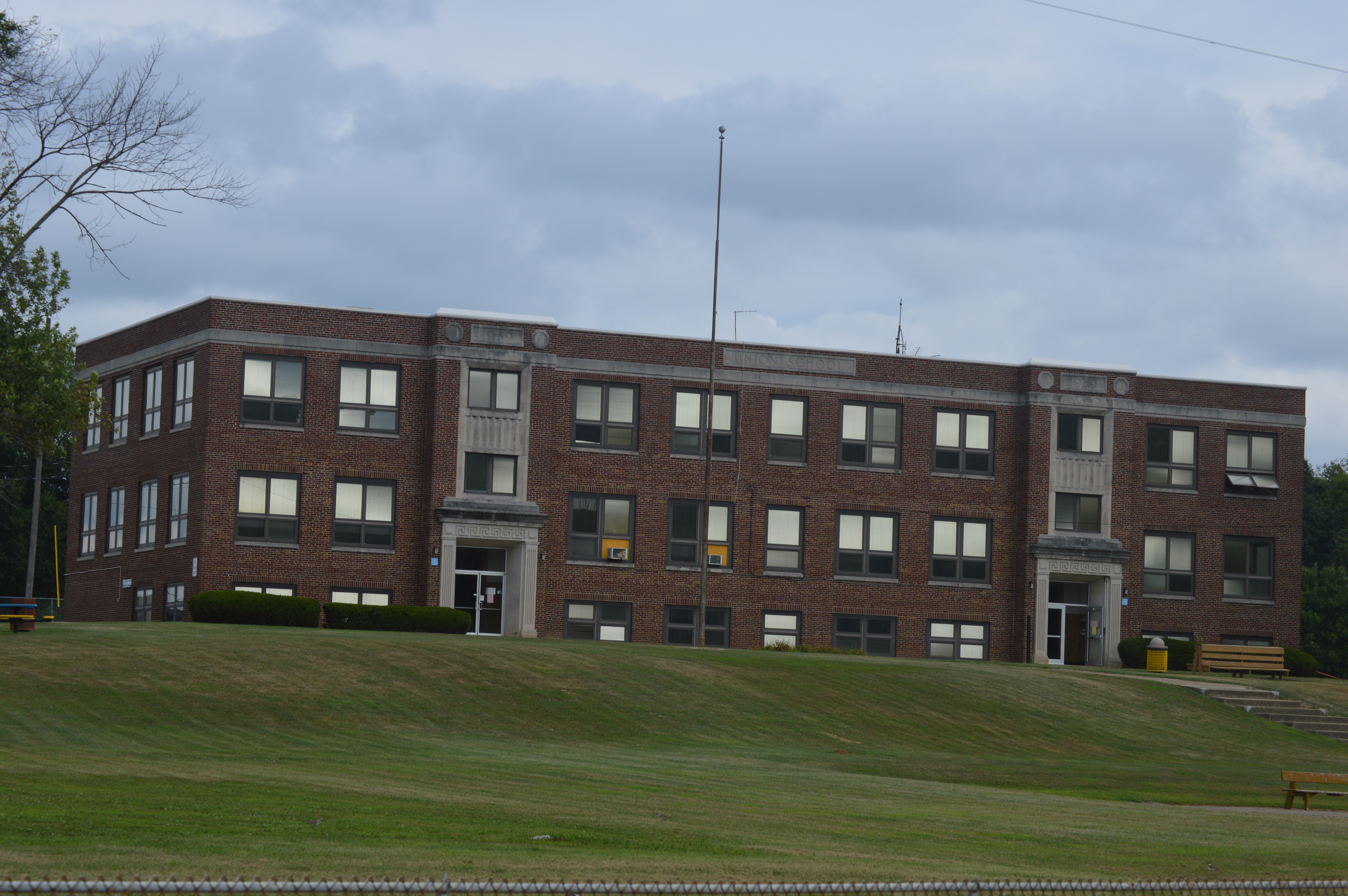
- Union Elementary School on State Route 79

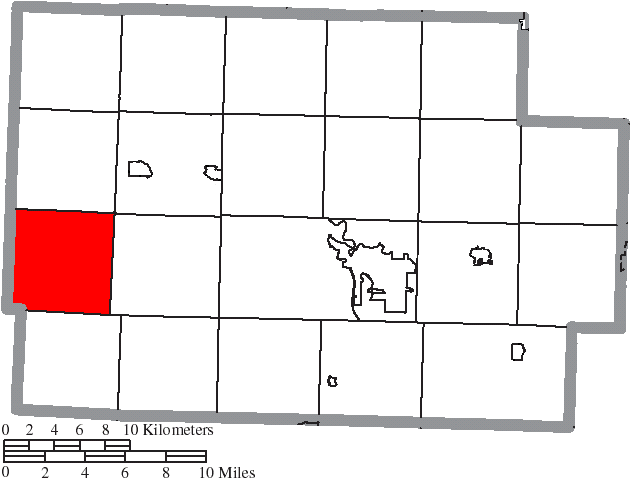
- Location of Perry Township in Coshocton County
- Coordinates: 40°15′54″N 82°9′22″W
- Country: United States
- State: Ohio
- County: Coshocton

Area
  - Total: 25.73 sq mi (66.64 km^{2})
  - Land: 25.72 sq mi (66.62 km^{2})
  - Water: 0.0077 sq mi (0.02 km^{2})
- Elevation: 1,053 ft (321 m)

Population (2020)
  - Total: 635
  - Density: 24.7/sq mi (9.53/km^{2})
- Time zone: UTC-5 (Eastern (EST))
  - Summer (DST): UTC-4 (EDT)
- FIPS code: 39-61812
- GNIS feature ID: 1085925

Perry Township is one of the twenty-two townships of Coshocton County, Ohio, United States. As of the 2020 census the population was 635.

== Geography ==
Located in the far western part of the county, it borders the following townships:

- Newcastle Township - north
- Jefferson Township - northeast corner
- Bedford Township - east
- Pike Township - south
- Fallsbury Township, Licking County - southwest
- Jackson Township, Knox County - west
- Butler Township, Knox County - northwest corner

No municipalities are located in Perry Township, although the unincorporated community of New Guilford lies in the township's northwest.

== Name and history ==
It is one of twenty-six Perry Townships statewide.

Perry Township was organized in 1817. It was named for Oliver Hazard Perry, a hero of the War of 1812.

== Government ==
The township is governed by a three-member board of trustees, who are elected in November of odd-numbered years to a four-year term beginning on the following January 1. Two are elected in the year after the presidential election and one is elected in the year before it. There is also an elected township fiscal officer, who serves a four-year term beginning on April 1 of the year after the election, which is held in November of the year before the presidential election. Vacancies in the fiscal officership or on the board of trustees are filled by the remaining trustees.
