= Jefferson Township, Ohio =

Jefferson Township, Ohio, may refer to:

- Jefferson Township, Adams County, Ohio
- Jefferson Township, Ashtabula County, Ohio
- Jefferson Township, Brown County, Ohio
- Jefferson Township, Clinton County, Ohio
- Jefferson Township, Coshocton County, Ohio
- Jefferson Township, Crawford County, Ohio
- Jefferson Township, Fayette County, Ohio
- Jefferson Township, Franklin County, Ohio
- Jefferson Township, Greene County, Ohio
- Jefferson Township, Guernsey County, Ohio
- Jefferson Township, Jackson County, Ohio
- Jefferson Township, Knox County, Ohio
- Jefferson Township, Logan County, Ohio
- Jefferson Township, Madison County, Ohio
- Jefferson Township, Mercer County, Ohio
- Jefferson Township, Montgomery County, Ohio
- Jefferson Township, Muskingum County, Ohio
- Jefferson Township, Noble County, Ohio
- Jefferson Township, Preble County, Ohio
- Jefferson Township, Richland County, Ohio
- Jefferson Township, Ross County, Ohio
- Jefferson Township, Scioto County, Ohio
- Jefferson Township, Tuscarawas County, Ohio
- Jefferson Township, Williams County, Ohio
