= Washington Township, Coshocton County, Ohio =

Township in Ohio, US

- Township
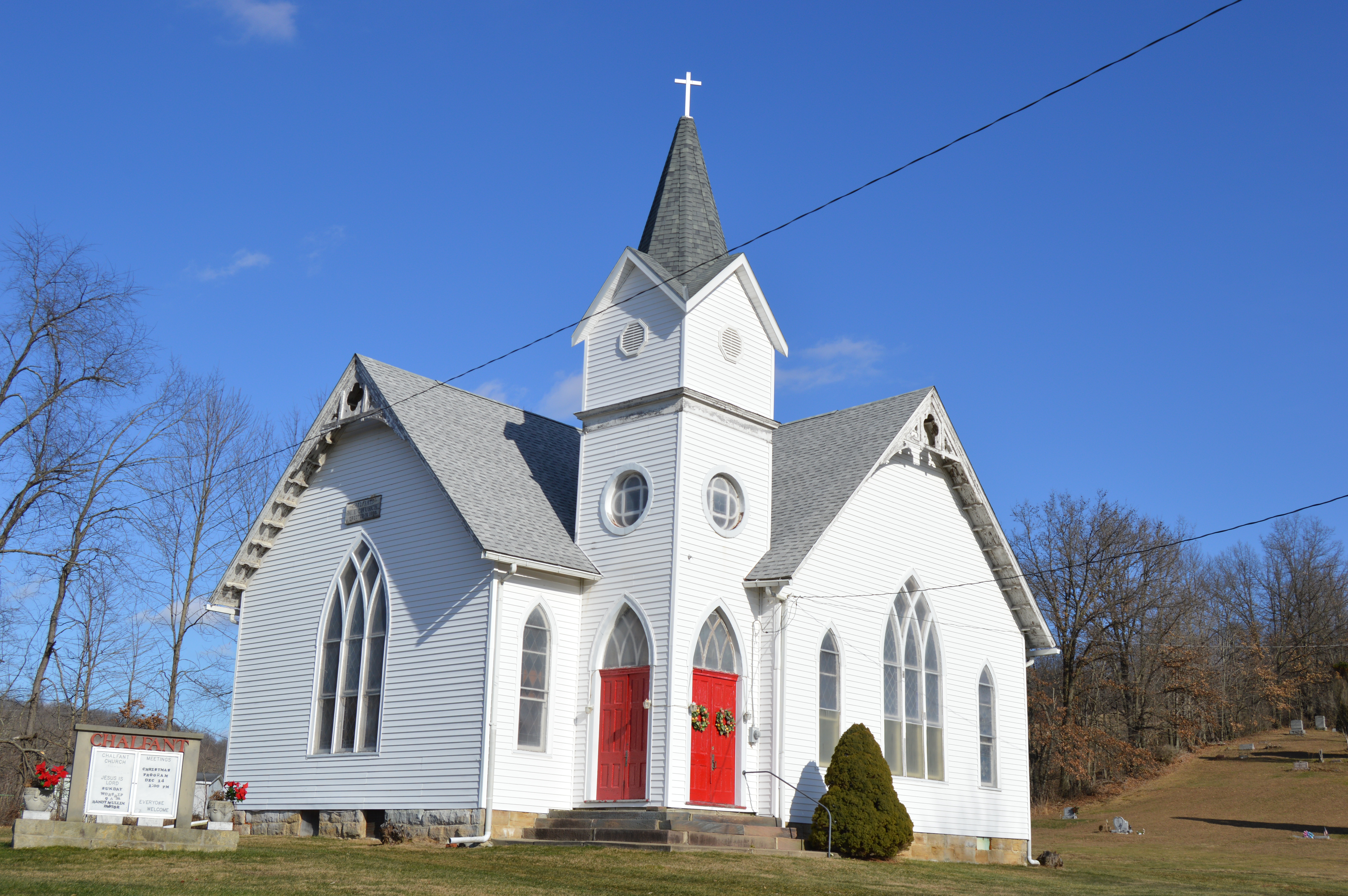
- The Chalfant Church

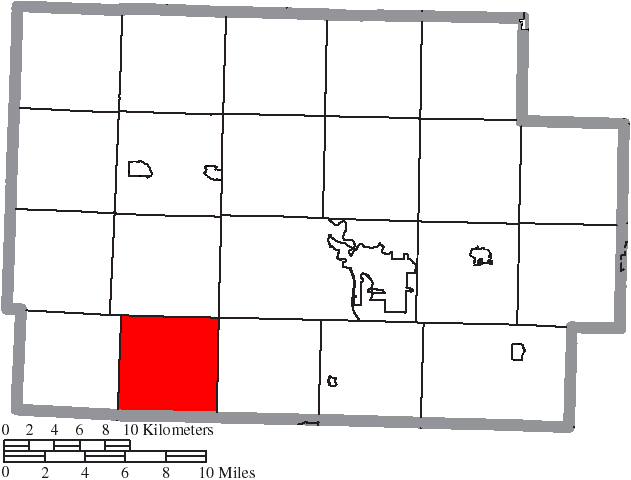
- Location of Washington Township in Coshocton County
- Coordinates: 40°11′54″N 82°2′59″W
- Country: United States
- State: Ohio
- County: Coshocton

Area
  - Total: 24.07 sq mi (62.35 km^{2})
  - Land: 24.05 sq mi (62.29 km^{2})
  - Water: 0.023 sq mi (0.06 km^{2})
- Elevation: 820 ft (250 m)

Population (2020)
  - Total: 727
  - Density: 30.2/sq mi (11.7/km^{2})
- Time zone: UTC-5 (Eastern (EST))
  - Summer (DST): UTC-4 (EDT)
- FIPS code: 39-81172
- GNIS feature ID: 1085930

Washington Township is one of the twenty-two townships of Coshocton County, Ohio, United States. As of the 2020 census the population was 727.

== Geography ==
Located in the southeastern part of the county, it borders the following townships:

- Bedford Township - north
- Jackson Township - northeast
- Virginia Township - east
- Cass Township, Muskingum County - south
- Jackson Township, Muskingum County - southwest corner
- Pike Township - west

No municipalities are located in Washington Township, although the unincorporated community of Wakatomika lies at the center of the township.

== Name and history ==
It is one of forty-three Washington Townships statewide.

Washington Township was organized in 1811, and its first mill was built one year later.

== Government ==
The township is governed by a three-member board of trustees, who are elected in November of odd-numbered years to a four-year term beginning on the following January 1. Two are elected in the year after the presidential election and one is elected in the year before it. There is also an elected township fiscal officer, who serves a four-year term beginning on April 1 of the year after the election, which is held in November of the year before the presidential election. Vacancies in the fiscal officership or on the board of trustees are filled by the remaining trustees.
