= Chalfant Church =

Historic church in Ohio, United States

- U.S. National Register of Historic Places
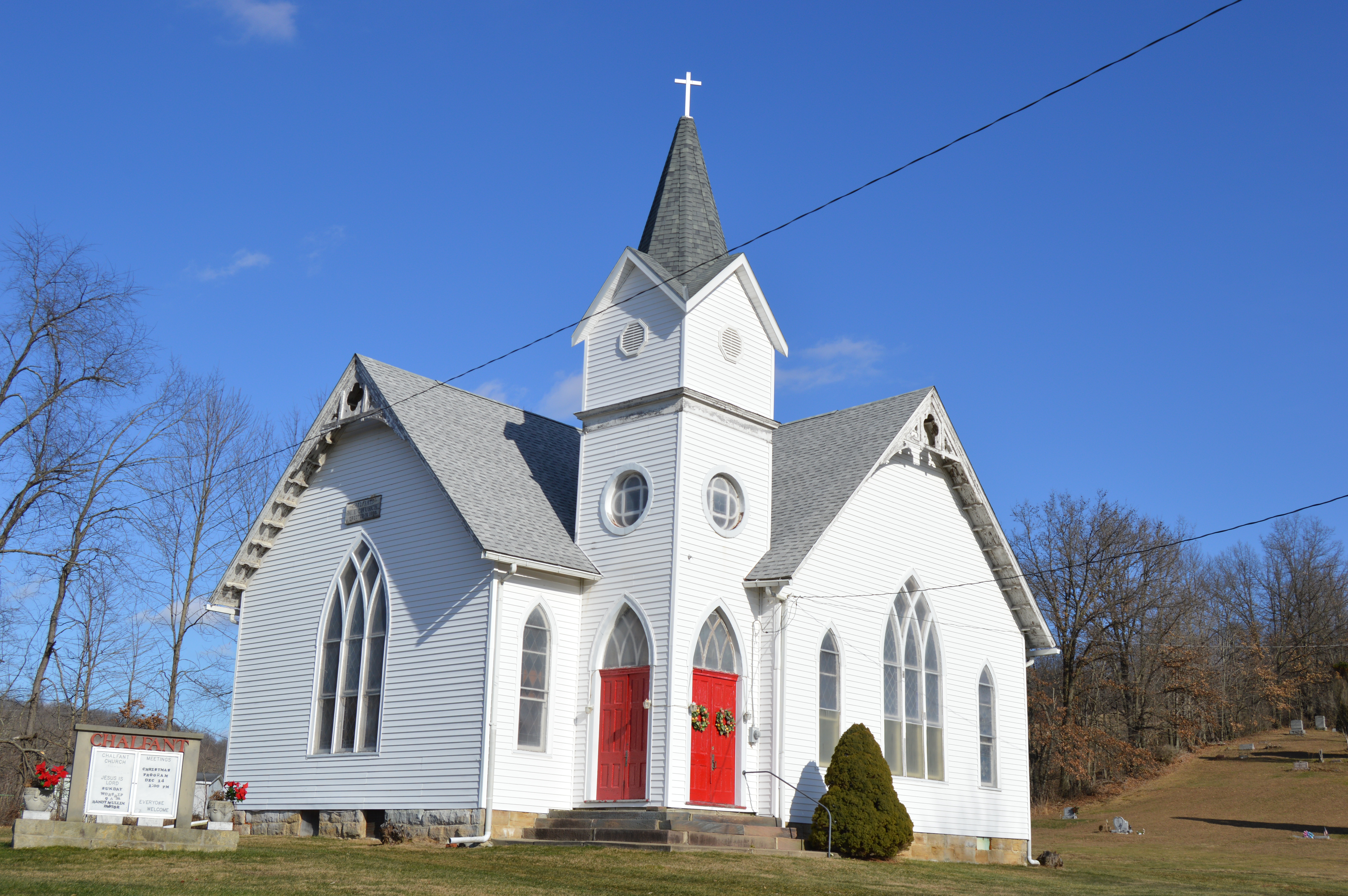
- Western side and front

- Location within Ohio Location within the United States
- Nearest city: Warsaw, Ohio
- Coordinates: 40°10′58″N 82°1′6″W
- Area: 1 acre (0.40 ha)
- Built: 1893
- NRHP reference No.: 82004416
- Added to NRHP: March 15, 1982

Chalfant Church is a historic church in Warsaw in Coshocton County, Ohio. It was the first church in the county; the county was formed in 1810.

The current building, built in 1893, was built on the site of the first church building. It has been suggested to be the finest rural church in its county. It is a wood frame "Victorian Gothic" building, (Note: It may be termed Carpenter Gothic.) built on a sandstone foundation with a cross-shaped plan. It has intersecting slate-covered gable roofs. A small cemetery rises up a hill behind.

It was added to the National Register in 1982.
