= Jefferson Township, Coshocton County, Ohio =

Township in Ohio, US

- Township
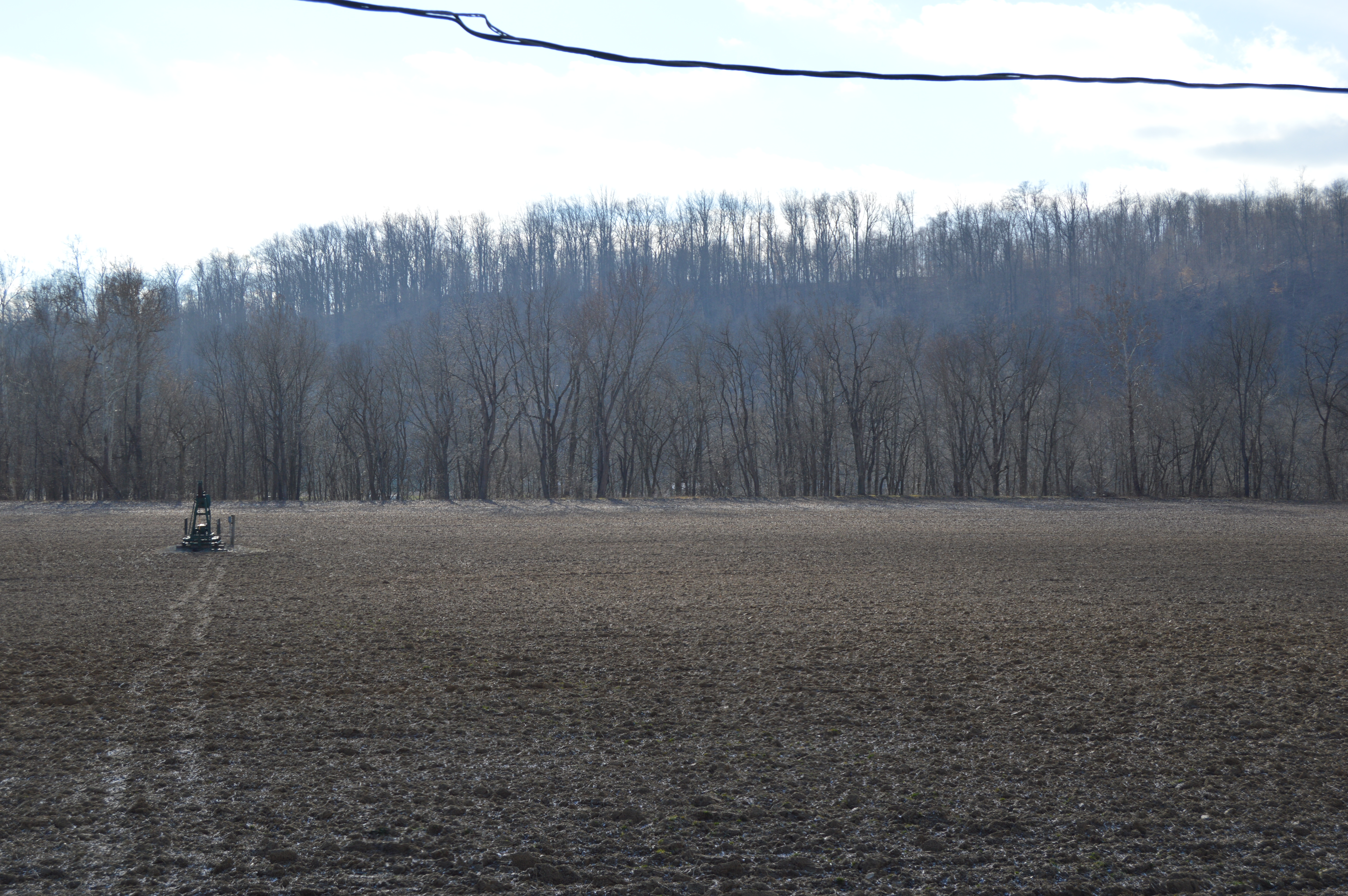
- Fields east of Walhonding, Ohio

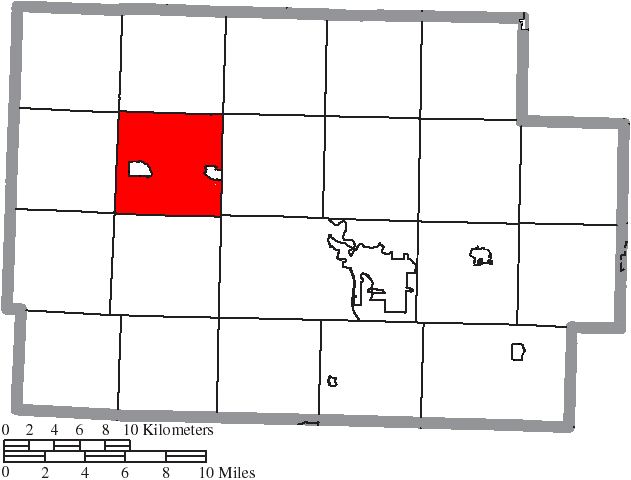
- Location of Jefferson Township in Coshocton County
- Coordinates: 40°20′14″N 82°1′24″W
- Country: United States
- State: Ohio
- County: Coshocton

Area
  - Total: 26.36 sq mi (68.26 km^{2})
  - Land: 26.32 sq mi (68.18 km^{2})
  - Water: 0.031 sq mi (0.08 km^{2})
- Elevation: 794 ft (242 m)

Population (2020)
  - Total: 1,461
  - Density: 55.50/sq mi (21.43/km^{2})
- Time zone: UTC-5 (Eastern (EST))
  - Summer (DST): UTC-4 (EDT)
- FIPS code: 39-38556
- GNIS feature ID: 1085917

Jefferson Township is one of the twenty-two townships of Coshocton County, Ohio, United States. The 2020 census reported 1,461 people living in the township.

== Geography ==
Located in the northwestern part of the county, it borders the following townships:

- Monroe Township - north
- Clark Township - northeast corner
- Bethlehem Township - east
- Jackson Township - southeast corner
- Bedford Township - south
- Perry Township - southwest corner
- Newcastle Township - west
- Tiverton Township - northwest corner

Two villages are located in Jefferson Township: Nellie in the west, and Warsaw in the east.

== Name and history ==
Jefferson Township was organized in 1826.

It is one of twenty-four Jefferson Townships statewide.

== Government ==
The township is governed by a three-member board of trustees, who are elected in November of odd-numbered years to a four-year term beginning on the following January 1. Two are elected in the year after the presidential election and one is elected in the year before it. There is also an elected township fiscal officer, who serves a four-year term beginning on April 1 of the year after the election, which is held in November of the year before the presidential election. Vacancies in the fiscal officership or on the board of trustees are filled by the remaining trustees.
