= Layland, Ohio =

- Unincorporated community
- Location within Ohio Location within the United States
- Coordinates: 40°26′10″N 81°58′01″W
- Country: United States
- State: Ohio
- County: Coshocton
- Elevation: 797 ft (243 m)
- Time zone: UTC-5 (Eastern (EST))
  - Summer (DST): UTC-4 (EDT)
- Area code: 740
- GNIS feature ID: 1048911

Layland is an unincorporated community in Coshocton County, Ohio, United States.
