= Jefferson Township, Muskingum County, Ohio =

Township in Ohio, US

- Township
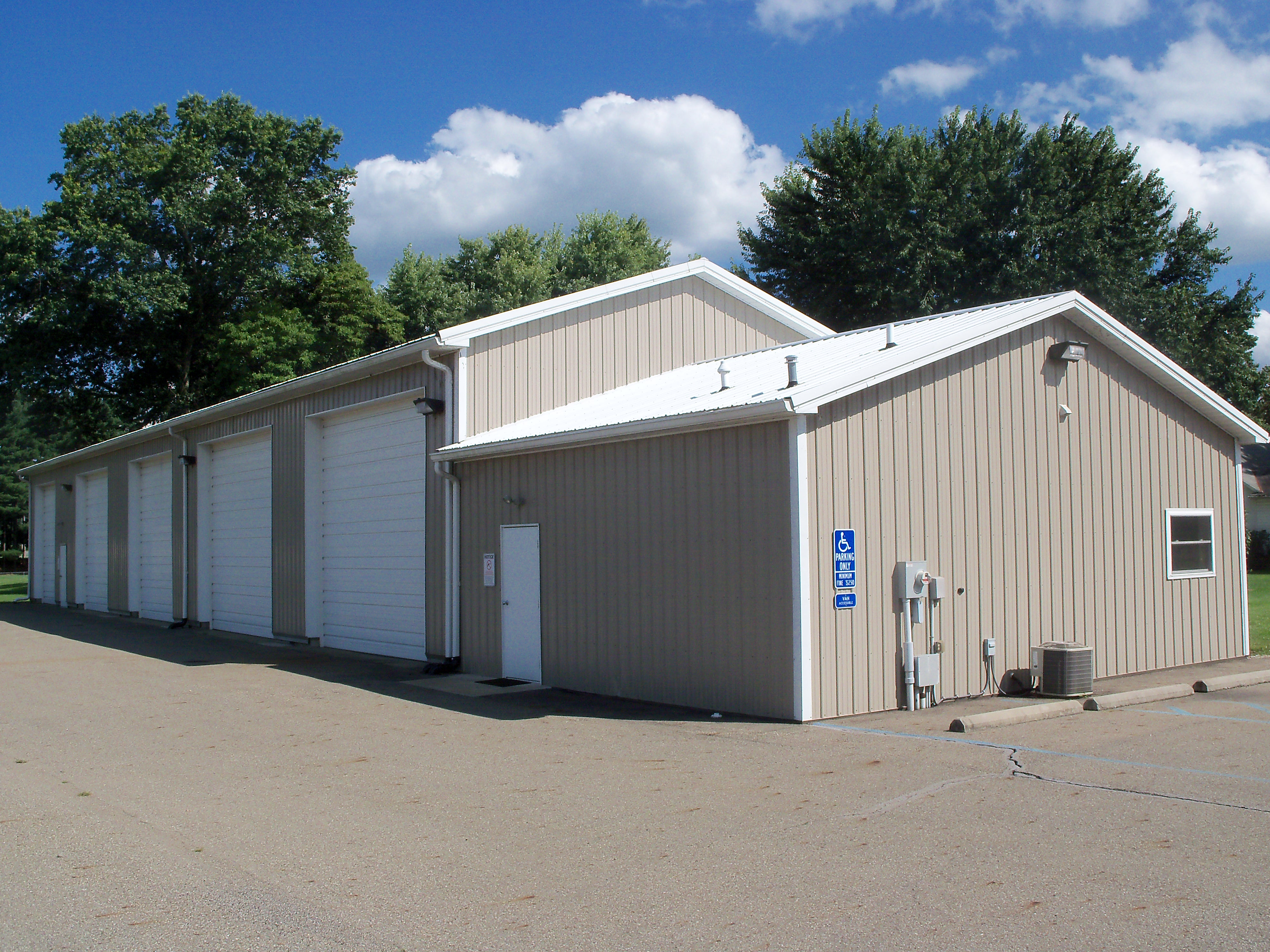
- Jefferson Township Meeting Hall on Main Street

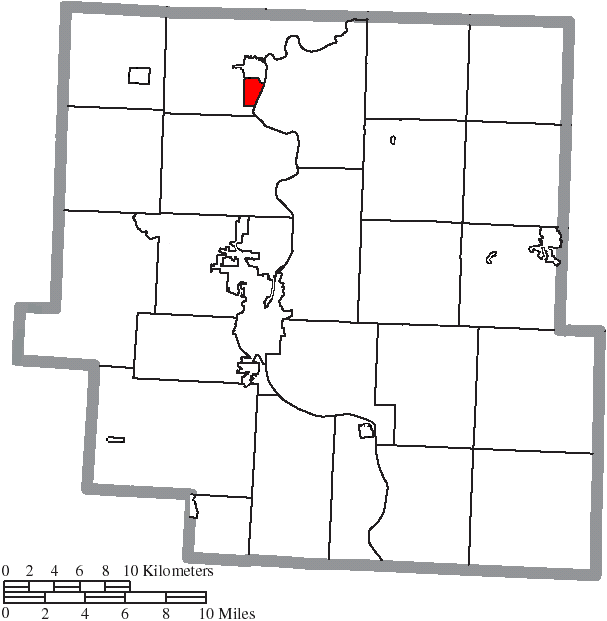
- Location of Jefferson Township in Muskingum County
- Coordinates: 40°7′3″N 82°0′42″W
- Country: United States
- State: Ohio
- County: Muskingum

Area
  - Total: 2.2 sq mi (5.6 km^{2})
  - Land: 2.0 sq mi (5.3 km^{2})
  - Water: 0.12 sq mi (0.3 km^{2})
- Elevation: 738 ft (225 m)

Population (2020)
  - Total: 1,850
  - Density: 900/sq mi (350/km^{2})
- Time zone: UTC-5 (Eastern (EST))
  - Summer (DST): UTC-4 (EDT)
- FIPS code: 39-38752
- GNIS feature ID: 1086723

Jefferson Township is one of the twenty-five townships of Muskingum County, Ohio, United States. The 2020 census found 1,850 people in the township

== Geography ==
Located in the northern part of the county, it borders the following townships:

- Madison Township - east
- Cass Township - west

Most of the village of Dresden is located in northern Jefferson Township.

== Name and history ==
It is one of twenty-four Jefferson Townships statewide.

Jefferson Township was described in 1833 as having one church, two flouring mills, three saw mills, and six physicians.

== Government ==
The township is governed by a three-member board of trustees, who are elected in November of odd-numbered years to a four-year term beginning on the following January 1. Two are elected in the year after the presidential election and one is elected in the year before it. There is also an elected township fiscal officer, who serves a four-year term beginning on April 1 of the year after the election, which is held in November of the year before the presidential election. Vacancies in the fiscal officership or on the board of trustees are filled by the remaining trustees.
