= West Bedford, Ohio =

Unincorporated community in Ohio, United States

Coordinates: 40°15′33″N 82°04′36″W

West Bedford is an unincorporated community in Bedford Township, Coshocton County, Ohio, United States.

== History ==
West Bedford was laid out in 1817. The community's name is derived from Bedford County, Pennsylvania, the native home of Doreen Peterson Kinninger, an early settler. A post office was established at West Bedford in 1819, and remained in operation until 1955.
