= Bedford Township, Coshocton County, Ohio =

Township in Ohio, US

- Township
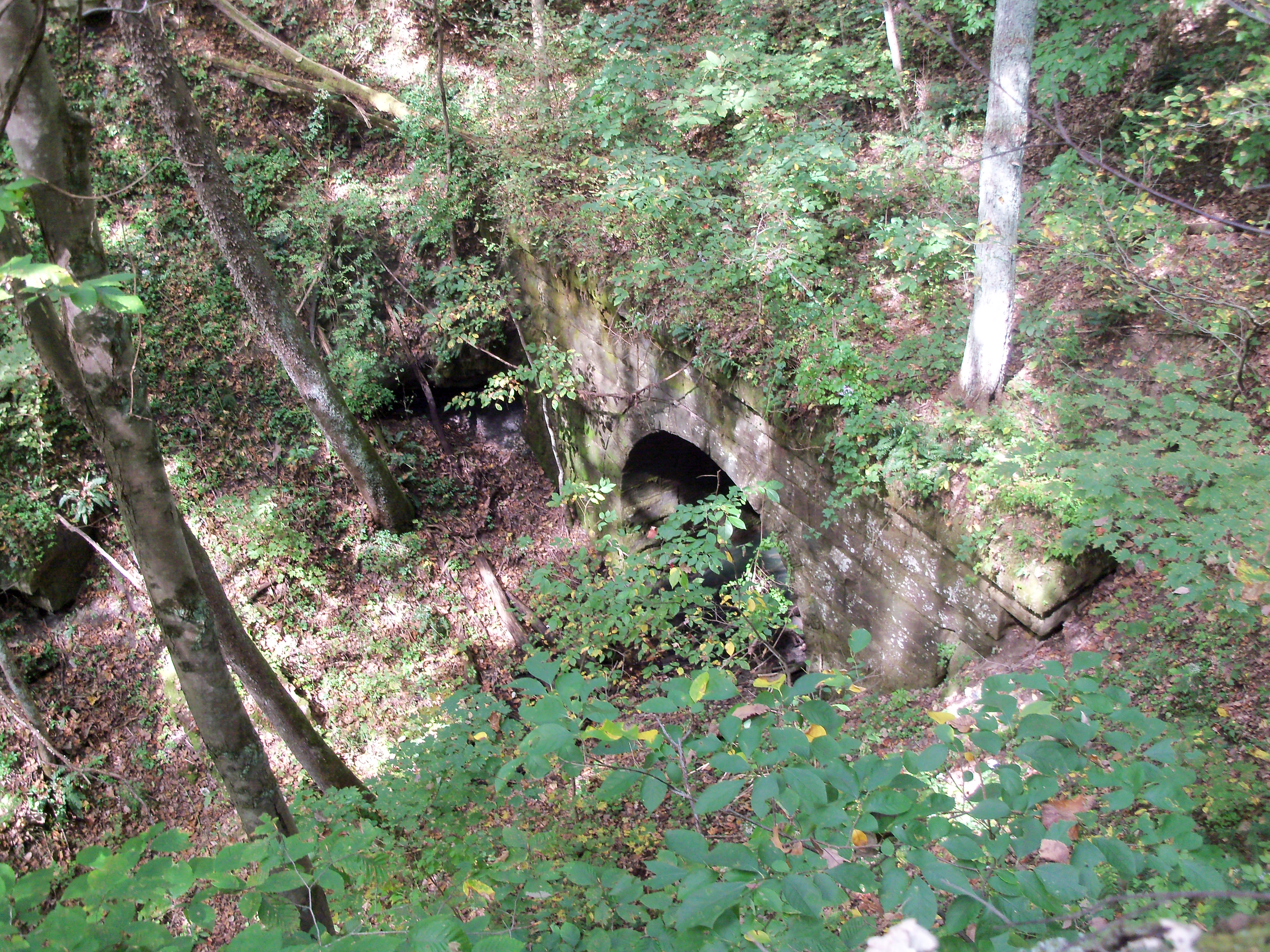
- The 1887 Noland Railroad Tunnel was abandoned in 1936

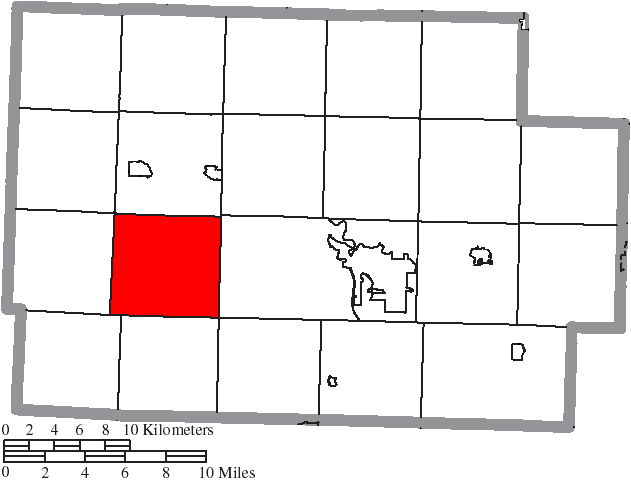
- Location of Bedford Township in Coshocton County
- Coordinates: 40°15′37″N 82°2′7″W
- Country: United States
- State: Ohio
- County: Coshocton

Area
  - Total: 26.7 sq mi (69.2 km^{2})
  - Land: 26.7 sq mi (69.2 km^{2})
  - Water: 0 sq mi (0.0 km^{2})
- Elevation: 935 ft (285 m)

Population (2020)
  - Total: 604
  - Density: 22.6/sq mi (8.73/km^{2})
- Time zone: UTC-5 (Eastern (EST))
  - Summer (DST): UTC-4 (EDT)
- FIPS code: 39-04864
- GNIS feature ID: 1085910

Bedford Township is one of the twenty-two townships of Coshocton County, Ohio, United States. As of the 2020 census the population was 604.

== Geography ==
Located in the southwestern part of the county, it borders the following townships:

- Jefferson Township - north
- Bethlehem Township - northeast corner
- Jackson Township - east
- Washington Township - south
- Pike Township - southwest
- Perry Township - west
- Newcastle Township - northwest corner

No municipalities are located in Bedford Township, although the unincorporated communities of Tunnel Hill and West Bedford lie in the township's central and western sections, respectively.

== Name and history ==
Bedford Township was organized in 1825. Many of its first settlers were natives of Bedford County, Pennsylvania, hence the name.

Statewide, the only other Bedford Township is located in Meigs County.

== Government ==
The township is governed by a three-member board of trustees, who are elected in November of odd-numbered years to a four-year term beginning on the following January 1. Two are elected in the year after the presidential election and one is elected in the year before it. There is also an elected township fiscal officer, who serves a four-year term beginning on April 1 of the year after the election, which is held in November of the year before the presidential election. Vacancies in the fiscal officership or on the board of trustees are filled by the remaining trustees.
