= Newcastle Township, Coshocton County, Ohio =

Township in Ohio, US

- Township
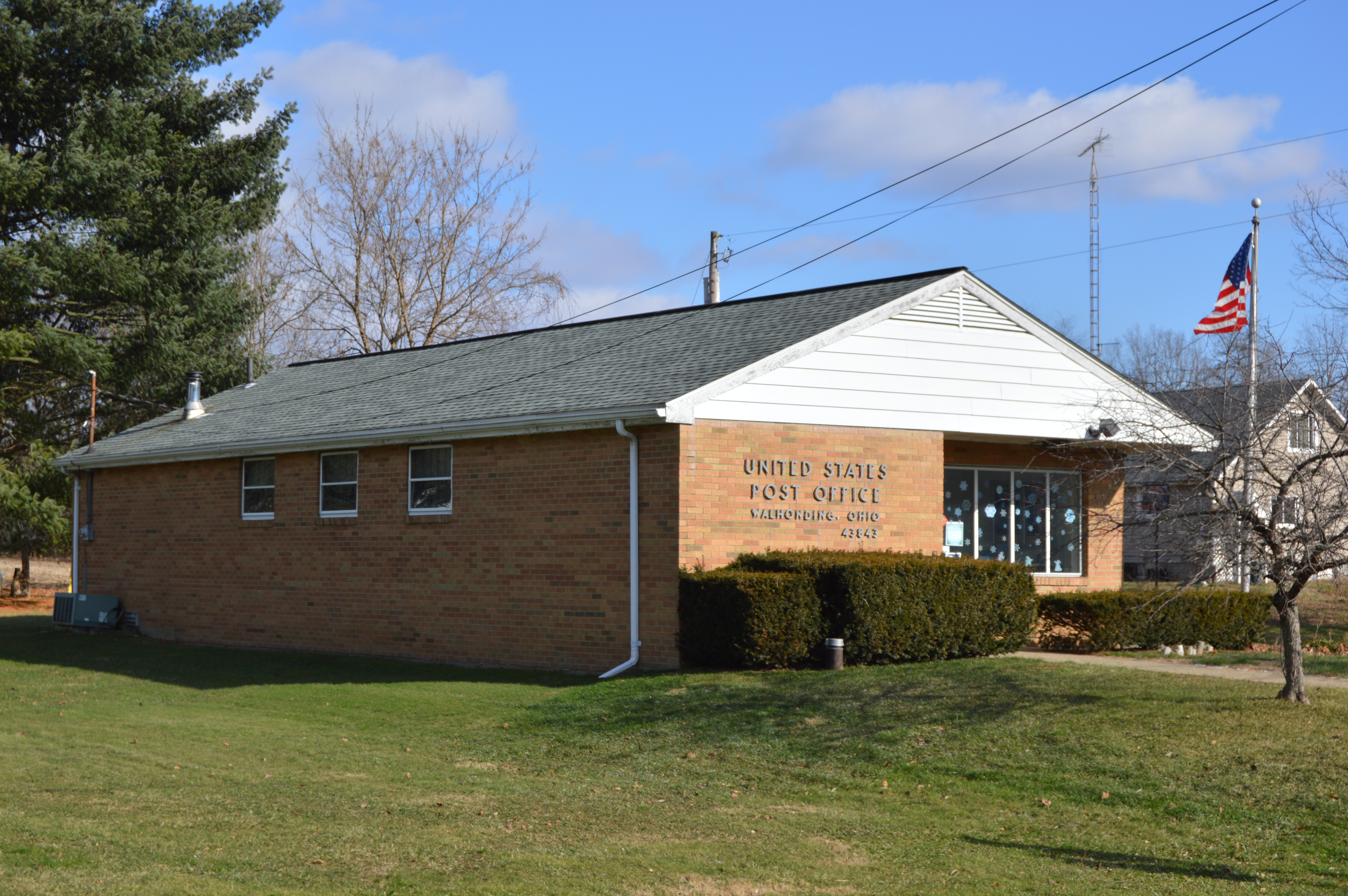
- Post office at Walhonding

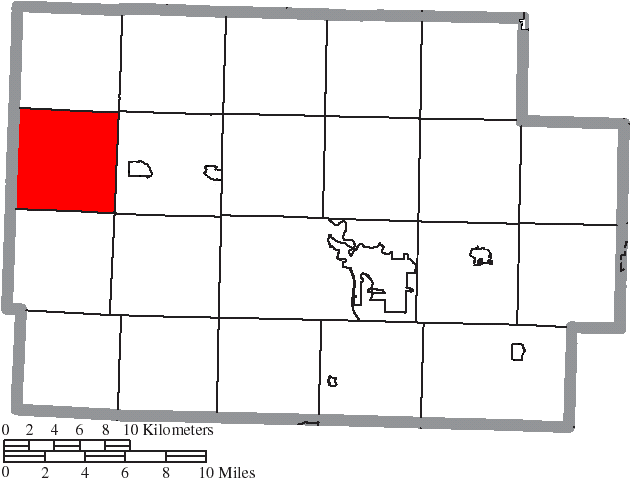
- Location of Newcastle Township in Coshocton County
- Coordinates: 40°20′51″N 82°8′7″W
- Country: United States
- State: Ohio
- County: Coshocton

Area
  - Total: 25.83 sq mi (66.89 km^{2})
  - Land: 25.81 sq mi (66.86 km^{2})
  - Water: 0.012 sq mi (0.03 km^{2})
- Elevation: 820 ft (250 m)

Population (2020)
  - Total: 442
  - Density: 17.1/sq mi (6.61/km^{2})
- Time zone: UTC-5 (Eastern (EST))
  - Summer (DST): UTC-4 (EDT)
- FIPS code: 39-54376
- GNIS feature ID: 1085923

Newcastle Township is one of the twenty-two townships of Coshocton County, Ohio, United States. As of the 2020 census the population was 442.

== Geography ==
Located in the far western part of the county, it borders the following townships:

- Tiverton Township - north
- Monroe Township - northeast corner
- Jefferson Township - east
- Bedford Township - southeast corner
- Perry Township - south
- Jackson Township, Knox County - southwest corner
- Butler Township, Knox County - west
- Union Township, Knox County - northwest corner

No municipalities are located in Newcastle Township, although the unincorporated communities of Walhonding and Newcastle lie in the northern and southwestern parts of the township respectively.

== Name and history ==
It is the only Newcastle Township statewide.

Newcastle Township was organized in 1811. Newcastle Township, also historically spelled New Castle, was named after New Castle, Delaware.

== Government ==
The township is governed by a three-member board of trustees, who are elected in November of odd-numbered years to a four-year term beginning on the following January 1. Two are elected in the year after the presidential election and one is elected in the year before it. There is also an elected township fiscal officer, who serves a four-year term beginning on April 1 of the year after the election, which is held in November of the year before the presidential election. Vacancies in the fiscal officership or on the board of trustees are filled by the remaining trustees.
