= New Guilford, Ohio =

Unincorporated community in Ohio, United States

Coordinates: 40°17′27″N 82°09′42″W

New Guilford is an unincorporated community in Perry Township, Coshocton County, Ohio, United States.

== History ==
New Guilford was laid out in 1825 by Dr. Elisha Guilford Lee. A post office was established at New Guilford in 1826, and remained in operation until 1924.
