= Plainfield, Ohio =

- Village
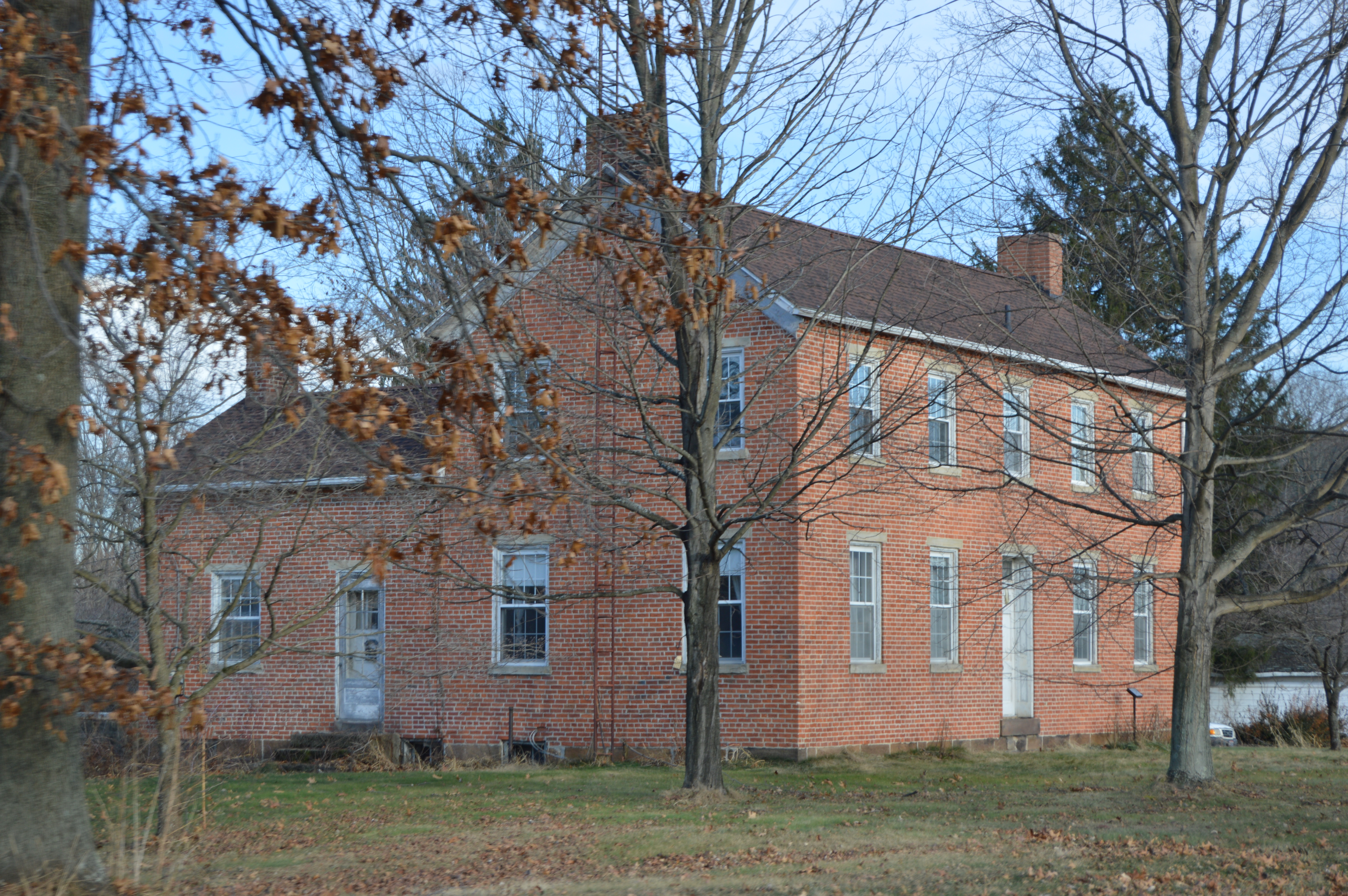
- The Thomas Johnson House on Main Street

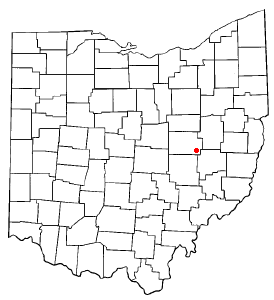
- Location of Plainfield, Ohio

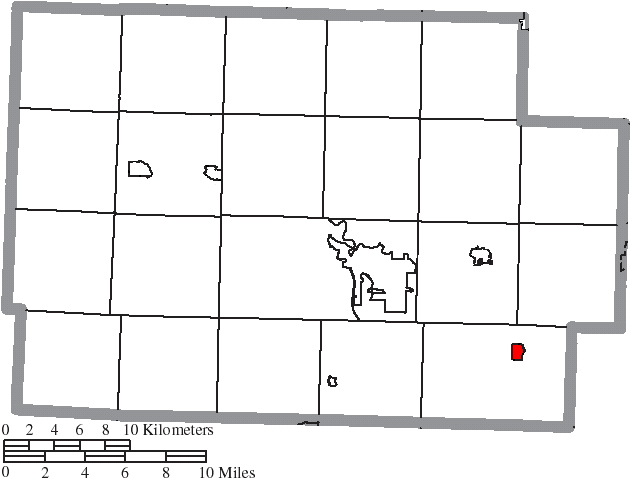
- Location of Plainfield in Coshocton County
- Coordinates: 40°12′18″N 81°43′05″W
- Country: United States
- State: Ohio
- County: Coshocton
- Township: Linton

Government
  - Mayor: Michael LaVigne

Area
  - Total: 0.39 sq mi (1.02 km^{2})
  - Land: 0.39 sq mi (1.02 km^{2})
  - Water: 0 sq mi (0.00 km^{2})
- Elevation: 791 ft (241 m)

Population (2020)
  - Total: 141
  - Density: 359.6/sq mi (138.83/km^{2})
- Time zone: UTC-5 (Eastern (EST))
  - Summer (DST): UTC-4 (EDT)
- ZIP code: 43836
- Area code: 740
- FIPS code: 39-63044
- GNIS feature ID: 2399683

Plainfield is a village in Coshocton County, Ohio, United States, along Wills Creek. The population was 141 at the 2020 census.

== History ==
Plainfield was laid out in 1816. It was named from its setting upon the plains. By 1833, businesses in Plainfield included one store and one tavern. Plainfield was incorporated as a village in 1878.

== Geography ==
According to the United States Census Bureau, the village has a total area of 0.41 square miles (1.06 km^{2}), all land.

== Demographics ==
Historical population
| Census | Pop. | Note | %± |
|---|---|---|---|
| 1860 | 30 | | — |
| 1880 | 300 | | — |
| 1890 | 234 | | −22.0% |
| 1900 | 255 | | 9.0% |
| 1910 | 215 | | −15.7% |
| 1920 | 172 | | −20.0% |
| 1930 | 183 | | 6.4% |
| 1940 | 130 | | −29.0% |
| 1950 | 136 | | 4.6% |
| 1960 | 178 | | 30.9% |
| 1970 | 183 | | 2.8% |
| 1980 | 221 | | 20.8% |
| 1990 | 178 | | −19.5% |
| 2000 | 158 | | −11.2% |
| 2010 | 157 | | −0.6% |
| 2020 | 141 | | −10.2% |
U.S. Decennial Census

=== 2010 census ===
As of the census of 2010, there were 157 people, 69 households, and 46 families living in the village. The population density was 382.9 inhabitants per square mile (147.8/km^{2}). There were 76 housing units at an average density of 185.4 per square mile (71.6/km^{2}). The racial makeup of the village was 96.8% White, 0.6% African American, and 2.5% from two or more races.

There were 69 households, of which 20.3% had children under the age of 18 living with them, 58.0% were married couples living together, 5.8% had a female householder with no husband present, 2.9% had a male householder with no wife present, and 33.3% were non-families. 29.0% of all households were made up of individuals, and 14.5% had someone living alone who was 65 years of age or older. The average household size was 2.28 and the average family size was 2.74.

The median age in the village was 50.5 years. 19.1% of residents were under the age of 18; 6.4% were between the ages of 18 and 24; 18.4% were from 25 to 44; 37.6% were from 45 to 64; and 18.5% were 65 years of age or older. The gender makeup of the village was 49.0% male and 51.0% female.

=== 2000 census ===
As of the census of 2000, there were 158 people, 66 households, and 45 families living in the village. The population density was 377.4 inhabitants per square mile (145.7/km^{2}). There were 72 housing units at an average density of 172.0 per square mile (66.4/km^{2}). The racial makeup of the village was 98.73% White, 0.63% Asian, and 0.63% from two or more races.

There were 66 households, out of which 28.8% had children under the age of 18 living with them, 57.6% were married couples living together, 4.5% had a female householder with no husband present, and 31.8% were non-families. 30.3% of all households were made up of individuals, and 9.1% had someone living alone who was 65 years of age or older. The average household size was 2.39 and the average family size was 2.93.

In the village, the population was spread out, with 21.5% under the age of 18, 7.6% from 18 to 24, 36.1% from 25 to 44, 18.4% from 45 to 64, and 16.5% who were 65 years of age or older. The median age was 39 years. For every 100 females there were 100.0 males. For every 100 females age 18 and over, there were 113.8 males.

The median income for a household in the village was $39,821, and the median income for a family was $41,806. Males had a median income of $25,625 versus $15,833 for females. The per capita income for the village was $16,441. None of the families and 2.6% of the population were living below the poverty line.
