= Virginia Township, Coshocton County, Ohio =

Township in Ohio, US

- Township
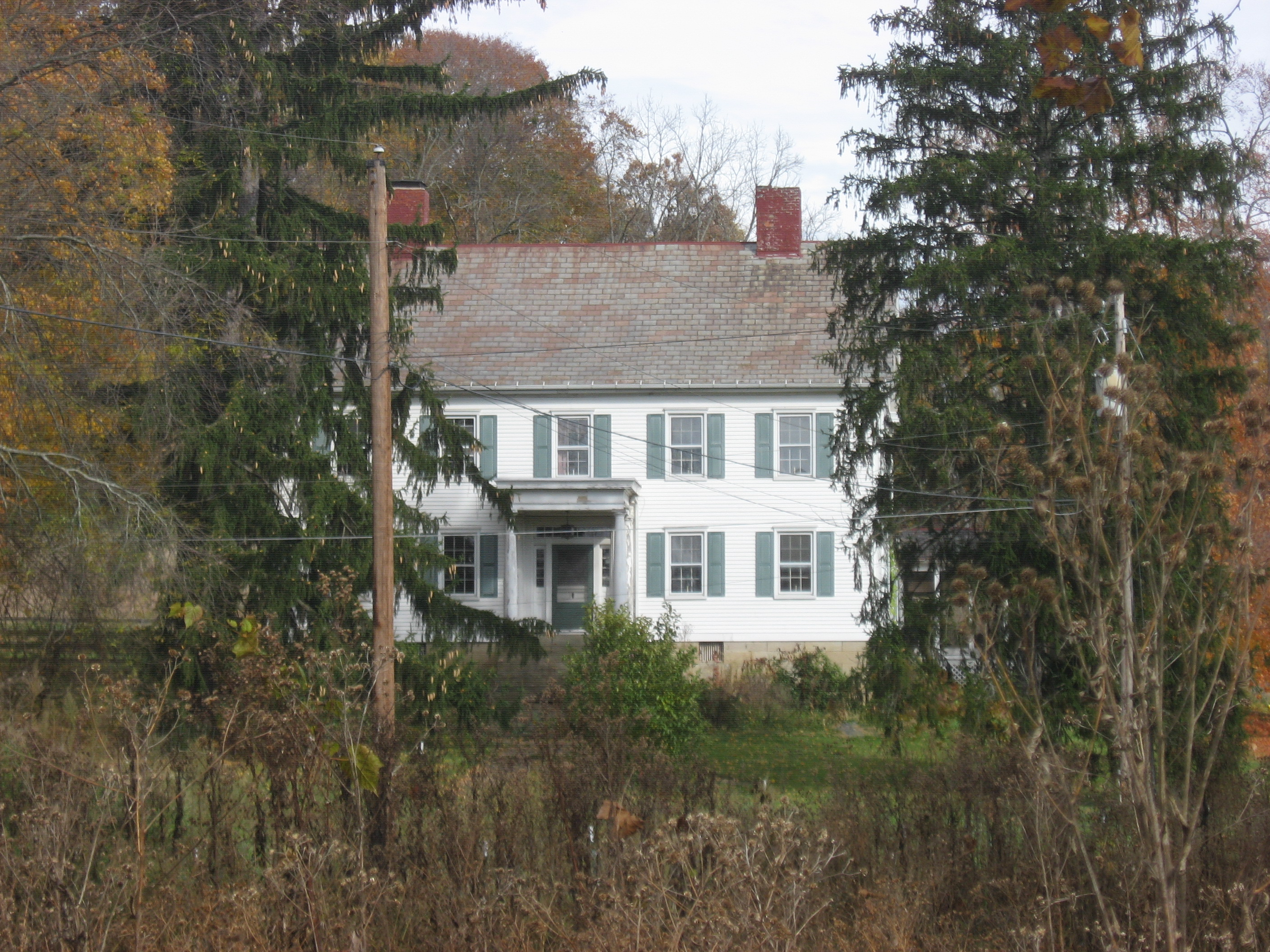
- The Adams-Gray House

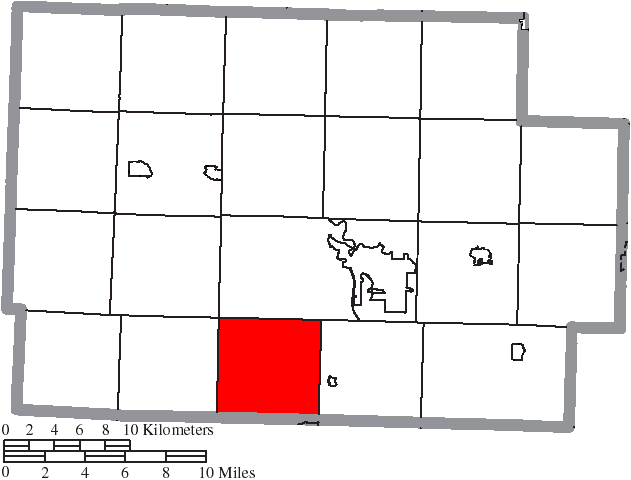
- Location of Virginia Township in Coshocton County
- Coordinates: 40°11′24″N 81°56′28″W
- Country: United States
- State: Ohio
- County: Coshocton

Area
  - Total: 25.1 sq mi (64.9 km^{2})
  - Land: 24.8 sq mi (64.3 km^{2})
  - Water: 0.19 sq mi (0.5 km^{2})
- Elevation: 804 ft (245 m)

Population (2020)
  - Total: 563
  - Density: 22.7/sq mi (8.76/km^{2})
- Time zone: UTC-5 (Eastern (EST))
  - Summer (DST): UTC-4 (EDT)
- FIPS code: 39-80220
- GNIS feature ID: 1085929

Virginia Township is one of the 22 townships of Coshocton County, Ohio, United States. At the 2020 census, the population was 563.

== Geography ==
Located in the southern part of the county, it borders the following townships:

- Jackson Township - north
- Franklin Township - east
- Adams Township, Muskingum County - southeast corner
- Cass Township, Muskingum County - south
- Washington Township - west

No municipalities are located in Virginia Township, although the unincorporated communities of New Moscow and Willowbrook are located in the township's north.

== Name and history ==
Named for Virginia, the former home state of most of its early settlers, it is the only Virginia Township in the state.

Virginia Township was organized in 1828. The first permanent settler in the township was Richard Tilton, a native of Redstone Old Fort in Pennsylvania, who established himself there in late 1805. Baptists were the first church to organize in the township, starting a congregation on Section 16 either in 1816 or 1818, while the township's first school was formed in 1818.

== Government ==
The township is governed by a three-member board of trustees, who are elected in November of odd-numbered years to a four-year term beginning on the following January 1. Two are elected in the year after the presidential election and one is elected in the year before it. There is also an elected township fiscal officer, who serves a four-year term beginning on April 1 of the year after the election, which is held in November of the year before the presidential election. Vacancies in the fiscal officership or on the board of trustees are filled by the remaining trustees.
