= Coshocton County Courthouse =

Local government building in Ohio, US

- U.S. National Register of Historic Places
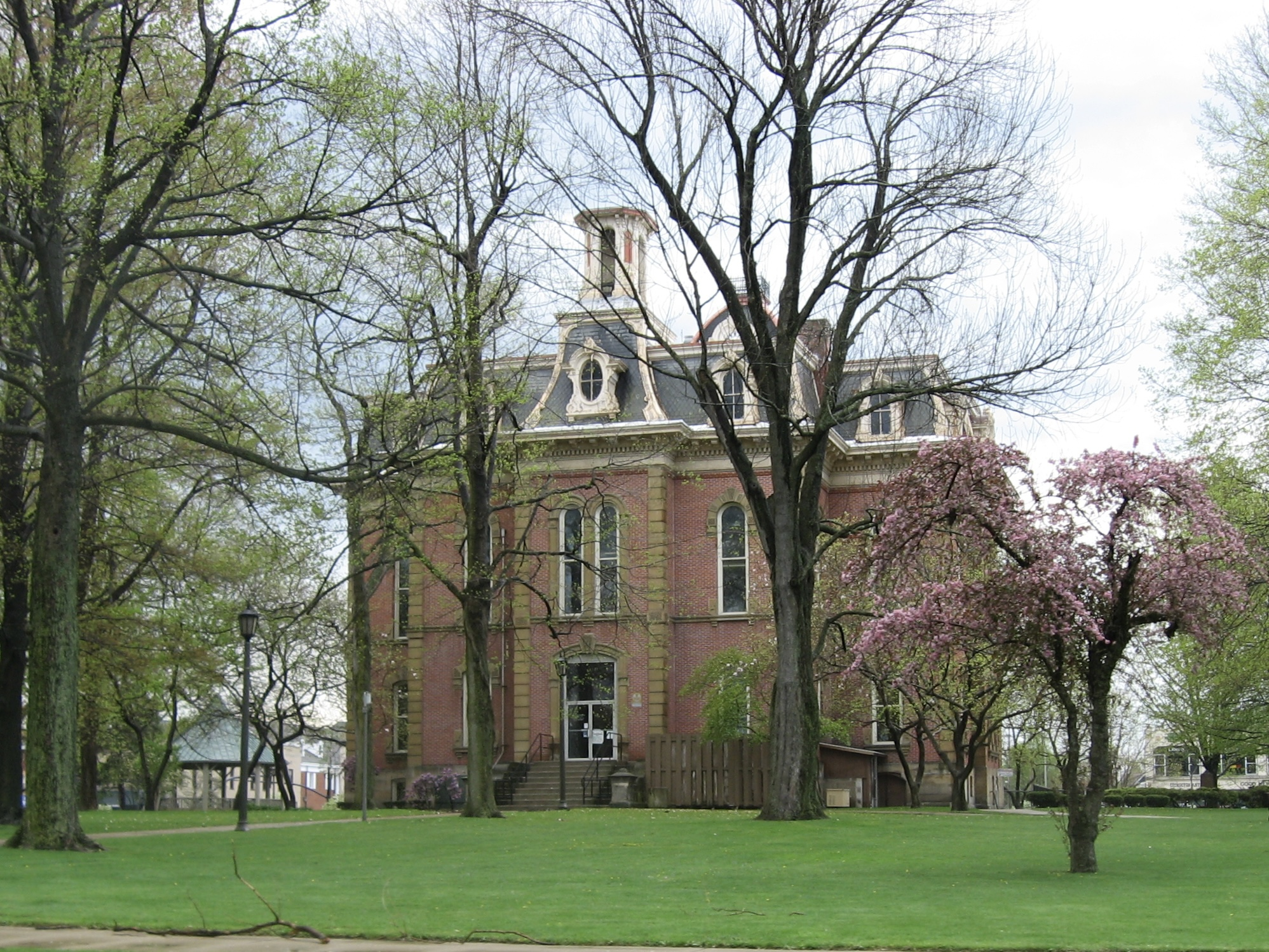
- Rear of the courthouse

- Location within Ohio Location within the United States
- Interactive map showing the location for Coshocton County Courthouse
- Location: 318 Main Street, Coshocton, Ohio, United States, 43812
- Coordinates: 40°16′27″N 81°51′59″W
- Built: 1873
- Architect: Carpenter & Williams
- Architectural style: Second Empire
- NRHP reference No.: 73001402
- Added to NRHP: May 22, 1973

The Coshocton County Courthouse, designed in Second Empire style, is a historic courthouse building located at 349 Main Street in Coshocton, Ohio. It was added to the National Register of Historic Places on May 22, 1973.

== History ==
Coshocton County was established in 1811 with the county seat placed at Coshocton. The courts first met in Colonel Charles Williams Tavern and paid the owner $300 a year for rent. The county found this amount too large for the budget and instead turned to another location, a building owned by Wilson McGowan. The courts remained in this location until 1824, when an actual courthouse was built.

The courthouse was located in the central business district on a landscaped public square, which is still the current site. The building cost almost $2,000 to construct and furnish and was two stories tall. A central bell tower crowned the building and contained a bell that would also be used in the next courthouse.

The 1824 courthouse was showing its age and use by a growing population. The county officials were soon looking for plans for a new courthouse. These plans were drawn up by the architectural firm of Carpenter & Williams from Meadville, Pennsylvania in the Second Empire style with some Italianate touches. (From the extreme similarity in architectural form it appears that Carpenter & Williams drew on the 1862 building plans of Chapman Hall—on the campus of today's University of Mount Union in Alliance, Ohio—which was completed in 1864.) The final cost was $100,000 but has remained virtually unchanged since it was finished in 1875.

== Exterior ==
The courthouse is constructed of red brick with stone quoins. The main building is a rectangular base with a projected bay with a central projected tower. The first-floor windows are long rectangles with decorative mouldings, and the second-floor windows are long, arched windows. The mansard roof rests on a decorative entablature with dormers and white trim.

The tower contains the entrance reached by a flight of steps. The windows reaching to the top are two sets of arched windows with decorative recessed bays, with the top window being palladian style. The mansard roof of the tower contains a pair of arched windows; a clock rests above each pair of windows and was once housed in the original courthouse. The top of the tower is capped by a balcony with wrought-iron railing.
