= Walhonding, Ohio =

Unincorporated community in Ohio, U.S.

Coordinates: 40°21′34″N 82°08′49″W

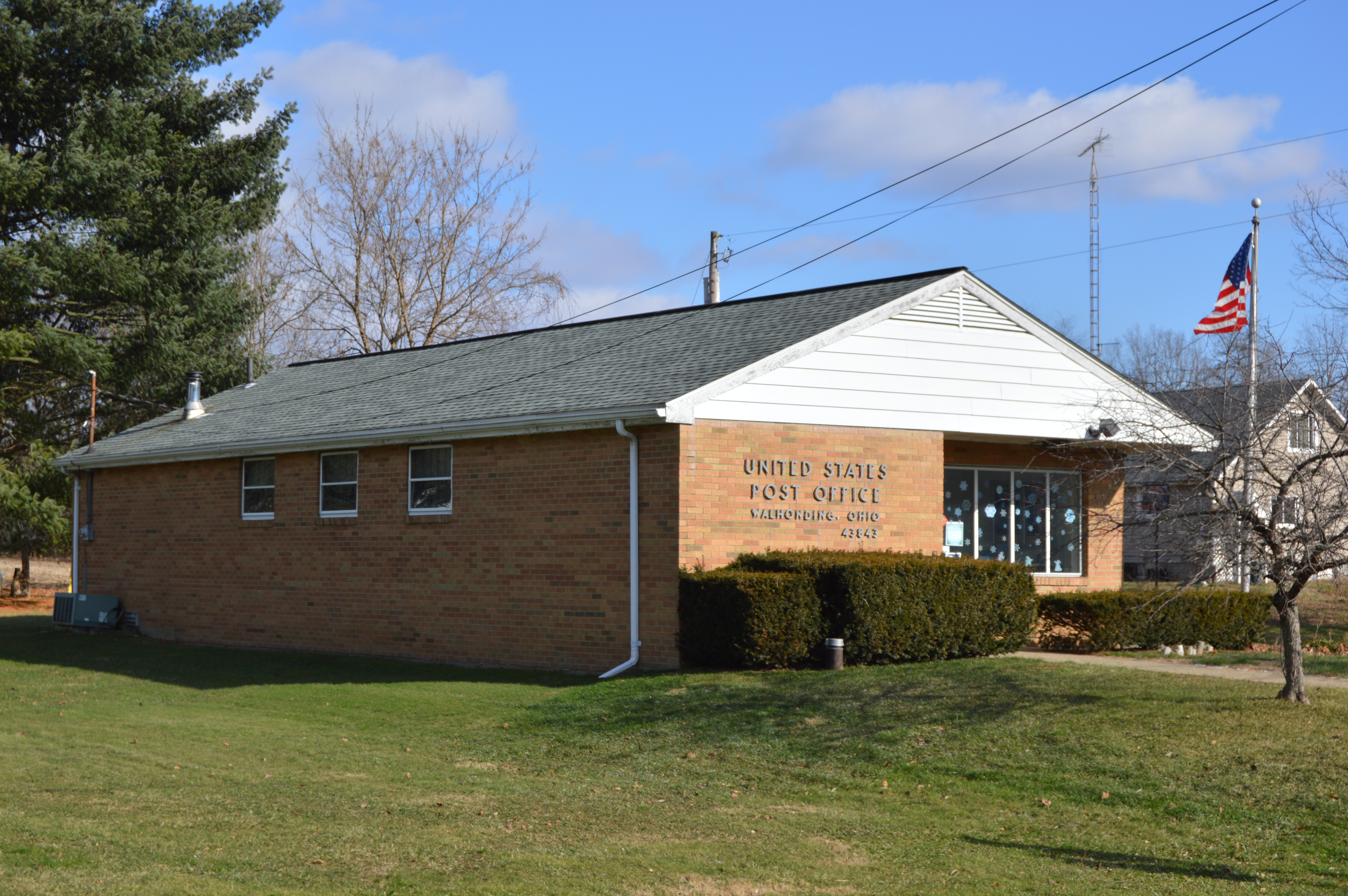
Post office

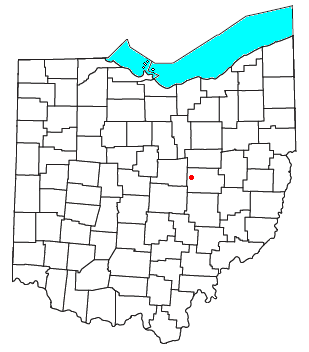
Location of Walhonding, Ohio

Walhonding is an unincorporated community in northern Newcastle Township, Coshocton County, Ohio, United States. It has a post office with the ZIP code 43843. It lies at the intersection of State Routes 206 and 715.

== History ==
Walhonding was platted in 1841, when construction of the Walhonding Canal reached that point. A post office called Walhonding has been in operation since 1839.
