= Newcastle, Ohio =

Coordinates: 40°20′06″N 82°09′57″W

Newcastle is an unincorporated community in Newcastle Township, Coshocton County, Ohio, United States.

== History ==
Newcastle was laid out in 1808. A post office called New Castle was established in 1833, and remained in operation until 1929.
