= Coshocton County, Ohio =

County in Ohio, United States

- County
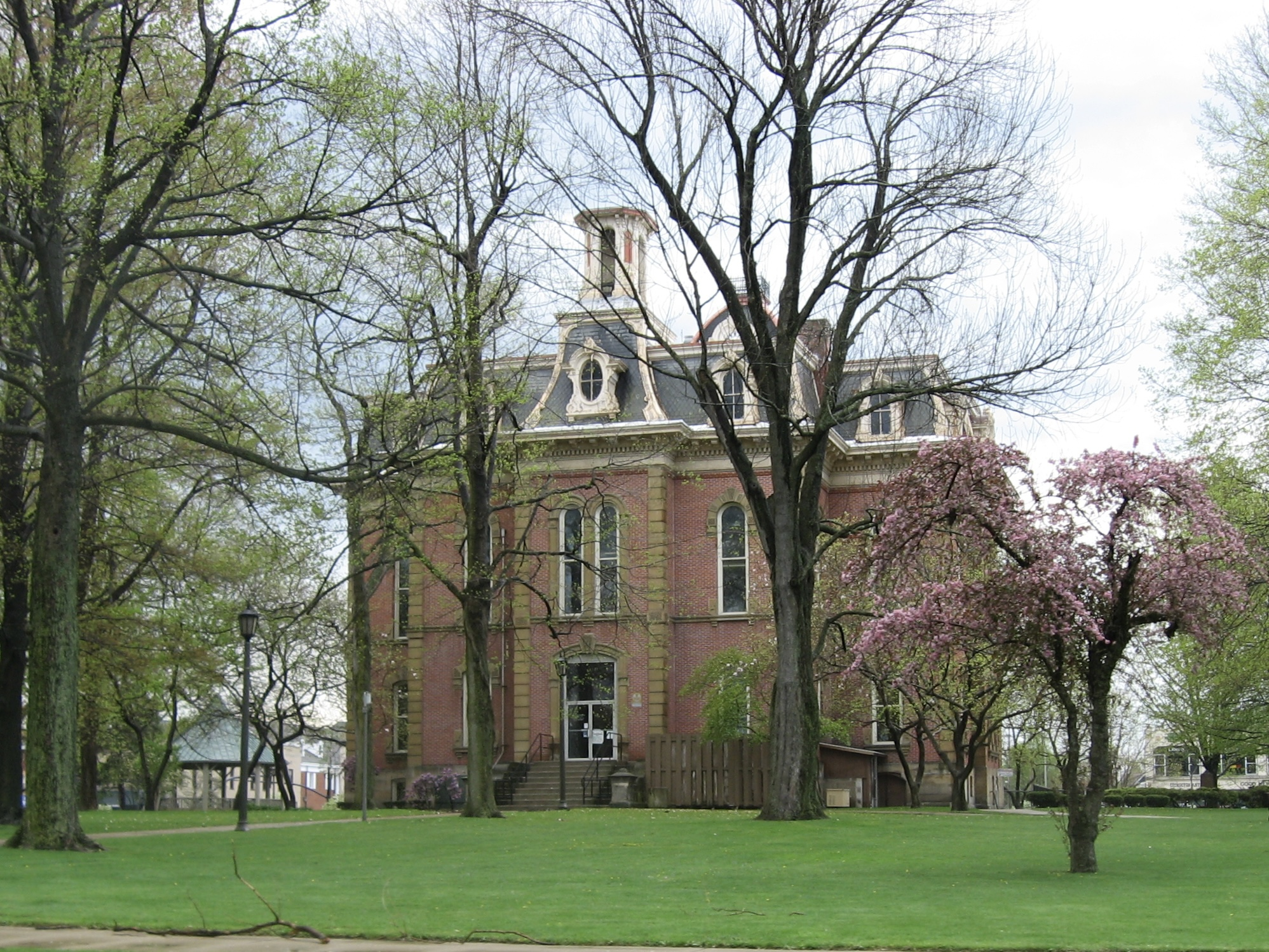
- Coshocton County Courthouse

- Flag Seal

- Location within the U.S. state of Ohio
- Coordinates: 40°18′N 81°55′W
- Country: United States
- State: Ohio
- Founded: April 1, 1811
- Named for: "union of waters" or "black bear crossing" in Delaware (Lenape) language
- Seat: Coshocton
- Largest city: Coshocton

Area
  - Total: 567 sq mi (1,470 km^{2})
  - Land: 564 sq mi (1,460 km^{2})
  - Water: 3.6 sq mi (9.3 km^{2}) 0.6%

Population (2020)
  - Total: 36,612
  - Estimate (2025): 37,188 ▲
  - Density: 65.8/sq mi (25.4/km^{2})
- Time zone: UTC−5 (Eastern)
  - Summer (DST): UTC−4 (EDT)
- Congressional district: 12th
- Website: www.coshoctoncounty.net

Coshocton County is a county located in the U.S. state of Ohio. As of the 2020 census, the population was 36,612. Its county seat and largest city is Coshocton. The county lies within the Appalachian region of the state. The county was formed on January 31, 1810, from portions of Muskingum and Tuscarawas Counties and later organized in 1811. Its name comes from the Delaware Indian language and has been translated as "union of waters" or "black bear crossing". Coshocton was mentioned by David Zeisberger in his diary from the 1780s using the German spelling "Goschachgünk". The Coshocton, OH Micropolitan Statistical Area includes all of Coshocton County.

== Geography ==
According to the U.S. Census Bureau, the county has a total area of 567 square miles (1,470 km^{2}), of which 564 square miles (1,460 km^{2}) is land and 3.6 square miles (9.3 km^{2}) (0.6%) is water.

=== Adjacent counties ===
- Holmes County (north)
- Tuscarawas County (east)
- Guernsey County (southeast)
- Muskingum County (south)
- Licking County (southwest)
- Knox County (west)

== Demographics ==
Historical population
Census	Pop.	Note	%±
1820	7,086		—
1830	11,161		57.5%
1840	21,590		93.4%
1850	25,674		18.9%
1860	25,032		−2.5%
1870	23,600		−5.7%
1880	26,642		12.9%
1890	26,703		0.2%
1900	29,337		9.9%
1910	30,121		2.7%
1920	29,595		−1.7%
1930	28,976		−2.1%
1940	30,594		5.6%
1950	31,141		1.8%
1960	32,224		3.5%
1970	33,486		3.9%
1980	36,024		7.6%
1990	35,427		−1.7%
2000	36,655		3.5%
2010	36,901		0.7%
2020	36,612		−0.8%
2025 (est.)	37,188	▲	1.6%
U.S. Decennial Census:

=== 2020 census ===
As of the 2020 census, the county had a population of 36,612. The median age was 41.2 years. 24.4% of residents were under the age of 18 and 19.7% of residents were 65 years of age or older. For every 100 females there were 98.6 males, and for every 100 females age 18 and over there were 95.6 males age 18 and over.

The racial makeup of the county was 94.9% White, 1.1% Black or African American, 0.2% American Indian and Alaska Native, 0.3% Asian, <0.1% Native Hawaiian and Pacific Islander, 0.3% from some other race, and 3.2% from two or more races. Hispanic or Latino residents of any race comprised 1.1% of the population.

33.7% of residents lived in urban areas, while 66.3% lived in rural areas.

There were 14,621 households in the county, of which 29.5% had children under the age of 18 living in them. Of all households, 50.3% were married-couple households, 17.6% were households with a male householder and no spouse or partner present, and 24.4% were households with a female householder and no spouse or partner present. About 28.1% of all households were made up of individuals and 13.8% had someone living alone who was 65 years of age or older.

There were 16,324 housing units, of which 10.4% were vacant. Among occupied housing units, 72.3% were owner-occupied and 27.7% were renter-occupied. The homeowner vacancy rate was 1.6% and the rental vacancy rate was 7.1%.

=== Racial and ethnic composition ===
Coshocton County, Ohio – racial and ethnic composition Note: the US Census treats Hispanic/Latino as an ethnic category. This table excludes Latinos from the racial categories and assigns them to a separate category. Hispanics/Latinos may be of any race.
Race / Eethnicity (NH = Non-Hispanic)	Pop 1980	Pop 1990	Pop 2000	Pop 2010	Pop 2020	% 1980	% 1990	% 2000	% 2010	% 2020
White alone (NH)	35,345	34,723	35,557	35,632	34,582	98.12%	98.01%	97.00%	96.56%	94.46%
Black or African American alone (NH)	414	414	395	391	389	1.15%	1.17%	1.08%	1.06%	1.06%
Native American or Alaska Native alone (NH)	28	67	54	78	57	0.08%	0.19%	0.15%	0.21%	0.16%
Asian alone (NH)	89	112	118	103	98	0.25%	0.32%	0.32%	0.28%	0.27%
Native Hawaiian or Pacific Islander alone (NH)	x	x	10	2	7	x	x	0.03%	0.01%	0.02%
Other race alone (NH)	17	5	10	18	47	0.05%	0.01%	0.03%	0.05%	0.13%
Mixed-race or multiracial (NH)	x	x	295	398	1,031	x	x	0.80%	1.08%	2.82%
Hispanic or Latino (any race)	131	106	216	279	401	0.36%	0.30%	0.59%	0.76%	1.10%
Total	36,024	35,427	36,655	36,901	36,612	100.00%	100.00%	100.00%	100.00%	100.00%

=== 2010 census ===
As of the 2010 United States census, there were 36,901 people, 14,658 households, and 10,089 families living in the county. The population density was 65.4 inhabitants per square mile (25.3/km^{2}). There were 16,545 housing units at an average density of 29.3 units per square mile (11.3 units/km^{2}). The racial makeup of the county was 97.0% white, 1.1% black or African American, 0.3% Asian, 0.2% American Indian, 0.2% from other races, and 1.2% from two or more races. Those of Hispanic or Latino origin made up 0.8% of the population. In terms of ancestry, 29.5% were German, 14.2% were Irish, 11.2% were English, and 10.3% were American.

Of the 14,658 households, 30.8% had children under the age of 18 living with them, 53.7% were married couples living together, 10.4% had a female householder with no husband present, 31.2% were non-families, and 26.3% of all households were made up of individuals. The average household size was 2.49 and the average family size was 2.98. The median age was 40.8 years.

The median income for a household in the county was $39,469 and the median income for a family was $47,931. Males had a median income of $39,701 versus $26,706 for females. The per capita income for the county was $19,635. About 12.4% of families and 17.0% of the population were below the poverty line, including 26.0% of those under age 18 and 8.3% of those age 65 or over.

=== 2000 census ===
As of the census of 2000, there were 36,655 people, 14,356 households, and 10,164 families living in the county. The population density was 65 inhabitants per square mile (25/km^{2}). There were 16,107 housing units at an average density of 29 units per square mile (11/km^{2}). The racial makeup of the county was 97.35% White, 1.09% Black or African American, 0.17% Native American, 0.32% Asian, 0.03% Pacific Islander, 0.20% from other races, and 0.84% from two or more races. 0.59% of the population were Hispanic or Latino of any race. 29.4% were of German, 23.4% Croatian, 11.6% English and 9.3% Irish ancestry according to Census 2000. 93.9% spoke English, 2.4% German, 1.5% Pennsylvania Dutch, and 0.9% Dutch as their first language.

There were 14,356 households, out of which 32.60% had children under the age of 18 living with them, 57.80% were married couples living together, 9.20% had a female householder with no husband present, and 29.20% were non-families. 25.40% of all households were made up of individuals, and 11.90% had someone living alone who was 65 years of age or older. The average household size was 2.52 and the average family size was 3.01.

In the county, the population was spread out, with 26.20% under the age of 18, 7.80% from 18 to 24, 27.40% from 25 to 44, 24.00% from 45 to 64, and 14.70% who were 65 years of age or older. The median age was 38 years. For every 100 females, there were 95.50 males. For every 100 females age 18 and over, there were 92.70 males.

The median income for a household in the county was $34,701, and the median income for a family was $41,676. Males had a median income of $31,095 versus $21,276 for females. The per capita income for the county was $16,364. About 7.00% of families and 9.10% of the population were below the poverty line, including 10.40% of those under age 18 and 9.10% of those age 65 or over.

=== Amish and Mennonite congregations ===
In 2020, the Amish and Mennonite population of the county was 2,724, or 7.4% of the total population.

== Politics ==
Prior to 1912, Coshocton County was Democratic in presidential elections, only voting Republican twice from 1856 to 1908. The county was a bellwether from 1912 to 1936. Starting with the 1940 election, it has become a Republican stronghold county, with Lyndon B. Johnson in 1964 and Bill Clinton in 1992 being the two lone Democrats to win the county since then.

United States presidential election results for Coshocton County, Ohio
Year	Republican		Democratic		Third party(ies)	
Year	No.	%	No.	%	No.	%
1856	2,162	48.06%	2,281	50.70%	56	1.24%
1860	2,299	47.83%	2,288	47.60%	220	4.58%
1864	2,122	46.40%	2,451	53.60%	0	0.00%
1868	2,176	45.35%	2,622	54.65%	0	0.00%
1872	2,252	45.68%	2,656	53.87%	22	0.45%
1876	2,518	43.16%	3,312	56.77%	4	0.07%
1880	2,831	44.99%	3,440	54.67%	21	0.33%
1884	2,839	44.69%	3,469	54.60%	45	0.71%
1888	2,768	42.21%	3,567	54.39%	223	3.40%
1892	2,705	41.60%	3,529	54.27%	269	4.14%
1896	3,340	45.23%	3,979	53.89%	65	0.88%
1900	3,592	46.67%	3,940	51.20%	164	2.13%
1904	3,715	49.45%	3,545	47.18%	253	3.37%
1908	3,606	44.46%	4,106	50.62%	399	4.92%
1912	1,984	27.35%	3,465	47.77%	1,805	24.88%
1916	2,831	37.53%	4,269	56.60%	443	5.87%
1920	6,154	51.07%	5,617	46.61%	280	2.32%
1924	5,837	49.77%	4,415	37.64%	1,477	12.59%
1928	9,154	70.58%	3,745	28.87%	71	0.55%
1932	6,040	41.50%	8,188	56.26%	327	2.25%
1936	6,449	40.65%	9,316	58.72%	101	0.64%
1940	8,623	52.22%	7,889	47.78%	0	0.00%
1944	7,917	56.38%	6,126	43.62%	0	0.00%
1948	7,096	52.05%	6,457	47.36%	81	0.59%
1952	9,832	62.90%	5,799	37.10%	0	0.00%
1956	9,549	66.60%	4,789	33.40%	0	0.00%
1960	9,913	64.75%	5,396	35.25%	0	0.00%
1964	5,965	41.58%	8,382	58.42%	0	0.00%
1968	7,256	53.59%	5,013	37.03%	1,270	9.38%
1972	8,082	66.21%	3,790	31.05%	334	2.74%
1976	6,361	50.90%	5,827	46.63%	308	2.46%
1980	8,359	60.33%	4,725	34.10%	772	5.57%
1984	9,842	68.71%	4,392	30.66%	89	0.62%
1988	8,282	57.09%	6,020	41.50%	204	1.41%
1992	5,705	35.27%	6,212	38.41%	4,256	26.32%
1996	6,018	42.00%	6,005	41.91%	2,307	16.10%
2000	8,243	57.77%	5,594	39.21%	431	3.02%
2004	9,839	56.86%	7,378	42.64%	86	0.50%
2008	8,675	51.22%	7,689	45.39%	574	3.39%
2012	8,390	53.16%	6,940	43.97%	454	2.88%
2016	10,785	68.87%	4,013	25.63%	861	5.50%
2020	12,325	73.50%	4,125	24.60%	318	1.90%
2024	12,362	75.29%	3,835	23.36%	223	1.36%

United States Senate election results for Coshocton County, Ohio1
Year	Republican		Democratic		Third party(ies)	
Year	No.	%	No.	%	No.	%
2024	11,011	68.03%	4,457	27.54%	717	4.43%

== Government ==
The county courts meet in the courthouse located in Coshocton. Built in 1875, it is still in use today.

== Communities ==
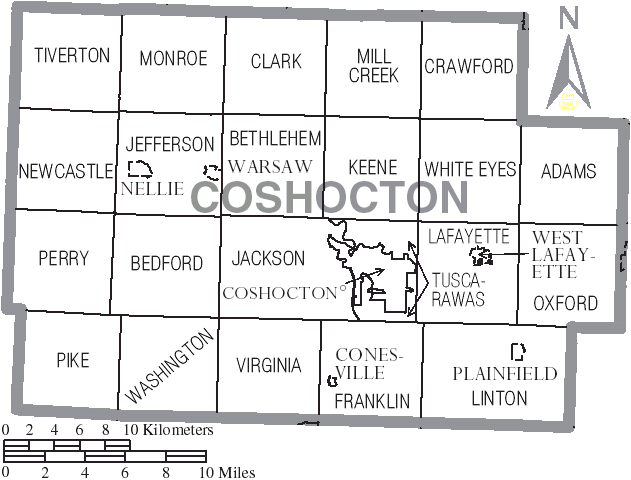
Map of Coshocton County, Ohio with municipal and township labels

=== City ===
- Coshocton (county seat)

=== Villages ===
- Conesville
- Nellie
- Plainfield
- Warsaw
- West Lafayette

=== Townships ===
- Adams
- Bedford
- Bethlehem
- Clark
- Crawford
- Franklin
- Jackson
- Jefferson
- Keene
- Lafayette
- Linton
- Mill Creek
- Monroe
- Newcastle
- Oxford
- Perry
- Pike
- Tiverton
- Tuscarawas
- Virginia
- Washington
- White Eyes

=== Census-designated places ===
- Canal Lewisville
- Fresno

=== Unincorporated communities ===
- Bacon
- Bakersville
- Blissfield
- Chili
- Hardscrabble
- Keene
- Layland
- New Bedford
- New Guilford
- New Moscow
- Newcastle
- Spring Mountain
- Tunnel Hill
- Wakatomika
- Walhonding
- West Bedford
- West Carlisle

== See also ==
- National Register of Historic Places listings in Coshocton County, Ohio
