= Warsaw, Ohio =

- Village
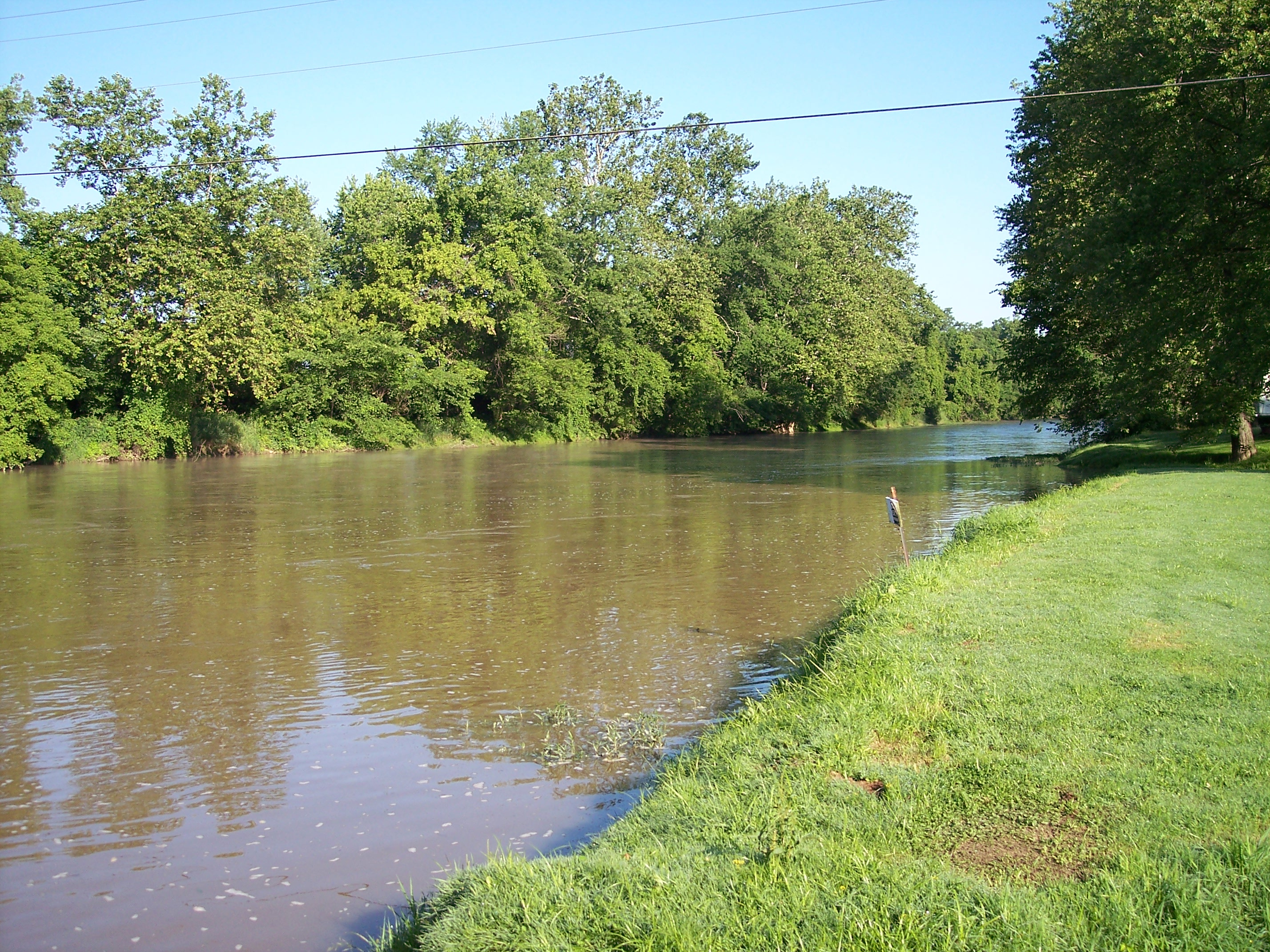
- The Walhonding River in Warsaw

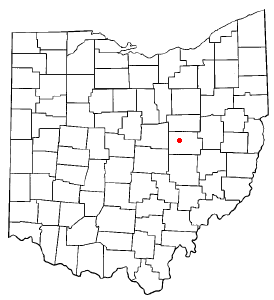
- Location of Warsaw, Ohio

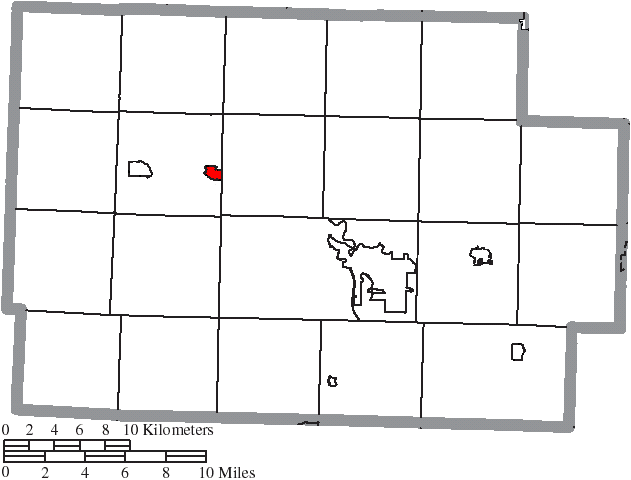
- Location of Warsaw in Coshocton County
- Coordinates: 40°20′06″N 81°59′57″W
- Country: United States
- State: Ohio
- County: Coshocton
- Township: Jefferson
- Established: 1834

Area
  - Total: 0.50 sq mi (1.30 km^{2})
  - Land: 0.49 sq mi (1.26 km^{2})
  - Water: 0.015 sq mi (0.04 km^{2})
- Elevation: 797 ft (243 m)

Population (2020)
  - Total: 634
  - Density: 1,303.4/sq mi (503.23/km^{2})
- Time zone: UTC−05:00 (Eastern (EST))
  - Summer (DST): UTC−04:00 (EDT)
- ZIP Code: 43844
- Area code: 740
- FIPS code: 39-81032
- GNIS feature ID: 2400096
- Website: https://warsawohio.us/

Warsaw is a village in Coshocton County, Ohio, United States, along the Walhonding River. The population was 624 at the 2020 census.

== History ==
Warsaw was laid out in 1834. It was named after Warsaw, the capital of Poland.

== Geography ==
According to the United States Census Bureau, the village has a total area of 0.46 square miles (1.19 km^{2}), of which 0.44 square miles (1.14 km^{2}) is land and 0.02 square miles (0.05 km^{2}) is water.

== Demographics ==
Historical population
Census	Pop.	Note	%±
1860	184		—
1880	277		—
1890	376		35.7%
1900	458		21.8%
1910	512		11.8%
1920	488		−4.7%
1930	386		−20.9%
1940	455		17.9%
1950	484		6.4%
1960	594		22.7%
1970	725		22.1%
1980	765		5.5%
1990	699		−8.6%
2000	781		11.7%
2010	682		−12.7%
2020	634		−7.0%
U.S. Decennial Census

=== 2010 census ===
As of the census of 2010, there were 682 people, 277 households, and 192 families living in the village. The population density was 1,550.0 inhabitants per square mile (598.5/km^{2}). There were 311 housing units at an average density of 706.8 per square mile (272.9/km^{2}). The racial makeup of the village was 98.8% White, 0.1% African American, 0.1% Native American, 0.3% Asian, and 0.6% from two or more races. Hispanic or Latino of any race were 0.7% of the population.

There were 277 households, of which 30.3% had children under the age of 18 living with them, 54.5% were married couples living together, 11.2% had a female householder with no husband present, 3.6% had a male householder with no wife present, and 30.7% were non-families. 26.4% of all households were made up of individuals, and 12.7% had someone living alone who was 65 years of age or older. The average household size was 2.46 and the average family size was 2.97.

The median age in the village was 40.5 years. 23.8% of residents were under the age of 18; 8% were between the ages of 18 and 24; 24.3% were from 25 to 44; 27.1% were from 45 to 64; and 16.7% were 65 years of age or older. The gender makeup of the village was 49.9% male and 50.1% female.

=== 2000 census ===
As of the census of 2000, there were 781 people, 308 households, and 218 families living in the village. The population density was 1,790.3 inhabitants per square mile (691.2/km^{2}). There were 346 housing units at an average density of 793.1 per square mile (306.2/km^{2}). The racial makeup of the village was 97.44% White, 1.15% African American, 0.64% Native American, and 0.77% from two or more races. Hispanic or Latino of any race were 0.77% of the population.

There were 308 households, out of which 37.3% had children under the age of 18 living with them, 54.2% were married couples living together, 12.7% had a female householder with no husband present, and 28.9% were non-families. 26.6% of all households were made up of individuals, and 14.9% had someone living alone who was 65 years of age or older. The average household size was 2.54 and the average family size was 3.02.

In the village, the population was spread out, with 29.2% under the age of 18, 8.2% from 18 to 24, 29.6% from 25 to 44, 18.8% from 45 to 64, and 14.2% who were 65 years of age or older. The median age was 35 years. For every 100 females there were 89.1 males. For every 100 females age 18 and over, there were 89.4 males.

The median income for a household in the village was $32,917, and the median income for a family was $40,556. Males had a median income of $30,417 versus $26,771 for females. The per capita income for the village was $14,443. About 3.7% of families and 6.7% of the population were below the poverty line, including 6.3% of those under age 18 and 12.2% of those age 65 or over.
