= Ohio State Route 621 =

State highway in Coshocton County, Ohio, US

State Route 621

Route information
- Maintained by ODOT
- Length: 5.98 mi (9.62 km)
- Existed: 1941–present

Major junctions
- South end: US 36 near Coshocton
- North end: CR 190 near Fresno

Location
- Country: United States
- State: Ohio
- Counties: Coshocton

Highway system
- Ohio State Highway System; Interstate; US; State; Scenic
← SR 619	→ SR 622

State Route 621 (SR 621) is a north–south state highway in the central part of the U.S. state of Ohio. The southern terminus of SR 621 is at U.S. Route 36 (US 36) approximately two and a half miles (4.0 km) northeast of Coshocton, and its northern terminus is adjacent to the North Appalachian Experimental Watershed Station, just north of its intersection with White Eyes Township Road 188, about 5 miles (8.0 km) northwest of the hamlet of Fresno. Continuing north after SR 621 ends is County Road 190 (CR 190).

Established in the early 1940s, SR 621 is a two-lane spur route whose primary purpose is to provide access to the North Appalachian Experimental Watershed Station from the state highway network. The entirety of the route exists within Coshocton County.

== Route description ==
Traffic volume on State Route 621
County Log Point	Volume
0.2	1,480
1.03	850
3.8	390
Volume: AADT; Source:

All of SR 621 is located within the confines of Coshocton County. This spur route is not included within the National Highway System.

SR 621 starts at an intersection with US 36 and CR 621 near the community of Canal Lewisville, with a sign saying "North Appalachian Experimental Watershed" along US 36. The route moves northeast uphill, with hills on left of the route, and fields on the right. SR 621 intersects CR 193 at a Y intersection, and continues moving north. A mile (1.6 km) later, SR 621 turns east and bends around a hill. After two miles, the road turns northeast for slightly more than one mile. There, SR 621 moves north for less than a mile, and ends at CR 190. The experimental watershed is located there.

== History ==
SR 621 was first designated in 1941. Its routing originally consisted of the present segment of US 36 between its northern junction with SR 83 north of Coshocton and the current southern terminus of SR 621, and then the entire current length of SR 621 up to the location of the North Appalachian Experimental Watershed Station. In 1962, US 36 was re-routed out of Coshocton and onto its current alignment that bypasses the city to the north, following the north side of the Tuscarawas River. Part of this re-routing resulted in the southern terminus of SR 621 being moved to its present location at US 36 northeast of Coshocton.

== Major intersections ==
The entire route is in Coshocton County.

Location	mi	km	Destinations	Notes
Keene Township	0.00	0.00	US 36 / CR 621 – Coshocton, Newcomerstown	Southern terminus
White Eyes Township	5.98	9.62	CR 190	Northern terminus at North Appalachian Experimental Watershed Station
1.000 mi = 1.609 km; 1.000 km = 0.621 mi
