= Smyser =

Smyser may refer to:

== People ==
- Martin L. Smyser (1851–1908), U.S. Representative from Ohio
- Melinda Smyser (born 1958), Idaho State Senator

== Other ==
- Smyser and English Pharmacy, historic pharmacy building in Germantown, Philadelphia
