= Ohio's 17th congressional district =

Defunct U.S. Congress electoral division

Coordinates: 41°11′N 80°59′W

- Obsolete district
- Created: 1830
- Eliminated: 2010
- Years active: 1813–2013

The 17th congressional district of Ohio is an obsolete congressional district last represented by Representative Tim Ryan.

This district became obsolete for the 113th Congress in 2013 as congressional district lines were redrawn to accommodate the loss of the seat as a result of the 2010 census. Most of the territory within the current 17th district has been merged into the Akron-based 13th district.

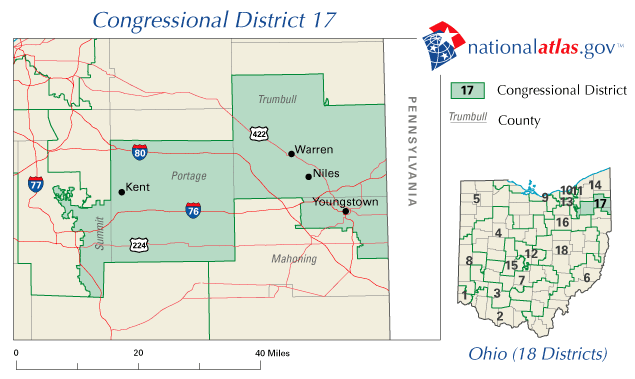
The district from 2003 to 2013

== List of members representing the district ==
Member	Party	Year(s)	Cong ress(es)	Electoral history
District established March 4, 1833
John Thomson (New Lisbon)	Jacksonian	March 4, 1833 – March 3, 1837	23rd 24th	Redistricted from the 12th district and re-elected in 1832. Re-elected in 1834. [data missing]
Andrew W. Loomis (New Lisbon)	Whig	March 4, 1837 – October 20, 1837	25th	Elected in 1836. Resigned.
Vacant		October 20, 1837 – December 20, 1837	25th	
Charles D. Coffin (New Lisbon)	Whig	December 20, 1837 – March 3, 1839	25th	Elected to finish Loomis's term [data missing]
John Hastings (Salem)	Democratic	March 4, 1839 – March 3, 1843	26th 27th	Elected in 1838. Re-elected in 1840. [data missing]
William C. McCauslen (Steubenville)	Democratic	March 4, 1843 – March 3, 1845	28th	Elected in 1843. [data missing]
George Fries (Hanoverton)	Democratic	March 4, 1845 – March 3, 1849	29th 30th	Elected in 1844. Re-elected in 1846. [data missing]
Joseph Cable (Carrollton)	Democratic	March 4, 1849 – March 3, 1853	31st 32nd	Elected in 1848. Re-elected in 1850. [data missing]
Wilson Shannon (St. Clairsville)	Democratic	March 4, 1853 – March 3, 1855	33rd	Elected in 1852. [data missing]
Charles J. Albright (Cambridge)	Anti-Nebraska	March 4, 1855 – March 3, 1857	34th	Elected in 1854. [data missing]
William Lawrence (Washington)	Democratic	March 4, 1857 – March 3, 1859	35th	Elected in 1856. [data missing]
Thomas Clarke Theaker (Bridgeport)	Republican	March 4, 1859 – March 3, 1861	36th	Elected in 1858. [data missing]
James R. Morris (Woodsfield)	Democratic	March 4, 1861 – March 3, 1863	37th	Elected in 1860. Redistricted to the 15th district.
Ephraim R. Eckley (Carrollton)	Republican	March 4, 1863 – March 3, 1869	38th 39th 40th	Elected in 1862. Re-elected in 1864. Re-elected in 1866. [data missing]
Jacob A. Ambler (Salem)	Republican	March 4, 1869 – March 3, 1873	41st 42nd	Elected in 1868. Re-elected in 1870. [data missing]
Laurin D. Woodworth (Youngstown)	Republican	March 4, 1873 – March 3, 1877	43rd 44th	Elected in 1872. Re-elected in 1874. [data missing]
William McKinley (Canton)	Republican	March 4, 1877 – March 3, 1879	45th	Elected in 1876. Redistricted to the 16th district.
James Monroe (Oberlin)	Republican	March 4, 1879 – March 3, 1881	46th	Redistricted from the 18th district and re-elected in 1878. [data missing]
William McKinley (Canton)	Republican	March 4, 1881 – March 3, 1883	47th	Redistricted from the 16th district and re-elected in 1880. [data missing]
Joseph D. Taylor (Cambridge)	Republican	March 4, 1883 – March 3, 1885	48th	Redistricted from the 16th district and re-elected in 1882. Lost re-election.
Adoniram J. Warner (Marietta)	Democratic	March 4, 1885 – March 3, 1887	49th	Redistricted from the 15th district and re-elected in 1884. [data missing]
Joseph D. Taylor (Cambridge)	Republican	March 4, 1887 – March 3, 1891	50th 51st	Elected in 1886. Re-elected in 1888. Redistricted to the 18th district.
Albert J. Pearson (Woodsfield)	Democratic	March 4, 1891 – March 3, 1893	52nd	Elected in 1890. Redistricted to the 16th district.
James A. D. Richards (New Philadelphia)	Democratic	March 4, 1893 – March 3, 1895	53rd	Elected in 1892. [data missing]
Addison S. McClure (Wooster)	Republican	March 4, 1895 – March 3, 1897	54th	Elected in 1894. [data missing]
John A. McDowell (Millersburg)	Democratic	March 4, 1897 – March 3, 1901	55th 56th	Elected in 1896. Re-elected in 1898. [data missing]
John W. Cassingham (Coshocton)	Democratic	March 4, 1901 – March 3, 1905	57th 58th	Elected in 1900. Re-elected in 1902. [data missing]
Martin L. Smyser (Wooster)	Republican	March 4, 1905 – March 3, 1907	59th	Elected in 1904. [data missing]
William A. Ashbrook (Johnstown)	Democratic	March 4, 1907 – March 3, 1921	60th 61st 62nd 63rd 64th 65th 66th	Elected in 1906. Re-elected in 1908. Re-elected in 1910. Re-elected in 1912. Re-elected in 1914. Re-elected in 1916. Re-elected in 1918. Lost re-election.
William M. Morgan (Newark)	Republican	March 4, 1921 – March 3, 1931	67th 68th 69th 70th 71st	Elected in 1920. Re-elected in 1922. Re-elected in 1924. Re-elected in 1926. Re-elected in 1928. Lost re-election.
Charles F. West (Granville)	Democratic	March 4, 1931 – January 3, 1935	72nd 73rd	Elected in 1930. Re-elected in 1932. Retired to run for U.S. Senator.
William A. Ashbrook (Johnstown)	Democratic	January 3, 1935 – January 1, 1940	74th 75th 76th	Elected in 1934. Re-elected in 1936. Re-elected in 1938. Died.
Vacant		January 1, 1940 – February 27, 1940	76th	
J. Harry McGregor (West Lafayette)	Republican	February 27, 1940 – October 7, 1958	76th 77th 78th 79th 80th 81st 82nd 83rd 84th 85th	Elected to finish Ashbrook's term. Re-elected in 1940. Re-elected in 1942. Re-elected in 1944. Re-elected in 1946. Re-elected in 1948. Re-elected in 1950. Re-elected in 1952. Re-elected in 1954. Re-elected in 1956. Died.
Vacant		October 7, 1958 – January 3, 1959	85th	
Robert W. Levering (Fredericktown)	Democratic	January 3, 1959 – January 3, 1961	86th	Elected in 1958. Lost re-election.
John M. Ashbrook (Johnstown)	Republican	January 3, 1961 – April 24, 1982	87th 88th 89th 90th 91st 92nd 93rd 94th 95th 96th 97th	Elected in 1960. Re-elected in 1962. Re-elected in 1964. Re-elected in 1966. Re-elected in 1968. Re-elected in 1970. Re-elected in 1972. Re-elected in 1974. Re-elected in 1976. Re-elected in 1978. Re-elected in 1980. Died.
Vacant		April 24, 1982 – June 29, 1982	97th	
Jean Spencer Ashbrook (Johnstown)	Republican	June 29, 1982 – January 3, 1983	97th	Elected to finish her husband's term. Retired.
Lyle Williams (Warren)	Republican	January 3, 1983 – January 3, 1985	98th	Redistricted from the 19th district and re-elected in 1982. Lost re-election.
Jim Traficant (Poland)	Democratic	January 3, 1985 – July 24, 2002	99th 100th 101st 102nd 103rd 104th 105th 106th 107th	Elected in 1984. Re-elected in 1986. Re-elected in 1988. Re-elected in 1990. Re-elected in 1992. Re-elected in 1994. Re-elected in 1996. Re-elected in 1998. Re-elected in 2000. Expelled.
Vacant		July 24, 2002 – January 3, 2003	107th	
Tim Ryan (Niles)	Democratic	January 3, 2003 – January 3, 2013	108th 109th 110th 111th 112th	Elected in 2002. Re-elected in 2004. Re-elected in 2006. Re-elected in 2008. Re-elected in 2010. Redistricted to the 13th district.
District dissolved January 3, 2013

== Recent election results ==
The following chart shows recent election results. Bold type indicates victor. Italic type indicates incumbent.

Year	Democratic	Republican	Other
1920	William A. Ashbrook (inc.): 46,675	√ William M. Morgan: 46,968	(none)
1922	William A. Ashbrook: 41,745	**√ William M. Morgan** (inc.): 42,331	(none)
1924	J. Freer Bittinger: 36,532	**√ William M. Morgan** (inc.): 50,226	(none)
1926	J. Freer Bittinger: 29,674	**√ William M. Morgan** (inc.): 36,249	(none)
1928	Charles F. West: 40,846	**√ William M. Morgan** (inc.): 56,823	(none)
1930	√ Charles F. West: 45,633	William M. Morgan (inc.): 43,197	(none)
1932	**√ Charles F. West** (inc.): 55,296	William M. Morgan: 51,601	(none)
1934	√ William A. Ashbrook: 49,211	James A. Glenn: 41,954	(none)
1936	**√ William A. Ashbrook** (inc.): 69,446	James A. Glenn: 48,270	William Edward Lyle: 2,618
1938	**√ William A. Ashbrook** (inc.): 51,305	Walter B. Woodward: 46,300	(none)
1940	Ralph C. Lutz: 56,343	**√ J. Harry McGregor** (inc.): 69,102	(none)
1942	Samuel A. Anderson: 28,235	**√ J. Harry McGregor** (inc.): 47,565	(none)
1944	Thomas A. Wilson: 43,271	**√ J. Harry McGregor** (inc.): 73,206	(none)
1946	Wesley W. Purdy: 30,406	**√ J. Harry McGregor** (inc.): 57,167	(none)
1948	Robert W. Levering: 53,651	**√ J. Harry McGregor** (inc.): 60,234	(none)
1950	Robert W. Levering: 39,726	**√ J. Harry McGregor** (inc.): 71,382	(none)
1952	James J. Mayor: 44,117	**√ J. Harry McGregor** (inc.): 94,624	(none)
1954	Robert W. Levering: 34,638	**√ J. Harry McGregor** (inc.): 63,301	(none)
1956	Robert W. Levering: 44,806	**√ J. Harry McGregor** (inc.): 88,931	(none)
1958	√ Robert W. Levering: 63,650	Laurence Burns: 59,490	(none)
1960	Robert W. Levering (inc.): 70,470	√ John M. Ashbrook: 79,609	(none)
1962	Robert W. Levering: 49,415	**√ John M. Ashbrook** (inc.): 69,976	(none)
1964	Robert W. Levering: 71,291	**√ John M. Ashbrook** (inc.): 75,674	(none)
1966	Robert T. Secrest: 59,031	**√ John M. Ashbrook** (inc.): 73,132	(none)
1968	Robert W. Levering: 54,127	**√ John M. Ashbrook** (inc.): 100,148	(none)
1970	James C. Hood: 44,066	**√ John M. Ashbrook** (inc.): 79,472	Clifford J. Simpson (AI): 4,253
1972	Raymond C. Beck: 62,512	**√ John M. Ashbrook** (inc.): 92,666	Clifford J. Simpson (AI): 6,376
1974	David D. Noble: 63,342	**√ John M. Ashbrook** (inc.): 70,708	Clifford J. Simpson: 3
1976	John C. McDonald: 72,168	**√ John M. Ashbrook** (inc.): 94,874	(none)
1978	Kenneth Robert Grier: 42,117	**√ John M. Ashbrook** (inc.): 87,010	(none)
1980	Donald E. Yunker: 47,900	**√ John M. Ashbrook** (inc.): 128,870	(none)
1982	George D. Tablack: 80,375	√ Lyle Williams: 98,476	(none)
1984	√ Jim Traficant: 123,014	Lyle Williams (inc.): 105,449	Other: 2,198
1986	**√ Jim Traficant** (inc.): 112,855	James H. Fulks: 43,334	(none)
1988	**√ Jim Traficant** (inc.): 162,526	Frederick W. Lenz: 47,929	(none)
1990	**√ Jim Traficant** (inc.): 133,207	Robert R. DeJulio Jr.: 38,199	(none)
1992	**√ Jim Traficant** (inc.): 216,503	Salvatore Pansino: 40,745	(none)
1994	**√ Jim Traficant** (inc.): 149,004	Mike G. Meister: 43,490	(none)
1996	**√ Jim Traficant** (inc.): 218,283	(none)	James M. Cahaney (N): 21,685
1998	**√ Jim Traficant** (inc.): 123,718	Paul H. Alberty: 57,703	(none)
2000	**√ Jim Traficant** (inc.): 120,333	Paul H. Alberty: 54,751	Randy D. Walter: 51,793; Lou D'Apolito: 9,568; Milton R. Norris (L): 1,278; Carol Ann McCoy (N): 3,154
2002	√ Tim Ryan: 94,441 (Redistricted from the 14th district)	Ann Womer Benjamin: 62,188	Jim Traficant 28,045
2004	**√ Tim Ryan** (inc.): 208,331	Frank V. Cusimano: 61,727	Randy Walter
2006	**√ Tim Ryan** (inc.): 166,279	Don Manning II: 41,004	(none)
2008	**√ Tim Ryan** (inc.): 204,028	Duane Grassell: 56,003	(none)
2010	**√ Tim Ryan** (inc.): 100,295	Jim Graham: 56,441	Jim Traficant: 29,969
