= 1992 United States House of Representatives elections in Ohio =

- November 3, 1992

All 19 Ohio seats to the United States House of Representatives
	Majority party	Minority party
Party	Democratic	Republican
Last election	11	10
Seats won	10	9
Seat change	▼1	▼1
Popular vote	2,495,029	2,254,648
Percentage	50.14%	45.34
- Results: Democratic hold Democratic gain Republican hold Republican gain

The 1992 United States House of Representatives elections in Ohio were held on November 3, 1992, and determined who would represent the state of Ohio in the United States House of Representatives. The primary elections were held on June 2, 1992.

Following the 1990 United States Census, Ohio lost two congressional seats, reducing it from 21 seats to 19. Representatives are elected for two-year terms; those elected in November 1992 served in the 103rd Congress from January 3, 1993, until January 3, 1995. The election coincided with the 1992 United States presidential election.

Both parties lost one seat following the redistricting from the 1990 Census.

== Overview ==
1992 United States House of Representatives elections in Ohio
Party	Votes	%	Before	After	+/–
Democratic	2,495,029	50.14%	11	10	-1
Republican	2,254,648	45.34%	10	9	-1
Independent	224,183	4.51%	0	0	0
Write-ins	592	0.01%	0	0	0
Totals	4,974,452	100.00%	21	19	-2

== Results ==
Final results from the Federal Election Commission.

=== District 1 ===
Ohio's 1st congressional district 1992 election results
Party	Candidate	Votes	%
Democratic	David S. Mann	120,190	51.27
Independent	Steve Grote	101,498	43.30
Independent	James A. Berns	12,734	5.43
No party	Dennis L. Mayberry (write-in)	6	0.00
No party	Brian Ali Taylor (write-in)	5	0.00
Total votes		234,433	100.00
Democratic hold			

=== District 2 ===
Ohio's 2nd congressional district 1992 election results
Party	Candidate	Votes	%
Republican	Bill Gradison	177,720	70.06
Democratic	Thomas R. Chandler	75,924	29.93
No party	Emily Roughen Wood (write-in)	7	0.00
Total votes		253,651	100.00
Republican hold			

=== District 3 ===
Ohio's 3rd congressional district 1992 election results
Party	Candidate	Votes	%
Democratic	Tony P. Hall	146,072	59.67
Republican	Peter W. Davis	98,733	40.33
No party	Ira T. McDonald (write-in)	6	0.00
Total votes		244,811	100.00
Democratic hold			

=== District 4 ===
Ohio's 4th congressional district 1992 election results
Party	Candidate	Votes	%
Republican	Mike Oxley	147,346	61.28
Democratic	Raymond M. Ball	92,608	38.52
No party	James R. Stahl (write-in)	486	0.20
Total votes		240,440	100.00
Republican hold			

=== District 5 ===
Ohio's 5th congressional district 1992 election results
Party	Candidate	Votes	%
Republican	Paul Gillmor	187,860	100.00
Total votes		187,860	100.00
Republican hold			

=== District 6 ===
Ohio's 6th congressional district 1992 election results
Party	Candidate	Votes	%
Democratic	Ted Strickland	122,720	50.72
Republican	Bob McEwen	119,252	49.28
Total votes		241,972	100.00
Democratic gain from Republican			

=== District 7 ===
Ohio's 7th congressional district 1992 election results
Party	Candidate	Votes	%
Republican	Dave Hobson	164,195	71.26
Democratic	Clifford S. Heskett	66,237	28.74
Total votes		230,432	100.00
Republican hold			

=== District 8 ===
Ohio's 8th congressional district 1992 election results
Party	Candidate	Votes	%
Republican	John Boehner	176,362	73.98
Democratic	Fred Sennet	62,033	26.02
Total votes		238,395	100.00
Republican hold			

=== District 9 ===
Ohio's 9th congressional district 1992 election results
Party	Candidate	Votes	%
Democratic	Marcy Kaptur	178,879	73.58
Republican	Ken D. Brown	53,011	21.81
Independent	Ed Howard	11,162	4.59
No party	Mary Ann Haupricht (write-in)	50	.02
Total votes		243,102	100.00
Democratic hold			

=== District 10 ===
Ohio's 10th congressional district 1992 election results
Party	Candidate	Votes	%
Republican	Martin Hoke	136,433	56.79
Democratic	Mary Rose Oakar	103,788	43.20
No party	Peter A. Thierjung (write-in)	12	.00
No party	Guy Templeton Black (write-in)	6	.00
No party	David Lee Rock (write-in)	0	.00
Total votes		240,239	100.00
Republican gain from Democratic			

=== District 11 ===
Ohio's 11th congressional district 1992 election results
Party	Candidate	Votes	%
Democratic	Louis Stokes	154,718	69.19
Republican	Beryl E. Rothschild	43,866	19.62
Independent	Edmund Gudenas	19,733	8.84
Independent	Gerald C. Henley	5,267	2.35
No party	Ronald G. Parks (write-in)	0	.00
Total votes		223,624	100.00
Democratic hold			

=== District 12 ===
Ohio's 12th congressional district 1992 election results
Party	Candidate	Votes	%
Republican	John Kasich	170,297	71.24
Democratic	Bob Fitrakis	68,761	28.76
Total votes		239,058	100.00
Republican hold			

=== District 13 ===
Ohio's 13th congressional district 1992 election results
Party	Candidate	Votes	%
Democratic	Sherrod Brown	134,486	53.31
Republican	Margaret R. Mueller	88,889	35.24
Independent	Mark Miller	20,320	8.06
Independent	Tom Lawson	4,719	1.87
Independent	Werner J. Lange	3,844	1.52
Total votes		252,258	100.00
Democratic hold			

=== District 14 ===
Ohio's 14th congressional district 1992 election results
Party	Candidate	Votes	%
Democratic	Tom Sawyer	165,335	67.76
Republican	Robert Morgan	78,659	32.24
Total votes		243,994	100.00
Democratic hold			

=== District 15 ===
Ohio's 15th congressional district 1992 election results
Party	Candidate	Votes	%
Republican	Deborah Pryce	110,390	44.12
Democratic	Richard Cordray	94,907	37.93
Independent	Linda S. Reidelbach	44,906	17.95
No party	Larry W. Oliver (write-in)	2	.00
Total votes		250,205	100.00
Republican hold			

=== District 16 ===
Ohio's 16th congressional district 1992 election results
Party	Candidate	Votes	%
Republican	Ralph Regula	158,489	63.72
Democratic	Warner D. Mendenhall	90,224	36.28
Total votes		248,713	100.00
Republican hold			

=== District 17 ===
Ohio's 17th congressional district 1992 election results
Party	Candidate	Votes	%
Democratic	James Traficant	216,503	84.16
Republican	Salvatore Pansino	40,743	15.84
Total votes		257,246	100.00
Democratic hold			

=== District 18 ===
Ohio's 18th congressional district 1992 election results
Party	Candidate	Votes	%
Democratic	Douglas Applegate	166,189	68.27
Republican	Bill Ress	77,229	31.73
Total votes		243,418	100.00
Democratic hold			

=== District 19 ===
Ohio's 19th congressional district 1992 election results
Party	Candidate	Votes	%
Democratic	Eric Fingerhut	138,465	52.63
Republican	Robert A. Gardner	124,606	47.36
No party	Allan D. Mononen (write-in)	7	.00
No party	Don Mackle (write-in)	5	.00
Total votes		263,083	100.00
Democratic hold			

== See also ==
- 103rd United States Congress
- Political party strength in Ohio
- Political party strength in U.S. states
- 1992 United States House of Representatives elections
