= Lafayette Township, Ohio =

Lafayette Township, Ohio, may refer to:

- Lafayette Township, Coshocton County, Ohio
- Lafayette Township, Medina County, Ohio
