= Tuscarawas Township, Ohio =

Tuscarawas Township, Ohio may refer to:

- Tuscarawas Township, Coshocton County, Ohio
- Tuscarawas Township, Stark County, Ohio
