= Tuscarawas =

Tuscarawas may refer to:

- Tuscarawas, Ohio
- Tuscarawas County, Ohio
- Tuscarawas Township, Coshocton County, Ohio
- Tuscarawas Township, Stark County, Ohio
- Tuscarawas River
