= Fresno, Ohio =

- Census-designated place
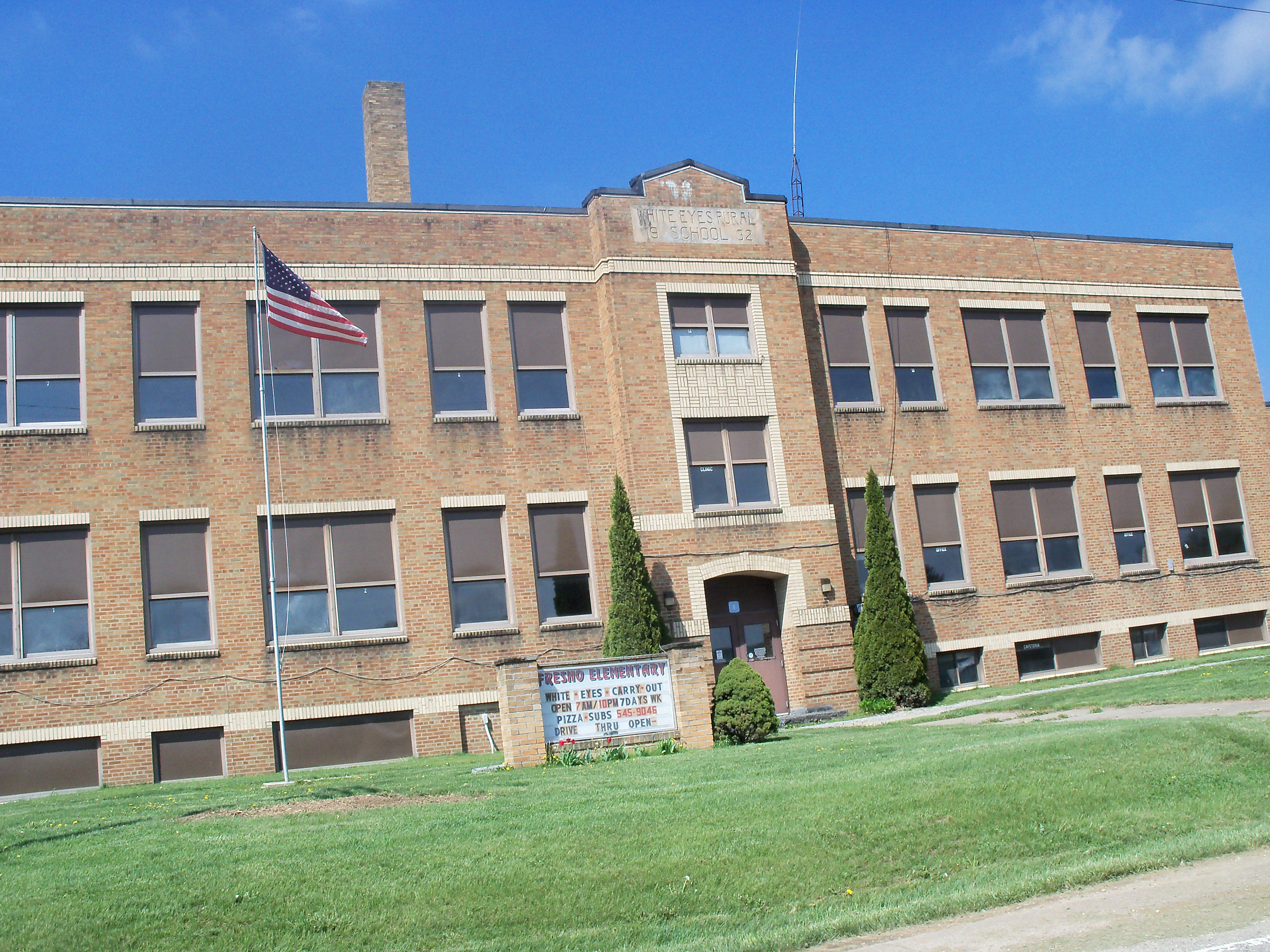
- The former Fresno Elementary School

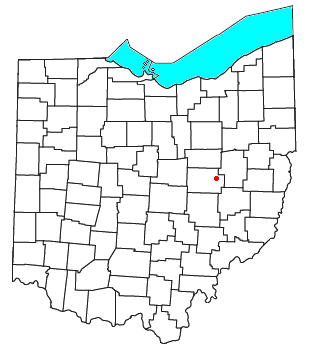
- Location of Fresno, Ohio
- Coordinates: 40°19′51″N 81°44′19″W
- Country: United States
- State: Ohio
- County: Coshocton
- Townships: White Eyes
- Elevation: 807 ft (246 m)

Population (2020)
  - Total: 140
- Time zone: UTC-5 (Eastern (EST))
  - Summer (DST): UTC-4 (EDT)
- ZIP: 43824
- Area code: 740
- GNIS feature ID: 2628893

Fresno is an unincorporated community and census-designated place in eastern White Eyes Township, Coshocton County, Ohio, United States. As of the 2020 census it had a population of 140. It has a post office with the ZIP code 43824. It lies along State Route 93 between West Lafayette and Baltic.

== History ==
Fresno was originally called Jacktown. The residents apparently didn't like the name Jacktown, and the community was renamed Avondale by popular vote. A post office was established under the name Avondale in 1875, and the name of the post office was changed to Fresno in 1905.

== Notable person ==
World-class runner Brian Olinger grew up in Fresno and attended Ridgewood High School.
