= Pansino =

Pansino is an Italian surname. Notable people with the surname include:

- Rosanna Pansino (born 1985), American baker, actress, and YouTube personality
- Salvatore Pansino (born 1934), American electrical engineer
