= Brian Olinger =

American runner (born 1983)

Brian Olinger (born June 2, 1983) is a professional runner. He was sponsored by Reebok and specialized in the 3000 meter steeplechase with a personal record of 8:19.56. He competed in the trials for the U.S. team in the 2007 World Championship.

== Early life ==
Brian Olinger was born on June 2, 1983, in Fresno, Ohio, where he was raised. He attended Ridgewood High School (West Lafayette, Ohio) in West Lafayette, Ohio. He is a state champion in the division 3 cross country 5K with a PR of 15:30 and a state champion in the 3200 in track with a PR of 9:26. He has a 1600 PR of 4:21.

=== College ===
Brian Olinger walked onto the Ohio State cross country team his freshman year. His sophomore year he received a full scholarship. The highlights of his College Career include being the 2004 Big Ten 5k champion. He currently holds records at Ohio State University. He graduated with a degree in Human Ecology and Early Childhood Development. His coach at OSU was two time Olympic Steeplechaser Robert Gary.

== Professional career ==
He moved to Columbus, Ohio, and in 2008 he made it to Olympic Trials final in 2008 but missed making the Olympic team by two places. He currently holds a PR in the mile of 4:00 and a 5k PR of 13:31. He is currently sponsored by Reebok and is still coached by Robert Gary. He has a brother, Christopher Olinger who recently ran track and Cross Country for OSU. Brian Olinger placed 6th at the USATF 2011 12k Men's cross country, earning him a spot on the 2011 USATF cross country team to compete at the IAAF World Cross Country Championships.

== Personal records ==
Personal Bests-Indoor

- One mile-4:00.62 Bloomington, Indiana 29/01/2010
- 3,000-7:51.13 Boston, MA 7/02/2009
- 5,000-13:45 Seattle, Washington 02/2006

Personal Bests- Outdoor

- 3,000 Steeplechas-8:19.29 Heusden-Zolder 28/07/2007
- 3,000-7:55.26 Carson, CA 20/05/2007
- 5,000-13:31.21 Walnut, CA 18/04/2008
- 10,000-28:07 Walnut, CA 05/2011

== Competition record ==
- 2000 Ohio State Division III State Cross Country Champ
- 2001 Ohio State Division III State Champion in the 3200
- 2004 Big Ten Outdoor 5,000 Meter Champ
- 2005 4th-place finish at USA Outdoor Championships
- 2008 6th-place finish at the USA Olympic Trials
- 2011 6th-place finish at the United States cross Country trials earning him a spot on the U.S. team to the world cross country

championships in Spain, where he finished 76th.
