= William M. Morgan (Ohio politician) =

American politician

William Mitchell Morgan
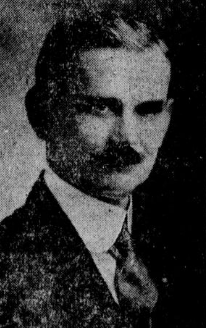

Member of the U.S. House of Representatives from Ohio's 17th district
- In office March 4, 1921 – March 3, 1931
- Preceded by: William A. Ashbrook
- Succeeded by: Charles F. West

Personal details
- Born: August 1, 1870 Brownsville, Ohio, U.S.
- Died: September 17, 1935 (aged 65) Columbus, Ohio, U.S.
- Resting place: Cedar Hill Cemetery, Newark, Ohio
- Party: Republican

William Mitchell Morgan (August 1, 1870 – September 17, 1935) was an American politician who served five terms as a U.S. representative from Ohio from 1921 to 1931.

== Early life and career ==
Born in Brownsville, Ohio, Morgan attended the public schools. He pursued various occupations until 1898, when he moved to Newark, Ohio. He was employed as a laborer and later as a musician. He studied literature and science. He engaged in agriculture, merchandising, and the wool-buying business. He was active in organized labor movements, serving as president of the Newark (Ohio) Musicians' Union.

== Congress ==
Morgan was elected as a Republican to the Sixty-seventh and to the four succeeding Congresses (March 4, 1921 – March 3, 1931). He was an unsuccessful candidate for reelection in 1930 to the Seventy-second Congress and for election in 1932 to the Seventy-third Congress.

== Later career and death ==
He resumed his former business pursuits. He served as president of the Ohio State Federation of Labor in 1935, resigning the same year to become a member of the state industrial commission, in which he served until his death in Columbus, Ohio, on September 17, 1935. He was interred in Cedar Hill Cemetery, Newark, Ohio.

== Sources ==
- United States Congress. "William M. Morgan (id: M000959)". Biographical Directory of the United States Congress.

U.S. House of Representatives
Preceded by William A. Ashbrook	Member of the U.S. House of Representatives from Ohio's 17th congressional district 1921-1931	Succeeded by Charles F. West
