= 1934 United States Senate election in Ohio =

- November 6, 1934
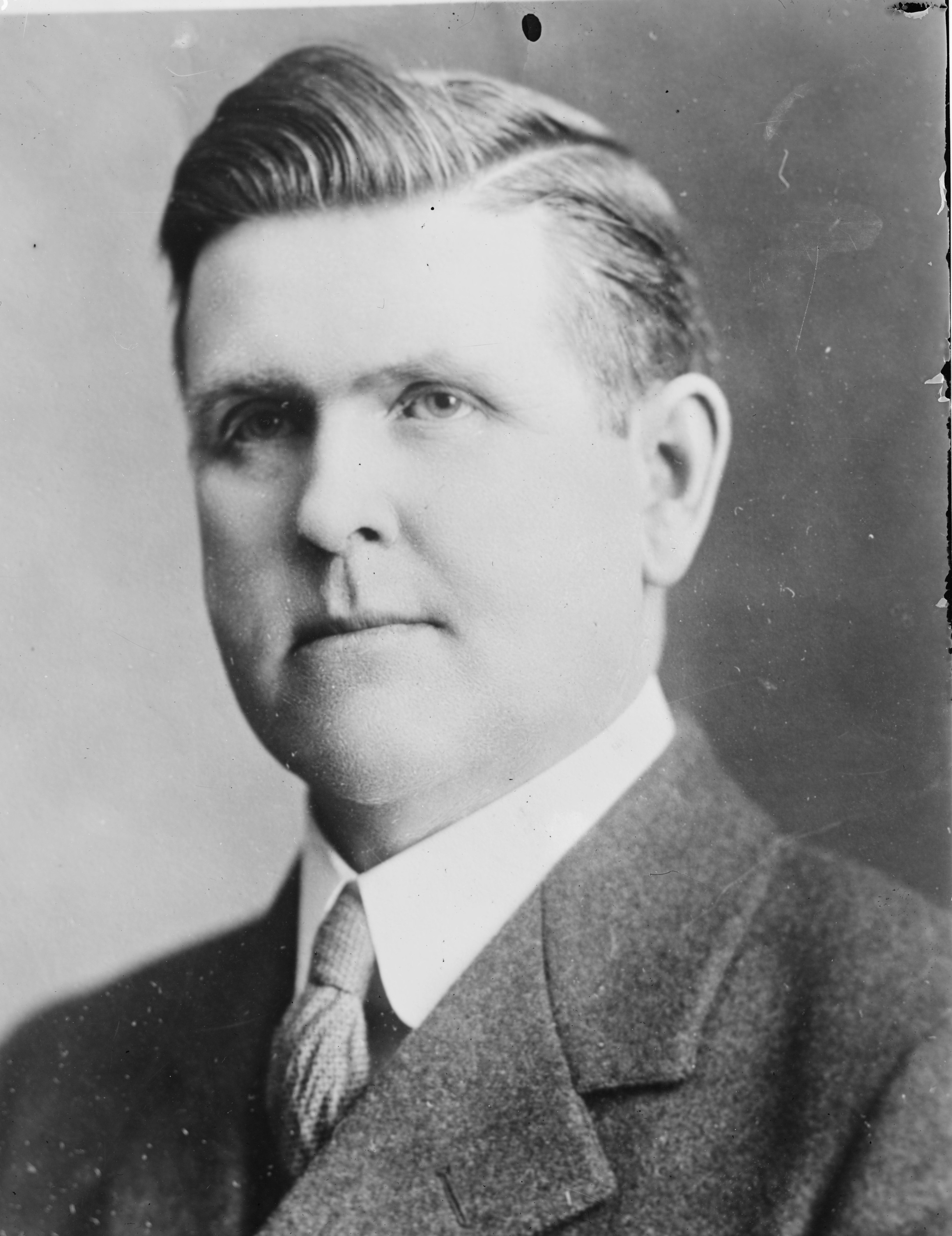

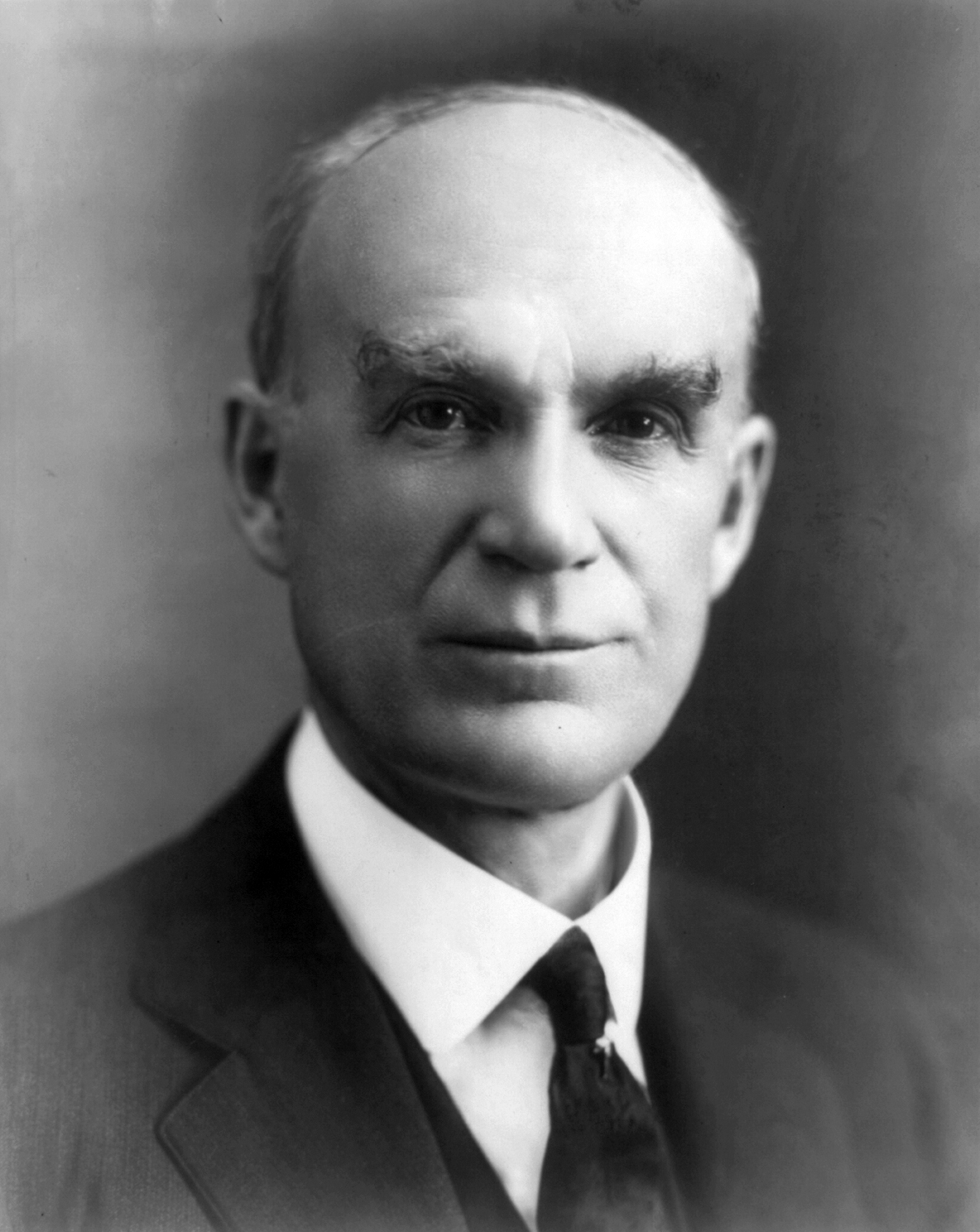
Nominee	Vic Donahey	Simeon Fess
Party	Democratic	Republican
Popular vote	1,276,206	839,068
Percentage	59.95%	39.41%
U.S. senator before election
Simeon Fess
Republican
Elected U.S. Senator
Vic Donahey
Democratic

The 1934 United States Senate election in Ohio took place on November 6, 1934. Incumbent Republican Senator Simeon Fess ran for a third term in office, but was defeated by Democratic former Governor of Ohio Vic Donahey in a landslide.

== Democratic primary ==
=== Candidates ===
- A. Victor Donahey, former Governor of Ohio (1923–1929)
- Charles F. West, U.S. Representative from Granville
- George White, incumbent Governor of Ohio

=== Results ===
1934 Democratic Senate primary
Party	Candidate	Votes	%
Democratic	A. Victor Donahey	263,398	43.94%
Democratic	Charles F. West	168,120	28.05%
Democratic	George White	167,939	28.02%
Total votes		599,457	100.00%

== General election ==
=== Results ===
1934 U.S. Senate election in Ohio
Party	Candidate	Votes	%	±%
Democratic	A. Victor Donahey	1,276,206	59.95%	▲20.88
Republican	Simeon Fess (incumbent)	839,068	39.41%	▼21.32
Communist	William C. Sandberg	13,546	0.64%	▲0.55
Write-in		23	0.00%	N/A
Total votes		2,128,820	100.00%	
Democratic gain from Republican				

== See also ==
- 1934 United States Senate elections
