= J. Harry McGregor =

American politician (1896–1958)

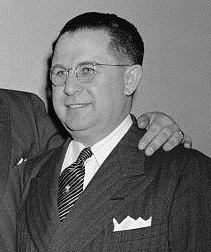
- March 5, 1940, Washington, D.C.

Member of the U.S. House of Representatives from Ohio's 17th district
- In office February 27, 1940 – October 7, 1958
- Preceded by: William A. Ashbrook
- Succeeded by: Robert W. Levering

Member of the Ohio House of Representatives
- In office 1935-1940

Personal details
- Born: James Harry McGregor; September 30, 1896 Unionport, Ohio, U.S.
- Died: October 7, 1958 (aged 62) Coshocton, Ohio, U.S.
- Resting place: Fairfield Cemetery, West Lafayette, Ohio
- Party: Republican
- Education: Oberlin College

James Harry McGregor (September 30, 1896 – October 7, 1958) was an American World War I veteran who served nine terms as a Republican member of the U.S. House of Representatives from Ohio from 1940 to 1958.

== Biography ==
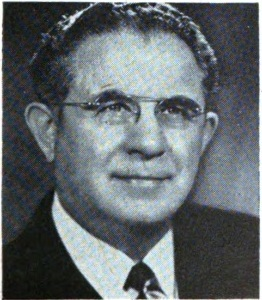
James Harry MacGregor

James Harry McGregor was born on a farm near Unionport, Jefferson County, Ohio. He attended the public schools, West Lafayette College, and Oberlin College.

=== World War I ===
During the First World War, he served as a sergeant with the One Hundred and Seventy-sixth Field Artillery, United States Army, in 1917 and 1918.

=== Political career ===
He was engaged in the lumber and general contracting business at West Lafayette, Ohio, 1918–1945. He was a member of the school board of West Lafayette, Ohio, for eight years. He was a member of the Ohio House of Representatives from 1935 to 1940, serving as minority whip from 1937 to 1939 and as majority leader and speaker pro tempore in 1939 and 1940.

McGregor was elected as a Republican to the Seventy-sixth Congress to fill the vacancy caused by the death of William A. Ashbrook. He was reelected to the Seventy-seventh and to the eight succeeding Congresses and served until his death. He served as chairman of the Special Committee on Chamber Improvements during the Eightieth and Eighty-third Congresses. He had been renominated to the Eighty-sixth Congress.

=== Death ===
He died in Coshocton, Ohio, in 1958 at the age of 62, and was interred at Fairfield Cemetery in West Lafayette, Ohio. McGregor voted in favor of the Civil Rights Act of 1957.

== See also ==
- List of members of the United States Congress who died in office (1950–1999)

== Sources ==
- United States Congress. "J. Harry McGregor (id: M000460)". Biographical Directory of the United States Congress.
- The Political Graveyard

U.S. House of Representatives
Preceded by William A. Ashbrook	Member of the U.S. House of Representatives from Ohio's 17th congressional district 1940-1958	Succeeded by Robert W. Levering
