= William A. Ashbrook =

American politician and businessman

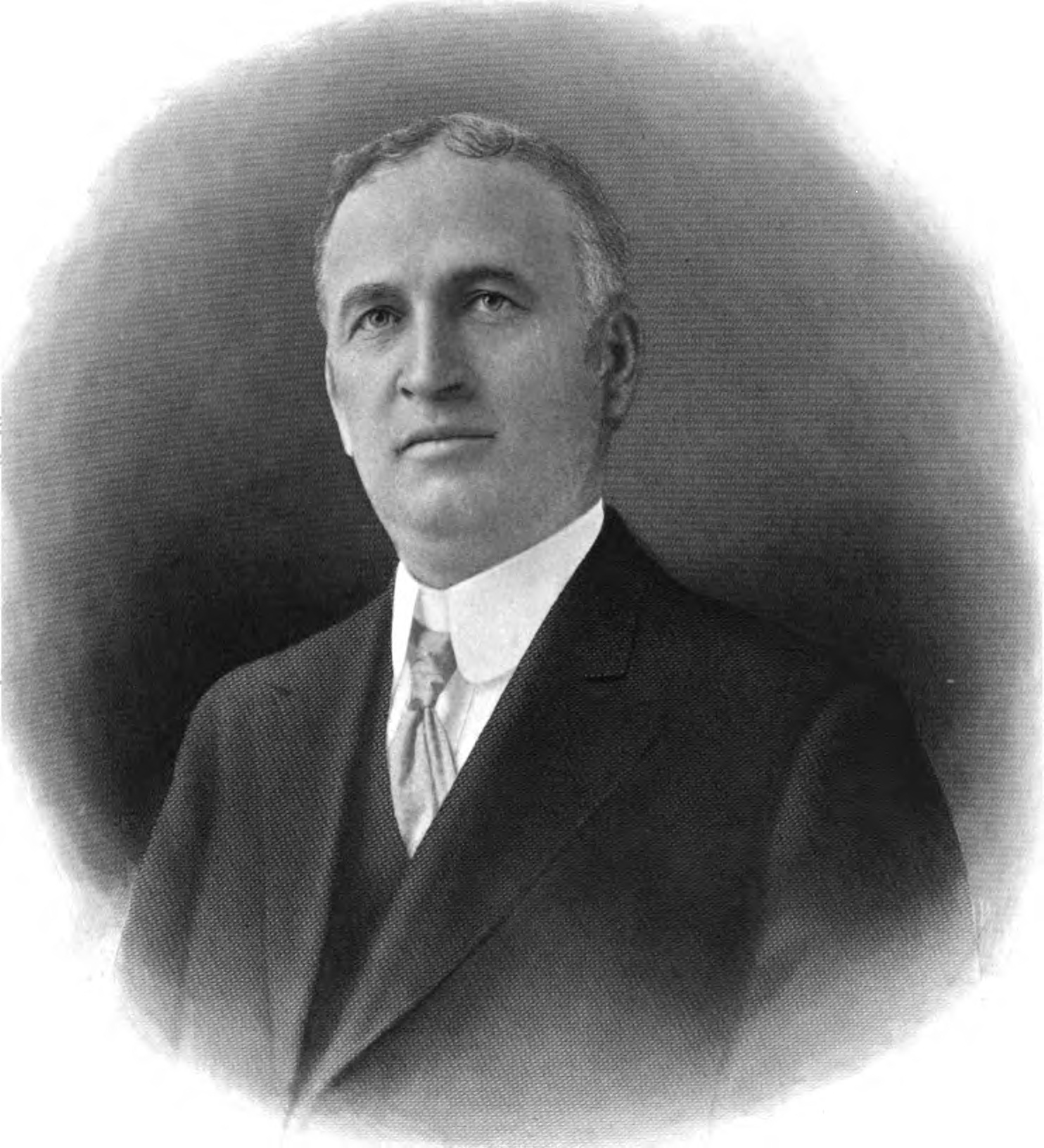

Member of the U.S. House of Representatives from Ohio's 17th district
- In office March 4, 1907 – March 3, 1921
- Preceded by: Martin L. Smyser
- Succeeded by: William M. Morgan
- In office January 3, 1935 – January 1, 1940
- Preceded by: Charles F. West
- Succeeded by: J. Harry McGregor

Member of the Ohio House of Representatives from the Licking County district
- In office January 1, 1906 – March 3, 1907
- Preceded by: Charles D. Watkins
- Succeeded by: Robert W. Howard

Personal details
- Born: William Albert Ashbrook; July 1, 1867 Johnstown, Ohio, U.S.
- Died: January 1, 1940 (aged 72) Washington, D.C., U.S.
- Resting place: Green Hill Cemetery, Johnstown
- Party: Democratic
- Children: John M. Ashbrook
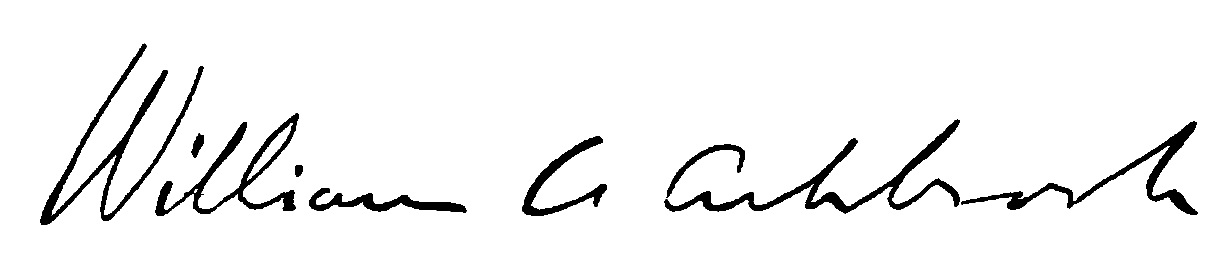
- Signature

William Albert Ashbrook (July 1, 1867 – January 1, 1940) was an American businessman, newspaper publisher, and Democratic politician from Ohio.

== Political career ==
He entered politics as a Democrat and won a seat to the Ohio House of Representatives in 1904. In 1906 he was elected to the U.S. House, where he served until he was defeated in the 1920 elections. Returning home, he resumed his newspaper publishing and banking career in Johnstown. He married Marie Swank and they had a son, John M. Ashbrook, in 1928. He ran in a successful comeback campaign for Congress in 1934, and served there until his death.

== See also ==
- List of members of the United States Congress who died in office (1900–1949)

U.S. House of Representatives
Preceded by Martin L. Smyser	Member of the U.S. House of Representatives from Ohio's 17th congressional district 1907–1921	Succeeded by William M. Morgan
Preceded by Charles F. West	Member of the U.S. House of Representatives from Ohio's 17th congressional district 1935–1940	Succeeded by J. Harry McGregor
