= George W. Crouse =

American politician

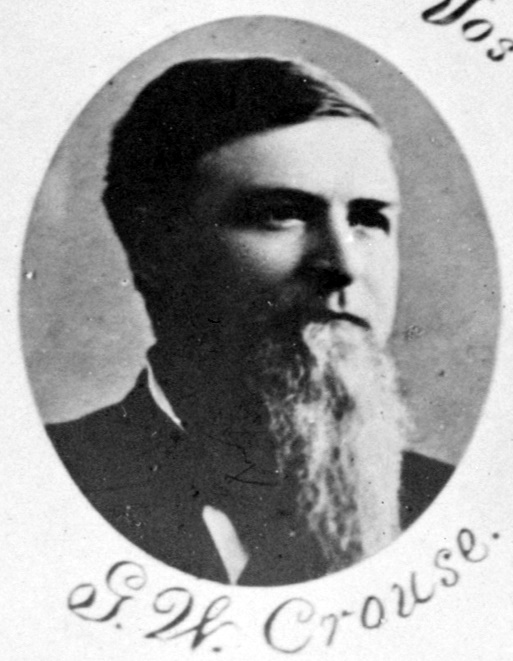

Member of the U.S. House of Representatives from Ohio's 20th district
- In office March 4, 1887 – March 3, 1889
- Preceded by: William McKinley
- Succeeded by: Martin L. Smyser

Member of the Ohio Senate from the 24th and 26th district
- In office January 4, 1886 – January 1, 1888 Serving with George H. Ford
- Preceded by: S. P. Wolcott
- Succeeded by: J. P. Alexander; George H. Ford

Personal details
- Born: George Washington Crouse; November 23, 1832 Tallmadge, Ohio, U.S.
- Died: January 5, 1912 (aged 79) Akron, Ohio, U.S.
- Resting place: Glendale Cemetery, Akron
- Party: Republican
- Spouse: Martha K. Parsons
- Children: 5

Military service
- Allegiance: United States
- Branch/service: United States Army
- Unit: 164th Ohio Infantry

George Washington Crouse (November 23, 1832 – January 5, 1912) was an American businessman and American Civil War veteran who served one term as a U.S. representative from Ohio from 1887 to 1889.

== Biography ==
Born in Tallmadge, Ohio, Crouse attended the common schools. He taught school for five years. He moved to Akron, Ohio.

=== Early career ===
Deputy in offices of county auditor and treasurer 1855–1858. Auditor of Summit County from 1858 to 1863, he then served as county treasurer in 1863.

Manager in 1863 of the Akron branch of C. Aultman & Co. Buckeye, a mower and reaper business. Upon the organization of Aultman, Miller & Co. in 1865, as a separate corporation, Crouse became secretary and treasurer, and later its president.

=== Civil War ===
During the Civil War Crouse served as sergeant in Company F, 164th Ohio Infantry, and served in fortifications around Washington in 1864.

=== Early political career ===
He served as member and president of the city council for four years and of the board of education of the city of Akron four years. He was commissioner of Summit County in 1874 and 1875 and served as a member of the State senate from 1885 to 1887. In 1884 he was elected as a Third Class (honorary) Companion of the Military Order of the Loyal Legion of the United States in recognition of his support for the Union during the Civil War.

=== Congress ===
Crouse was elected as a Republican to the Fiftieth Congress (March 4, 1887 – March 3, 1889) but declined to be a candidate for renomination in 1888, resuming former business activities.

=== Family ===
Crouse married Martha K. Parsons of Kent, Ohio on October 18, 1859. Their children were Martha P., Julia M., Mary R., Nellie J., and George W., Jr. His daughter, Mary, married David Marshall Mason from Scotland who was a Member of Parliament at Westminster.

=== Death and burial ===
He died in Akron, Ohio, January 5, 1912, and was interred in Glendale Cemetery.

U.S. House of Representatives
Preceded by William McKinley	Member of the U.S. House of Representatives from Ohio's 20th congressional district 1887-1889	Succeeded by Martin L. Smyser
