= James A. D. Richards =

American politician

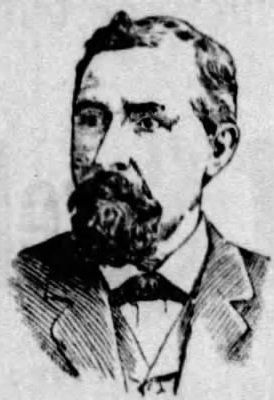
- The Marion Star (Marion, OH), October 19, 1892.

Member of the U.S. House of Representatives from Ohio's 17th district
- In office March 4, 1893 – March 3, 1895
- Preceded by: Albert J. Pearson
- Succeeded by: Addison S. McClure

Personal details
- Born: March 22, 1845 Boston, Massachusetts, U.S.
- Died: December 4, 1911 (aged 66) New Philadelphia, Ohio, U.S.
- Resting place: East Fair Street Cemetery
- Party: Democratic

James Alexander Dudley Richards (March 22, 1845 – December 4, 1911) was an American lawyer and politician who served as a U.S. representative from Ohio for one term from 1893 to 1895.

== Early life and career ==
Richards was born in Boston, Massachusetts, and spent his early life there and in New York City, where he received a common-school education. He moved to New Philadelphia, Ohio, in 1861. He studied law. He was admitted to the bar in 1867 and commenced practice in New Philadelphia.

== Congress ==
Richards was elected as a Democrat to the Fifty-third Congress (March 4, 1893 – March 3, 1895). He served as chairman of the Committee on Expenditures in the Post Office Department (Fifty-third Congress). He was an unsuccessful candidate for reelection in 1894 to the Fifty-fourth Congress.

== Later career ==
He resumed the practice of law in Washington, D.C., and subsequently returned to New Philadelphia, Ohio, and continued the practice of his profession.

== Death ==
He died in New Philadelphia, on December 4, 1911. He was interred in the East Fair Street Cemetery.

== Sources ==
- United States Congress. "James A. D. Richards (id: R000213)". Biographical Directory of the United States Congress.

U.S. House of Representatives
Preceded by Albert J. Pearson	Member of the U.S. House of Representatives from Ohio's 17th congressional district 1893-1895	Succeeded by Addison S. McClure
