= John W. Cassingham =

American politician

John Wilson Cassingham
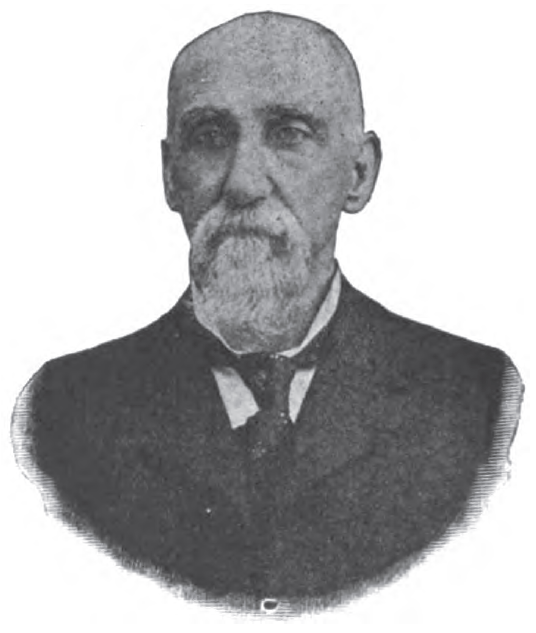

Member of the U.S. House of Representatives from Ohio's 17th district
- In office March 5, 1901 – March 3, 1905
- Preceded by: John A. McDowell
- Succeeded by: Martin L. Smyser

Personal details
- Born: June 22, 1840 Coshocton, Ohio, U.S.
- Died: March 14, 1930 (aged 89) Coshocton, Ohio, U.S.
- Party: Democratic

John Wilson Cassingham (June 22, 1840 – March 14, 1930) was a U.S. representative from Ohio for two terms from 1901 to 1905.

== Early life and career ==
Born in Coshocton, Ohio, Cassingham attended the public schools. Deputy county treasurer 1857-1868. He engaged in the mercantile business from 1868 to 1875 and in the mining of coal in 1875. Later also engaged in the manufacture of paper and in banking. County auditor 1880-1887. Trustee of the public library of Coshocton. He served as member of the board of education. He served as president of the Coshocton Board of Trade. He served as delegate to the Democratic National Convention in 1896.

== Congress ==
Cassingham was elected as a Democrat to the Fifty-seventh and Fifty-eighth Congresses (March 4, 1901 – March 3, 1905). He declined to be a candidate for reelection in 1904 to the Fifty-ninth Congress.

== Retirement and death ==
Reengaged in his former business interests in Coshocton until 1915, when he retired from active pursuits.

He died in Coshocton on March 14, 1930, and was interred in South Lawn Cemetery.

== Sources ==
- United States Congress. "John W. Cassingham (id: C000239)". Biographical Directory of the United States Congress.

U.S. House of Representatives
Preceded by John A. McDowell	Member of the U.S. House of Representatives from Ohio's 17th congressional district 1901-1905	Succeeded by Martin L. Smyser
