= Tri-City Airport (West Lafayette, Ohio) =

- IATA: none; ICAO: none; FAA LID: 80G

Summary
- Airport type: Public use
- Owner: Clyde R. Zimmer
- Serves: West Lafayette, Ohio
- Elevation AMSL: 844 ft / 257 m
- Coordinates: 40°14′52″N 081°44′09″W

Map
- Location of airport in Ohio 80G (the United States)

Runways
Direction	Length		Surface
Direction	ft	m	Surface
10/28	3,000	914	Turf

Statistics (2010)
- Aircraft operations: 8,085
- Based aircraft: 6
- Source: Federal Aviation Administration

Tri-City Airport (FAA LID: 80G) is a privately owned, public use airport located two nautical miles (4 km) southeast of the central business district of West Lafayette, a village in Coshocton County, Ohio, United States.

== Facilities and aircraft ==
Tri-City Airport covers an area of 10 acres (4 ha) at an elevation of 844 feet (257 m) above mean sea level. It has one runway designated 10/28 with a turf surface measuring 3,000 by 100 feet (914 x 30 m).

The airport does not have a fixed-base operator, and no fuel is available.

For the 12-month period ending July 22, 2010, the airport had 8,085 aircraft operations, an average of 22 per day: 99.9% general aviation and 0.1% military. At that time there were 6 aircraft based at this airport: 83% single-engine and 17% multi-engine.

== See also ==
- List of airports in Ohio
