= Martin L. Smyser =

American politician

Martin L. Snyder
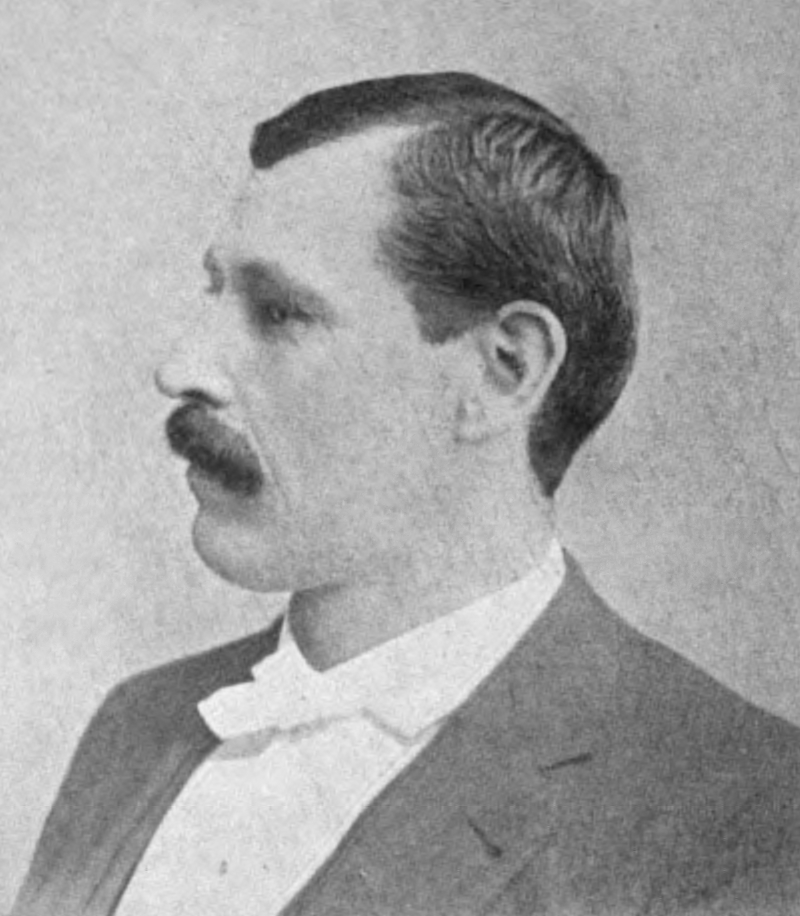

Member of the U.S. House of Representatives from Ohio
- In office March 4, 1889 – March 3, 1891
- Preceded by: George W. Crouse
- Succeeded by: Vincent A. Taylor
- Constituency: 20th district
- In office March 4, 1905 – March 3, 1907
- Preceded by: John W. Cassingham
- Succeeded by: William A. Ashbrook
- Constituency: 17th district

Judge of the Ohio Circuit Court for the Fifth Circuit
- In office January 14, 1898 – November 15, 1898
- Preceded by: Julius C. Pomerene
- Succeeded by: John M. Swartz

Personal details
- Born: Martin Luther Smyser; April 3, 1851 Wayne County, Ohio, U.S.
- Died: May 6, 1908 (aged 57) Wooster, Ohio, U.S.
- Resting place: Wooster Cemetery
- Party: Republican
- Education: Wittenberg College

Martin Luther Smyser (April 3, 1851 – May 6, 1908) was an American lawyer and politician who served two non-consecutive terms as a U.S. representative from Ohio.

== Biography ==
Born on a farm in Plain Township, Wayne County, Ohio, Smyser attended the common schools and was graduated from Wittenberg College, Springfield, Ohio, in 1870. He studied law at Wooster under Lyman R. Critchfield. He was admitted to the bar in 1872 and practiced in Wooster. In 1873 he entered into partnership with Addison S. McClure.

Smyser was elected prosecuting attorney of Wayne County in 1872 and served one term. He served as delegate to the Republican National Conventions in 1884 and 1888.

== Congress ==
Smyser was elected as a Republican to the Fifty-first Congress (March 4, 1889 – March 3, 1891). He was an unsuccessful candidate for reelection in 1890 to the Fifty-second Congress. He resumed the practice of law in Wooster. In 1898, he was appointed to the Fifth Circuit Court by Governor Bushnell upon the death of Judge Julius C. Pomerene. Smyser ran for re-election to a full six-year term later that year, but was defeated in the general election by Democratic nominee Richard M. Voorhees.

Smyser was elected as a Republican to the Fifty-ninth Congress (March 4, 1905 – March 3, 1907). He was an unsuccessful candidate for reelection in 1906 to the Sixtieth Congress.

=== Death and burial ===
He continued the practice of law in Wooster, Ohio, until his death in that city May 6, 1908. He was interred in Wooster Cemetery.

U.S. House of Representatives
| Preceded by George W. Crouse | Member of the U.S. House of Representatives from Ohio's 20th congressional district 1889-1891 | Succeeded by Vincent A. Taylor |
| Preceded by John W. Cassingham | Member of the U.S. House of Representatives from Ohio's 17th congressional district 1905-1907 | Succeeded by William A. Ashbrook |
