= John A. McDowell =

American politician

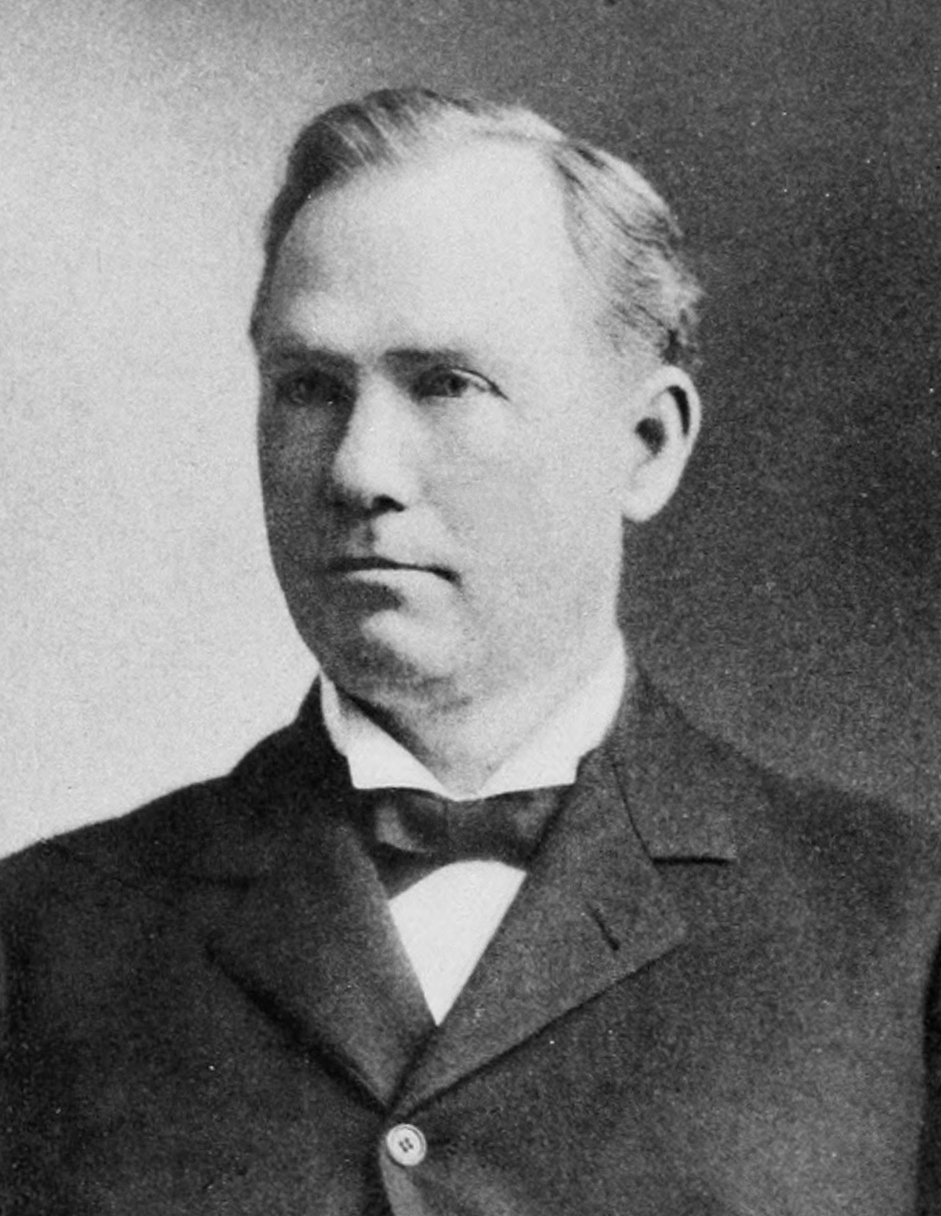

Member of the U.S. House of Representatives from Ohio's 17th district
- In office March 4, 1897 – March 3, 1901
- Preceded by: Addison S. McClure
- Succeeded by: John W. Cassingham

Personal details
- Born: John Anderson McDowell; September 25, 1853 Killbuck, Ohio, U.S.
- Died: October 2, 1927 (age 74) Cleveland, Ohio, U.S.
- Resting place: Oak Hill Cemetery, Millersburg, Ohio
- Party: Democratic
- Education: National Normal University

John Anderson McDowell (September 25, 1853 – October 2, 1927) was an American educator who served for two terms as a U.S. representative from Ohio for from 1897 to 1901.

== Biography ==
Born in Killbuck, Ohio, McDowell attended the common schools, the Millersburg High School, and Lebanon (Ohio) Normal College. He graduated from the Mount Union College, Alliance, Ohio, in 1887. He taught in rural schools from 1870 to 1877.

Following this he served as principal of Millersburg High School from 1877 to 1879. Superintendent of Millersburg schools from 1879 to 1896. County school examiner for twenty years. Instructor in the summer school of the College of Wooster, Ohio from 1896 to 1917 and in the summer school of Ashland College, Ohio in 1918.

=== Congress ===
McDowell was elected as a Democrat to the Fifty-fifth and Fifty-sixth Congresses, serving from March 4, 1897 to March 3, 1901).

=== Later career ===
He was an unsuccessful candidate for renomination in 1900. Superintendent of public instruction of the Ashland City School District 1908-1927. Trustee of the State normal college at Kent, Ohio from 1911 to 1922.

== Later life ==
He served as president of Northeastern Ohio Teachers' Association in 1921 and of Ohio State Teachers' Association in 1926. He was also interested in agricultural pursuits.

== Death and burial ==
He died in Cleveland, Ohio, October 2, 1927. He was interred in Oak Hill Cemetery, Millersburg, Ohio.

== Sources ==
- United States Congress. "John A. McDowell (id: M000421)". Biographical Directory of the United States Congress.

U.S. House of Representatives
Preceded by Addison S. McClure	Member of the U.S. House of Representatives from Ohio's 17th congressional district 1897-1901	Succeeded by John W. Cassingham
