= Robert W. Levering =

American politician

Bob Levering
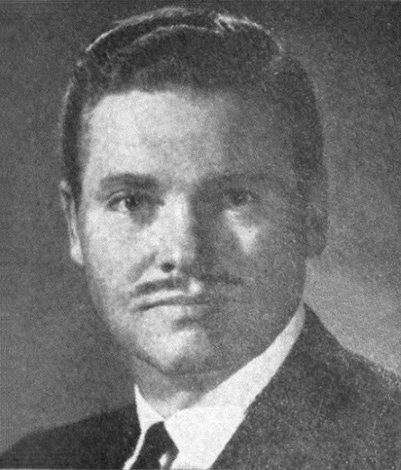

Member of the U.S. House of Representatives from Ohio's 17th district
- In office January 3, 1959 – January 3, 1961
- Preceded by: J. Harry McGregor
- Succeeded by: John M. Ashbrook

Personal details
- Born: Robert Woodrow Levering; October 3, 1914 Fredericktown, Ohio, U.S.
- Died: August 11, 1989 (aged 74) Fredericktown, Ohio, U.S.
- Party: Democratic
- Spouse: Rosemary Burdick Levering
- Education: Denison University; George Washington University Law School

Robert Woodrow Levering (October 3, 1914 – August 11, 1989) was an American lawyer and politician who served one term as a U.S. representative from Ohio from 1959 to 1961.

He was the son-in-law of Usher L. Burdick and brother-in-law of Quentin N. Burdick.

== Biography ==
Born near Fredericktown, Ohio was son of Gertrude Alice and Daniel Lloyd Levering, Levering graduated from Fredericktown High School. He earned his Bachelor of Arts in 1936 from Denison University, Granville, Ohio, and his Bachelor of Laws in 1940 from George Washington University Law School, Washington, D.C. He was a librarian at the Library of Congress from 1937 to 1941, and was a lawyer in private practice.

=== Early career ===
In July 1941, he became a civilian attorney working for the United States War Department in Manila, Philippines, where he became a prisoner of war during World War II from 1942 to 1945. He served as assistant attorney general of Ohio from 1949 to 1950. He was an unsuccessful Democratic candidate for election to Congress in 1948, 1950, 1954, and 1956.

=== Military service ===
Levering was in the United States Army Reserve and was promoted to major in 1960.

=== Congress ===
Levering was elected as a Democrat to the Eighty-sixth Congress (January 3, 1959 – January 3, 1961). He was an unsuccessful candidate for reelection to the Eighty-seventh Congress in 1960 and for election in 1962, 1964, and 1968.

=== Death and burial ===
He died on August 11, 1989, in Fredericktown, Ohio, and his remains were cremated.

== Publications ==
- Levering, Robert (1948). Horror trek; a true story of Bataan, the death march and three and one-half years in Japanese prison camps. Horstman Printing Co. ISBN 0806210362. OCLC 1168285.

U.S. House of Representatives
| Preceded by J. Harry McGregor | Member of the U.S. House of Representatives from Ohio's 17th congressional district 1959-1961 | Succeeded by John M. Ashbrook |
