= Smyser and English Pharmacy =

- U.S. National Register of Historic Places
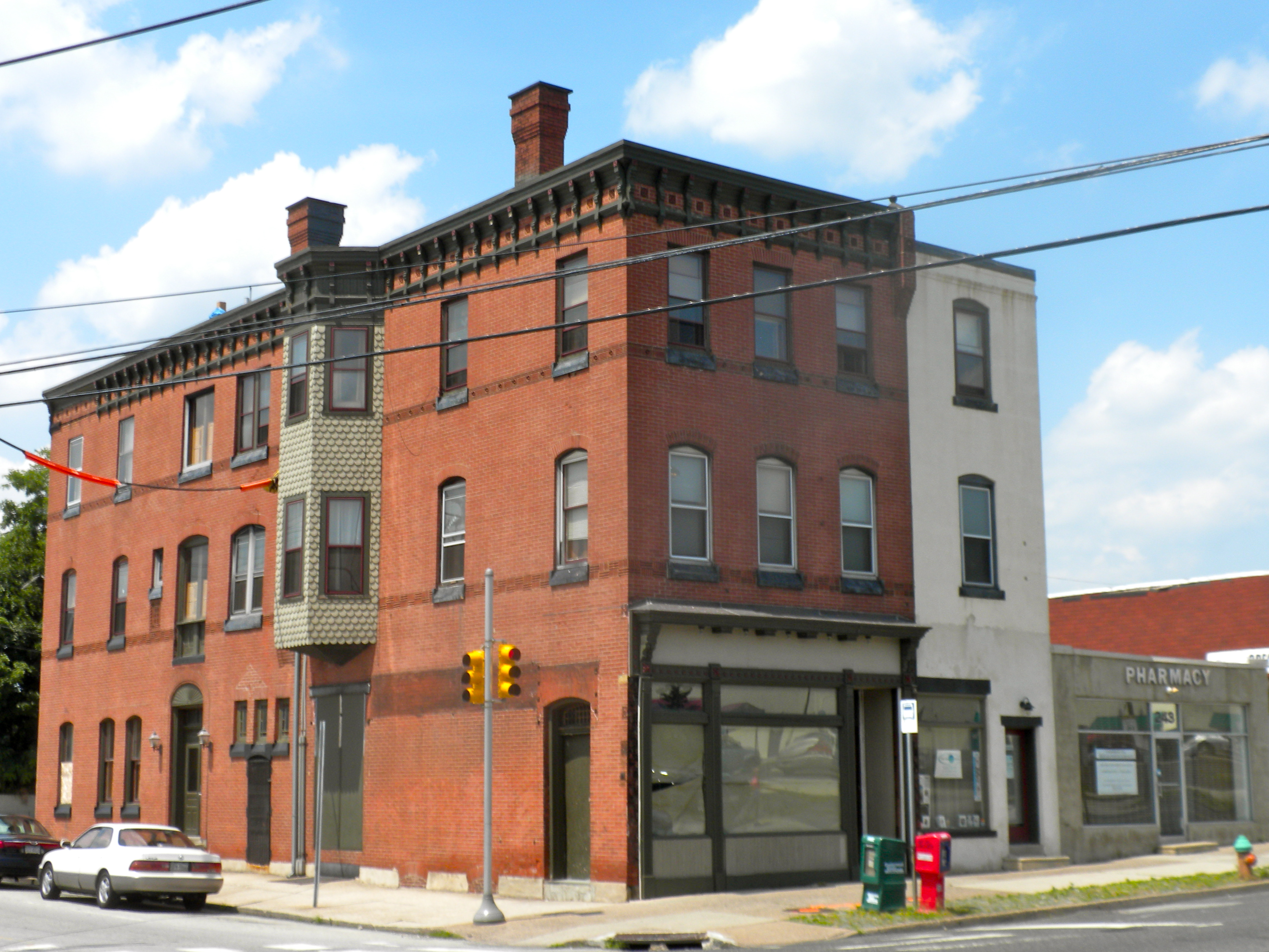
- Smyser and English Pharmacy, June 2010

- Location within Philadelphia Location within Pennsylvania Location within the United States
- Location: 245-247 W. Chelten Ave., Philadelphia, Pennsylvania
- Coordinates: 40°1′50″N 75°10′50″W
- Area: less than one acre
- Built: 1886-1887
- Architect: Caldwell, J.D.
- Architectural style: Queen Anne
- NRHP reference No.: 02000071
- Added to NRHP: February 20, 2002

The Smyser and English Pharmacy building, also known as the Leedom & Wissler Pharmacy, is an historic pharmacy building in the Germantown neighborhood of Philadelphia, Pennsylvania, United States.

It was added to the National Register of Historic Places in 2002.

== History and architectural features ==
Built between 1886 and 1887, this historic structure is a three-story, three-bay, rectangular brick building that was designed in the Queen Anne style and had a ground floor pharmacy, with offices and residences above until 1997. It features an ornamental cornice and terra cotta decorative details. The interior also features ornate tiled fireplaces.
