= White Eyes Township, Coshocton County, Ohio =

Township in Ohio, US

- Township
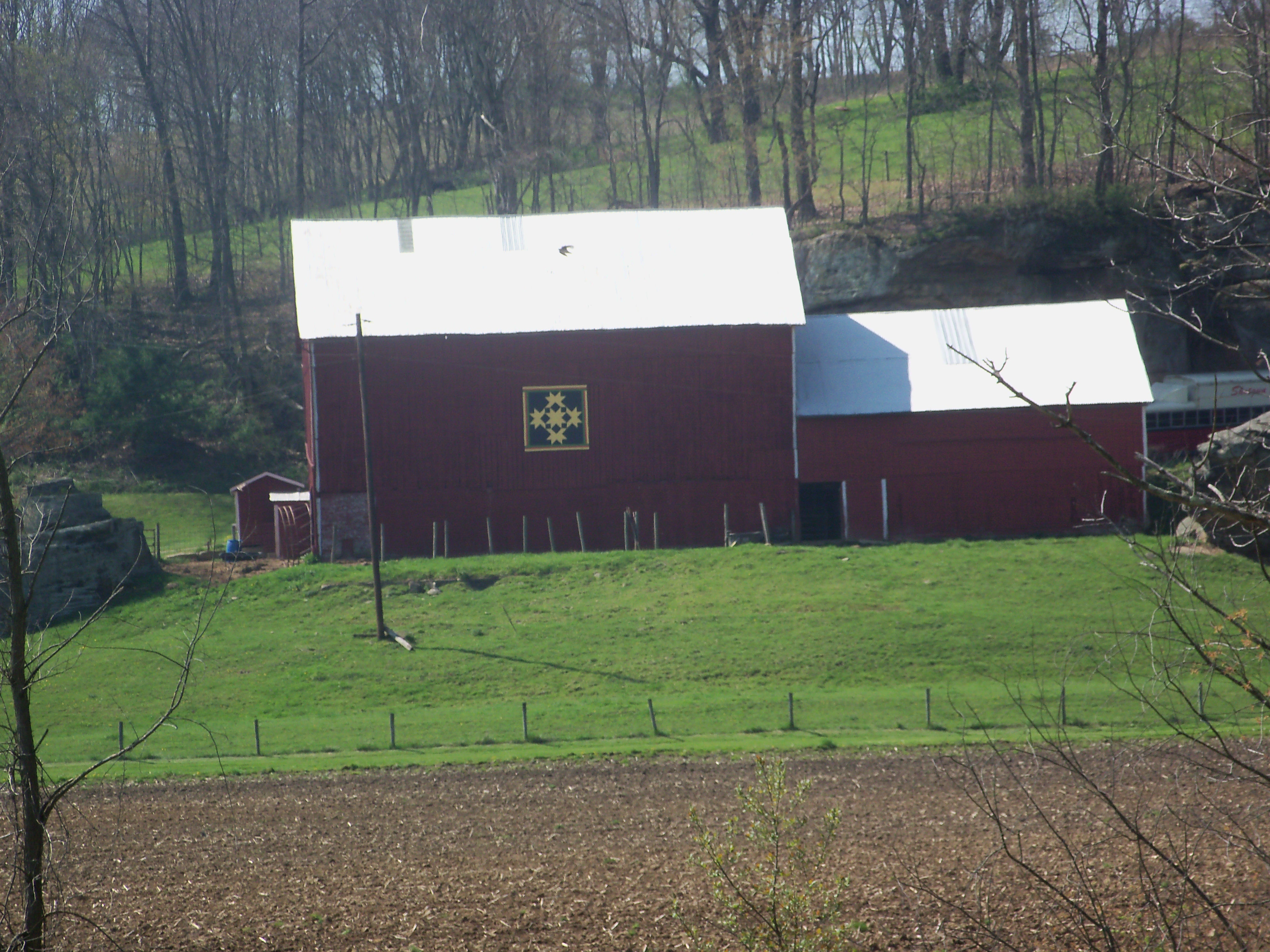
- A decorated barn near Ohio State Route 93

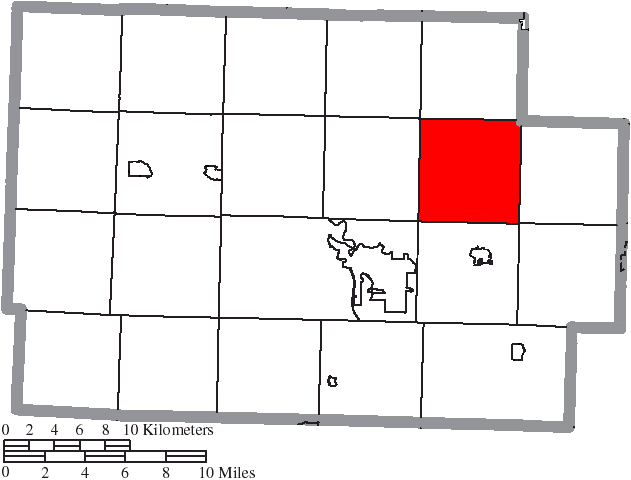
- Location of White Eyes Township in Coshocton County
- Coordinates: 40°20′26″N 81°45′5″W
- Country: United States
- State: Ohio
- County: Coshocton

Area
  - Total: 25.55 sq mi (66.18 km^{2})
  - Land: 25.53 sq mi (66.13 km^{2})
  - Water: 0.019 sq mi (0.05 km^{2})
- Elevation: 850 ft (259 m)

Population (2020)
  - Total: 1,222
  - Density: 47.86/sq mi (18.48/km^{2})
- Time zone: UTC-5 (Eastern (EST))
  - Summer (DST): UTC-4 (EDT)
- FIPS code: 39-84714
- GNIS feature ID: 1085931

White Eyes Township is one of the twenty-two townships of Coshocton County, Ohio, United States. As of the 2020 census the population was 1,222.

== Geography ==
Located in the northeastern part of the county, it borders the following townships:

- Crawford Township - north
- Bucks Township, Tuscarawas County - northeast corner
- Adams Township - east
- Oxford Township - southeast corner
- Lafayette Township - south
- Tuscarawas Township - southwest corner
- Keene Township - west
- Mill Creek Township - northwest corner

No municipalities are located in White Eyes Township, although the census-designated place of Fresno lies in the eastern part of the township.

== Name and history ==
White Eyes Township was organized in 1823. It was named for White Eyes, a Lenape (Delaware) chief who lived in the Tuscarawas valley.

It is the only White Eyes Township statewide.

== Government ==
The township is governed by a three-member board of trustees, who are elected in November of odd-numbered years to a four-year term beginning on the following January 1. Two are elected in the year after the presidential election and one is elected in the year before it. There is also an elected township fiscal officer, who serves a four-year term beginning on April 1 of the year after the election, which is held in November of the year before the presidential election. Vacancies in the fiscal officership or on the board of trustees are filled by the remaining trustees.
