= Ridgewood High School (West Lafayette, Ohio) =

Public high school in West Lafayette, Ohio, United States

Location
- 602 Johnson Street; West Lafayette, (Coshocton County), Ohio 43845; United States
- Coordinates: 40°16′12″N 81°45′25″W

Information
- Type: Public high school
- Superintendent: Mike Masloski
- Principal: Todd Stoffer
- Grades: 8 thru 12
- Colors: Orange and Black
- Athletics conference: Inter-Valley Conference
- Mascot: General
- Team name: Generals
- Website: ridgewood.k12.oh.us

Ridgewood High School is a public high school in West Lafayette, Ohio. It is the only high school in the Ridgewood Local School District.

The district has six buildings, including one elementary school, one middle school and one high school, as well as district administrative buildings. A new high school building opened in 2002. Ridgewood High School has fewer than 550 students. West Lafayette had 2,313 residents at the 2000 census and is the second largest municipality in rural Coshocton County.

== Notable alumni ==
Brian Olinger is a professional runner, Big Ten champion, and All-American cross country runner. He was also a Division III state champion in cross country (2000) and both a Division II and III state champion in the 3200 in track (2000 and 2001).

Madison Rayne is a professional wrestler for Total Nonstop Action.
