= Canal Lewisville, Ohio =

- Census-designated place
- Location within Ohio
- Coordinates: 40°17′56″N 81°50′25″W
- Country: United States
- State: Ohio
- County: Coshocton
- Townships: Keene, Tuscarawas

Area
  - Total: 0.42 sq mi (1.08 km^{2})
  - Land: 0.42 sq mi (1.08 km^{2})
  - Water: 0 sq mi (0.00 km^{2})
- Elevation: 768 ft (234 m)

Population (2020)
  - Total: 417
  - Density: 998.2/sq mi (385.39/km^{2})
- Time zone: UTC-5 (Eastern (EST))
  - Summer (DST): UTC-4 (EDT)
- Area code: 740
- FIPS code: 39-11318
- GNIS feature ID: 2628871

Canal Lewisville is an unincorporated community and census-designated place (CDP) in Coshocton County, Ohio, in the United States. As of the 2020 census it had a population of 417.

== History ==
Canal Lewisville had its start by the building of the Ohio Canal through that territory. It was laid out as a town in 1832 by T. Butler Lewis and others, and named for the former. A post office called Canal Lewisville was established in 1845, and remained in operation until 1915.

== Geography ==
Canal Lewisville is located in east-central Coshocton County on the border of Keene and Tuscarawas townships. It is on the north bank of the Tuscarawas River, 3.3 miles (5.3 km) northeast (upstream) of its confluence with the Walhonding River at Coshocton to form the Muskingum River, a tributary of the Ohio.

According to the United States Census Bureau, the CDP has an area of 0.42 square miles (1.1 km^{2}), all land.

== Demographics ==
Historical population
Census	Pop.	Note	%±
2020	417		—
U.S. Decennial Census
