= Keene Township, Coshocton County, Ohio =

Township in Ohio, US

- Township
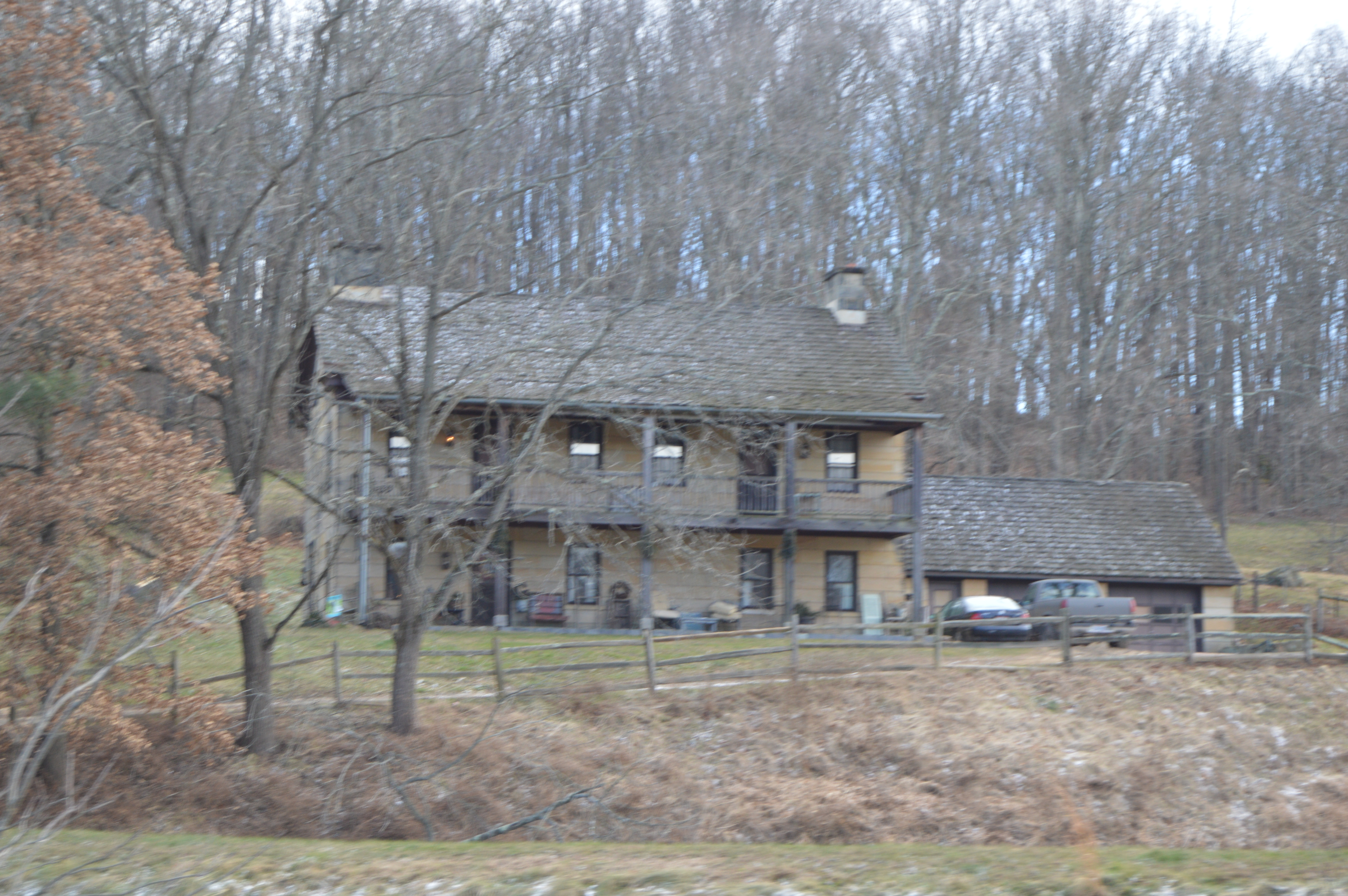
- The Cuthbert Milligan House

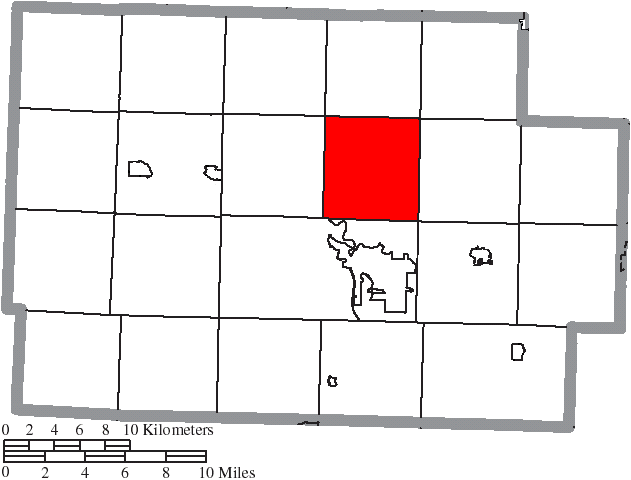
- Location of Keene Township in Coshocton County
- Coordinates: 40°19′27″N 81°51′24″W
- Country: United States
- State: Ohio
- County: Coshocton

Area
  - Total: 24.0 sq mi (62.1 km^{2})
  - Land: 23.9 sq mi (61.9 km^{2})
  - Water: 0.039 sq mi (0.1 km^{2})
- Elevation: 935 ft (285 m)

Population (2020)
  - Total: 1,623
  - Density: 67.9/sq mi (26.2/km^{2})
- Time zone: UTC-5 (Eastern (EST))
  - Summer (DST): UTC-4 (EDT)
- ZIP code: 43828
- Area code: 740
- FIPS code: 39-39634
- GNIS feature ID: 1085918

Keene Township is one of the twenty-two townships of Coshocton County, Ohio, United States. As of the 2020 census the population was 1,623.

== Geography ==
Located in the north central part of the county, it borders the following townships:

- Mill Creek Township - north
- Crawford Township - northeast corner
- White Eyes Township - east
- Lafayette Township - southeast corner
- Tuscarawas Township - south
- Jackson Township - southwest
- Bethlehem Township - west
- Clark Township - northwest corner

No municipalities are located in Keene Township, although the unincorporated community of Keene lies at the center of the township, and the census-designated place of Canal Lewisville lies on its border with Tuscarawas Township.

== Name and history ==
Keene Township was organized in 1824. It was named after Keene, New Hampshire.

It is the only Keene Township statewide.

== Government ==
The township is governed by a three-member board of trustees, who are elected in November of odd-numbered years to a four-year term beginning on the following January 1. Two are elected in the year after the presidential election and one is elected in the year before it. There is also an elected township fiscal officer, who serves a four-year term beginning on April 1 of the year after the election, which is held in November of the year before the presidential election. Vacancies in the fiscal officership or on the board of trustees are filled by the remaining trustees.
