= Charles F. West (politician) =

American politician

Charles Franklin West
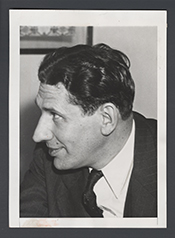

Member of the U.S. House of Representatives from Ohio's 17th district
- In office March 4, 1931 – January 3, 1935
- Preceded by: William M. Morgan
- Succeeded by: William A. Ashbrook

Personal details
- Born: January 12, 1895 Mount Vernon, Ohio, U.S.
- Died: December 27, 1955 (aged 60) Bradenton, Florida, U.S.
- Party: Democratic
- Education: Ohio Wesleyan University; Harvard University

Charles Franklin West (January 12, 1895 – December 27, 1955) was an American educator and politician who served two terms as a member of the United States House of Representatives from 1931 to 1935.

== Biography ==
West was born in Mount Vernon, Ohio. he received his education at local schools, and in later years, graduated from Ohio Wesleyan University in 1918 and enrolled at Harvard University in 1920. Between the years of 1924 and 1930, he served as a professor of political science at Denison University.

West was nominated, and elected as a Democrat to the seventy second and seventy-third congresses, he took up this role between March 4, 1931 and January 3, 1935. West had an unsuccessful nomination to become the United States Senator, however despite this failing to succeed, West continued other roles including delegate to the Democratic National Convention, among other careers at different times. Between 1940 and 1947, West engaged in unknown private business, only to leave this and become a professor at Akron University. West received the Democratic nomination to the eighty-fourth congress, but withdrew before the election. he died in Bradenton, Florida, aged 60.

U.S. House of Representatives
Preceded by William M. Morgan	Member of the U.S. House of Representatives from Ohio's 17th congressional district 1931-1935	Succeeded by William A. Ashbrook
