= Salvatore Pansino =

American engineer

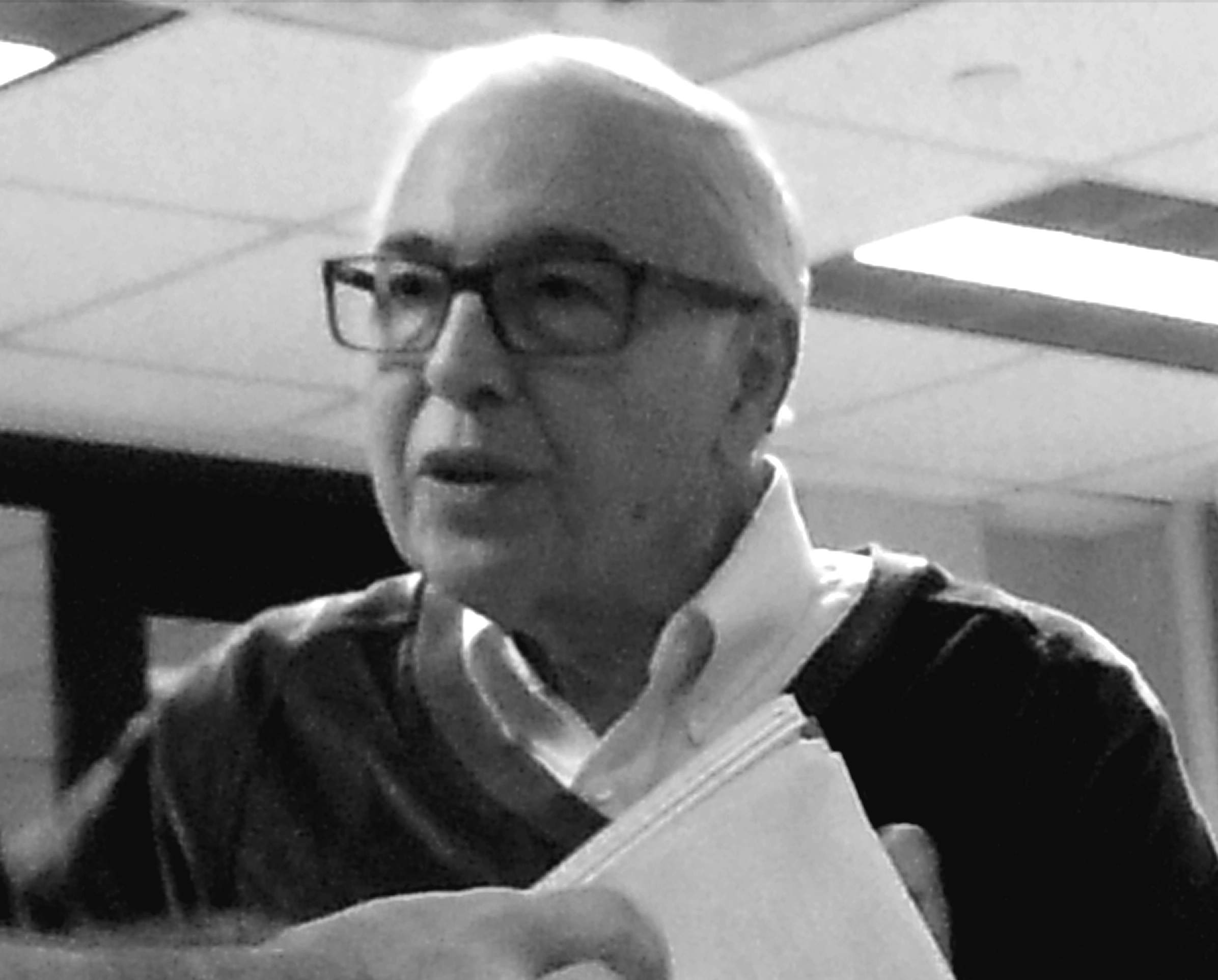
- Born: Salvatore Rocco Vincent Pansino; 1934 (age 91–92)
- Education: Doctorate Degree in Electrical Engineering
- Alma mater: Carnegie Mellon University
- Occupation: Professor of Electrical Engineering
- Employer: Youngstown State University
- Political party: Republican
- Opponent: Jim Traficant

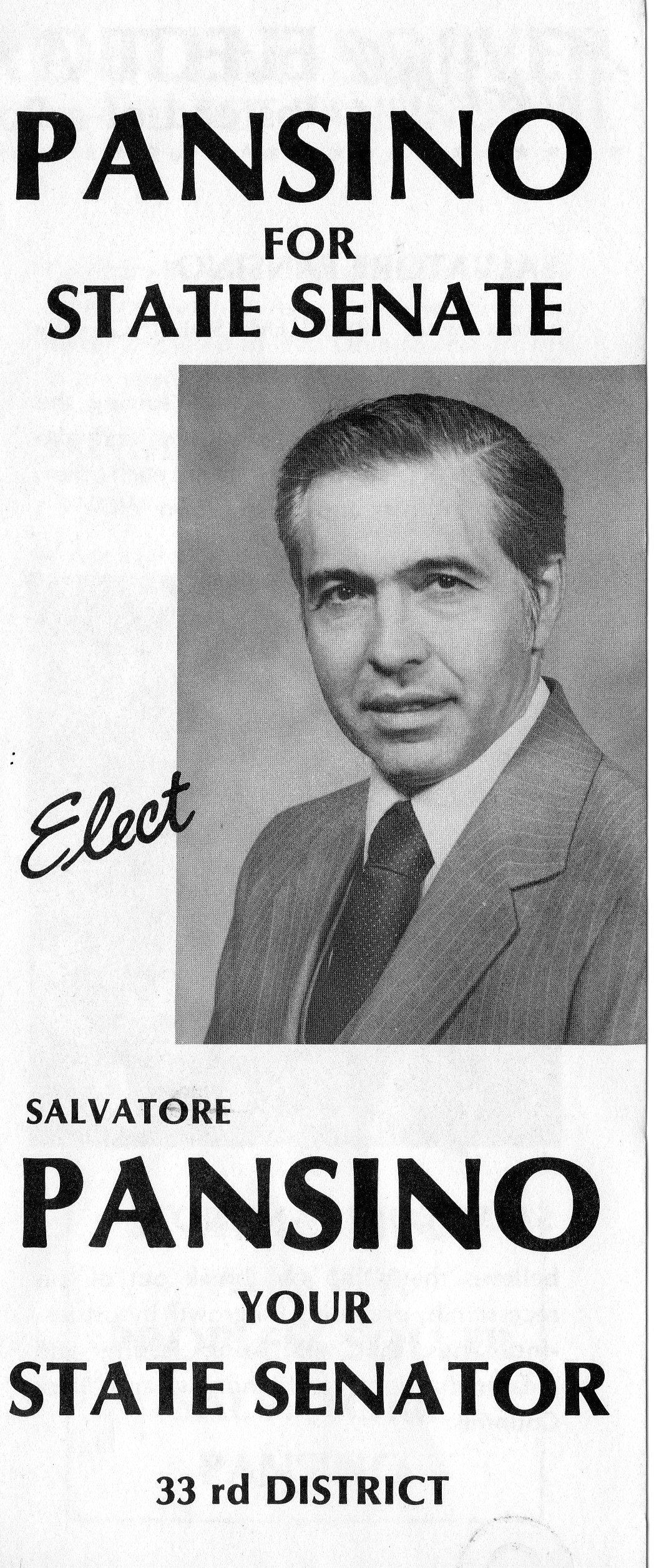
Campaign flyer

Salvatore Rocco Vincent Pansino is an American professor of electrical engineering at Youngstown State University in Youngstown, Ohio. In 1992, he ran against Congressman Jim Traficant as the Republican candidate in Ohio's 17th congressional district, losing the race.

Pansino received a B.S. in electrical engineering from Carnegie Mellon University in 1957, an M.S. in physics from Franklin & Marshall College in 1961, a Ph.D. in electrical engineering from Carnegie Mellon University in 1968, and an LL.B. in law from La Salle Extension. He worked for a while at Babcock & Wilcox, which makes nuclear parts for nuclear industry. He is proudest of his concentric water flow design to filter radioactive particles from water. For a while he worked for Bailey Controls working various projects. He later left the industry to teach which is his passion, compared to dealing with people and projects for companies.

Pansino teaches classes pertaining to Maxwell's Equations, including Electromagnetic Fields 1 and 2 including lab work, Energy Conversions, and Signals and Systems.

On April 27, 2017, Pansino was acknowledged for 35 years of service during the Third Annual STEM Honors Convocation held at Youngstown State University.

== See also ==
- Youngstown State University
- James Traficant
