= Addison S. McClure =

American politician

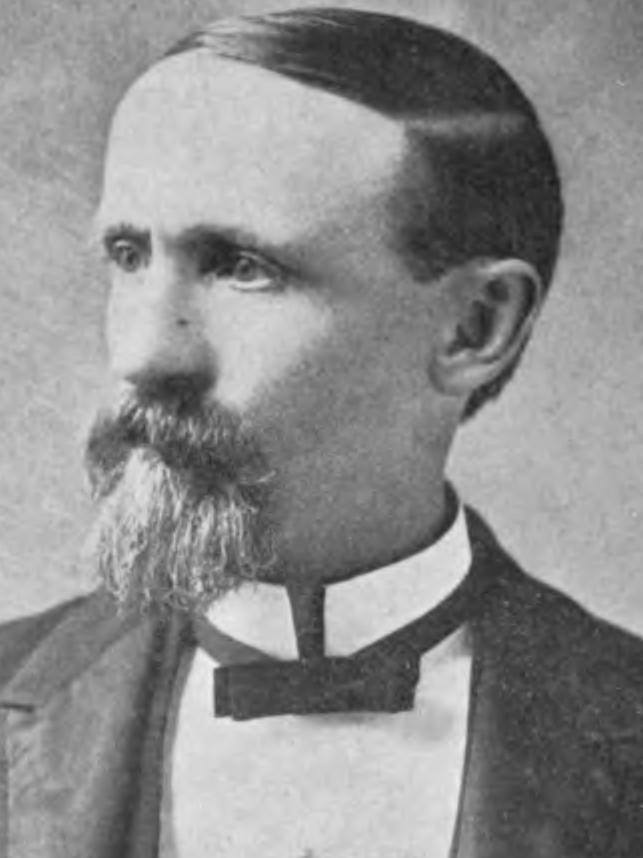

Member of the U.S. House of Representatives from Ohio
- In office March 4, 1881 – March 3, 1883
- Preceded by: Jonathan T. Updegraff
- Succeeded by: William McKinley
- Constituency: 18th district
- In office March 4, 1895 – March 3, 1897
- Preceded by: James A. D. Richards
- Succeeded by: John A. McDowell
- Constituency: 17th district

Personal details
- Born: October 10, 1839 Wooster, Ohio, U.S.
- Died: April 17, 1903 (aged 63) Wooster, Ohio, U.S.
- Resting place: Wooster Cemetery
- Party: Republican
- Spouse: Mary L. Brigham
- Children: one son

Military service
- Allegiance: United States of America
- Branch/service: Union Army
- Years of service: April 1861 – August 1864
- Rank: Captain
- Unit: 16th Ohio Infantry

Addison Smith McClure (October 10, 1839 – April 17, 1903) was an American lawyer and politician who served two non-consecutive terms as a U.S. representative from Ohio in the late 19th century.

== Biography ==
Born in Wooster, Ohio, McClure pursued an academic course in Jefferson College, Canonsburg, Pennsylvania (now Washington & Jefferson College). He studied law in the office of Martin Welker, was admitted to the bar in 1861, thereafter practicing in Wooster. He entered the Army as a private in April 1861. He was elected captain of Company H, Sixteenth Regiment, Ohio Volunteer Infantry, in October of the same year. He was captured December 29, 1862, during the Vicksburg Campaign, and held as a prisoner of war until he was exchanged in May 1863. He was discharged in August 1864.

He served as recorder of Wayne County in 1867. He was also appointed postmaster of Wooster in 1867, and reappointed in both 1872 and 1876. He served as delegate to the Republican National Convention in 1868 and 1876.

McClure married Mary L. Brigham of Vienna Township, Michigan on September 26, 1866. They had one son.

=== Congress ===
McClure was elected as a Republican to the Forty-seventh Congress (March 4, 1881 – March 3, 1883). While he was not reelected in 1882, he was elected to the Fifty-fourth Congress (March 4, 1895 – March 3, 1897). Again failing to be reelected in 1896, McClure resumed the practice of law.

=== Death ===
He died in Wooster, Ohio, on April 17, 1903. He was interred in Wooster Cemetery.

== See also ==
U.S. House of Representatives
Preceded by Jonathan T. Updegraff	Member of the U.S. House of Representatives from Ohio's 17th congressional district 1881–1883	Succeeded by William McKinley
Preceded by James A. D. Richards	Member of the U.S. House of Representatives from Ohio's 17th congressional district 1895–1897	Succeeded by John A. McDowell
