= Lafayette Township, Coshocton County, Ohio =

Township in Ohio, US

- Township
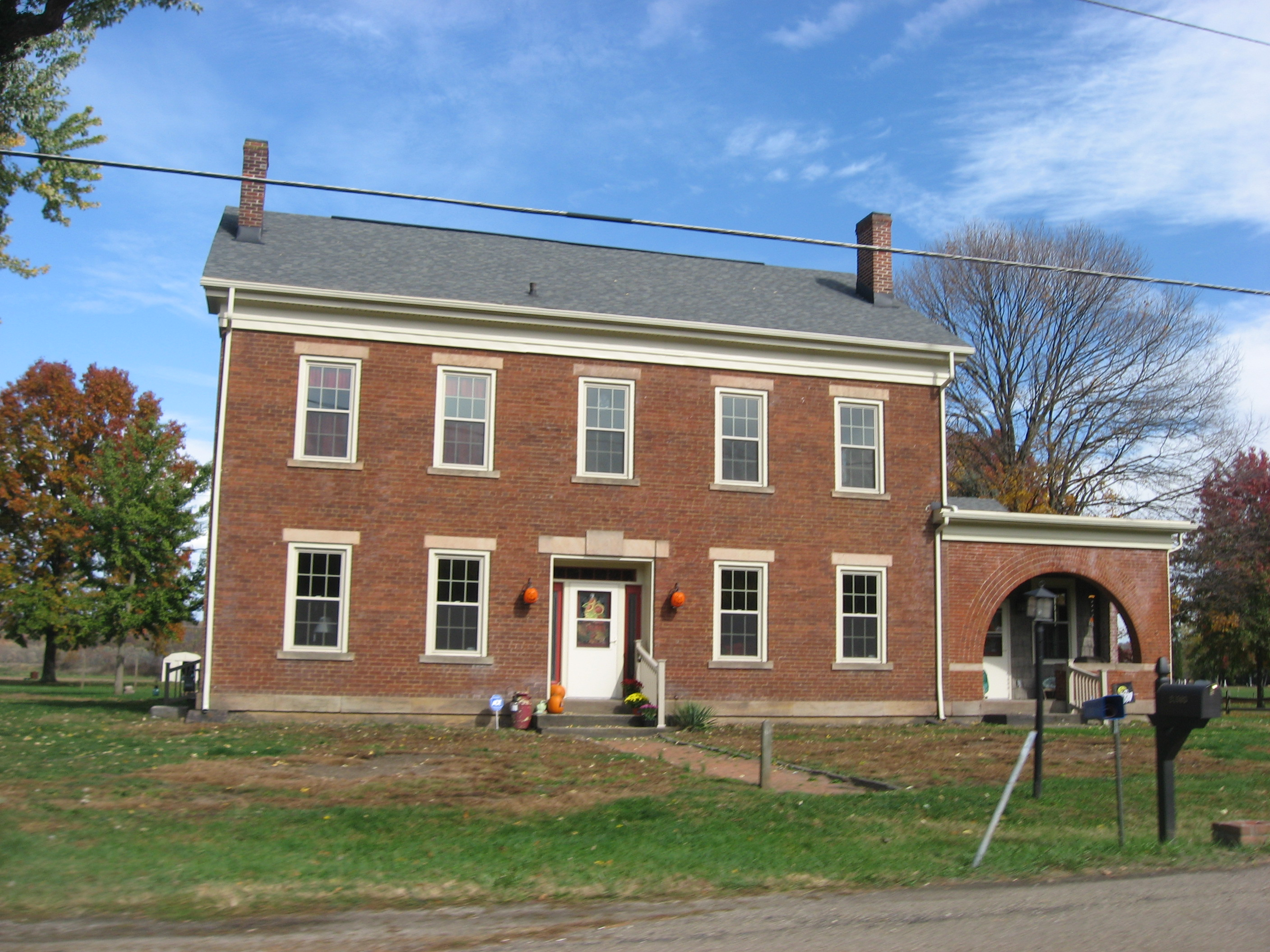
- The Andrew Ferguson House near West Lafayette

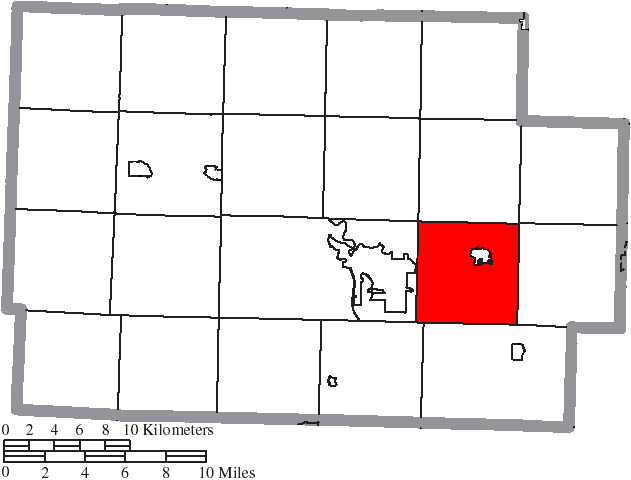
- Location of Lafayette Township in Coshocton County
- Coordinates: 40°16′19″N 81°45′26″W
- Country: United States
- State: Ohio
- County: Coshocton

Area
  - Total: 25.1 sq mi (65.0 km^{2})
  - Land: 24.7 sq mi (63.9 km^{2})
  - Water: 0.42 sq mi (1.1 km^{2})
- Elevation: 804 ft (245 m)

Population (2020)
  - Total: 4,250
  - Density: 172/sq mi (66.5/km^{2})
- Time zone: UTC-5 (Eastern (EST))
  - Summer (DST): UTC-4 (EDT)
- FIPS code: 39-41132
- GNIS feature ID: 1085919

Lafayette Township is one of the twenty-two townships of Coshocton County, Ohio, United States. The 2020 census reported 4,250 people living in the township.

== Geography ==
Located in the southeastern part of the county, it borders the following townships:

- White Eyes Township - north
- Adams Township - northeast corner
- Oxford Township - east
- Linton Township - south
- Franklin Township - southwest
- Tuscarawas Township - west
- Keene Township - northwest corner

The village of West Lafayette is located in northeastern Lafayette Township.

== Name and history ==
Lafayette Township was the last township in Coshocton County to be organized, in 1835. It was named for Gilbert du Motier, Marquis de Lafayette, whose death had occurred in 1834.

Statewide, the only other Lafayette Township is located in Medina County.

== Government ==
The township is governed by a three-member board of trustees, who are elected in November of odd-numbered years to a four-year term beginning on the following January 1. Two are elected in the year after the presidential election and one is elected in the year before it. There is also an elected township fiscal officer, who serves a four-year term beginning on April 1 of the year after the election, which is held in November of the year before the presidential election. Vacancies in the fiscal officership or on the board of trustees are filled by the remaining trustees.
