= Tuscarawas Township, Coshocton County, Ohio =

Township in Ohio, US

- Township
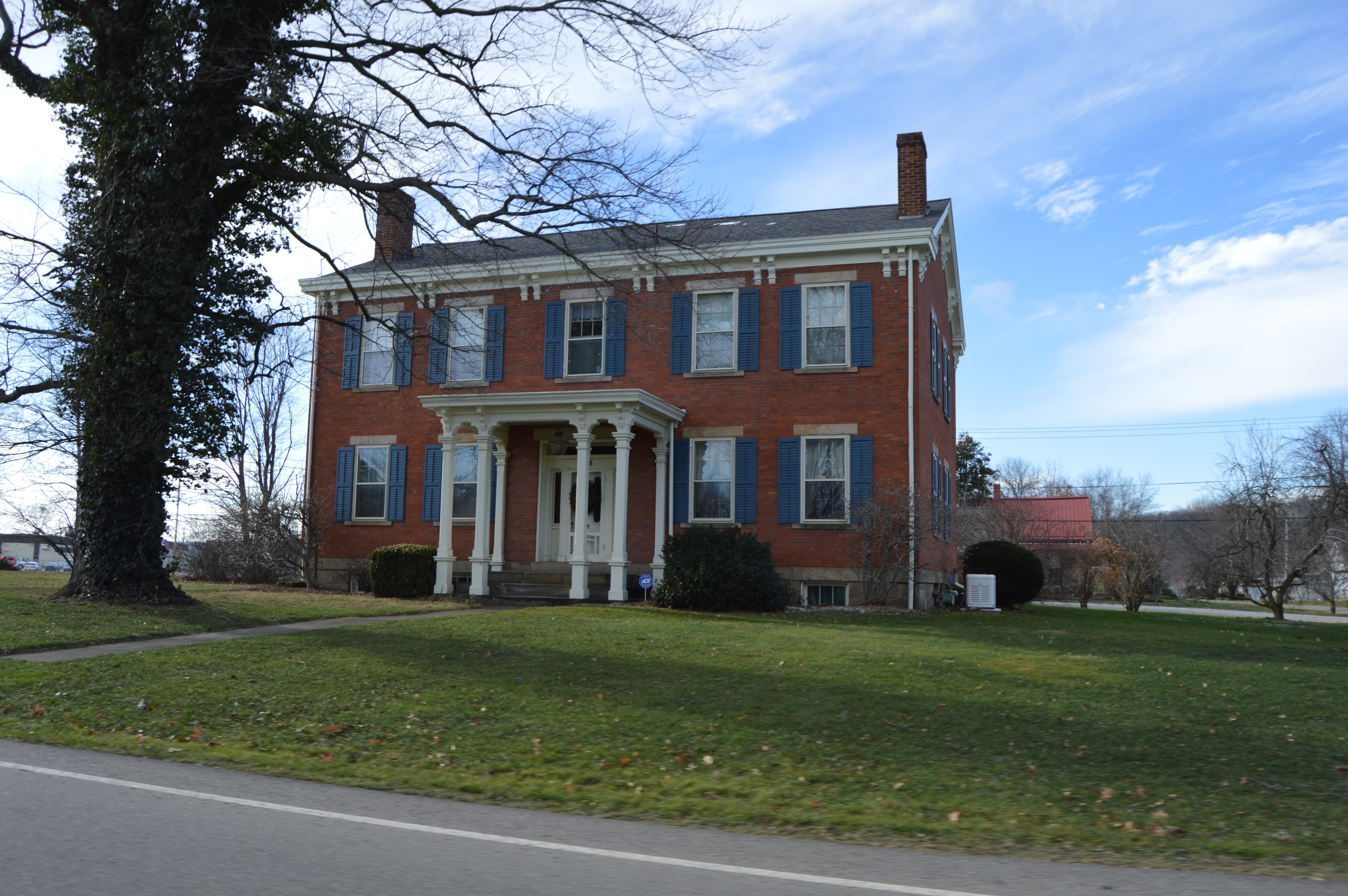
- Lamberson-Markley House in Canal Lewisville

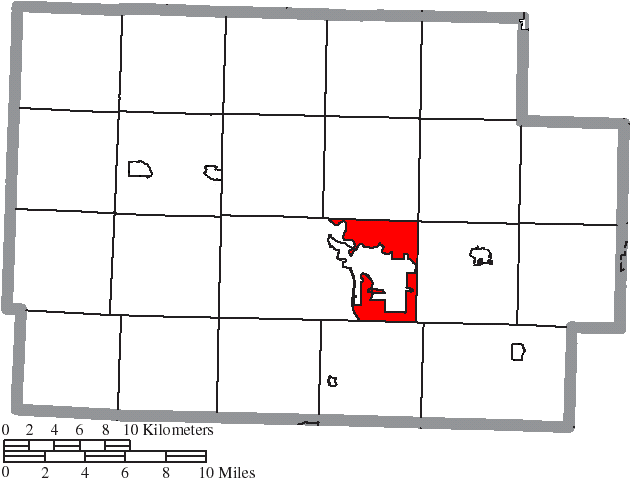
- Location of Tuscarawas Township in Coshocton County
- Coordinates: 40°15′21″N 81°51′20″W
- Country: United States
- State: Ohio
- County: Coshocton

Area
  - Total: 9.3 sq mi (24.0 km^{2})
  - Land: 8.8 sq mi (22.9 km^{2})
  - Water: 0.42 sq mi (1.1 km^{2})
- Elevation: 781 ft (238 m)

Population (2020)
  - Total: 1,759
  - Density: 199/sq mi (76.8/km^{2})
- Time zone: UTC-5 (Eastern (EST))
  - Summer (DST): UTC-4 (EDT)
- FIPS code: 39-77896
- GNIS feature ID: 1085928

Tuscarawas Township is one of the twenty-two townships of Coshocton County, Ohio, United States. As of the 2020 census the population was 1,759.

== Geography ==
Located in the south central part of the county, it borders the following townships:

- Keene Township - north
- White Eyes Township - northeast corner
- Lafayette Township - east
- Franklin Township - south
- Jackson Township - west

Most of Tuscarawas Township is now occupied by the city of Coshocton, the county seat of Coshocton County. The census-designated place of Canal Lewisville lies on its border with Keene Township.

== Name and history ==
Tuscarawas Township was organized in 1811.

Statewide, the only other Tuscarawas Township is located in Stark County.

== Government ==
The township is governed by a three-member board of trustees, who are elected in November of odd-numbered years to a four-year term beginning on the following January 1. Two are elected in the year after the presidential election and one is elected in the year before it. There is also an elected township fiscal officer, who serves a four-year term beginning on April 1 of the year after the election, which is held in November of the year before the presidential election. Vacancies in the fiscal officership or on the board of trustees are filled by the remaining trustees.
