= James Traficant =

American politician (1941–2014)

Jim Traficant
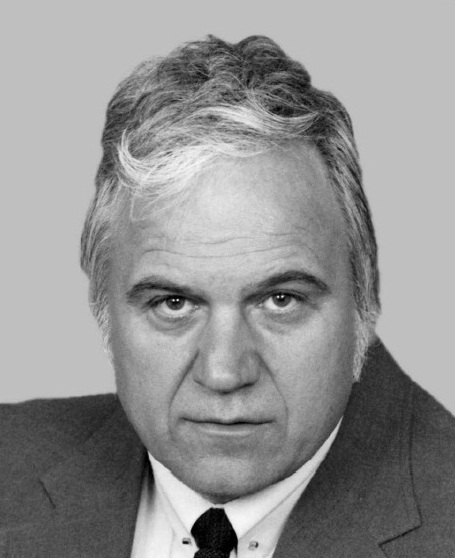
- Official portrait, 1997

Member of the U.S. House of Representatives from Ohio's 17th district
- In office January 3, 1985 – July 24, 2002
- Preceded by: Lyle Williams
- Succeeded by: Tim Ryan

Sheriff of Mahoning County
- In office 1981–1984
- Preceded by: George D. Tablack
- Succeeded by: Edward Nemeth

Personal details
- Born: James Anthony Traficant Jr. May 8, 1941 Youngstown, Ohio, U.S.
- Died: September 27, 2014 (aged 73) Poland, Ohio, U.S.
- Party: Independent (from 2002)
- Other political affiliations: Democratic (until 2002)
- Spouse: Tish Choppa
- Education: University of Pittsburgh (BS, MS); Youngstown State University (MS)
- James Traficant's voice Traficant speaks on the importance of water resource projects Recorded September 26, 1996

James Anthony Traficant Jr. (/ˈtræfɪkənt/ TRAF-ih-kənt; May 8, 1941 – September 27, 2014) was an American politician who served as a Democratic member of the United States House of Representatives from Ohio. A staunch economic populist known for his flamboyant personality, he represented the 17th congressional district, which centered on his hometown of Youngstown and included parts of three counties in northeast Ohio's Mahoning Valley.

Traficant was expelled from the House on July 24, 2002, after being convicted of 10 felony counts, including taking bribes, filing false tax returns, racketeering, and forcing his congressional staff to perform chores at his farm in Ohio and houseboat in Washington, D.C. He was sentenced to prison and released on September 2, 2009, after serving a 7-year sentence. Traficant died on September 27, 2014, following a tractor accident at his farm in Green Township, Ohio.

Traficant was a moderate to conservative Democrat, and both his personality and his political views have been argued to be a predecessor to Trumpism.

== Early life and education ==
Born into a working-class Catholic family in Youngstown, Ohio, Traficant was the son of Agnes (née Farkas) and James Anthony Traficant. He was of mostly Italian and Hungarian ancestry. Traficant graduated from Cardinal Mooney High School in 1959 before receiving a B.S. in education from the University of Pittsburgh in 1963. He played quarterback for Pitt's football team, and his teammates included Mike Ditka. Traficant was drafted in the NFL's twentieth round (276th overall) by the Pittsburgh Steelers in 1963, and tried out for the Steelers and the Oakland Raiders of the American Football League, but did not play professionally. He later obtained an M.S. in educational administration from the University of Pittsburgh in 1973 and a second Master's degree in counseling from Youngstown State University in 1976.

== Early career ==
At the start of his career, Traficant was the consumer finance director for the Youngstown Community Action Program. He taught courses on drug and alcohol dependency and recovery at Youngstown State University and Kent State University, as well as lecturing on drug and alcohol abuse for colleges and government agencies outside Ohio. In addition, Traficant taught at the Ohio Peace Officer Training Academy. He was the executive director of the Mahoning County Drug Program from 1971 to 1981, and sheriff of Mahoning County from 1981 to 1985.

While serving as sheriff, Traficant made national headlines by refusing to execute foreclosure orders on several unemployed homeowners. This endeared him to the local population, which was dealing with the consequences of the loss of steel-associated businesses. In 1983, he was charged with racketeering, under the Racketeer Influenced and Corrupt Organizations Act (RICO), for accepting bribes. Representing himself in the trial, he argued that he had been undertaking an undercover investigation into corruption. He was acquitted, becoming the only person to date who has won a RICO case while representing themself.

Traficant's time as sheriff served as the focus of Crooked City: Youngstown, OH., a podcast produced by Marc Smerling.

== U.S. House of Representatives (1985–2002) ==
Publicity from the RICO trial increased Traficant's local visibility. He was elected in 1984 as a Democrat to Congress from Ohio's 17th District, defeating Lyle Williams, a three-term Republican incumbent. He was reelected eight times without serious opposition.

Traficant was infamous during his time in Congress for his short, rambling, and often crude rants on the House floor, often decrying his key issues such as his opposition to free trade and the IRS. He became known for ending speeches with the Star Trek reference "Beam me up!", and wearing cowboy boots, polyester suits, and a toupee.

While in Congress, Traficant was a supporter of immigration reduction. His major legislative accomplishment was restraining the Internal Revenue Service from taking punitive action against delinquent taxpayers. Traficant was also known for frequently pushing to include "Buy American" provisions in spending bills.

After the Republicans took control of the House in 1995, Traficant tended to vote more often with the Republicans than with his own party. On the issue of abortion, he voted with the position of the National Right to Life Committee 95% of the time in the 105th Congress, and 100% of the time in the 106th and 107th Congresses. However, he voted against all four articles of impeachment against Bill Clinton. After he voted for Republican Dennis Hastert for Speaker of the House in 2001, the Democrats stripped him of his seniority and refused to give him any committee assignments. Because the Republicans did not assign him to any committees either, he became the first member of the House of Representatives in over a century (outside the top leadership) to lack a single committee assignment.

Traficant twice asked the FBI to investigate the missing persons case of Philip Taylor Kramer, whose family he knew. The FBI opened a case, but did not launch a new criminal investigation, although it did assist the Ventura County sheriff's office in the matter. Traficant's office also did some investigation of its own.

=== Defense of John Demjanjuk ===
Traficant championed the unpopular case of John Demjanjuk, a Ukrainian-born autoworker from Seven Hills who had been convicted in Israel and sentenced to hang for having been the brutal Nazi concentration camp guard nicknamed "Ivan the Terrible". For almost a decade, Traficant, along with Pat Buchanan, insisted that Demjanjuk had been denied a fair trial, and been the victim of mistaken identity. In 1993, the Supreme Court of Israel overturned the conviction on the basis of reasonable doubt. Demjanjuk was later deported to Germany on May 11, 2009, after the Supreme Court of the United States refused to overturn his deportation order. Demjanjuk was tried and convicted by a German criminal court of being an accessory to murder, but died before the German appellate court could hear his case, thereby voiding the conviction.

=== Defense of Arthur Rudolph ===
Following Buchanan's recommendation to reconsider the denaturalization of former Nazi and NASA scientist Arthur Rudolph, who had been brought to the United States as part of Operation Paperclip, Traficant spoke to the Friends of Arthur Rudolph, an organization based in Huntsville, Alabama. He argued that denaturalization had happened because of a "powerful Jewish lobby" influencing Congress. He added that it was a violation of a U.S. citizen's civil rights, and he suggested that Rudolph return to the United States nonetheless. Additionally, he "introduced a resolution in Congress [...] calling for an investigation into the OSI's handling of Rudolph's case." Meanwhile, in 1990, Traficant had planned to meet Rudolph at Niagara Falls, on the Canadian–American border, but Rudolph was arrested by immigration officials in Toronto, and the meeting never occurred.

=== Trial and expulsion ===
On May 4, 2001, Traficant was federally indicted for taking campaign funds for personal use. The charges against him included bribery, racketeering, and tax evasion. During the two-month trial, he again represented himself, insisting that this was the continuation of a vendetta which began with his 1983 trial. One of the men he was bribed by, John J. Cafaro, testified against him.

Traficant was convicted of ten of the charges on April 11, 2002, leading the House Ethics Committee to recommend that he be expelled from the House of Representatives. On July 24, this was agreed to by nearly the entire House. One member, Gary Condit, who was facing an unrelated scandal of his own, voted no. Nine members voted 'present', and four members did not vote. Traficant was only the second person to be expelled from Congress since the end of the Civil War; the first was Michael Myers, one of the many politicians involved in the Abscam scandal, in 1980.

On July 30, 2002, U.S. District Judge Lesley Wells sentenced Traficant to eight years in prison and fined him $150,000.

== Incarceration ==
Traficant entered the Federal Correctional Institution, Allenwood Low, on August 6, 2002, with the Federal Bureau of Prisons ID # 31213-060. He served his first seventeen months at Allenwood, being moved to the Federal Medical Center, Rochester in 2004. He claimed that he was put into solitary confinement shortly after his arrival at Allenwood for telling a guard, "People can't hear you. Speak up." He refused to meet visitors, saying that he did not want anyone to see him.

A few months into Traficant's incarceration, the 2002 midterm elections took place. Despite being ineligible for his seat in the House because he was being held in another state, he became one of the few American prisoners to seek federal office, running as an independent candidate. He received 28,045 votes, or 15 percent; the winner was Tim Ryan, a former aide.

While in prison, Traficant received support from neo-Nazi David Duke. Through his website, Duke urged people to donate on Traficant's behalf, and posted a letter from Traficant which claimed that he been targeted by the Department of Justice, in part for defending John Demjanjuk, and hinted at divulging information he knew about several American conspiracy theories. Michael Collins Piper, who wrote Target: Traficant, The Untold Story and helped to circulate Traficant's letter, noted that his writings about Traficant had been circulated far and wide online, and denied that Traficant had direct connections to Duke.

Traficant was freed on September 2, 2009, beginning three years of supervised release. On September 6, supporters held a banquet with a dress code mirroring his.

On November 2, 2009, Traficant wrote a column defending Demjanjuk in the American Free Press. In January 2010, he signed a limited, three-month contract, with permission to quit and run for office, to be a part-time weekend host for the Cleveland news/talk station WTAM.

== Later life and death ==
On September 12, 2009, Traficant spoke at a Tea Party protest in Columbiana, Ohio. In September 2010, he was certified to run for his former seat in the House; his plaform was repealing the Sixteenth Amendment. For a second time, he lost to Tim Ryan, receiving 30,556 votes, or 16%.

Traficant began a grassroots campaign in July 2014, Project Freedom USA, to, among other things, put pressure on Congress to get rid of the IRS and "divorce" the Federal Reserve. He continued to live on the farm in Greenford that he had purchased in 1987.

On September 23, 2014, Traficant drove his tractor into a pole barn on his farm. The tractor flipped over and landed on him, subjecting him to fatal positional asphyxia. On September 27, he died at a hospice in Poland, Ohio, aged 73. His body was buried in an undisclosed location after a private family funeral.

== Publications ==
- Piper, Michael Collins (2005). Target: Traficant, The Untold Story. American Free Press. ISBN 978-0981808611.
- Traficant, James (2011). America's Last Minuteman. New York: Sports Calendar International. ISBN 978-1-889036-01-4.

== See also ==
- 1960 Pittsburgh Panthers football team
- 1961 Pittsburgh Panthers football team
- 1962 Pittsburgh Panthers football team
- List of United States representatives from Ohio
- List of United States representatives expelled, censured, or reprimanded
- List of American federal politicians convicted of crimes
- List of federal political scandals in the United States

U.S. House of Representatives
Preceded by Lyle Williams	Member of the U.S. House of Representatives from Ohio's 17th congressional district 1985–2002	Succeeded by Tim Ryan
