= West Lafayette, Ohio =

- Village
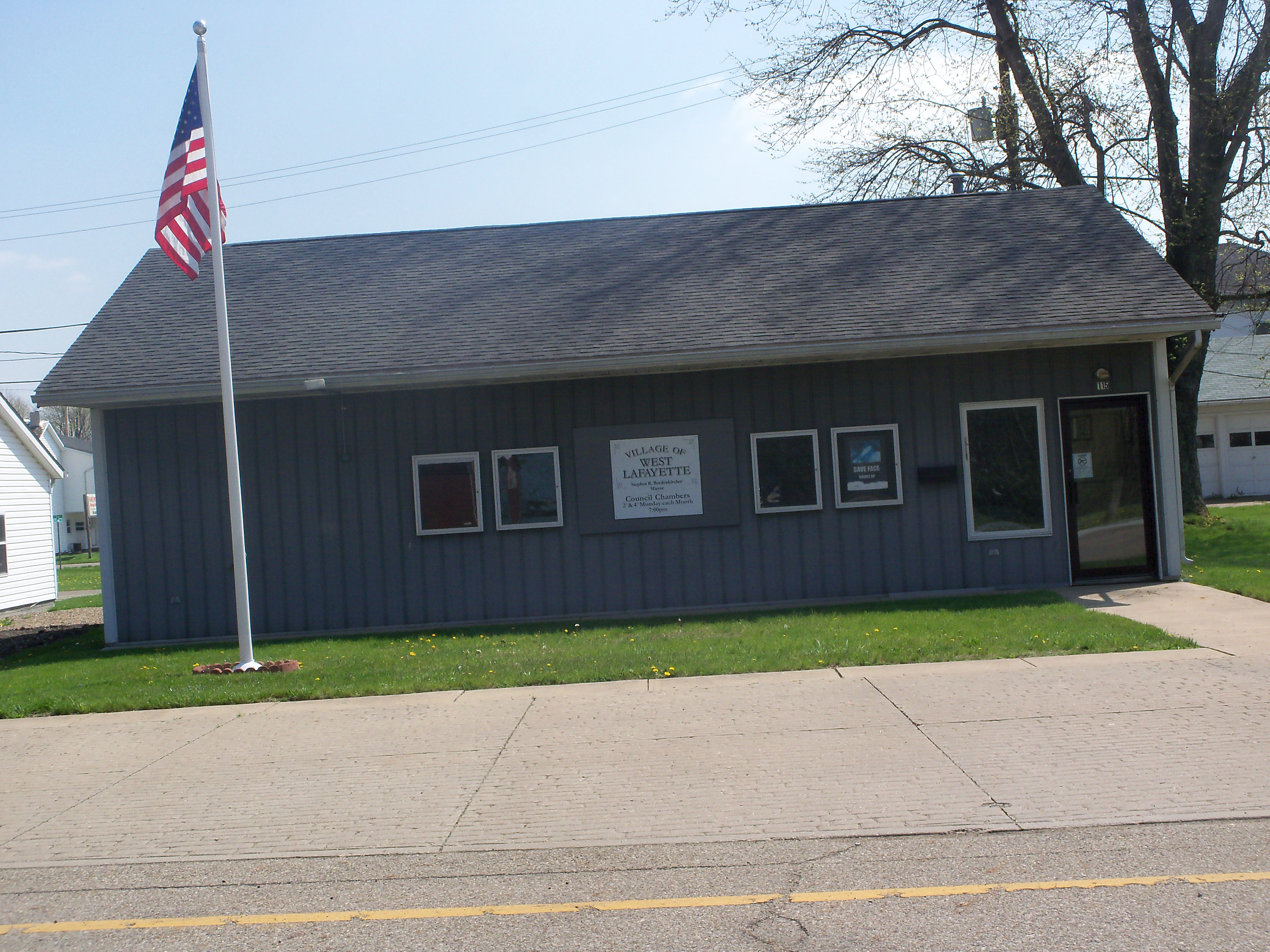
- Town Hall

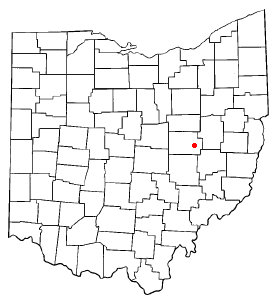
- Location of West Lafayette, Ohio

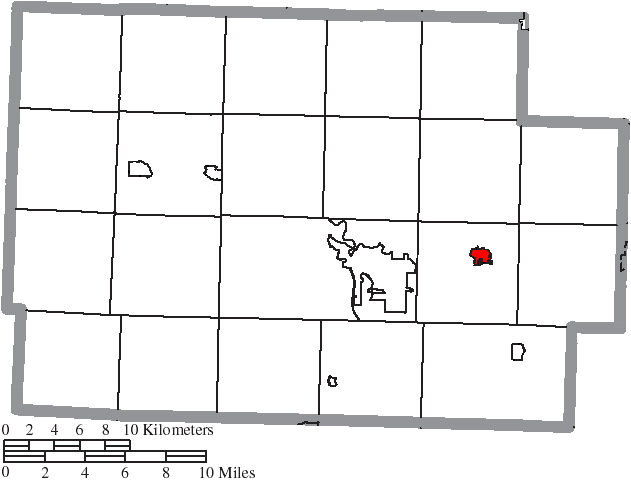
- Location of West Lafayette in Coshocton County
- Coordinates: 40°16′30″N 81°44′56″W
- Country: United States
- State: Ohio
- County: Coshocton
- Township: Lafayette
- Established: 2016

Area
  - Total: 0.86 sq mi (2.23 km^{2})
  - Land: 0.86 sq mi (2.23 km^{2})
  - Water: 0 sq mi (0.00 km^{2})
- Elevation: 804 ft (245 m)

Population (2020)
  - Total: 2,417
  - Density: 2,803.4/sq mi (1,082.38/km^{2})
- Time zone: UTC-5 (Eastern (EST))
  - Summer (DST): UTC-4 (EDT)
- ZIP code: 43845
- Area code: 740
- FIPS code: 39-83608
- GNIS feature ID: 2400133
- Website: http://www.westlafayettevillage.com/

West Lafayette is a village in Coshocton County, Ohio, United States. The population was 2,417 at the 2020 census.

== History ==
West Lafayette was laid out in 1850 by Robert Shaw and William Wheeler. In 1855, the Steubenville and Indiana Railroad was built through the new town. The line became known as the Panhandle Route and was operated in the Pennsylvania Railroad system and currently by the Columbus and Ohio River Railroad (Ohio Central Railroad System). Tragedy struck this track on September 11, 1950, when the crack passenger train "Spirit of St. Louis" hit another train carrying 600 men of the 109th Field Artillery Battalion of the Pennsylvania National Guard. 33 men were killed as a result of the accident. A memorial was placed near the site of the accident in 1990. A 105mm howitzer is at the memorial also, commemorating the manufacture of 105mm shells at Moore Enamelling across the tracks during WWII.

The village was once known as the "Enamel Center of the World". Before plastics were invented, steel vessels covered with a ceramic called enamelware were the norm in American homes. In 1903 the Lafayette Stamping and Enameling Co. was founded. Moore Enameling and Jones Metal also manufactured enamelware.

The West Lafayette Homecoming was founded in 1950 and continues today as the "Hometown Festival."

== Geography ==
According to the United States Census Bureau, the village has a total area of 0.89 square miles (2.31 km^{2}), all land.

The village is built upon a level plain in the Tuscarawas River valley and is surrounded by forested hills and agricultural valleys. The Ohio Central Railroad passes through the town. Immediately north of the village is U.S. Route 36. Both of these are major arteries connecting Columbus with points east.

The aquifer under the village is the site of a well documented trichloroethylene (TCE) plume.

== Demographics ==
Historical population
| Census | Pop. | Note | %± |
|---|---|---|---|
| 1880 | 250 | | — |
| 1910 | 840 | | — |
| 1920 | 921 | | 9.6% |
| 1930 | 1,106 | | 20.1% |
| 1940 | 1,152 | | 4.2% |
| 1950 | 1,346 | | 16.8% |
| 1960 | 1,476 | | 9.7% |
| 1970 | 1,719 | | 16.5% |
| 1980 | 2,225 | | 29.4% |
| 1990 | 2,129 | | −4.3% |
| 2000 | 2,313 | | 8.6% |
| 2010 | 2,321 | | 0.3% |
| 2020 | 2,417 | | 4.1% |
U.S. Decennial Census

=== 2010 census ===
As of the census of 2010, there were 2,321 people, 948 households, and 642 families living in the village. The population density was 2,607.9 inhabitants per square mile (1,006.9/km^{2}). There were 1,033 housing units at an average density of 1,160.7 per square mile (448.1/km^{2}). The racial makeup of the village was 99.0% White, 0.1% African American, 0.1% Asian, 0.1% from other races, and 0.6% from two or more races. Hispanic or Latino of any race were 0.6% of the population.

There were 948 households, of which 33.3% had children under the age of 18 living with them, 44.9% were married couples living together, 17.4% had a female householder with no husband present, 5.4% had a male householder with no wife present, and 32.3% were non-families. 27.1% of all households were made up of individuals, and 12.7% had someone living alone who was 65 years of age or older. The average household size was 2.38 and the average family size was 2.82.

The median age in the village was 39.1 years. 23.3% of residents were under the age of 18; 9.4% were between the ages of 18 and 24; 24.7% were from 25 to 44; 25.2% were from 45 to 64; and 17.4% were 65 years of age or older. The gender makeup of the village was 46.4% male and 53.6% female.

=== 2000 census ===
As of the census of 2000, there were 2,313 people, 909 households, and 616 families living in the village. The population density was 3,503.4 inhabitants per square mile (1,352.7/km^{2}). There were 990 housing units at an average density of 1,499.5 per square mile (579.0/km^{2}). The racial makeup of the village was 98.53% White, 0.22% African American, 0.09% Native American, 0.26% from other races, and 0.91% from two or more races. Hispanic or Latino of any race were 0.35% of the population.

There were 909 households, out of which 34.5% had children under the age of 18 living with them, 50.8% were married couples living together, 14.4% had a female householder with no husband present, and 32.2% were non-families. 27.4% of all households were made up of individuals, and 14.0% had someone living alone who was 65 years of age or older. The average household size was 2.46 and the average family size was 2.98.

In the village, the population was spread out, with 26.7% under the age of 18, 9.6% from 18 to 24, 27.8% from 25 to 44, 19.5% from 45 to 64, and 16.6% who were 65 years of age or older. The median age was 36 years. For every 100 females there were 89.4 males. For every 100 females age 18 and over, there were 81.2 males.

The median income for a household in the village was $29,870, and the median income for a family was $38,333. Males had a median income of $29,205 versus $20,341 for females. The per capita income for the village was $14,913. About 5.7% of families and 8.1% of the population were below the poverty line, including 9.6% of those under age 18 and 6.7% of those age 65 or over.

== Education ==
West Lafayette has a public library, a branch of the Coshocton Public Library.

The village is also home to the Ridgewood Local School district which accounts for the eastern half of the county and parts of surrounding counties. Ridgewood Local is a public K-12 district and has an elementary building (pre school - 3rd), a middle school (4-7) and a high school (8-12) more information can be found on the schools website at www.ridgewood.k12.oh.us

== Transportation ==
=== Airport ===
Tri-City Airport is a public use airport located two nautical miles (4 km) southeast of the central business district of West Lafayette.

== Notable people ==
- J. Harry McGregor, politician
- Madison Rayne, professional wrestler
