= List of islands by name (R) =

This article features a list of islands sorted by their name beginning with the letter R.

== R ==
Island's Name	Island group(s)	Country/Countries
Rab		Croatia
Rabbit	There are four Rabbit islands in NZ, the best known is in Tasman Bay	New Zealand
Rabbit	Lower Lough Erne	Ireland
Rabbit		Lebanon
Rabbit	Calcasieu Lake, Louisiana	United States
Rabbit	Georgian Bay, Ontario	Canada
Rabbit	Mississippi River, Mississippi	United States
Racoon	Louisiana	United States
Ragged	Lake Winnipesaukee, New Hampshire	United States
Ragged	Nunavut	Canada
Rakino	Hauraki Gulf	New Zealand
Raiatea	Windward Islands, Society Islands, French Polynesia	Overseas Lands of France
Rainsford	Boston Harbor, Massachusetts	United States
Rakahanga	Cook Islands	Cook Islands
Ram Island	Stonington, Connecticut	United States
Rambutyo	Admiralty Islands	Papua New Guinea
Ramea	Newfoundland and Labrador	Canada
Ramree		Myanmar
Ramshead	Lake Mead, Nevada	United States
Randall's	East River, New York	United States
Randolph	Grand Bay, New Brunswick	Canada
Random	Newfoundland and Labrador	Canada
Rangiroa	Palliser Islands, Tuamotus, French Polynesia	France
Rangitata	Rangitata River	New Zealand
Rangitoto	Hauraki Gulf	New Zealand
Raoul	Kermadec Islands	New Zealand
Raroia	Tuamotus, French Polynesia	France
Rarotonga	Cook Islands	Cook Islands
Raspberry	Mississippi River, Minnesota	United States
Raspberry	Kodiak Archipelago, Alaska	United States
Rat	Rat Islands group of the Aleutian Islands, Alaska	United States
Rat	City Island Harbor, New York	United States
Rathlin	Northern Ireland	United Kingdom
Rathlin O'Birne		Ireland
Rato	Estremadura islands	Portugal
Ile aux Rats	Cosmoledo atoll	Seychelles
Rattlesnake	Clear Lake, California	United States
Rattlesnake	Okanagan Lake, British Columbia	Canada
Rattlesnake	Lake Winnipesaukee, New Hampshire	United States
Ravenga	Banks Islands	Vanuatu
Île de Ré	Pertuis d'Antioche	France
Reao	Tuamotus, French Polynesia	France
Rearlaplap	Arno Atoll	Marshall Islands
Rebbenesøya	Karlsøy and Tromsø	Norway
Ile aux Récifs	Inner Islands	Seychelles
Reclaimed	Inner Islands	Seychelles
Red Rock	San Francisco Bay, California	United States
Redbud	Susquehanna River, Pennsylvania	United States
Redhead	Lake Winnipesaukee, New Hampshire	United States
Redman Point Bar	Mississippi River, Arkansas and Tennessee	United States
Redonda	Lesser Antilles	Antigua and Barbuda
Reedy	Delaware River, Delaware	United States
Reichenau	Lake Constance	Germany
Reindeer	Lake Winnipeg, Manitoba	Canada
Reinøya	Karlsøy and Tromsø	Norway
Rema	Lake Tana	Ethiopia
Rémire	Amirante Islands	Seychelles
Renaissance Island	Aruba	Kingdom of the Netherlands
René-Levasseur	Manicouagan Reservoir, Quebec	Canada
Rennell	Rennell and Bellona province, Solomon Islands	Solomon Islands
Rennesøy	Stavanger Municipality, Rogaland	Norway
Replotlandet	Ostrobothnia	Finland
Residence	St. Joseph's Atoll	Seychelles
Resolution	Nunavut	Canada
Resolution		New Zealand
Resource Island	St. Joseph's Atoll	Seychelles
Réunion Island	Réunion	France
Revillagigedo	Alexander Archipelago, Alaska	United States
Rharbi	Kerkenna Islands	Tunisia
Rhineia	Cyclades	Greece
Rhodes	Dodecanese	Greece
Rice	Lost Lake, Louisiana	United States
Rikers	Upper East River, New York	United States
Rincah		Indonesia
Ringvassøya	Karlsøy and Tromsø	Norway
Ripapa	Lyttelton Harbour	New Zealand
Roaninish	County Donegal	Ireland
Roanoke	Outer Banks, North Carolina	United States
Roastbeef		Namibia
Robben	Table Bay	South Africa
Robert	South Shetland Islands	Claimed by: Argentine Antarctica, Argentina, Antártica Chilena Province of Chile, and British Antarctic Territory of theUnited Kingdom
Isla Robertson	South Orkney Islands	Claimed by the:United Kingdom as part of the Falkland Islands and by Argentina
Robertson	Cumberland River, Tennessee	United States
Robertson	Tygart Valley River, West Virginia	United States
Robins	Peconic Bay, New York	United States
Robinson Crusoe	Juan Fernández Islands	Chile
Roche Babri	Inner Islands	Seychelles
Roche Bouquet	Inner Islands	Seychelles
Roche Canon	Inner Islands	Seychelles
Roche Du Sud	Inner Islands	Seychelles
Roche Grande Maman	Inner Islands	Seychelles
Roche Tortue	Inner Islands	Seychelles
Rocher Des Oiseaux		Mauritius
Ile Roches		Mauritius
Rock	Willamette River, Oregon	United States
Rock	Green Bay, Wisconsin	United States
Rockabill		Ireland
Rockall	North Atlantic	United Kingdom
Roderick	British Columbia	Canada
Roi-Namur	Kwajalein Atoll, Ralik Chain	Marshall Islands
Ilhéu das Rólas	Gulf of Guinea	São Tomé and Príncipe
Rolvsøya		
Rømø	North Sea	Denmark
Romsø	Great Belt	Denmark
Ronde		Grenada
Île Ronde		Mauritius
Île Ronde	Amqui, Quebec	Canada
Île Ronde	Beauceville, Quebec	Canada
Île Ronde (Île du Docteur)	Beauharnois, Quebec	Canada
Île Ronde	roadstead of Brest, Brittany	France
Île Ronde	Contrecœur, Quebec	Canada
Île Ronde	Dundee, Quebec	Canada
Île Ronde	Grand-Remous, Quebec	Canada
Île Ronde	Gros-Mécatina, Quebec	Canada
Île de la Ronde (Île Tekakwitha)	Kahnawake, Quebec	Canada
Île Ronde	La Pêche, Quebec	Canada
Île Ronde	La Tuque, Quebec	Canada
Île Ronde	Lac-Casault, Quebec	Canada
Île Ronde	Lac-Tremblant-Nord, Quebec	Canada
Île Ronde	Léry, Quebec	Canada
Île Ronde	L′Isle-Verte, Quebec	Canada
Île Ronde	Mont-Laurier, Quebec	Canada
Île Ronde	Mont Saint-Michel, Quebec	Canada
Île Ronde	Notre-Dame-de-Pontmain, Quebec	Canada
Île Ronde	Potton, Quebec	Canada
Île Ronde	Preissac, Quebec	Canada
Île Ronde	Rimouski, Quebec	Canada
Île Ronde (Île Brûlée)	Rimouski, Quebec	Canada
Île Ronde	Îles Laval, Rivière des Prairies, Quebec	Canada
Île Ronde	Rouyn-Noranda, Quebec	Canada
Île Ronde	Saint-Antoine-de-l′Isle-aux-Grues, Quebec	Canada
Île Ronde	Saint-Boniface, Quebec	Canada
Île Ronde	Saint-François-du-Lac, Quebec	Canada
Île Ronde	Saint-Henri-de-Taillon, Quebec	Canada
Île Ronde	Saint-Hippolyte, Quebec	Canada
Île Ronde	Saint-Ignace-de-Loyola, Quebec	Canada
Île Ronde	Saint-Lucien, Quebec	Canada
Île Ronde	Saint-Paul-de-l′Île-aux-Noix, Quebec	Canada
Île Ronde	Saint-Roch-de-Mékinac, Quebec	Canada
Île Ronde	Saint-Sulpice, Quebec	Canada
Île Ronde	Sainte-Thérèse-de-la-Gatineau, Quebec	Canada
Île Ronde	Senneterre, Quebec	Canada
Île Ronde	Inner Islands	Seychelles
Île Ronde (Île Chapdelaine)	Shawinigan, Quebec	Canada
Île Ronde	Val-Brillant, Quebec	Canada
Île Ronde	Vaudreuil-Dorion, Quebec	Canada
Île Ronde (Île Bray)	Vaudreuil-Dorion, Quebec	Canada
Rondeau	Ohio River, Kentucky	United States
Rongelap Atoll	Ralik Chain	Marshall Islands
Rongerik Atoll	Kwajalein Atoll, Ralik Chain	Marshall Islands
Roosevelt	East River, New York	United States
Rose	Georgian Bay, Ontario	Canada
Ross		Antarctica
Ross	Willamette River, Oregon	United States
Ross	Allegheny River, Pennsylvania	United States
Rosscor	Lower Lough Erne	Ireland
Røstlandet	Lofoten	Norway
Rostam	Persian Gulf	Iran
R. Thompson's	Allegheny River, Pennsylvania	United States
Rotoroa	Hauraki Gulf	New Zealand
Rottumeroog	Eemsmond, Groningen	Netherlands
Rottumerplaat	Eemsmond, Groningen	Netherlands
Rotuma		Fiji
Rough	Lower Lough Erne	Ireland
Rough	Solway Firth	Scotland
Round	Krenitzin Islands subgroup of the Fox Islands group of the Aleutian Islands, Alaska	United States
Round	Coast Land District, British Columbia	Canada
Round	Lillooet Land District, British Columbia	Canada
Round	Nanaimo Land District, British Columbia	Canada
Round	Rupert Land District, British Columbia	Canada
Round	Dorset	United Kingdom
Round (Pak Sha Chau, 白沙洲)	North District, Hong Kong	China
Round (Ngan Chau, 銀洲)	Southern District, Hong Kong	China
Round	Manitoba	Canada
Round (a.k.a. Bumpkin)	Massachusetts	United States
Round	Maryland	United States
Round	Straits of Mackinac, Michigan	United States
Round	Detroit River, Michigan	United States
Round	Mississippi Sound, Mississippi	United States
Round	New Brunswick	Canada
Round	Lake Winnipesaukee, New Hampshire	United States
Round	Newfoundland and Labrador	Canada
Round	Nova Scotia	Canada
Round	Coutts Inlet, Baffin Bay, Nunavut	Canada
Round	Cross Bay, Chesterfield Inlet, Nunavut	Canada
Round	Buckeye Lake, Fairfield County, Ohio	United States
Round	Algoma, Ontario	Canada
Round	Frontenac, Ontario	Canada
Round	Kenora, Ontario	Canada
Round	Lanark, Ontario	Canada
Round	Leeds, Ontario	Canada
Round	Lennox and Addington, Ontario	Canada
Round	Parry Sound, Ontario	Canada
Round	Sudbury, Ontario	Canada
Round	Thunder Bay, Ontario	Canada
Round	Frankland Islands, Queensland	Australia
Round	Hogan Group, northern Bass Strait, Tasmania	Australia
Round Bottle	Newfoundland and Labrador	Canada
Round Head	Newfoundland and Labrador	Canada
Round Rocks	Nunavut	Canada
Round Shag	Newfoundland and Labrador	Canada
Round Wolf	Newfoundland and Labrador	Canada
Rousay	The North Isles, Orkney Islands	Scotland
Rowa	Banks Islands	Vanuatu
Rowett	South Shetland Islands	Claimed by Argentine Antarctica, Argentina, Antártica Chilena Province of Chile, and British Antarctic Territory of theUnited Kingdom
Rowley	Queen Elizabeth Islands, Nunavut	Canada
Isle Royale	Lake Superior, Michigan	United States
Rozenburg	South Holland	Netherlands
Ruapuke		New Zealand
Rubud Al Gharbiyah	Hawar Islands	Bahrain
Rubud Al Sharqiyah	Hawar Islands	Bahrain
Ruden	Mecklenburg-Vorpommern	Germany
Rudolf Island	Franz Josef Land	Russia
Rügen	Mecklenburg-Vorpommern	Germany
Rugged	South Shetland Islands	Claimed by Argentine Antarctica, Argentina, Antártica Chilena Province of Chile, and British Antarctic Territory of theUnited Kingdom
Ruhnu	Gulf of Riga	Estonia
Rùm	Small Isles of the Inner Hebrides	Scotland
Rush	Mississippi River, Iowa	United States
Rusk Holm	The North Isles, Orkney Islands	Scotland
Russell	Lake Huron Ontario	Canada
Russel	Nunavut	Canada
Russel	St. Clair River, Michigan	United States
Russell	Frankland Group National Park, Queensland	Australia
Russell	Southern Moreton Bay Islands, Queensland	Australia
Ruxton	De Courcy Islands Group, Canada	Canada
Rysa Little	The South Isles,Orkney Islands	Scotland
