= Round Island =

Round Island or île Ronde may refer to:

== Australia ==
- Round Island (Queensland), Frankland Islands
- Round Island (Tasmania), Hogan Group, northern Bass Strait

== Canada ==
- Round Island, Nova Scotia
- Round Island (Nunavut) (two: Coutts Inlet, Baffin Bay, and Cross Bay, Chesterfield Inlet; there is also a Round Rocks Island)
- Île Ronde (Îles Laval), in the Rivière des Prairies, Quebec

== China ==
- Robert Island (Paracel Islands), also known as Round Island, occupied by China (PRC) and also claimed by Taiwan (ROC) and Vietnam

== France ==
- île Ronde, Brest, in the roadstead of Brest

== Hong Kong ==
- Round Island or Pak Sha Chau (白沙洲), in North District
- Round Island, Hong Kong or Ngan Chau (銀洲), in Southern District

== Mauritius ==
- île Ronde, Mauritius, an islet on the coast of Mauritius
- Bolyeriidae, also known as the Round Island boas
- Round Island day gecko

== New Zealand ==
- Round Island (Bay of Islands)

== Seychelles ==
- Round Island, Mahé
- Round Island, Praslin

== United Kingdom ==
- Round Island (Dorset)
- Round Island, County Down, a townland in County Down, Northern Ireland
- Round Island, County Fermanagh, a townland in County Fermanagh, Northern Ireland
- Round Island, Isles of Scilly, the location of Round Island Light, Cornwall

== United States ==
- Round Island (Aleutian Islands), Alaska
- Round Island (Nanticoke River) in Maryland; see List of islands of Maryland
- Bumpkin Island, Massachusetts, also known as Round Island
- Round Island (Michigan)
- Round Island Light (Michigan), a lighthouse on the above island
- Round Island (Detroit River), a different island in southeast Michigan
- Round Island (Mississippi)
- Iona Island (New York), part of which is known as Round Island
- Round Island, in Lake Bonaparte (New York)
- Round Island (Ohio), located within Buckeye Lake, Fairfield County

== See also ==
- Ronde Island, Grenada
- List of islands by name (R)
