= Buckeye Lake (disambiguation) =

Buckeye Lake, Ohio, is a village in the US.

Buckeye Lake may also refer to:

- Buckeye Lake (Ohio), a reservoir, for which the village is named
  - Buckeye Lake State Park
  - Buckeye Lake Music Center, now Legend Valley, an outdoor concert venue in Thornville, Ohio
- Buckeye Lake (Oregon), a lake in the Rogue–Umpqua Divide Wilderness
- Lake Buckeye, a natural freshwater lake in Winter Haven, Florida
