= Harbor Hills, Ohio =

- Census-designated place
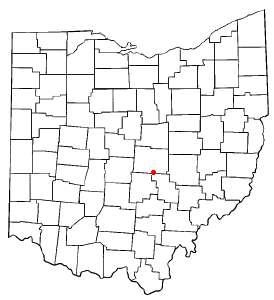
- Location of Harbor Hills, Ohio
- Coordinates: 39°56′12″N 82°26′07″W
- Country: United States
- State: Ohio
- County: Licking
- Township: Licking

Area
  - Total: 3.48 sq mi (9.02 km^{2})
  - Land: 2.76 sq mi (7.14 km^{2})
  - Water: 0.73 sq mi (1.89 km^{2})
- Elevation: 929 ft (283 m)

Population (2020)
  - Total: 1,565
  - Density: 568.1/sq mi (219.33/km^{2})
- Time zone: UTC-5 (Eastern (EST))
  - Summer (DST): UTC-4 (EDT)
- FIPS code: 39-33362
- GNIS feature ID: 1867456

Harbor Hills is a census-designated place (CDP) in southern Licking County, Ohio, United States. The population was 1,565 at the 2020 census.

A post office called Harbor Hills was established in 1927, and remained in operation until 1943.

== Geography ==
Harbor Hills is located in southern Licking County on the north and northeast sides of Buckeye Lake. The CDP is in the southern part of Licking Township and is bordered to the west by the village of Buckeye Lake in Union Township of Licking County, and to the south by Thornport in Perry County. Interstate 70 forms the northern edge of the CDP, and Ohio State Route 13 forms the eastern edge. The neighborhood of Harbor Hills is in the western part of the CDP, while Edgewater Beach is in the southeast corner of the CDP. Both neighborhoods have shorefront on Buckeye Lake.

From State Route 13, Interstate 70 leads west 32 miles (51 km) to Columbus and east 21 miles (34 km) to Zanesville, while State Route 13 leads north 8 miles (13 km) to Newark, the Licking county seat, and southeast 13 miles (21 km) to Somerset.

According to the United States Census Bureau, the Harbor Hills CDP has a total area of 3.5 square miles (9.0 km^{2}), of which 2.7 square miles (7.1 km^{2}) are land and 0.73 square miles (1.9 km^{2}), or 20.94%, are water. The water area is part of Buckeye Lake, a reservoir constructed in the 19th century as part of the Ohio and Erie Canal project, but is now primarily used for recreation.

== Demographics ==
Historical population
Census	Pop.	Note	%±
2020	1,565		—
U.S. Decennial Census

As of the census of 2000, there were 1,303 people, 575 households, and 411 families living in the CDP. The population density was 478.1 inhabitants per square mile (184.6/km^{2}). There were 676 housing units at an average density of 248.0 per square mile (95.8/km^{2}). The racial makeup of the CDP was 98.39% White, 0.15% African American, 0.15% Asian, 0.15% Pacific Islander, and 1.15% from two or more races. Hispanic or Latino of any race were 0.15% of the population.

There were 575 households, out of which 19.8% had children under the age of 18 living with them, 63.1% were married couples living together, 5.7% had a female householder with no husband present, and 28.5% were non-families. 22.8% of all households were made up of individuals, and 10.1% had someone living alone who was 65 years of age or older. The average household size was 2.27 and the average family size was 2.66.

In the CDP the population was spread out, with 16.4% under the age of 18, 6.9% from 18 to 24, 22.3% from 25 to 44, 35.1% from 45 to 64, and 19.3% who were 65 years of age or older. The median age was 48 years. For every 100 females there were 101.4 males. For every 100 females age 18 and over, there were 101.7 males.

The median income for a household in the CDP was $48,510, and the median income for a family was $51,429. Males had a median income of $43,594 versus $27,361 for females. The per capita income for the CDP was $26,095. About 2.1% of families and 2.4% of the population were below the poverty line, including none of those under age 18 and 5.2% of those age 65 or over.
