= Harbor Hills =

Harbor Hills can refer to:

- Harbor Hills, New York
- Harbor Hills, Ohio
