= Pak Sha Chau =

Pak Sha Chau (Chinese: 白沙洲; pinyin: Báishā Zhōu) is the name of two islands off Hong Kong:

- Pak Sha Chau (North District), or Round Island, in the North District
- Pak Sha Chau (Sai Kung District), or White Sand Island, in the Sai Kung District
