= Margaret Brock =

Margaret Brock may refer to:

- Margaret Brock (1848), a sailing vessel wrecked in 1852 off the coast of South Australia
- Margaret Brock Reef, a reef in South Australia, named after the ship

== See also ==
- Margaret Susan Brock (1948–2023), Australian historian
