= Ajeltokrok =

Ajeltokrok Ajālto-rōk
- Island
- Interactive map of Ajeltokrok
- Coordinates: 6°59′N 171°41′E
- Country: Marshall Islands
- District: Arno Atoll
- Largest Village: Ine (pop 246)

Area
  - Total: 3.682 km^{2} (1.422 sq mi)

Dimensions
  - Length: 26 km (16 mi)
  - Width: 0.2 km (0.12 mi)

Population (2014)
  - Total: 460
  - Density: 120/km^{2} (320/sq mi)

Ajeltokrok (Marshallese: Ajālto-rōk, [ɑzʲæltˠoːrˠɤk]) is one of the most populous islands in the Arno Atoll with a population of 460, in these four villages :

- Ine 246 (west part)
- Kinajon 10 (lonely houses along the road between Ine and Lukoj)
- Lukoj 100
- Japo 104 (east part)

Ajeltokrok It is part of the Marshall Islands in the Pacific Ocean. In Ine there is now an artificial bridge made to connect it to Kobjeltak. There is no plan in the future to connect Japo to Autlep Island in the west, because Autlep is almost uninhabited (population of 3). Ajeltokrok has a road with a length of about 26 km, that connects Ine and Japo. The average width of the island is 0.2 km.

== See also ==
- Desert island
- List of islands
