= Arno Atoll =

Atoll of the Marshall Islands

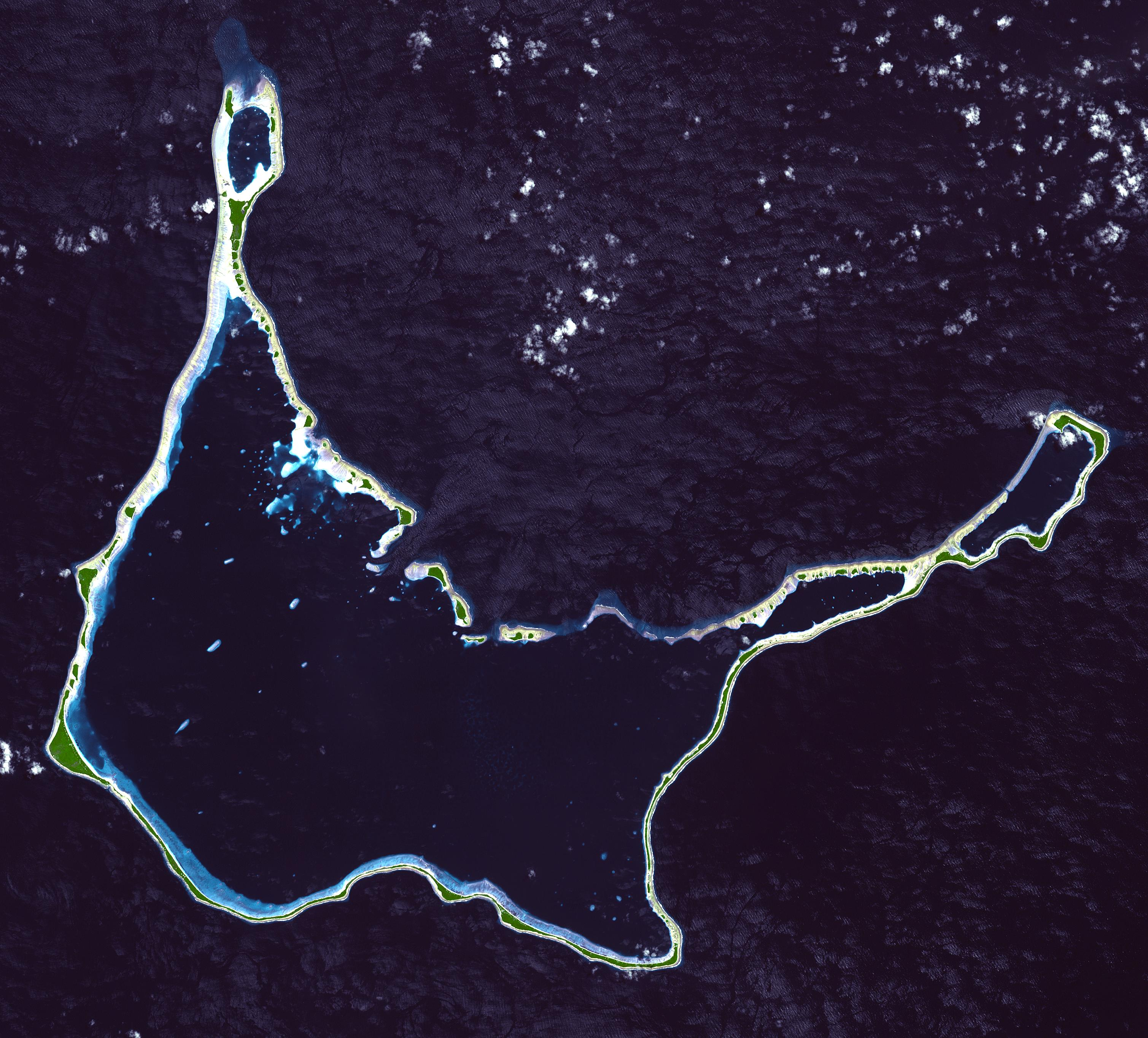
- NASA picture of Arno Atoll

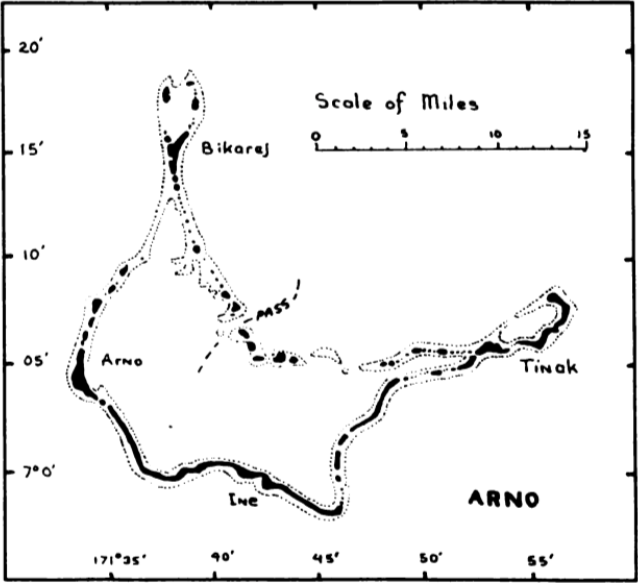
- Map of Arno Atoll

- Location in the Marshall Islands

Geography
- Location: North Pacific
- Coordinates: 7°05′N 171°42′E
- Archipelago: Ratak
- Total islands: 133
- Area: 13.0 km^{2} (5.0 sq mi)
- Highest elevation: 3 m (10 ft)

Administration
- Marshall Islands

Demographics
- Population: 1,141 (2021)
- Ethnic groups: Marshallese

Flag of Arno Atoll

Arno Atoll (Marshallese: Arņo, [ɑnnˠɔ]) is a coral atoll of 133 islands in the Pacific Ocean, and forms a legislative district of the Ratak Chain of the Marshall Islands. Its total land area is only 5 square miles (13 km^{2}). Unlike most other atolls, Arno encloses three different lagoons, a large central one, and two smaller ones in the north and east. Its main lagoon encloses an area of 130.77 square miles (338.7 km^{2}). At a distance of only 20 kilometers (12 mi), it is the closest atoll to the Marshall Islands capital, Majuro Atoll, and can be seen looking east from Majuro on a clear day at low tide. The population of Arno Atoll was 1,141 at the 2021 census. The most populous islets are Ajeltokrok, Kobjeltak, Rearlaplap, Langor and Tutu. The largest village is Ine, Arno.

People of Arno are well known for their productivity in making copra (the dried out meat of coconuts, from which coconut oil is extracted). Arno women are renowned for their production of the Kili Bag, a popular handwoven handbag/purse, named after another island in the Marshall Islands (to which the people of Bikini were eventually relocated as a result of the US nuclear tests that were conducted on their home atoll). Arno supposedly had a traditional "love school".

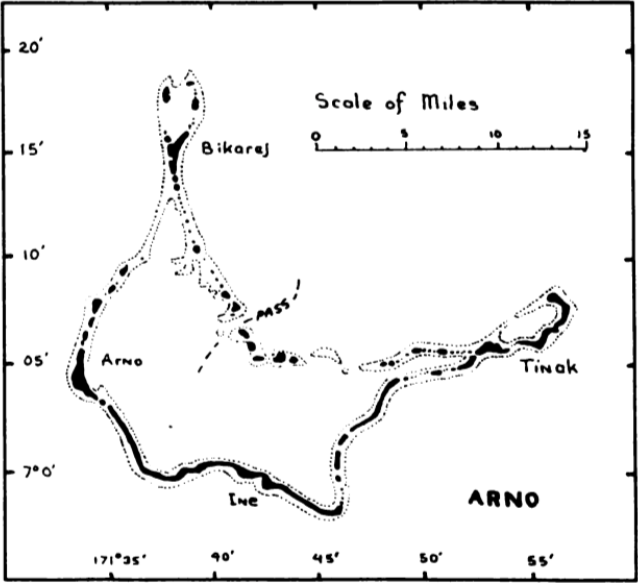

== History ==
Arno Atoll was claimed by the German Empire along with the rest of the Marshall Islands in 1885. After World War I, the island came under the South Seas Mandate of the Empire of Japan. Following the end of World War II, Arno Atoll came under the control of the United States as part of the Trust Territory of the Pacific Islands. The island has been part of the independent Republic of the Marshall Islands since 1986.

== Education ==
Marshall Islands Public School System operates public schools:

- Arno Elementary School
- Bikarej Elementary School
- Ine Elementary School
- Jabo Elementary School
- Kilange Elementary School
- Longar Elementary School
- Lukoj Elementary School
- Matolen Elementary School
- Tinak Elementary School
- Tutu Elementary School
- Ulien Elementary School

Marshall Islands High School on Majuro serves the community.
