= List of shipwrecks in November 1852 =

List of shipwrecks in November 1852 includes ships sunk, foundered, wrecked, grounded, or otherwise lost during November 1852.

== 1 November ==
List of shipwrecks: 1 November 1852
Ship	State	Description
Brothers and Sisters	United Kingdom	The ship was wrecked 10 nautical miles (19 km) north of Cimbritshamn, Sweden with the loss of three of her crew. She was on a voyage from Königsberg, Prussia to an English port.

== 2 November ==
List of shipwrecks: 2 November 1852
Ship	State	Description
Contractor	United Kingdom	The ship sailed from Demerara, British Guiana for London. No further trace, presumed foundered with the loss of all hands.
Herstelling	Netherlands	The galiot was lost in the North Sea off Flamborough Head, Yorkshire, United Kingdom. Her crew were rescued by Eliza Watson (United Kingdom).
Hero	United Kingdom	The ship was driven ashore on Hogland, Russia. She was on a voyage from Saint Petersburg, Russia to Dundee, Forfarshire. She floated off on 13 November and sank.
Louisa	Stettin	The ship was wrecked near Seaton Carew, County Durham, United Kingdom.
Lychan	Sweden	The schooner was wrecked in the Wester Guaken. Her crew were rescued. She was on a voyage from Stockholm to "Lekea".
Marie	United Kingdom	The ship foundered in the Atlantic Ocean. Her crew were rescued. She was on a voyage from Galaţi, Ottoman Empire to Queenstown, County Cork.
Mary	United Kingdom	The ship was driven ashore at "Wiken", Sweden. She was on a voyage from Newcastle upon Tyne. Northumberland to Danzig.
Souvenir	France	The ship was wrecked on Molène, Finistère. Her crew were rescued. She was on a voyage from Vila Nova de Portimão, Portugal to Dunkirk, Nord.

== 3 November ==
List of shipwrecks: November 1852
Ship	State	Description
Adder	Prussia	The ship ran aground at Peterhead, Aberdeenshire, United Kingdom. She was on a voyage from Memel to Hull, Yorkshire, United Kingdom.
Alexander	Russia	The ship was wrecked at Copenhagen, Denmark.
Anna	Duchy of Holstein	The ship was driven ashore at "Lest". She was on a voyage from "Hoyer" to Antwerp, Belgium. She was refloated and taken in to Sylt for repairs.
Harmonie	United Kingdom	The ship sank in the Baltic Sea off the "Hangoruld Lighthouse" with the loss of all but one of those on board. She was on a voyage from Newcastle upon Tyne, Northumberland to Reval, Russia.
Olivera Segunda	Portugal	The ship was driven ashore at "Bremshausen". She was on a voyage from Portugal to Hamburg.
Ptolomey (Птоломей, 'Ptolemy')	Imperial Russian Navy	The brig was driven ashore on the Island of Tendra in the Black Sea. Her crew were rescued. She was on a voyage from Sevastopol to Odesa.
Triton	Kingdom of Hanover	The ship was driven ashore at Newburgh, Fife, United Kingdom. Her crew were rescued.

== 4 November ==
List of shipwrecks: 4 November 1852
Ship	State	Description
Bertha	Hamburg	The ship was driven ashore on Sylt, Duchy of Holstein. She was on a voyage from Hamburg to London, United Kingdom.
Dorothy and Alice	United Kingdom	The ship was driven ashore south of Helsingborg, Sweden. She was on a voyage from Saint Petersburg, Russia to London. She was refloated and put in to Helsingør, Denmark.
Pfeil	Stettin	The ship was lost whilst on a voyage from Riga, Russia to Stettin.
Swallow	United Kingdom	The ship was driven ashore at Aigues-Mortes, Gard, France. She was on a voyage from London to Marseille, Bouches-du-Rhône, France.

== 5 November ==
List of shipwrecks: 5 November 1852
Ship	State	Description
Albion	United Kingdom	The ship was driven ashore at Littleferry, Sutherland. She was on a voyage from Newcastle upon Tyne, Northumberland to Golspie, Sutherland.
Alexander Brandt	Kingdom of Hanover	The ship was driven ashore and wrecked at "Norre Lynvig", Denmark. She was on a voyage from London, United Kingdom to Varel.
Ann	United Kingdom	The ship was in collision with another vessel in the River Thames and was consequently beached at Coalhouse Point, Essex.
Canada	United Kingdom	The brig ran aground on the Nidingen Reef, in the Baltic Sea. Her crew were rescued. She was on a voyage from Memel, Prussia to London. She was refloated on 24 November and taken in to Gothenburg, Sweden.
Catherina	Sweden	The brig was driven ashore and wrecked on Eierland, North Holland, Netherlands. Her crew were rescued. She was on a voyage from Sundsvall to Genoa, Kingdom of Sardinia.
Elizabeth	United Kingdom	The ship was driven ashore at Lindisfarne, Northumberland. She was on a voyage from Leith, Lothian to Grimsby, Lincolnshire. She was refloated on 22 November and towed in to Berwick upon Tweed, Northumberland for repairs.
Elizabeth and Ann	United Kingdom	The sloop was wrecked on the Ant Sand, in The Wash. All on board were rescued. She was on a voyage from East Stockwith, Lincolnshire to King's Lynn, Norfolk.
Harmonie	Norway	The galiot was driven ashore near Bergen. She was on a voyage from Cádiz, Spain to Stavanger. She was refloated and beached at Bergen.
Horn	United Kingdom	The ship was driven ashore south of St Andrews, Fife. She was on a voyage from the Davis Strait to Dundee, Forfarshire. She broke up on 9 November.
Irvine	United Kingdom	The ship was driven ashore at Ramsey, Isle of Man. She was on a voyage from Ardrossan, Ayrshire to Liverpool, Lancashire.
Jane	United Kingdom	The brig was wrecked in Newark Bay, Orkney Islands Her crew survived. She was on a voyage from Kronstadt, Russia to Greenock, Renfrewshire.
Johanna Jacobine	Denmark	The ship struck the pier at Grenaa and was wrecked. She was on a voyage from Grenaa to Drammen, Norway.
North Star	United Kingdom	The ship was driven ashore at Blakeney, Norfolk. She was on a voyage from Newcastle upon Tyne, Northumberland to London. She was refloated the next day and taken in to Great Yarmouth, Norfolk in a leaky condition.
Ocean Queen	United States	The ship collided with Crescent City (United States) in the Mississippi River and was severely damaged. she was on a voyage from New Orleans, Louisiana to Liverpool.
Oceanus	Kingdom of Hanover	The ship was driven ashore 7 nautical miles (13 km) from Liebau, Kingdom of Prussia. She was on a voyage from Flensburg to Memel, Prussia.
Ravenswood	United Kingdom	The ship was driven ashore on Catalinta Island, Dominican Republic. She was on a voyage from Liverpool to Saint Domingo.
Savalay	United Kingdom	The ship was driven ashore near Aigues-Mortes, Gard, France.
Sussex	United Kingdom	The ship was driven ashore at Cardigan. She was on a voyage from Runcorn, Cheshire to Cardiff, Glamorgan.

== 6 November ==
List of shipwrecks: 6 November 1852
Ship	State	Description
Albion	United Kingdom	The ship ran aground and sank at Littleferry, Sutherland. Her crew were rescued. She was on a voyage from Newcastle upon Tyne, Northumberland to Golspie, Sutherland.
Bertha	Prussia	The ship was wrecked near Lyngør, Norway. She was on a voyage from Wolgast to Goole, Yorkshire, United Kingdom.
Fairy	(United Kingdom of Great Britain and Ireland) British North America	The ship was driven ashore at Perche, Province of Canada. Her crew were rescued. She was on a voyage from Cape Celle to Gaspé, Province of Canada.
Freundschaft	(Denmark) Duchy of Scleswig	The ship ran aground on the Cross Sand, in the North Sea off the coast of Norfolk, United Kingdom. She was on a voyage from Rostock to London, United Kingdom. She was refloated and taken in to Great Yarmouth, Norfolk in a leaky condition.
Gerdina Cornelia	Kingdom of Hanover	The ship was driven ashore. She was refloated and put in to Copenhagen, Denmark.
Hiram	United Kingdom	The ship was driven ashore at "Hammo". Her crew were rescued.
Instow	United Kingdom	The smack was driven ashore at the Mumbles, Glamorgan.
Sussex	United Kingdom	The smack was wrecked at Cardigan. She was on a voyage from Runcorn, Cheshire to Cardiff, Glamorgan.

== 7 November ==
List of shipwrecks: 7 November 1852
Ship	State	Description
Flora	Chile	The barque was driven ashore near Huasco.
Johannes	Norway	The ship was driven ashore near Fjällbacka, Sweden. She was on a voyage from a Norwegian port to Antwerp, Belgium. She was refloated and taken in to "Floron" in a wrecked condition.
Julius und Carl	Hamburg	The ship was driven ashore near Falsterbo, Sweden. She was on a voyage from Kronstadt, Russia to London, United Kingdom.
Louisa and Gregoria	Austrian Empire	The barque was driven ashore and wrecked at Cranfield Point. County Down, United Kingdom. Her crew were rescued. She was on a voyage from Brăila, Ottoman Empire to Newry, County Antrim, United Kingdom.
Princess Royal	United Kingdom	The ship was driven ashore and wrecked on the Cefn Sidan Sands. Her crew were rescued. She was on a voyage from Queenstown, County Cork to Cardiff, Glamorgan.
Susannah	United Kingdom	The ship was wrecked on the "Norep Tange". Her crew were rescued. She was on a voyage from Danzig to London.
Voyager	United Kingdom	The schooner ran aground on the Brake Sand, in the North Sea and sank. Her crew were rescued. She was on a voyage from Rotterdam, South Holland to Poole, Dorset.

== 8 November ==
List of shipwrecks: 8 November 1852
Ship	State	Description
Eliza Goddard	United States	The ship was driven ashore at Ram's Head, Massachusetts. She was on a voyage from Saint John, New Brunswick, British North America to Boston, Massachusetts.
Elsiena	Prussia	The ship sprang a leak and was beached at Kalmar, Sweden. She was on a voyage from Memel to Bordeaux, Gironde, France.
Immanuel	Flag unknown	The ship was abandoned in the North Sea. Her crew were rescued.
John Munn	United Kingdom	The steamship ran aground on the Klein Vogel Sand and broke in two. She was on a voyage from Hartlepool, County Durham to Hamburg.
Louisa	Austrian Empire	The brig was driven ashore and wrecked in the Carlingford Lough. Her crew were rescued.
Louise Nicoline	Denmark	The ship was driven ashore at Hjørting. She was on a voyage from Hull, Yorkshire, United Kingdom to Ribe.
Richmond	United States	The ship ran aground on the Horse Shoe Shoal. She was on a voyage from Saint John, New Brunswick to New Bedford, Massachusetts. She was refloated on 10 November and arrived at New Bedford the next day.
Royal William	United Kingdom	The ship was driven ashore at Hasle, Bornholm, Denmark. Her crew were rescued. She was on a voyage from Saint Petersburg, Russia to Hull.
Scotia	United Kingdom	The brig was wrecked on Öland, Sweden. She was on a voyage from Riga, Russia to Londonderry.
Victoria	United Kingdom	The ship ran aground on the Kentish Knock. She was refloated and put in to Lowestoft, Suffolk in a leaky condition.
Zulima	Norway	The ship was lost "off the Kostersekeeren". Her crew were rescued. She was on a voyage from Cádiz, Spain to Bergen.

== 9 November ==
List of shipwrecks: 9 November 1852
Ship	State	Description
Atalanta	United Kingdom	The ship struck a sunken rock in Mount's Bay and was damaged. She was on a voyage from Bahia, Brazil to Antwerp, Belgium. She put in to Falmouth, Cornwall and was beached.
Ceres	United Kingdom	The ship was wrecked at Aldeburgh, Suffolk.
Elfrida	Sweden	The ship was driven ashore and wrecked on "Ungsbar". She was on a voyage from Ystad to Stockholm.
Elizabeth Maria	Netherlands	The ship ran aground on the Wittetonsrug. She was on a voyage from a Norwegian port to Harlingen, Friesland.
Fortuna	Bremen	The ship was driven ashore at "Fealtring". She was on a voyage from Porto, Portugal to Bremen.
Frau Antina	Netherlands	The ship was wrecked near Hjørring, Denmark. Her crew were rescued. She was on a voyage from Kronstadt, Russia to Harlingen, Friesland.
Freundschaft	(Denmark) Duchy of Schleswig	The ship was driven ashore and wrecked at Højstrup, Denmark. Her crew were rescued. She was on a voyage from Newcastle upon Tyne, Northumberland, United Kingdom to Varel, Kingdom of Hanover.
Horatio	(United Kingdom of Great Britain and Ireland) Guernsey	The smack was in collision with a Swedish schooner in the English Channel. Her crew were rescued by the schooner, with her passengers remaining aboard. She came ashore at Weymouth, Dorset and her passengers were rescued. Horatio was on a voyage from Guernsey to Plymouth, Devon.
Jenny Lind	United Kingdom	The ship was wrecked near the Wingo Beacon. Her crew were rescued. She was on a voyage from Peterhead, Aberdeenshire to Stettin.
Johanna Elizabeth	Norway	The ship sprang a leak and was beached 7 nautical miles (13 km) west of Helsinki, Grand Duchy of Finland. She was on a voyage from Kronstadt, Russia to Hull, Yorkshire, United Kingdom.
Neptunus	Kingdom of Hanover	The ship was driven ashore on Eierland, North Holland, Netherlands. She was on a voyage from the Elbe to London, United Kingdom.
Peggy	United Kingdom	The smack was driven ashore at Aberdovey, Merionethshire and was abandoned. She was later refloated and taken in to Aberdovey.
Victoria	United Kingdom	The paddle steamer was wrecked near the Wingo Beacon with the loss of eight of the 31 people on board. She was on a voyage from Hull to Saint Petersburg, Russia.

== 10 November ==
List of shipwrecks: 10 November 1852
Ship	State	Description
Æolus	United Kingdom	The full-rigged ship was wrecked at Dar-el-Beida, Morocco with the loss of four of her 23 crew. She was on a voyage from Cardiff, Glamorgan to Valparaíso, Chile.
Agenoria	(United Kingdom of Great Britain and Ireland) Jersey	The ship ran aground on the Longsand, in the North Sea off the coast of Essex. She was refloated but consequently sank. Her crew were rescued by the smack Eagle (United Kingdom). She was on a voyage from Middlesbrough, Yorkshire to Saint-Malo, Ille-et-Vilaine, France.
Agir	Duchy of Holstein	The schooner was discovered derelict at sea and was towed in to the Rogefjord.
Albanian	Flag unknown	The ship departed from Mazagran, Algeria for an American port. No further trace, presumed foundered with the loss of all hands.
Anapolis	United Kingdom	The ship struck a floated wreck and sank in the Baltic Sea 18 nautical miles (33 km) north east of Hoburgen, Sweden. Her crew were rescued. She was on a voyage from Narva, Russia to London.
Ann	United Kingdom	The sloop was driven ashore at Staithes, Yorkshire.
Anna Christina	Flag unknown	The ship was discovered derelict and was towed in to Bridlington, Yorkshire, United Kingdom. She was on a voyage from "Frauborg" to an English port.
Annapolis	United Kingdom	The ship struck a floating wreck and became waterlogged in the North Sea 18 nautical miles (33 km) north east of Aalborg, Denmark. Her crew were rescued. She was on a voyage from Narva, Russia to London. She was taken in to "Wisby" on 9 December in a derelict condition.
Christiania	United Kingdom	The ship was driven ashore near St. Ives, Cornwall.
Emma	United Kingdom	The schooner was driven ashore on Ynys Moelfre, Anglesey and was abandoned. Her crew were rescued by the Moelfre Lifeboat. She was on a voyage from Liverpool, Lancashire to Cardiff, Glamorgan. She subsequently floated off and came ashore in Dulas Bay She was refloated on 14 December and towed in to Amlwch, Anglesey.
Exchange	United Kingdom	The ship was driven ashore Nidden, Prussia. Her crew were rescued. She was consequently condemned.
Gustav	Prussia	The ship was driven ashore and wrecked at "Hansted", Denmark. Her crew were rescued. She was on a voyage from Memel, Prussia to London.
Lucca	United Kingdom	The ship was wrecked at Cape Town, Cape Colony. She was on a voyage from Hartlepool, County Durham to Colombo, Ceylon.
Martha Annette	Bremen	The ship was driven ashore and wrecked at Danzig with the loss of two of her crew. She was on a voyage from Bremen to Danzig.
Mentor	United Kingdom	The ship was wrecked on the Haisborough Sands, in the North Sea off the coast of Norfolk. Her crew were rescued.
Napoleon	Flag unknown	The ship was wrecked at Rostock. Her crew were rescued.
Robert	Russian Empire	The ship was wrecked near Torekov. She was on a voyage from Lisbon, Portugal to Reval.
Royal Oak	United Kingdom	The sloop was in collision with the brig Sydney (United Kingdom) and sank off Lowestoft, Suffolk.
Success	United Kingdom	The ship ran aground and capsized in the Garavogue River. She was on a voyage from Ballysadare, County Sligo to Liverpool She was righted and beached at Ballysadare, County Sligo. She was refloated on 18 November and sailed for Liverpool.
Swea	Sweden	The ship was wrecked at Moulle Point, Cape Colony. She was on a voyage from Hartlepool to Colombo
Thirs Minde	Duchy of Holstein	The ship was driven ashore and wrecked at Klitmøller, Denmark.
Victoria	United Kingdom	The full-rigged ship was wrecked south of "Wingo" with the los of eight lives. She was on a voyage from Hull, Yorkshire to Kronstadt, Russia.
Victoria	Kingdom of Hanover	The ship was driven ashore on Bornholm, Denmark. Her crew were rescued. She was on a voyage from Riga, Russia to Ghent, West Flanders, Belgium.
Wuzeer	United Kingdom	The ship was driven ashore on Ynys Moelfre. She was on a voyage from Liverpool to Bombay, India. She was refloated the next day and resumed her voyage.

== 11 November ==
List of shipwrecks: 11 November 1852
Ship	State	Description
Anna Elise	Kingdom of Hanover	The ship was in collision with a Dutch galiot and sank in the English Channel off Start Point, Devon, United Kingdom. Her crew were rescued. She was on a voyage from Hamburg to Puerto Rico.
Anna Maria	Stettin	The ship was wrecked near "Wangsaa", Denmark. Her crew were rescued. She was on a voyage from Stettin to London, United Kingdom.
Augusta	Prussia	The brig was driven ashore at "Hansted", Denmark. Her crew were rescued. She was on a voyage from Memel to London.
Betsey	United Kingdom	The brig was wrecked at Greystones, County Wicklow. Her crew were rescued.
Bridget	United Kingdom	The ship ran aground in the Irish Sea off the coast of County Wexford and was abandoned. She was on a voyage from Liverpool, Lancashire to Maranhão, Brazil. She floated off and came ashore near Roosland Point, County Wexford.
Courier	United Kingdom	The ship departed from Bristol, Gloucestershire for Lisbon, Portugal. No further trace, presumed foundered with the loss of all hands.
Eliza	(United Kingdom of Great Britain and Ireland) Jersey	The ship was in collision with George Robinson (United Kingdom) and sank in the English Channel off the coast of Devon with the loss of two of her crew. Survivors were rescued by George Robinson.
Grace and Anne	United Kingdom	The smack ran aground on the Plough. She was refloated but was subsequently driven ashore at Skerries, County Dublin.
Hoppet St. Peter's	United Kingdom	The ship was wrecked north of Marstrand, Sweden. Her crew were rescued. She was on a voyage from Hartlepool, County Durham to Gothenburg, Sweden.
Joven Amalia	France	The ship ran aground on the Bachelor Sand, in the North Sea off the coast of Essex, United Kingdom. She was refloated and taken in to Wivenhoe, Essex.
King Olive	United Kingdom	The ship broke free from her moorings and was driven into several vessels at Dublin.
Lady Harriet	United Kingdom	The schooner was wrecked at Greystones with the loss of all but one of her five crew.
Lady Harvey	United Kingdom	The brig ran aground and was wrecked on the Haisborough Sands, in the North Sea off the coast of Norfolk. Her crew survived. She was on a voyage from Newcastle upon Tyne, Northumberland to Cartagena, Spain.
Lita	United Kingdom	The ship was driven ashore and severely damaged at Carlingford, County Louth.
Lord Nelson	United Kingdom	The smack was driven against the quayside and sank at Dublin.
Magneta	United Kingdom	The schooner was driven ashore and wrecked on the coast of County Wexford.
Marin	France	The ship was wrecked on the Goodwin Sands, Kent, United Kingdom. Her crew were rescued. She was on a voyage from Dieppe, Seine-Inférieure to Sunderland, County Durham, United Kingdom.
Meteor	United Kingdom	The brig ran aground on the Haisborough Sands. Her crew were rescued.
New Valiant	United Kingdom	The crewless schooner was driven ashore and wrecked at Greystones.
Paroquet	United Kingdom	The ship departed from Constantinople, Ottoman Empire for Newcastle upon Tyne. No further trace, presumed foundered with the loss of all hands.
Senhouse	United Kingdom	The collier, a brig, was driven ashore and scuttled at Balbriggan railway station, County Dublin. Her crew were rescued with assistance from the crew of the schooner Mountaineer (United Kingdom). Senhouse was on a voyage from Dublin to Whitehaven, Cumberland.
Tynemouth Castle	United Kingdom	The ship was wrecked at Constantinople.
William Pitt	United Kingdom	The collier, a schooner, struck a reef and sank off Clogher Head, County Dublin. Her four crew were rescued by the Coast Guard. She was on a voyage from Whitehaven to Dublin.

== 12 November ==
List of shipwrecks: 12 November 1852
Ship	State	Description
Alexander Mooney	United Kingdom	The ship was driven ashore at Dundalk, County Louth. Her crew were rescued. She was on a voyage from Troon, Ayrshire to Dundalk.
Augustus	United States	The ship was driven ashore and severely damaged at Penarth, Glamorgan, United Kingdom. She was on a voyage from Bristol, Gloucestershire to Cardiff, Glamorgan.
Beverley	United Kingdom	The schooner was driven ashore and wrecked at Tenby, Pembrokeshire. Her crew were rescued. She was on a voyage from Cork to Port Talbot, Glamorgan. Beverley was refloated on 11 December.
Dorothy	United Kingdom	The collier was wrecked on the Herd Sand, in the North Sea off the coast of County Durham. Her crew were rescued by the North Shields Lifeboat. She was on a voyage from South Shields, County Durham to London.
Earl Seaford	United Kingdom	The ship ran aground on the Barber Sand, in the North Sea off the coast of Norfolk. She was refloated and taken in to Great Yarmouth, Norfolk in a leaky condition.
Eliza	(United Kingdom of Great Britain and Ireland) Jersey	The ship was in collision with George Robertson (United Kingdom) and sank in the English Channel with the loss of two of her crew. Survivors were rescued by George Robertson.
Fairfield	United Kingdom	The ship was driven ashore and wrecked east of Point Lynas, Anglesey with the loss of seventeen of her 24 crew. She was on a voyage from Liverpool, Lancashire to Bombay, India.
Harriet, and Mary Ann	United Kingdom	The ships were in collision off the coast of Norfolk. Harriet was driven ashore at Hemsby, Norfolk in a derelict condition. Her crew were rescued. The brig Mary Ann was driven ashore and wrecked at Winterton-on-Sea, Norfolk. Her crew were rescued.
Intrepid	United Kingdom	The schooner sprang a leak and was beached at Cromer, Norfolk. Her crew were rescued. She was on a voyage from Newcastle upon Tyne, Northumberland to London. Intrepid subsequently became a wreck.
Irlam	United Kingdom	The cutter was driven ashore at Sea Stone Point, County Down. Her crew were rescued. She was on a voyage from Liverpool to Dublin.
John	United Kingdom	The brig was wrecked on the Sizewell Bank, in the North Sea off the coast of Suffolk. Her crew were rescued by London Packet (United Kingdom). John was on a voyage from Newcastle upon Tyne to London.
Johns	United Kingdom	The ship was driven ashore at Mappleton, Yorkshire. She was on a voyage from Wisbech, Cambridgeshire to South Shields, County Durham. She was refloated and taken in to Bridlington, Yorkshire, but drove ashore north of the town.
Louisa	United Kingdom	The brig was driven ashore at Caister-on-Sea, Norfolk. Her crew were rescued. She subsequently broke up.
Lyra	United Kingdom	The barque was abandoned off Cape Horn, Chile. All on board were rescued by the brig Josephine (United Kingdom). Lyra was on a voyage from Glasgow, Renfrewshire to San Francisco, California. She sank the next day.
Malvina	Danzig	The ship foundered in the North Sea. Her crew were rescued.
Martha Grace	United Kingdom	The ship was driven ashore at Dundrum, County Down. Her crew were rescued. She was on a voyage from Maryport, Cumberland to Dublin.
Mexico	United Kingdom	The brig was driven ashore and wrecked at Aldeburgh, Suffolk. Her crew were rescued. She was on a voyage from South Shields, County Durham to London.
Minerva	United Kingdom	The barque was wrecked near Drogheda, County Louth with the loss of all but two of her seventeen crew. She was on a voyage from Liverpool to Demerara, British Guiana.
Napoleon	United Kingdom	The schooner was driven ashore at Pwllheli, Caernarfonshire. She was on a voyage from Runcorn, Cheshire to Cork. She was refloated on 26 November and taken in to Abersoch, Caernarfonshire.
Peacock	Norway	The brig was driven ashore at Caister-on-Sea. Her crew were rescued. She was on a voyage from Littlehampton, Sussex to Sunderland, County Durham.
Rebecca	United Kingdom	The ship ran aground on the Barber Sand, in the North Sea off the coast of Norfolk. She was refloated but drove ashore south of Caister-on-Sea and was wrecked.
Seahorse	United Kingdom	The ship was driven ashore and scuttled at Drogheda, County Louth.
Shepherd	United Kingdom	The sloop was driven ashore and wrecked at Hemsby, Norfolk. Her crew were rescued. She was on a voyage from Blyth, Northumberland to Rouen, Seine-Inférieure, France.
Slaney	United Kingdom	The ship was wrecked on the Girdler Sand off the north Kent coast. Her crew were rescued by the lugger Queen and the smacks Ann and Mandamus (all United Kingdom). Slaney was on a voyage from Danzig to London.
Three Brothers	United Kingdom	The ship sank off the Carlingford Lighthouse, County Louth with the loss of all hands.
Wear Packet	United Kingdom	The collier, a brig, sank on the Newcombe Sand, in the North Sea off the coast of Suffolk with the loss of all hands. She was on a voyage from Sunderland, County Durham to London.
Weldaad	Netherlands	The ship was driven ashore and wrecked at Winterton-on-Sea, Norfolk. Her crew were rescued. She was on a voyage from Newcastle upon Tyne to Cartagena, Spain.

== 13 November ==
List of shipwrecks: 13 November 1852
Ship	State	Description
Alley and Betty	United Kingdom	The ship was wrecked at Dundalk, County Louth with the loss of a crew member.
Amelia Elizabeth, or Emelie Elizabeth	Russia	The barque ran aground on the Sunk Sand, in the North Sea off the coast of Essex, United Kingdom. She was on a voyage from Saint Petersburg to Liverpool, Lancashire, United Kingdom. She was refloated but consequently had to be beached on the Gunfleet Sand, where she was wrecked. Her crew were rescued.
Betsey	United Kingdom	The ship was driven ashore and wrecked at Drogheda, County Louth. Her crew were rescued.
Cognac Packet	United Kingdom	The brig was driven ashore at Landguard Fort, Harwich, Essex. She was on a voyage from Shoreham-by-Sea, Sussex to Hartlepool, County Durham. She was refloated and assisted in to Harwich.
Curlyana	United Kingdom	The schooner was driven ashore at Wexford with the loss of three of her four crew. The survivor was rescued by a pilot boat. She was on a voyage from Barrow-in-Furness, Lancashire to Cardiff, Glamorgan.
Eleanore Philippine	(flag) France	The ship was abandoned at Ajaccio, Corsica. She was on a voyage from Sardinia to Marseille, Bouches-du-Rhône.
Elizabeth	United Kingdom	The smack was driven ashore on the coast of Caernarfonshire. She was on a voyage from Liverpool to Barmouth, Merionethshire. She was refloated on 26 November.
Geerdina Beerta	Kingdom of Hanover	The ship ran aground on a reef off "Fredrichson". She was on a voyage from Flensburg to King's Lynn, Norfolk, United Kingdom.
Genius	Kingdom of Hanover	The sloop was discovered derelict in the North Sea. She was towed in to Harwich by the smacks Aurora's Increase and Tryal (both United Kingdom).
George and Mary	United Kingdom	The ship was driven ashore in Barbiere Bay. She was refloated and taken in to Constantinople, Ottoman Empire.
Henry	United Kingdom	The brig was driven ashore at Kastrup, Denmark. She was on a voyage from "Wyburg" to Hull, Yorkshire. She was refloated on 22 November.
Hope	United Kingdom	The smack was driven ashore on the coast of Caernarfonshire. She was on a voyage from Liverpool to Barmouth.
James	United Kingdom	The ship was driven ashore at Barber's Point, in the Dardanelles. She was on a voyage from Liverpool to a Black Sea port.
Johns	United Kingdom	The ship was driven ashore at Bridlington, Yorkshire. She was on a voyage from Wisbech, Cambridgeshire to South Shields, County Durham.
Magnolia	United Kingdom	The crewless schooner was driven ashore at Wexford.
Marie	France	The ship was wrecked near Les Sables-d'Olonne, Vendée. Her crew were rescued. She was on a voyage from an English port to Rochefort, Charente-Maritime.
Mount Carmel	Kingdom of Sardinia	The brig was wrecked at Constantinople, Ottoman Empire with the loss of all but one of her crew.
Pursuit	United Kingdom	The ship sank in the North Sea off Cromer, Norfolk. Her crew were rescued.
Queen Bee	United Kingdom	The ship ran aground off Gallipoli, Ottoman Empire. She was on a voyage from a British port to a Black Sea port. She was refloated and taken in to Constantinople, Ottoman Empire.
Rising Sun	United Kingdom	The ship was driven ashore and wrecked in Studland Bay.
Rose Eugenie	France	The ship was driven against the quayside and sank at Dunkirk, Nord. She was on a voyage from Dieppe, Seine-Inférieure to an English port.
Seaflower	United Kingdom	The ship was driven ashore and wrecked at Arklow, County Wicklow. Her crew were rescued. She was on a voyage from Wexford to Glasgow, Renfrewshire.
Stratten	(United Kingdom of Great Britain and Ireland) Jersey	The ship was driven into by Queen (United Kingdom) and severely damaged at Penarth, Glamorgan. She was on a voyage from Cardiff, Glamorgan to Montevideo, Uruguay.
Superb	United Kingdom	The smack sank off Cardiff.
Venus	United Kingdom	The ship was driven ashore and wrecked at the Mumbles, Glamorgan. Her crew were rescued. She was on a voyage from Aberystwyth, Cardiganshire to Gloucester.
Weldaad	Flag unknown	The ship was driven ashore and wrecked at Winterton-on-Sea, Norfolk, United Kingdom. Her crew were rescued. She was on a voyage from Newcastle upon Tyne, Northumberland, United Kingdom to Cartagena, Spain.

== 14 November ==
List of shipwrecks: 14 November 1852
Ship	State	Description
Agility	United Kingdom	The ship was driven ashore at Clee Ness, Lincolnshire. She was on a voyage from South Shields, County Durham to London. She was refloated and taken in to Grimsby, Lincolnshire.
Ann	United Kingdom	The ship was driven ashore at the Mumbles, Glamorgan. She was later refloated.
Dorothy	United Kingdom	The collier ran aground on the Herd Sand, in the North Sea off the coast of County Durham. Her crew were rescued.
Fly	United Kingdom	The ship was driven ashore and wrecked at the Mumbles.
Funf Gebroeder	Kingdom of Hanover	The galiot was abandoned in the North Sea. Her crew were rescued by Fosnæs (Norway). Funf Gebroeder was subsequently driven ashore at Foulness Island, Essex.
John	United Kingdom	The ship was driven ashore at the Mumbles. She was refloated on 11 December.
Huron	France	The ship was driven ashore and damaged at Abrevach, Finistère. She was on a voyage from Rouen, Seine-Inférieure to Marseille, Bouches-du-Rhone. She was later refloated.
Kitty	United Kingdom	The smack collided with the smack Emma Jane (United Kingdom) and sank in the Atlantic Ocean 16 nautical miles (30 km) north east of Cape Cornwall, Cornwall. Her crew were rescued by Emma Jane. Kitty was on a voyage from Charlestown, Cornwall to Birkenhead, Cheshire.
Maid of Orleans	United Kingdom	The ship was abandoned at sea. Her crew were rescued by Grand Bonny (United Kingdom). Maid of Orleans was on a voyage from Arracan, Burma to Cowes, Isle of Wight.
Marguerite Anais	France	The ship was driven ashore at Saint-Antoine, Gironde. She was on a voyage from Hartlepool, County Durham to Bordeaux, Gironde. She was later refloated.
Marie Laure	France	The ship was driven ashore and wrecked on Pemba Island, Muscat and Oman.
Medea	Stettin	The ship ran aground at Cardigan, United Kingdom. She was on a voyage from Quebec City, Province of Canada, British North America to Cardigan. She was refloated and taken in to Cardigan in a leaky condition.
Oceanus	Stettin	The ship was driven ashore at Cardiff, Glamorgan, United Kingdom. She was on a voyage from Cardiff to Malta.
Sally	United Kingdom	The brigantine collided with Unition ( (United Kingdom of Great Britain and Ireland) Guernsey) off Dungeness, Kent and was abandoned. Her crew were rescued by Unition. Sally was on a voyage from Sunderland, County Durham to Fécamp, Seine-Inférieure, France. She consequently sank in the English Channel 2 nautical miles (3.7 km) south of Hastings, Sussex.
Saville	United Kingdom	The ship was abandoned in the North Sea 25 nautical miles (46 km) off Whitby, Yorkshire. Her crew were rescued by the schooner David (United Kingdom). Saville was on a voyage from South Shields to London.
Shamrock	United Kingdom	The schooner was driven ashore at Dovercourt, Essex. She was on a voyage from Middlesbrough, Yorkshire to Whitstable, Kent. She was refloated and taken in to Harwich, Essed.
Union	United Kingdom	The ship was driven ashore and damaged at the Mumbles. She was refloated on 16 November.
Valiant	United Kingdom	The brig was run into by a steamship and severely damaged in the River Thames at Gravesend, Kent.
William Jane	United Kingdom	The ship was driven ashore and severely damaged at the Mumbles.
Young England	United Kingdom	The ship was driven ashore at Balbriggan, County Dublin. She was on a voyage from Singapore to Liverpool. She floated off but consequently sank with the loss of two of the eighteen people on board. Young England was refloated on 30 January 1853 and beached. She became a wreck on 4 February.

== 15 November ==
List of shipwrecks: 15 November 1852
Ship	State	Description
Britannia	United Kingdom	The brig was wrecked at Skinner's Pond, Prince Edward Island, British North America with the loss of all but one of her crew. She was on a voyage from Miramichi, New Brunswick, British North America to Sunderland, County Durham.
Eliza	United Kingdom	The sloop was driven ashore at Lavernock Point, Glamorgan. She was on a voyage from Newport, Monmouthshire to Liverpool, Lancashire. She was refloated.
Independent	Malta	The ship was driven ashore and severely damaged at Penarth, Glamorgan, United Kingdom. She was on a voyage from Cardiff, Glamorgan to Malta. She was consequently condemned.
Marie et Claire	France	The brig was driven ashore at Gibraltar. She was refloated with assistance of some Royal Navy vessels.
Parana	United States	The brig was driven ashore at Gibraltar. She was refloated with assistance from HMS Antelope (Royal Navy).
Start	United Kingdom	The brig was wrecked at Roberts Cove, County Cork. Her crew were rescued. She was on a voyage from Brăila, Ottoman Empire to Newcastle upon Tyne, Northumberland.

== 16 November ==
List of shipwrecks: 16 November 1852
Ship	State	Description
Amphion	Lübeck	The ship was wrecked near "Furnsund", Sweden. She was on a voyage from Lübeck to Nystadt, Sweden.
Cambridge	United Kingdom	The steamship ran aground on the Mussel Scarp, in the North Sea. She was refloated.
Emma	United Kingdom	The ship ran aground and was damaged at Belfast, County Antrim.
Friendship	United Kingdom	The sloop was wrecked at Killala, County Louth. Her crew were rescued. She was on a voyage from Troon, Ayrshire to Ballina, County Mayo.
Spinning Jenny	United Kingdom	The ship was wrecked on the Royal Charlotte Shoal. Her crew were rescued by Revolucão (Portugal). Spinning Jenny was on a voyage from London to Shanghai, China.
William	United Kingdom	The ship was driven ashore at South Shields, County Durham.

== 17 November ==
List of shipwrecks: 17 November 1852
Ship	State	Description
Beaton	United Kingdom	The ship was driven ashore at Messina, Sicily. She was on a voyage from Galaţi, Ottoman Empire to Queenstown, County Cork. She was refloated on 19 November and resumed her voyage.
Clara	United Kingdom	The ship was wrecked on the Domesnes Reef, in the Baltic Sea. She was on a voyage from Riga, Russia to London.
Mary Ann	United Kingdom	The smack was wrecked at Nash Point, Glamorgan. Her crew were rescued.

== 18 November ==
List of shipwrecks: 18 November 1852
Ship	State	Description
Ann Guthrie	United Kingdom	The schooner was driven ashore near Copenhagen, Denmark. She was on a voyage from Stettin to an English port. She was refloated on 22 November and resumed her voyage.
Martha	(United Kingdom of Great Britain and Ireland) British North America	The ship was struck a rock in Griffin Cove and was beached. She was on a voyage from Richibucto, New Brunswick to Quebec City, Province of Canada.
Rose	United Kingdom	The ship ran aground on the Kentish Knock. She was on a voyage from Hartlepool, County Durham to Dieppe, Seine-Inférieure, France. She was refloated and put in to Lowestoft, Suffolk in a leaky condition.

== 19 November ==
List of shipwrecks: 19 November 1852
Ship	State	Description
Alfred	United Kingdom	The ship was driven ashore in The Swale. She was on a voyage from Milton Regis, Kent to Middlesbrough, Yorkshire.
Blessing	United Kingdom	The sloop was driven ashore at Spurn Point, Yorkshire. Her crew were rescued by the Spurn Lifeboat.
Chance	United Kingdom	The sloop was driven ashore at Spurn Point. Her crew were rescued by the Spurn Lifeboat.
Constantine	United Kingdom	The ship was wrecked near Constantinople, Ottoman Empire. She was on a voyage from Varna, Ottoman Empire to a British port.
Globe	United States	The barque was wrecked in the Gut of Canso. She was on a voyage from Shediac, New Brunswick, British North America to Gloucester, Massachusetts.
Goodman	United Kingdom	The ship was driven ashore in The Swale.
Gustav	Flag unknown	The ship ran aground on the Dramore Bank, in the Irish Sea.
I. Z.	United States	The full-rigged ship ran aground on the Brake Sand, off the north coast of Kent, United Kingdom. She was on a voyage from Antwerp, Belgium to New York. She was refloated with assistance from a lugger.
Kingston	United Kingdom	The ship ran aground on the Corton Sand, in the North Sea off the coast of Suffolk. She was on a voyage from Memel, Prussia to London.
Stanton	United Kingdom	The ship was driven ashore at Boulogne-sur-Mer, Pas-de-Calais, France. She was repaired in situ and was refloated on 17 February 1853.

== 20 November ==
List of shipwrecks: 20 November 1852
Ship	State	Description
Chester	United Kingdom	The smack was abandoned in the Irish Sea. Her crew were rescued by Rover (United Kingdom). Chester was subsequently driven ashore at Wexford. She was on a voyage from Ayr to Neath, Glamorgan.
Cyrus	United Kingdom	The ship sank in the lock at the entrance to the Thames and Medway Canal at Gravesend, Kent. Her crew were rescued.
Earl of Ripon	United Kingdom	The ship departed from Matanzas, Cuba for Falmouth, Cornwall. No further trace, presumed foundered with the loss of all hands.
Nightingale	United Kingdom	The ship was driven ashore and severely damaged at Appledore, Devon. She was on a voyage from Newport, Monmouthshire to Boston, Massachusetts, United States. She was refloated on 23 November and taken in to Appledore.
Rollon	France	The ship ran aground in the Seine. She was on a voyage from Rouen, Seine-Inférieure to Goeree, Zeeland, Netherlands.
Sir Charles Fitzroy	United Kingdom	The brig foundered in the North Sea off Filey, Yorkshire. Her crew were rescued. She was on a voyage from South Shields, County Durham to London.
Twe Brodre	Denmark	The ship was wrecked on a reef off "Botsaxer". She was on a voyage from Odense to Portsmouth, Hampshire, United Kingdom.
Tweed	United Kingdom	The ship struck a rock and was damaged at Portland, Maine, United States.

== 21 November ==
List of shipwrecks: 21 November 1852
Ship	State	Description
Cuba	United Kingdom	The ship was driven ashore in Algoa Bay.
Ottoman	United Kingdom	The ship was wrecked on Cape Sable Island, Nova Scotia, British North America. She was on a voyage from Newfoundland, British North America to Boston, Massachusetts, United States.

== 22 November ==
List of shipwrecks: 22 November 1852
Ship	State	Description
Caractacus	United Kingdom	The schooner departed from Llanelly, Glamorgan for Plymouth, Devon. Subsequently foundered with the loss of all hands. Wreckage washed up a Stratton, Cornwall on 2 December.
Charles Saunders	United Kingdom	The ship was abandoned in the Atlantic Ocean. Her crew were rescued by Frithiof (Flag unknown). Charles Saunders was on a voyage from Liverpool, Lancashire to New Orleans, Louisiana, United States.
Eliza	United Kingdom	The ship was wrecked on a reef in the Baltic Sea.
Isabella	United Kingdom	The ship was driven ashore at Ardrossan, Ayrshire.
Jubilee	United Kingdom	The ship was abandoned in the Atlantic Ocean with the loss of two of her crew. She was on a voyage from Troon, Ayrshire to Cuba.
Margaret and Jane	United Kingdom	The ship was abandoned off Milford Haven, Pembrokeshire with the loss of all but two of her crew. She was on a voyage from Barmouth, Merionethshire to Milford Haven. Margaret and Jane was towed in to Milford Haven on 24 November.
Sir William Wallace	United Kingdom	The paddle tug ran aground in the Clyde at Bowling, Dunbartonshire.

== 23 November ==
List of shipwrecks: 23 November 1852
Ship	State	Description
Dryad	United Kingdom	The ship was driven ashore and severely damaged at Laxey, Isle of Man.
Eliza	United Kingdom	The ship was driven ashore and wrecked on Gotland, Sweden. Her crew were rescued. She was on a voyage from Riga, Russia to Belfast, County Antrim.
Elizabeth	United Kingdom	The Yorkshire Billyboy ran aground on the Nore, floated off, struck the wreck of the sloop Apollo (United Kingdom) and sank. Her crew were rescued by the yawl Jane and Mary (United Kingdom). She was on a voyage from Wisbech, Cambridgeshire to London. Elizabeth was refloated on 2 December and beached on the Isle of Grain, Kent.
Margaret Brock	United Kingdom	The barque was wrecked on a reef about 3.0 nautical miles (5.5 km) west of Cape Jaffa in South Australia without the loss of life. She was on a voyage from Port Adelaide to Melbourne.
Mary	United Kingdom	The ship was driven ashore and severely damaged at Laxey.
Mary	United Kingdom	The sloop was driven ashore and sank at Winterton-on-Sea, Norfolk. Her crew were rescued. She was on a voyage from Sunderland, County Durham to Woodbridge, Suffolk.
Orion	(United Kingdom of Great Britain and Ireland) British North America	The ship was wrecked on Salt Key. She was on a voyage from the Turks Islands to Boston, Massachusetts, United States.
Patience	United Kingdom	The schooner foundered off Land's End, Cornwall with the loss of all hands. She was on a voyage from Port Talbot, Glamorgan to Plymouth, Devon.
Robert Bruce	United Kingdom	The ship was sighted off Portland, Dorset whilst on a voyage from Leith, Lothian to Cádiz, Spain. No further trace, presumed foundered with the loss of all hands.
Sarah Scott	United Kingdom	The ship departed from Sunderland, County Durham for Constantinople, Ottoman Empire. No further trace, presumed foundered with the loss of all ten crew.
Victorine	France	The ship was wrecked at Guernsey, Channel Islands. Her crew were either rescued, or drowned.
William Watson	United Kingdom	The tug ran aground in the Clyde and sank.
Zealous	United Kingdom	The ship was driven ashore at Figueira da Foz, Portugal. She was on a voyage from Newfoundland, British North America to Figueira da Foz. She was later refloated and taken in to Figueira da Foz.

== 24 November ==
List of shipwrecks: 24 November 1852
Ship	State	Description
Admiral	United Kingdom	The ship ran aground at Waterford. She was on a voyage from Liverpool, Lancashire to Waterford.
Admiral Drake	United Kingdom	The schooner collided with Nautilus (United Kingdom) and sank in the River Thames at Lower Hope, Kent.
Atlas	United Kingdom	The flat foundered in the Irish Sea with the loss of two of her crew.
Carl	Flag unknown	The schooner was wrecked near Plougarneau, Finistère, France with the loss of all hands.
Ceres	Belgium	The ship was abandoned in the Atlantic Ocean. Her crew were rescued. She was on a voyage from Cardiff, Glamorgan, United Kingdom to Porto, Portugal.
Chase	United Kingdom	The brig ran aground on the Longsand, in the North Sea off the coast of Essex. Her crew were rescued by the smack Benevolence (United Kingdom). Chase was on a voyage from South Shields, County Durham to Boulogne, Pas-de-Calais, France.
Chase	United Kingdom	The brig was wrecked on the Fouillets, in the Bay of Saint Anne. She was on a voyage from Newcastle upon Tyne, Northumberland to Bordeaux, Gironde, France.
Cygne	France	The ship was driven ashore at Camaret-sur-Mer, Finistère. Her crew were rescued. She was on a voyage from Newcastle upon Tyne to Bayonne, Basses-Pyrénées.
Echo	Netherlands	The galiot was wrecked on Belle Île, Morbihan, France. Her crew were rescued. She was on a voyage from Bordeaux, Gironde, France to Amsterdam, North Holland.
Eliza	United Kingdom	The ship ran aground on the Maplin Sand or the Shoebury Knock Sand, in the North Sea off the coast of Essex. She was on a voyage from Limerick to London. She was refloated on 27 November and resumed her voyage.
Ferdinand	France	The ship was driven ashore at Paimbœuf, Loire-Inférieure.
Gaspar Monge	France	The barque foundered in the Atlantic Ocean (48°38′N 9°15′W). Her crew were rescued by the barque Ægir (Russia).
Glenelg	United Kingdom	The East Indiaman was abandoned in the Atlantic Ocean (45°20′N 14°11′W). Her crew were rescued by Nestor (United Kingdom). Glenelg was on a voyage from Bombay, India to London.
Good Intent	United Kingdom	The sailing barge sprang a leak and was beached at Rye, Sussex, where she was wrecked with the loss of one life. She was on a voyage from Shoreham-by-Sea to Hastings.
Iris	United Kingdom	The ship was abandoned off Trevose Head, Cornwall. Her crew were rescued.
John Robertson	United Kingdom	The brig was abandoned in the Atlantic Ocean. Her crew were rescued. She was on a voyage from Ramsgate, Kent to Sitges, Spain.
Lion	United Kingdom	The schooner was driven ashore at Beaumaris, Anglesey.
Lively Sea	United Kingdom	The flat was driven ashore at Beaumaris with the loss of her captain. She subsequently became a wreck.
Louise Amelie	France	The schooner was driven ashore near Camaret-sur-Mer. Her crew were rescued. She was on a voyage from Sunderland, County Durham, to Bordeaux, Gironde.
Marie	France	The schooner was abandoned at sea. Her crew were rescued by HMS Sans Pareil (Royal Navy). Marie was on a voyage from Fécamp, Seine-Inférieure to Cette, Hérault.
Mary	United Kingdom	The ship was driven ashore at Hemsby, Norfolk.
Owl	United Kingdom	The flat was driven ashore at Beaumaris.
Paul Ernst	Flag unknown	The ship was driven ashore at Paimbœuf.
Pauline	France	The ship was driven ashore at Paimbœuf.
Platina	United Kingdom	The barque was abandoned in the Atlantic Ocean. Her crew were rescued by the full-rigged ship Gondar (United States). Platina was on a voyage from Cardiff, Glamorgan to Portsmouth, New Hampshire, United States. She was discovered the next day 60 nautical miles (110 km) south west of The Lizard, Cornwall by Happy Return (United Kingdom). She was towed in to Fowey, Cornwall, where she arrived on 26 November.
Polly	United Kingdom	The schooner was driven ashore and wrecked east of Hayle, Cornwall with the loss of all but one of her six crew. She was on a voyage from Liverpool to Harlingen, Friesland, Netherlands.
Prosper	United Kingdom	The ship was driven ashore at Paimbœuf.
Sisters	United Kingdom	The brig was abandoned in the Atlantic Ocean. Her crew were rescued by Standard (United Kingdom). Sisters was on a voyage from Buctouche, New Brunswick, British North America to Belfast, County Antrim. Sisters was towed in to Tory Island, County Donegal in a derelict condition on 23 January 1853.
Thomas	United Kingdom	The sailing barge foundered in the Thames Estuary with the loss of three of the four people on board. The survivor was rescued by a Jersey smack. She was on a voyage from Sheerness, Kent to London.
William and Thomas	United Kingdom	The ship was driven ashore and wrecked at St. Agnes, Cornwall. Her crew were rescued. She was on a voyage from Hayle to Llanelly, Glamorgan.

== 25 November ==
List of shipwrecks: 25 November 1852
Ship	State	Description
Asia	United Kingdom	The ship was beached at the Mumbles, Glamorgan. She was on a voyage from Adelaide, South Australia to Swansea, Glamorgan. She was refloated on 28 November and towed in to Swansea.
Atalanta	United Kingdom	The smack was driven ashore near Drogheda, County Louth. She was on a voyage from Belfast, County Antrim to Skerries, County Dublin. She was refloated on 8 December and taken in to Drogheda for repairs.
Bee	United Kingdom	The brig was driven ashore at Worthing, Sussex. She was on a voyage from Sunderland, County Durham to Shoreham-by-Sea, Sussex. She was refloated on 27 November with assistance from the steamship Alice (United Kingdom) and towed in to Shoreham-by-Sea.
Candace	United Kingdom	The ship was abandoned with the loss of a crew member. Survivors were rescued by the schooner Betsey (United Kingdom). Candace was on a voyage from Kertch, Russia to a British port.
Christina	United Kingdom	The ship was wrecked on the Caterline Rocks, near Stonehaven, Aberdeenshire. Her six crew were rescued. She was on a voyage from Montrose, Forfarshire to London.
Citizen	United Kingdom	The ship struck a sunken rock in Loch Eynort and was beached on South Uist, Outer Hebrides. She was on a voyage from Riga, Russia to Newry, County Antrim. She was repaired and resumed her voyage, arriving at Warrenpoint, County Down on 4 December.
Cygnet	(United Kingdom of Great Britain and Ireland) British North America	The schooner was driven ashore at Yarmouth, Nova Scotia.
Edward	United Kingdom	The brig foundered in the North Sea off the coast of Aberdeenshire with the loss of all hands.
Emma	United Kingdom	The ship was driven ashore and wrecked near Kilmichael, County Cork. She was on a voyage from Glasgow, Renfrewshire to Swansea, Glamorgan.
Fox	United Kingdom	The ship was driven ashore on Île Ronde, Brest, Finistère, France. She was on a voyage from Newport, Monmouthshire to Brest.
Frederick	United Kingdom	The barque was abandoned in the Atlantic Ocean. Her crew were rescued. She was on a voyage from Liverpool, Lancashire to Apalachicola, Florida, United States.
Harleys	United Kingdom	The ship ran aground in the River Boyne. She was on a voyage from Drogheda, County Louth to Newcastle upon Tyne, Northumberland.
Helen and Jean	United Kingdom	The schooner foundered in the North Sea with the loss of all seven crew. Her stern came ashore at Montrose on 30 November.
Henwick	United Kingdom	The steamship was driven ashore at Havre de Grâce, Seine-Inférieure, France. She was on a voyage from Liverpool, Lancashire to Rouen, Seine-Inférieure. She was refloated and resumed her voyage.
Honour	United Kingdom	The ship was driven ashore and wrecked at Blyth, Northumberland.
Locket	United Kingdom	The ship ran aground in the Yangtze. She was on a voyage from Shanghai, China to London.
Mary Henzell	United Kingdom	The ship ran aground at Barber's Point, in the Dardanelles. She was on a voyage from Venice, Kingdom of Lombardy–Venetia to Constantinople, Ottoman Empire. She was refloated on 3 December and sailed for Constantinople, Ottoman Empire.
Ranha	Russia	The barque was driven ashore at "Laperle".
Minnie	United Kingdom	The ship was driven ashore at Pictou, Nova Scotia. She was on a voyage from New York to Charlottetown, Prince Edward Island, British North America. She was refloated and taken in to Charlottetown.
San Dionisio	Greece	The brig was driven ashore at Galway, United Kingdom. She was on a voyage from Galaţi, Ottoman Empire to Galway.

== 26 November ==
List of shipwrecks: 26 November 1852
Ship	State	Description
Amity	United Kingdom	The ship was driven ashore and wrecked near Fort Cumberland, Hampshire. Her crew were rescued. She was on a voyage from Hartlepool, County Durham to Bridport, Dorset.
Annie	United Kingdom	The flat was in collision with another vessel and sank in the River Mersey. All three people on board were rescued by the Mersey Ferry Vernon (United Kingdom).
Armistead	United Kingdom	The brig was driven ashore and wrecked north of Aberdeen. with the loss of six of her seven crew. Her captain survived.
Charlotte	United Kingdom	The brig was abandoned in the Bristol Channel 25 nautical miles (46 km) west of Lundy Island, Devon. Her crew were rescued by Robert Watson (United Kingdom).
Daisy	Denmark	The ship was driven ashore and wrecked at Aarhus.
Daphne	United Kingdom	The schooner was driven ashore and wrecked at Lyme Regis, Dorset. Her crew were rescued. She was on a voyage from Middlesbrough, Yorkshire to Torquay, Devon.
Earl of Mar	United Kingdom	The brig ran aground and sank at Sunderland, County Durham.
Edward	United Kingdom	The brig foundered off the coast of Aberdeenshire with the loss of all hands. The wreck camed ashore near Montrose.
Forrester	United Kingdom	The schooner ran aground on the Amcot Sand off Montrose, Forfarshire and was wrecked with the loss of all but one of her crew. The survivor was rescued by the Montrose Lifeboat. She was on a voyage from Newcastle upon Tyne to Montrose. She was refloated on 30 November and taken in to Montrose.
Frederick	Russian Empire	The ship ran aground on the Galloper Sand, in the North Sea off the coast of Suffolk, United Kingdom and sank. Her crew were rescued. She was on a voyage from Liverpool, Lancashire to Liepāja. She floated off but consequently sank. Her crew were rescued by the lugger Gratitude (United Kingdom).
Integrity	United Kingdom	The ship was wrecked at Main-à-Dieu, Nova Scotia, British North America.
Janet and Isabel	United Kingdom	The schooner was driven ashore between Johnshaven and Gourdon, Aberdeenshire with the loss of all hands. She was on a voyage from Montrose to Burghead, Moray.
Jeanie	United Kingdom	The ship was driven ashore and wrecked near Peterhead, Aberdeenshire.
John Pedder	United Kingdom	The ship was driven ashore at Blyth, Northumberland.
La Force	France	The ship was driven ashore at Sutton-on-Sea, Lincolnshire, United Kingdom. She was refloated on 29 November and towed in to Grimsby, Lincolnshire.
Lemuel	United Kingdom	The brig was driven ashore in Studland Bay.
Lerwegian	United Kingdom	The sloop was driven ashore and wrecked at Buna Voe, Shetland Islands.
Margaret	United Kingdom	The ship was driven ashore at Scarborough, Yorkshire. She was refloated the next day and taken in to Scarborough.
Osbourne	United Kingdom	The ship was driven ashore 2 nautical miles (3.7 km) south of Bridlington, Yorkshire. She was on a voyage from Seaham, County Durham to Colchester, Essex. She was refloated the next day and taken in to Bridlington.
Rebecca	United Kingdom	The ship was driven ashore near Arendal, Norway. She was on a voyage from Newcastle upon Tyne to Skien, Norway. She floated off but consequently sank. Her crew were rescued.
Venus	United Kingdom	The brig was driven ashore and wrecked north of Aberdeen with the loss of six of her seven crew. The survivor was rescued by the Aberdeen Lifeboat. She was on a voyage from Newcastle upon Tyne to Aberdeen.
Vivid	United Kingdom	The ship was driven ashore and severely damaged at Peterhead. Her crew were rescued. She was on a voyage from London to Peterhead. She was refloated and taken in to Peterhead.

== 27 November ==
List of shipwrecks: 27 November 1852
Ship	State	Description
Charlotte	United Kingdom	The barque was wrecked on the Salthouse Bank, in the Irish Sea off the coast of Lancashire. Her crew were rescued. She was on a voyage from Quebec City, Province of Canada, British North America to Glasson Dock, Lancashire.
Competitor	United Kingdom	The ship was abandoned in the North Sea 70 nautical miles (130 km) east of Montrose, Forfarshire. Her crew survived. She was on a voyage from Hamburg to Leith, Lothian.
Cressinus	United Kingdom	The brig ran aground and was damaged at Hartlepool, County Durham.
Cuba	United Kingdom	The brig ran aground at Hartlepool. She was on a voyage from London to Hartlepool. She was refloated and taken in to Hartlepool.
Daphne	United Kingdom	The ship was wrecked on the Île de Ré, Finistère, France with the loss of all hands. She was on a voyage from Torbay to Bordeaux, Gironde, France.
Ernest	France	The ship struck a rock and capsized at "Pleubihan". Her crew were rescued.
Iceni	United Kingdom	The ship was abandoned in the English Channel. Her crew were rescued by Magdelina (Netherlands). Iceni was on a voyage from Newcastle upon Tyne, Northumberland to Valencia, Spain.
John and Lucy	United Kingdom	The ship foundered in the Atlantic Ocean. Her crew were rescued by the full-rigged ship Gondar (United States). John and Lucy was on a voyage from London to New Orleans, Louisiana, United States.
Jonge Catharina	Netherlands	The ship was abandoned in the English Channel 7 nautical miles (13 km) south west of Penzance, Cornwall, United Kingdom. Her crew were rescued by Standard (United Kingdom). Jonge Catharina was on a voyage from Cardiff, Glamorgan, United Kingdom to Malta.
Pioneer	(United Kingdom of Great Britain and Ireland) British North America	The schooner was driven ashore in Seven Mile Bay. She was on a voyage from Charlottetown, Prince Edward Island to "Tegnish".
Supply	United Kingdom	The brig ran aground on the Corton Sand, in the North Sea off the coast of Suffolk. She was on a voyage from Sunderland to Newhaven, Sussex. She was refloated and towed in to Lowestoft, Suffolk by a tug.

== 28 November ==
List of shipwrecks: 28 November 1852
Ship	State	Description
British Oak	United Kingdom	The schooner was driven ashore near Newcastle, County Down.
Chieftain	United Kingdom	The ship was driven ashore near Newcastle, County Down. Her crew were rescued. She was on a voyage from Belfast, County Antrim to Savannah, Georgia, United States.
Ernest	France	The ship struck a sunken rock and capsized at Kerbors, Côtes-du-Nord. Her crew were rescued.
Oswy	United Kingdom	The brig was driven ashore and severely damaged at Shoreham-by-Sea, Sussex.
Resolution	United Kingdom	The ship ran aground on the Horse Bank, in the Solent. She was on a voyage from Sunderland, County Durham to Southampton, Hampshire. She was refloated and put in to Portsmouth, Hampshire in a leaky condition.
Udonia	Danzig	The ship was sighted in the Øresund whilst on a voyage from Danzig to Rochefort, Charente-Maritime, France. No further trace, presumed foundered with the loss of all hands.
Wilhelmina	Netherlands	The ship departed from Kronstadt, Russia for the Meuse (Dutch: Maas). No further trace, presumed foundered with the loss of all hands.
Wolfe	United Kingdom	The ship was wrecked near St. Peter's, Nova Scotia, British North America. She was on a voyage from Quebec City, Province of Canada, British North America to Liverpool, Lancashire. She was refloated in late June 1853 and taken in to Pictou, Nova Scotia.

== 29 November ==
List of shipwrecks: 29 November 1852
Ship	State	Description
Dundalk	United Kingdom	The schooner was driven ashore at Ballaghan Point, County Down. She was on a voyage from Liverpool, Lancashire to Dundalk, County Louth.
James Dunlop	United Kingdom	The brig sprang a leak and foundered in the Irish Sea off the North West Lightship ( Trinity House). Her seven crew were rescued by the lightship. She was on a voyage from Liverpool, Lancashire to Limerick.
Louis and Celine	France	The ship was driven ashore west of Calais. She was on a voyage from Rouen, Seine-Inférieure to Seaham, County Durham, United Kingdom. She was refloated and taken in to Calais.
Wanderer	Kingdom of Hanover	The ewer was abandoned in the North Sea. Her crew were rescued. She was on a voyage from the Clyde to Altona, Hamburg.
Wonder	United Kingdom	The ship capsized at South Shields, County Durham.

== 30 November ==
List of shipwrecks: 30 November 1852
Ship	State	Description
Apollo	(United Kingdom of Great Britain and Ireland) Guernsey	The schooner was wrecked on the Follet Rocks, off Alderney, Channel Islands. Her crew were rescued. She was on a voyage from Newcastle upon Tyne, Northumberland to Alderney.
Bouwina	Denmark	The ship was driven ashore on Öland, Sweden. She was on a voyage from Saint Petersburg, Russia to Copenhagen.
Catharina	Netherlands	The ship was wrecked on Saaremaa, Russia. She was on a voyage from Riga, Russia to Amsterdam, North Holland.
Erline Catharine	Norway	The ship was abandoned 18 nautical miles (33 km) off "Sudenes". Her crew were rescued by James (United Kingdom). Erline Catharine was on a voyage from Charlestown, Cornwall, United Kingdom to Dram.
Francis	(United Kingdom of Great Britain and Ireland) British North America	The schooner was lost in the Gut of Canso. She was on a voyage from Charlottetown, Prince Edward Island to Souris, Prince Edward Island.
Graciosa	Belgium	The schooner was wrecked on "Crable Island". All on board were rescued. She was on a voyage from La Guaira, Venezuela to Saint Thomas, Virgin Islands.
Queen	United Kingdom	The derelict ship was taken in to Alderney.
Regard	United Kingdom	The brig, master Luke C. Taylor, was last sighted in the Baltic Sea off Öland, Sweden, on 30 October. She foundered with the loss of all hands at Föglö, Åland. Jerry Wilhelmsson found the wreck at 2016.
Richard and Ann	United Kingdom	The ship was abandoned in the Atlantic Ocean. Her crew were rescued by Josephine (France). Richard Ann was on a voyage from Newcastle upon Tyne to Lisbon, Portugal. She was towed in to La Rochelle, Charente-Maritime, France on 10 December.

== Unknown date ==
List of shipwrecks: Unknown date in November 1852
Ship	State	Description
Acastus	United Kingdom	The ship was driven ashore at Graham's Point, Prince Edward Island, British North America. She was on a voyage from Liverpool, Lancashire to Charlottetown, Prince Edward Island. She had been refloated and towed in to Charlottetown by 15 November.
Achilles	Danzig	The ship ran aground on the Middle Ground, between Copenhagen and Helsingør, Denmark.
Alcyon	France	The schooner was discovered abandoned in the English Channel off Dungeness, Kent, United Kingdom. She was on a voyage from Rotterdam, South Holland, Netherlands to Pontrieux, Côtes-du-Nord. Alcyon was towed in to Harwich, Essex by the smack Lallah Rookh (United Kingdom).
Alfred	United Kingdom	The ship ran aground 8.11.1852 off Vänö, Grand Duchy of Finland. She floated off and sank. Her crew were rescued. She was on a voyage from Newcastle upon Tyne, Northumberland to Kronstadt, Russia.
Anna and Mary	United Kingdom	The brig was abandoned in the Atlantic Ocean. Her crew were rescued by Derwent (United Kingdom).
Bernadotte	Sweden	The ship was driven ashore on Sælør, Norway. She was on a voyage from Porto, Portugal to Gothenburg. She was refloated and put in to Farsund, Norway for repairs.
Bilton	United Kingdom	The barque foundered in the Pacific Ocean 60 nautical miles (110 km) west of "Realito", Chile. Her crew were rescued.
Buckeye Belle	United States	The steamboat suffered a boiler explosion and sank in the Ohio River near Mariette, Ohio, with the loss of fifteen lives.
Caroline and Mary	France	The ship was driven ashore near New Orleans, Louisiana, United States. She was on a voyage from Havre de Grâce, Seine-Inférieure to New Orleans. She was refloated and taken in to New Orleans, where she arrived on 12 November.
Cinderella	United Kingdom	The ship sank off the Runnel Stone. Her crew were rescued by Emma (United Kingdom). Cinderella was on a voyage from Bristol, Gloucestershire to Ryde, Isle of Wight.
Civility	United Kingdom	The ship was driven ashore. She was on a voyage from Onega, Russia to Bristol, Gloucestershire. She was refloated and put in to Lerwick, Shetland Islands in a leaky condition.
Conservative	United States	The ship sank at Sydney, Nova Scotia, British North America between 21 and 27 November.
Defiance	United States	The ship was lost before 10 November. She was on a voyage from Portland, Maine to Nova Scotia, British North America.
Effort	United Kingdom	The ship was driven ashore east of Baltic Port, Russia. She was on a voyage from Liverpool, Lancashire to Narva, Russia. She was severely damaged by fire on 16 November. Effort was refloated on 19 November and taken in to "Baltic Port".
Eline Catherine	Norway	The ship was abandoned at sea. She was on a voyage from Charleston, South Carolina, United States to Dram.
Elise and Anna	France	The brig struck a wreck in the North Sea 150 nautical miles (280 km) east by north of Flamborough Head, Yorkshire, United Kingdom and was abandoned before 8 November.
Eliza Anne	Prussia	The ship was abandoned in the North Sea before 19 November.
Feliz Deltino	Portugal	The ship was abandoned in the Atlantic Ocean before 20 November. Her crew were rescued by Vivid (United Kingdom). Feliz Deltino was on a voyage from Lisbon to New York, United States.
Flora	United Kingdom	The ship capsized in the Irish Sea off the coast of Pembrokeshire between 17 and 26 November.
Garonne	Norway	The brig was abandoned in the Atlantic Ocean. She was on a voyage from the Charente to Philadelphia, Pennsylvania, United States.
Globe	United States	The steamship was wrecked in Lake Erie.
Grimsby Hall	United Kingdom	The ship ran aground on the Herd Sand, in the North Sea off the coast of County Durham. She was refloated on 24 November.
Haabets Anker	(Russian Empire) Grand Duchy of Finland	The ship was abandoned in the North Sea before 7 November. She was on a voyage from a Finnish port to an English port. She was taken in to Copenhagen, Denmark in a derelict condition.
Harmonie	Netherlands	The galiot was abandoned in the Atlantic Ocean before 4 November.
Heno	Denmark	The ship was driven ashore and wrecked on Hogland, Russia before 16 November.
Henriette	Denmark	The ship was abandoned in the North Sea before 12 November. Her crew were rescued. She was on a voyage from Randers to Leith, Lothian, United Kingdom.
Henry A. Holbrook	United States	The fishing schooner sank in a gale on the Georges Bank (one source says November 1853). Lost with all 8 crew.
Hiram	(Russian Empire) Grand Duchy of Finland	The ship ran aground off "Hammo" and was abandoned. She broke up on 4 November.
Hirundo	United Kingdom	The ship sprang a leak and sank 60 nautical miles (110 km) east of Tobago. Her crew were rescued. She was on a voyage from Demerara, British Guiana to London.
Johns	United Kingdom	The ship sank off Østerisør, Norway. She was on a voyage from Riga, Russia to London.
John S. de Wolfe	United Kingdom	The ship was wrecked on Blackbeard Island, Georgia, United States before 21 November. All on board were rescued. She was on a voyage from Liverpool, Lancashire to Savannah, Georgia.
Leontine Mary	(United Kingdom of Great Britain and Ireland) Colony of Natal	The schooner was driven ashore and severely damaged at the mouth of the Natal River before 6 November. She was refloated.
Linnea	Sweden	The ship was abandoned in the North Sea. Her crew were rescued. She was on a voyage from Gothenburg to St. Ubes, Portugal.
Lyra	United Kingdom	The ship was abandoned off Cape Horn, Chile. Her crew were rescued by Josephine (United Kingdom) and she sank the next day. She was on a voyage from Glasgow, Renfrewshire to San Francisco, California, United States.
Maria	United Kingdom	The ship was driven ashore at Helsingør, Denmark. She was refloated on 4 November and resumed her voyage.
Maria	Belgium	The galiot was abandoned in the North Sea before 11 November. Her crew were rescued. She was on a voyage from Saint Petersburg, Russia to Harlingen, Friesland, Netherlands.
Mary	Norway	The derelict barque was taken in to Komlesund.
Methusa	Stettin	The ship was driven ashore and wrecked on Saaremaa, Russia. She was on a voyage from Stettin to "Wyborg".
Ole Bull	Norway	The ship was wrecked before 20 November.
Peggy	United Kingdom	The ship was wrecked in the Sea of Marmora before 18 November. She was on a voyage from South Shields, County Durham to Odesa.
Perseverance	United Kingdom	The ship was driven ashore. She was on a voyage from Kronstadt, Russia to London. She was refloated and put in to Christiansand, Norway on 17 November.
Perseverancia	Spain	The ship was in collision with another vessel and foundered off Cape Horn. All on board were rescued by Zenobia (United States). Perseverance was on a voyage from Cádiz, Spain to Guayaquil, Ecuador.
Polixene	France	The ship ran aground in the Gironde before 24 November. She was on a voyage from Bordeaux, Gironde to Havre de Grâce.
Powhattan	United States	The steamship foundered in Lake Erie with the loss of all hands.
Preciosa	Prussia	The ship was wrecked on the Nidingen Reef, in the Baltic Sea before 6 November. She was on a voyage from Memel to London.
Princeton	United States	The steamship foundered in Lake Erie with the loss of all on board.
Rebecca	United Kingdom	The brig ran aground on the Holm Sand, in the North Sea off the coast of Suffolk. She was on a voyage from Sunderland, County Durham to London. She was refloated and resumed her voyage.
Rosalie	France	The ship was wrecked. Her crew were rescued. She was on a voyage from Havre de Grâce to Bordeaux.
Rosebud	United Kingdom	The ship ran aground on the Middle Ground. She was on a voyage from Memel, Prussia to London.
Samson	United States	The steamship was wrecked in Lake Erie.
Soligny	France	The ship was lost before 24 November.
Soverain	Norway	The ship departed from South Shields for Hong Kong. No further trace, presumed foundered with the loss of all hands.
The Jenny	Flag unknown	The schooner sank in the River Trent upstream of Althorpe, Lincolnshire, United Kingdom.
Tjapka Scherinka	Lübeck	The ship sank off Bornholm, Denmark before 22 November. Her crew were rescued. She was on a voyage from Stockholm, Sweden to a Dutch port.
Triton	United States	The brig was abandoned in the Atlantic Ocean before 20 November. She was on a voyage from Málaga, Spain to Boston, Massachusetts.
Viatic	United Kingdom	The ship was driven ashore at Emmaste, Russia before 5 November. She was on a voyage from Newcastle upon Tyne to Turku, Grand Duchy of Finland. She had become a wreck by 19 November.
Wilhelm	Denmark	The ship was driven ashore. She was on a voyage from Cádiz, Spain to Helsingør. She was refloated and put in to Farsund on 13 November in a leaky condition.
Yorkshire	United Kingdom	The ship was wrecked at Matane, Province of Canada, British North America in mid-November. Her crew were rescued. She was on a voyage from Quebec City, Province of Canasa to Bristol, Gloucestershire.
