= Coutts Inlet =

Body of water in Nunavut, Canada

Bylot Island at the top, separated from Baffin Island by the Eclipse Sound

Coutts Inlet (72°04′N 075°10′W) is a body of water in Nunavut's Qikiqtaaluk Region. It is an arm of Baffin Bay in northeastern Baffin Island. The inlet flows in a southwestern direction and includes a northern arm that juts off the main inlet close to the mouth. Nova Zembla Island and Round Island are located near the mouth of Coutts Inlet.

The inlet is frequented by narwhals.
