= Langor Island =

Island in the Arno Atoll, Marshall Islands

Coordinates: 7.124°N 171.93°E

Langor (Marshallese: Ļōn̄ar, [lˠʌŋɑrˠ]) is one of the most populous islands in the Arno Atoll. It is part of the Marshall Islands in the Pacific Ocean.
