= Nova Zembla Island =

Uninhabited island in Nunavut, Canada

- Location within Nunavut Location within Canada

Geography
- Location: Northern Canada
- Coordinates: 72.18°N 74.83°W
- Archipelago: Arctic Archipelago

Administration
- Canada
- Nunavut: Nunavut
- Region: Qikiqtaaluk

Demographics
- Population: Uninhabited

Nova Zembla Island ("New Land") is an uninhabited island in the Qikiqtaaluk Region of Nunavut, Canada. It is located across the mouth of Coutts Inlet in Baffin Bay off the northeastern coast of Baffin Island. Round Island is 7.4 km (4.6 mi) to the southeast.

The island was visited in 1875 by a Swedish expedition led by Adolf Erik Nordenskiöld and sponsored by the businessman Oscar Dickson.
