= Thornport, Ohio =

Thornport
- Census-designated place
- Interactive map of Thornport
- Coordinates: 39°55′15″N 82°25′37″W
- Country: United States
- State: Ohio
- County: Perry
- Elevation: 892 ft (272 m)

Population (2020)
  - Total: 1,120
- Time zone: UTC-5 (Eastern (EST))
  - Summer (DST): UTC-4 (EDT)
- GNIS feature ID: 2628977

Thornport is a census-designated place in Perry County, in the U.S. state of Ohio. It is two miles north of Thornville and 22 miles north of the county seat of New Lexington. The population was 1,120 at the 2020 census.

== History ==
Thornport is an unincorporated village laid out by Dr. W. W. Talbott in 1839, when his private improvement company dug a private feeder canal to connect Thorn Township to the main body of Licking Summit Reservoir in Fairfield and Licking counties. Dr. Talbott and his wife's family, the Hoshors, owned a quarter section of land in Section 4, acquired from the US government and from which Thornport was platted. Thornport developed quickly in the early 19th century with the canal trade, with Thorn Township grain held at a large warehouse, and visitors staying at a large hotel. But after a mid-century storm, all fell to ruin, until a nearby railroad stabilized the pioneer village with traffic and visitors. At least one log cabin remains in Thornport, a testament to its early pioneer days and the canal trade. The Licking Summit Reservoir was since renamed Buckeye Lake.

Thornport is one of three villages which border Buckeye Lake, hence the "port" in its name. Nearby is the village of Thornville, established later and with numerous homes of the Victorian era.
