= Kobjeltak =

Coordinates: 7.063°N 171.551°E

Kobjeltak (Marshallese: Kōpjeltak, [kɤbʲ(e)zʲɛltˠɑk]) is one of the most populous islands in the Arno Atoll. It is part of the Marshall Islands in the Pacific Ocean.
