= Rearlaplap =

Part of the Marshall Islands

Coordinates: 7.087°N 171.907°E

Rearlaplap (Marshallese: Rear-ļapļap, [rˠɛɑːrlˠɑbʲ(ɛ)lˠɑpʲ]) is one of the most populous islands in the Arno Atoll. It is part of the Marshall Islands in the Pacific Ocean.
