= Buckeye Lake State Park =

Park in Ohio, USA

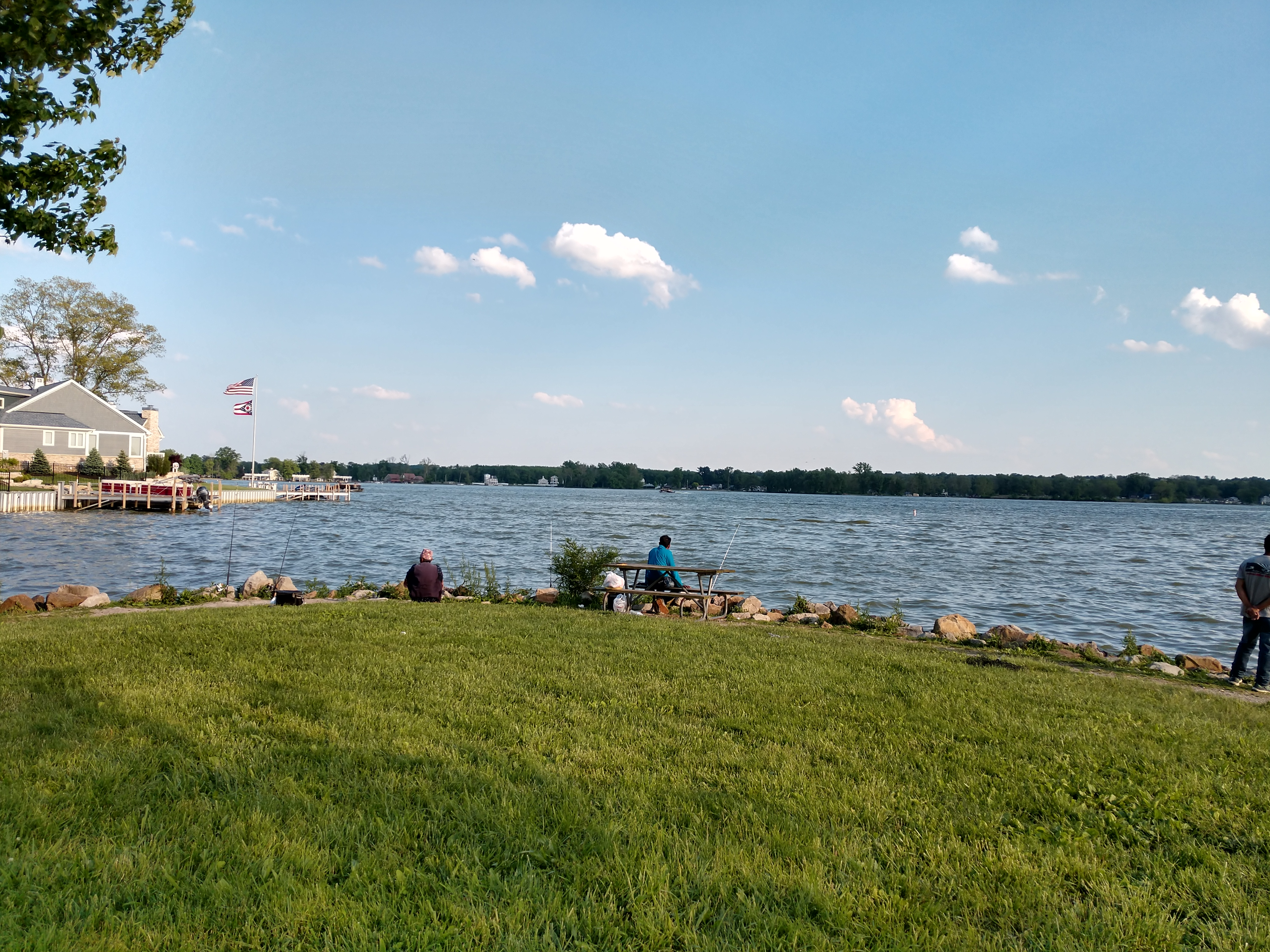
- Buckeye Lake

- Location within Ohio Location within the United States
- Interactive map of Buckeye Lake State Park
- Location: Fairfield, Licking, and Perry counties, Ohio, United States
- Coordinates: 39°55′47″N 82°26′50″W
- Area: Land: 176 acres (71 ha); Water: 3,173 acres (1,284 ha)
- Elevation: 886 ft (270 m)
- Established: 1949
- Administrator: Ohio Department of Natural Resources
- Designation: Ohio state park
- Website: Buckeye Lake State Park

Buckeye Lake State Park is a public recreation area in Fairfield, Licking and Perry counties, Ohio in the United States. The park consists of a 3,349 acres (1,355 ha) of shore areas, islands, and water. Shore areas and islands include Brooks Park, Fairfield Beach, Liebs Island, Mud Island and North Shore. Activities include boating, fishing, swimming, picnicking, wildlife observation. and winter recreation. Wildlife visible in or from the park include cormorants, herons, bald eagles, osprey, and numerous waterfowl.

== History ==
The park is named for Buckeye Lake, which under its original name, Licking Summit Reservoir, was built in the 19th century to supply water to the Ohio and Erie Canal. The project was started in 1826 and completed in 1830. After the 1894 Ohio General Assembly declared that feeder reservoirs should be established as public parks, the reservoir's name was changed to Buckeye Lake. In 1949, the area became Buckeye Lake State Park once the Ohio Department of Natural Resources was created.

Before the Licking Summit Reservoir was constructed, the area was a natural lake and wetlands system resulting from glaciation. In the 1700s, the area was a bog, referred to by the explorer Christopher Gist as "Great Swamp".
