= Tutu Island =

Coordinates: 7°27′N 168°56′E

Tutu (Marshallese: Tutu, [tˠuːdˠu]) is an island in the Ailinglaplap Atoll. It is located in the Marshall Islands in the Pacific Ocean.
