= Buckeye Lake (Ohio) =

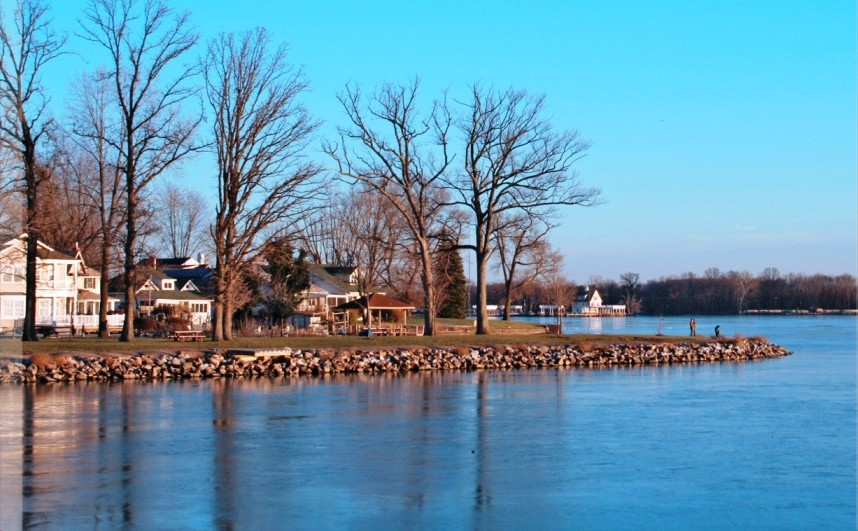

- Location within Ohio Location within the United States
- Location: Fairfield, Licking, and Perry counties, Ohio, USA
- Coordinates: 39°55′30″N 82°28′45″W
- Type: Reservoir
- Basin countries: United States
- Surface area: 3,173 acres (12.84 km^{2})
- Surface elevation: 892 ft (272 m)
- Islands: Round Island
- Settlements: Millersport, Buckeye Lake, Thornport

Buckeye Lake is a reservoir in Fairfield, Licking, and Perry counties in the U.S. state of Ohio. The lake was created in the 19th century as the "Licking Summit Reservoir", an important part of the Ohio and Erie Canal project. With the demise of the canal system in the early 20th century, usage of the lake shifted to recreation.

== History ==
As early as the 1750s, the area that would become Buckeye Lake was described as a great swamp known as "Buffalo Lick". The main Indian trails between the Ohio River and the Miami towns passed by this swamp. Construction of a dike to block the South Fork of the Licking River occurred between 1826 and 1830, to provide a source of water for the Ohio and Erie Canal.

In 1894, the Ohio State Legislature changed the reservoir's name to "Buckeye Lake". An amusement park and other recreation-oriented business developed, thrived and eventually declined as the 20th century proceeded. In 1949 Buckeye Lake was named a state park. Much of the area around the lake came to be used for vacation or permanent residences.

In March 2015, the Huntington District of the Army Corps of Engineers were paid $140,000 to release a structural inspection review, which identified numerous weaknesses in the lake's dam and warned that the lake was in imminent danger of a dam failure. Corps officials proposed a range of possible solutions, including doing nothing, completely replacing the dam or entirely draining the lake. As a result of the recommendation, Gov. John Kasich approved $150 million in funding to secure the dam. The dam was restored within three years and under budget at $107 million; a ribbon cutting ceremony was held on November 8, 2018.
