= Round Island (Nunavut) =

Uninhabited island in the Canadian Arctic

- Location within Nunavut Location within Canada

Geography
- Location: Northern Canada
- Coordinates: 72°09′N 74°39′W
- Archipelago: Arctic Archipelago

Administration
- Canada
- Territory: Nunavut
- Region: Qikiqtaaluk

Demographics
- Population: Uninhabited

Round Island is an uninhabited island in the Qikiqtaaluk Region of Nunavut, Canada. It is located across the mouth of Coutts Inlet in Baffin Bay off the northeastern coast of Baffin Island. Nova Zembla Island is 7.4 km (4.6 mi) to the northwest.

Another, smaller Nunavut Round Island is located in Cross Bay, at the land end of Chesterfield Inlet.
