= Round Island, Hong Kong =

Island in Hong Kong

Round Island
Native name: 銀洲
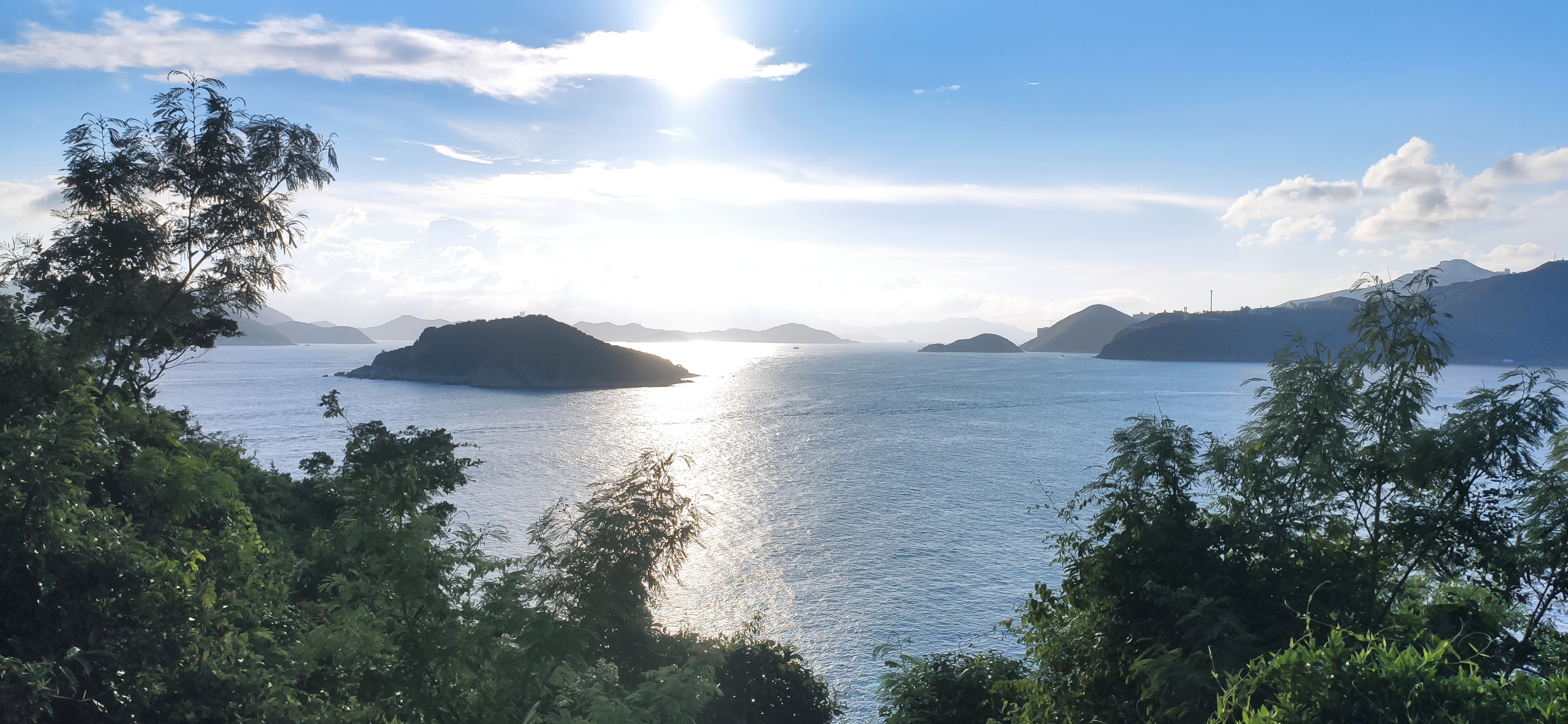
- Round Island

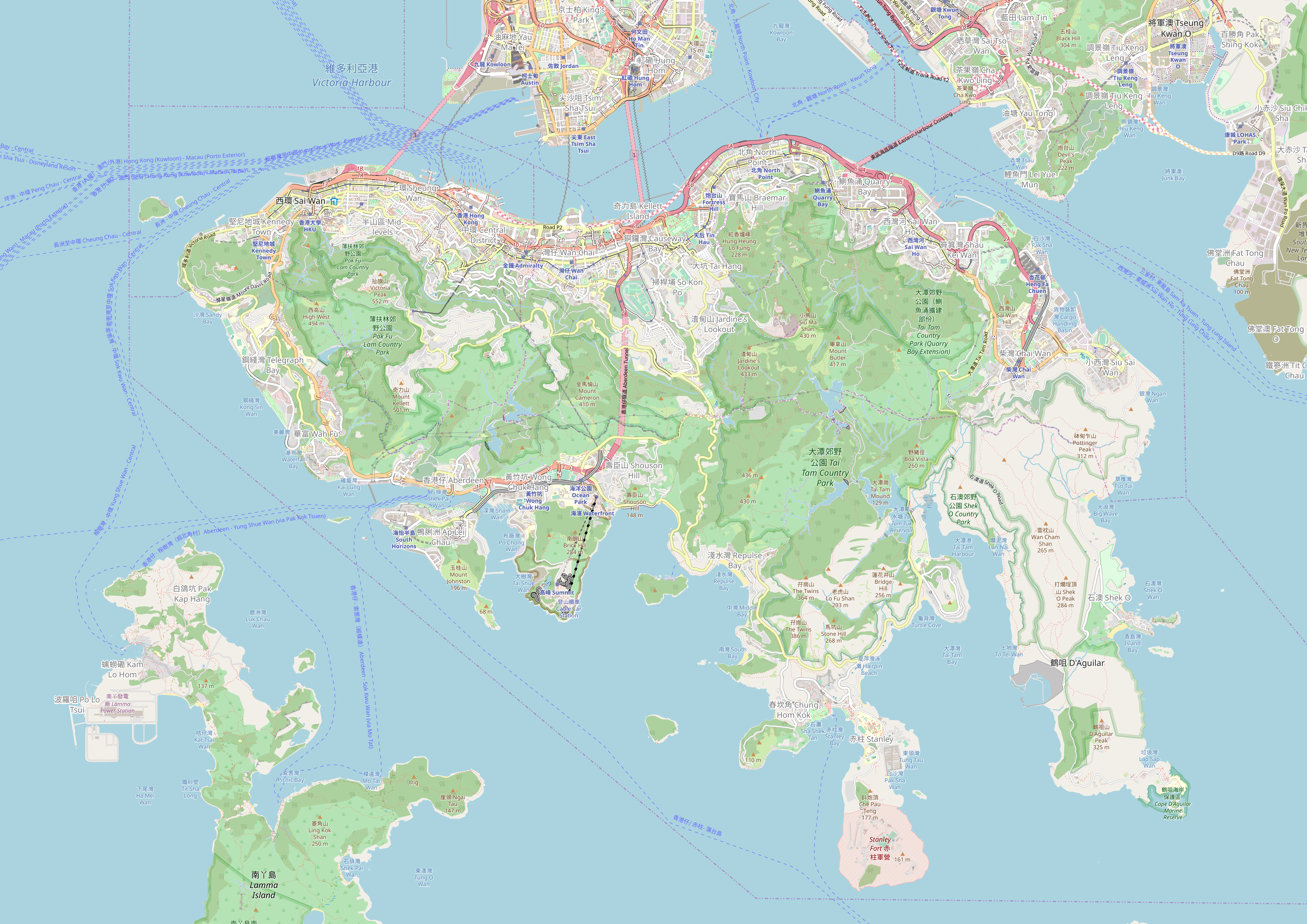
- Location within Hong Kong Island

Geography
- Location: Southern District
- Coordinates: 22.21588°N 114.18577°E
- Area: 0.17 km^{2} (0.066 sq mi)

Administration
- Hong Kong
- Districts: Southern District

Round Island or Ngan Chau (Chinese: 銀洲) is an island in Hong Kong. Administratively part of the Southern District, the island has an area of 0.17 km^{2}. An unmanned navigational beacon was constructed on the island in 1972.

== Geology ==
Round Island has a hilly terrain. The island's highest point is 49 metres over the sea. It stretches 0.6 km in north–south direction, and 0.5 km in east–west direction.

== Climate ==
The climate in the area is temperate. The yearly mean temperature in the region is 21 °C. The warmest month is August, when the mean temperature is 24 °C, and the coldest is February at 16 °C. The average yearly precipitation is 2150 mm. The rainiest month is May, with in average 538 mm precipitation, and the driest month is October, with 18 mm precipitation.

Round Island

Climate chart (precipitation, max. and min. temperature)
J	F	M	A	M	J	J	A	S	O	N	D
25 17 15	40 16 15	178 19 17	252 22 19	538 23 22	283 25 23	260 25 22	231 25 24	182 24 24	18 24 22	65 23 20	78 19 19
- █ Average max. and min. temperatures in °C
- █ Precipitation totals in mm
Imperial conversion
J	F	M	A	M	J	J	A	S	O	N	D
1 63 59	1.6 61 59	7 66 63	9.9 72 66	21 73 72	11 77 73	10 77 72	9.1 77 75	7.2 75 75	0.7 75 72	2.6 73 68	3.1 66 66
- █ Average max. and min. temperatures in °F
- █ Precipitation totals in inches
