= Round Island (Ohio) =

Island in Buckeye Lake, Ohio, United States

- Round Island, Ohio

- Location within Ohio

Geography
- Location: Buckeye Lake, Fairfield Beach, Walnut Township, Fairfield County, Ohio
- Coordinates: 39.919691°N 82.490153°W
- Total islands: 1
- Highest elevation: 274 m (899 ft)

Administration
- United States
- State: Ohio

Demographics
- Population: 1 (Island is currently for sale, and home on the island previously belonged to deceased Wendy's CEO, Dave Thomas. (2012)

Round Island, is a private island, located within Buckeye Lake, in Fairfield County, Ohio. In the 1920s, a cottage was built on the island, and in 1995 it was purchased and renovated by the late Dave Thomas, CEO and founder of Wendy's restaurants.
