= Round Island (Detroit River) =

Island in Michigan

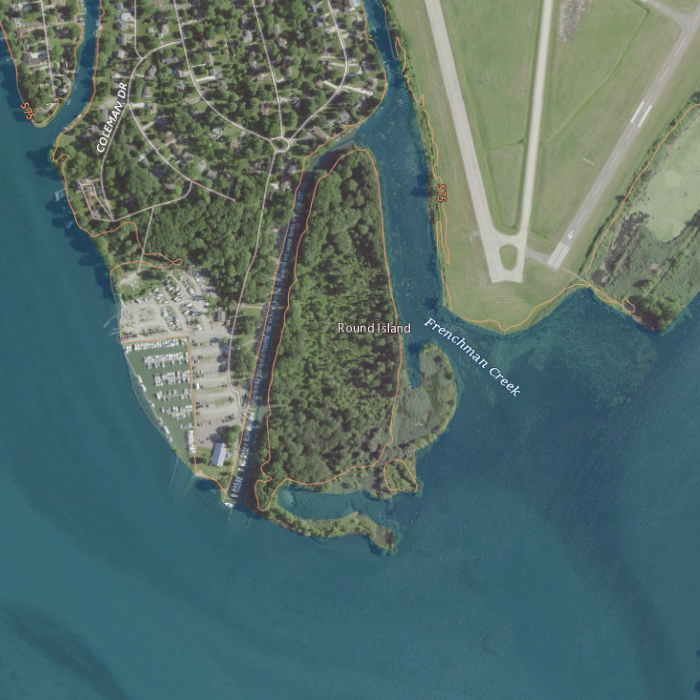
- USGS aerial imagery of Round Island

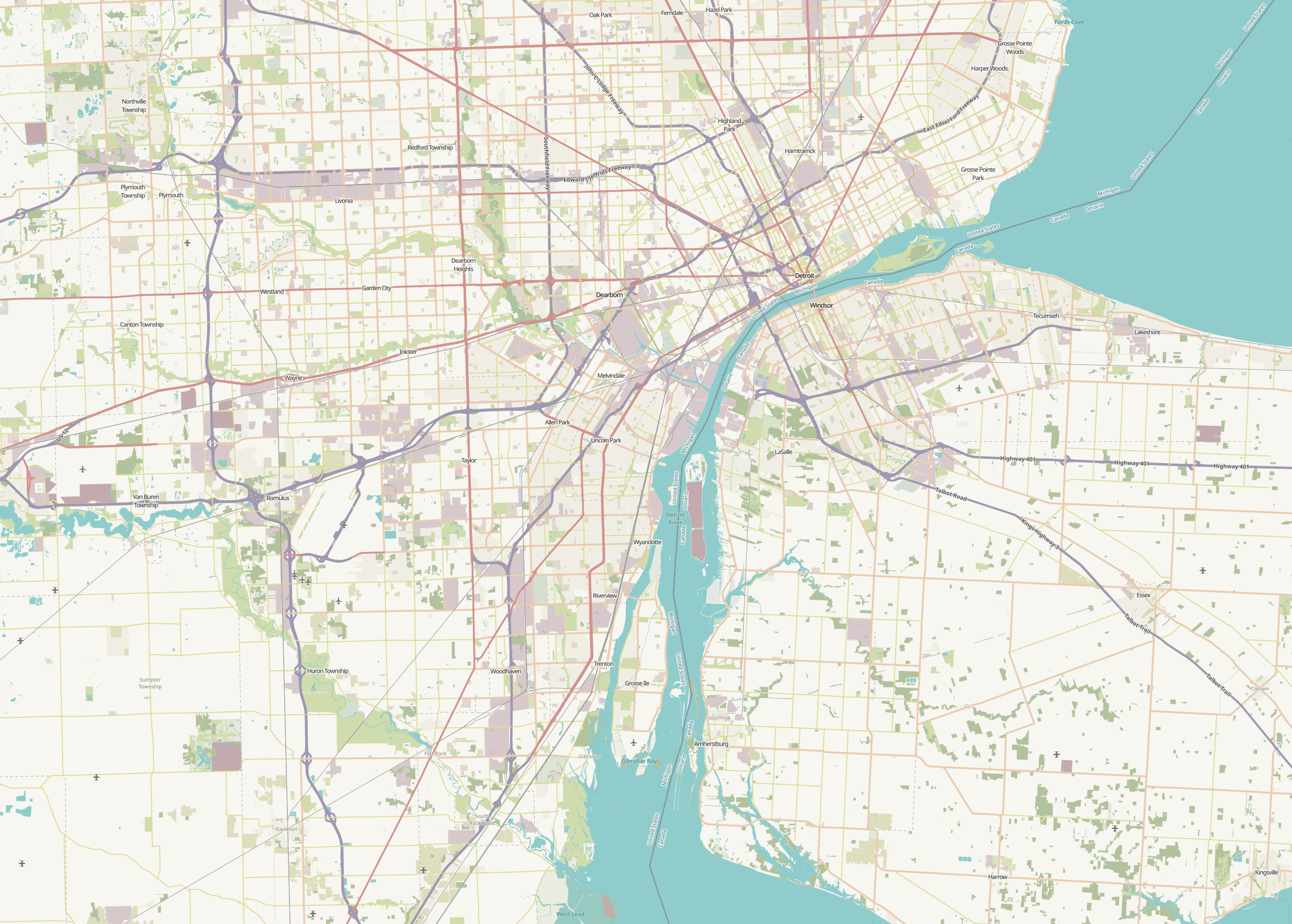
- Location within Wayne County, Michigan Location within Michigan Location within the United States

Geography
- Location: Michigan
- Coordinates: 42°05′32″N 83°10′02″W
- Highest elevation: 581 ft (177.1 m)

Administration
- United States
- State: Michigan
- County: Wayne

Round Island is an island in the Detroit River in southeast Michigan. It is part of Grosse Ile Township, in Wayne County. Its coordinates are 42°05′32″N 83°10′02″W, and the United States Geological Survey gave its elevation as 581 ft (177 m) in 1980.
