= Round Island (Tasmania) =

Coordinates: 39°13′43″S 146°59′51″E

Round Island is a granite island, with an area of 3.95 ha, in south-eastern Australia. It is part of Tasmania’s Hogan Group, lying in northern Bass Strait between the Furneaux Group and Wilsons Promontory in Victoria.

== Fauna ==
Recorded breeding seabird and wader species include little penguin, short-tailed shearwater, fairy prion, common diving petrel and Pacific gull. Reptiles present include White's skink and metallic skink.
