= Île Ronde, Brest =

Coordinates: 48°19′25″N 4°27′45″W

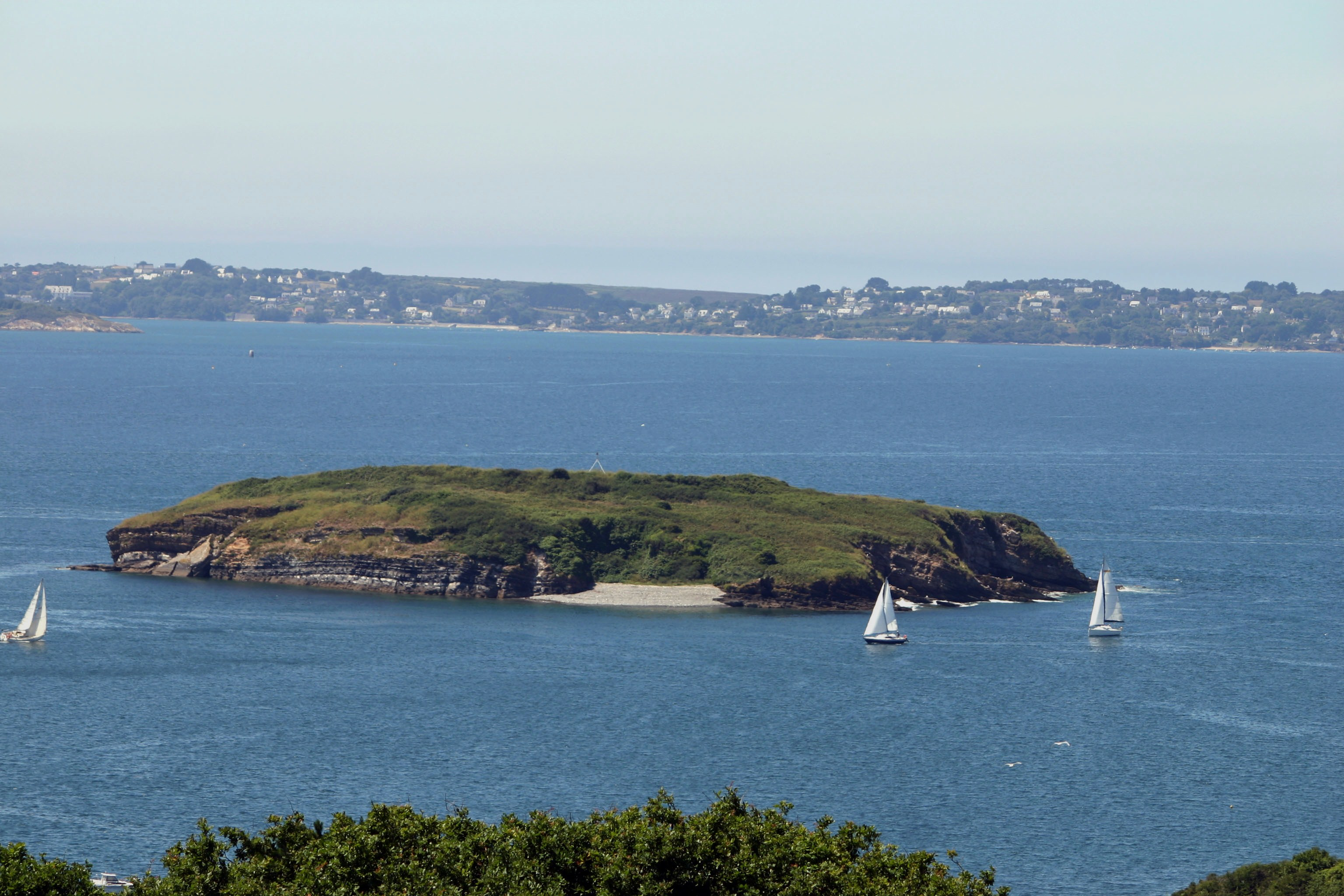
The Île Ronde, from the Pointe de l'Armorique.

The Île Ronde (literally Round Island; Breton: Enez Ront) is a French islet 400 metres (0.25 mi) to the south west of Pointe de l'Armorique, in the roadstead of Brest, within the territory of the commune of Plougastel-Daoulas. Its highest point is 24 m. Facing Île Ronde, on the pointe de l'Armorique, is the fort de la pointe de l'Armorique, built in 1775 for the defense of Brest.

== Ducs D'Albe ==
In the sea, 600 metres (0.37 mi) to the east of Île Ronde, are two dolphins, concrete cubes built by the German occupiers during World War II at a place where the water is 16 m deep. They were intended to host the German battleship Bismarck, but she was sunk in May 1941 before she could reach Brest and never used them. It seems these caissons were not intensively used.

The proximity of the channel separating Île Ronde from the pointe de l'Armorique gives rise to severe sea currents, making docking manoeuvres at this point difficult. Today unused, these concrete cubes have become inaccessible for humans and thus have become a haven for flora and fauna, including nests for common terns.
