= Buckeye Lake, Ohio =

- Village
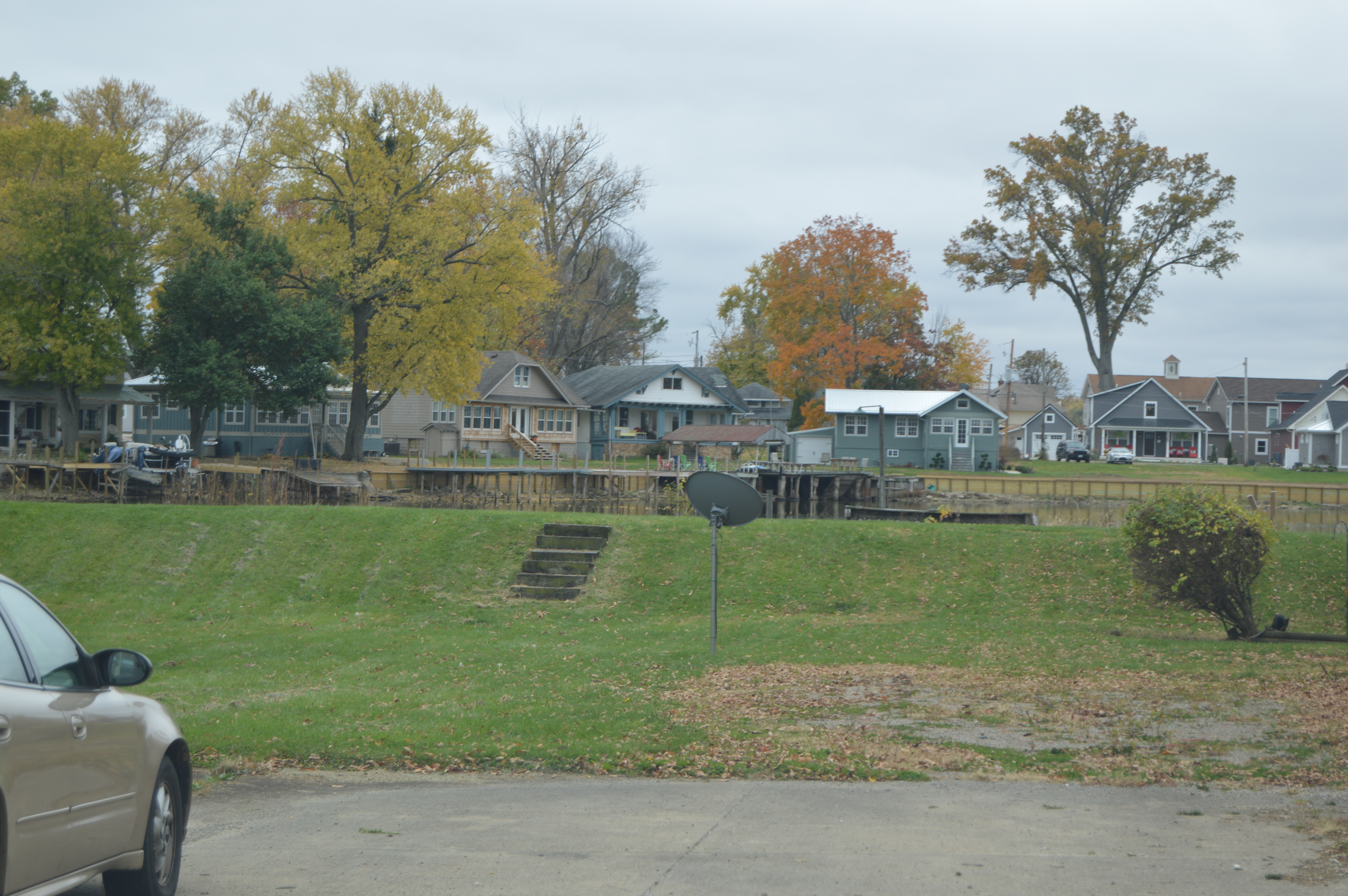
- Houses on the shore of Crane Lake

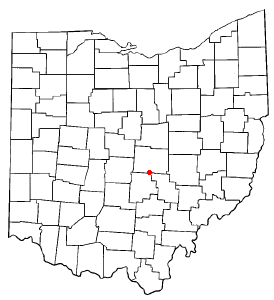
- Location of Buckeye Lake, Ohio

- Location of Buckeye Lake in Licking County (highlighted) and Fairfield County
- Coordinates: 39°55′52″N 82°29′32″W
- Country: United States
- State: Ohio
- Counties: Licking, Fairfield

Area
  - Total: 2.00 sq mi (5.17 km^{2})
  - Land: 1.97 sq mi (5.11 km^{2})
  - Water: 0.023 sq mi (0.06 km^{2})
- Elevation: 873 ft (266 m)

Population (2020)
  - Total: 2,520
  - Estimate (2023): 2,558
  - Density: 1,276.3/sq mi (492.79/km^{2})
- Time zone: UTC-5 (Eastern (EST))
  - Summer (DST): UTC-4 (EDT)
- ZIP code: 43008
- Area code: 740
- FIPS code: 39-09890
- GNIS feature ID: 2397482
- Website: buckeyelakevillage.com

Buckeye Lake is a village in Fairfield and Licking counties in the U.S. state of Ohio. The population was 2,520 at the 2020 census. It is named for Buckeye Lake, a large lake along which the village is built.

== History ==
On August 27, 2013, Buckeye Lake withdrew from Union Township in Licking County via a paper township named Buckeye Lake Township. Portions of Buckeye Lake within Fairfield County remain part of Walnut Township.

== Geography ==
According to the United States Census Bureau, the village has a total area of 2.02 square miles (5.23 km^{2}), of which 2.00 square miles (5.18 km^{2}) is land and 0.02 square miles (0.05 km^{2}) is water.

== Demographics ==
Historical population
Census	Pop.	Note	%±
1990	2,986		—
2000	3,049		2.1%
2010	2,746		−9.9%
2020	2,520		−8.2%
2023 (est.)	2,558	▲	1.5%
U.S. Decennial Census

=== 2010 census ===
As of the census of 2010, there were 2,746 people, 1,190 households, and 697 families living in the village. The population density was 1,373.0 inhabitants per square mile (530.1/km^{2}). There were 1,513 housing units at an average density of 756.5 per square mile (292.1/km^{2}). The racial makeup of the village was 96.6% White, 0.8% African American, 0.3% Native American, 0.3% Asian, 0.2% from other races, and 1.9% from two or more races. Hispanic or Latino of any race were 0.9% of the population.

There were 1,190 households, of which 27.5% had children under the age of 18 living with them, 35.2% were married couples living together, 15.5% had a female householder with no husband present, 7.9% had a male householder with no wife present, and 41.4% were non-families. 32.4% of all households were made up of individuals, and 11.8% had someone living alone who was 65 years of age or older. The average household size was 2.31 and the average family size was 2.90.

The median age in the village was 41.4 years. 22.7% of residents were under the age of 18; 8.6% were between the ages of 18 and 24; 24.5% were from 25 to 44; 30.9% were from 45 to 64; and 13.4% were 65 years of age or older. The gender makeup of the village was 48.6% male and 51.4% female.

=== 2000 census ===
As of the census of 2000, there were 3,049 people, 1,240 households, and 788 families living in the village. The population density was 1,497.8 inhabitants per square mile (578.3/km^{2}). There were 1,535 housing units at an average density of 754.0 per square mile (291.1/km^{2}). The racial makeup of the village was 97.05% White, 0.62% African American, 0.62% Native American, 0.13% Asian, 0.26% from other races, and 1.31% from two or more races. Hispanic or Latino of any race were 0.56% of the population.

There were 1,240 households, out of which 33.5% had children under the age of 18 living with them, 43.5% were married couples living together, 14.6% had a female householder with no husband present, and 36.4% were non-families. 27.3% of all households were made up of individuals, and 9.7% had someone living alone who was 65 years of age or older. The average household size was 2.46 and the average family size was 2.97.

In the village, the population was spread out, with 27.5% under the age of 18, 8.6% from 18 to 24, 29.1% from 25 to 44, 23.3% from 45 to 64, and 11.5% who were 65 years of age or older. The median age was 35 years. For every 100 females there were 95.8 males. For every 100 females age 18 and over, there were 90.5 males.

The median income for a household in the village was $28,889, and the median income for a family was $33,800. Males had a median income of $27,583 versus $19,881 for females. The per capita income for the village was $15,475. About 13.2% of families and 16.1% of the population were below the poverty line, including 19.1% of those under age 18 and 14.1% of those age 65 or over.

== Education ==
Buckeye Lake has a public library, a branch of the Licking County Library System.
