= Pak Sha Chau (North District) =

Island located in North District, Hong Kong

Native name: 白沙洲
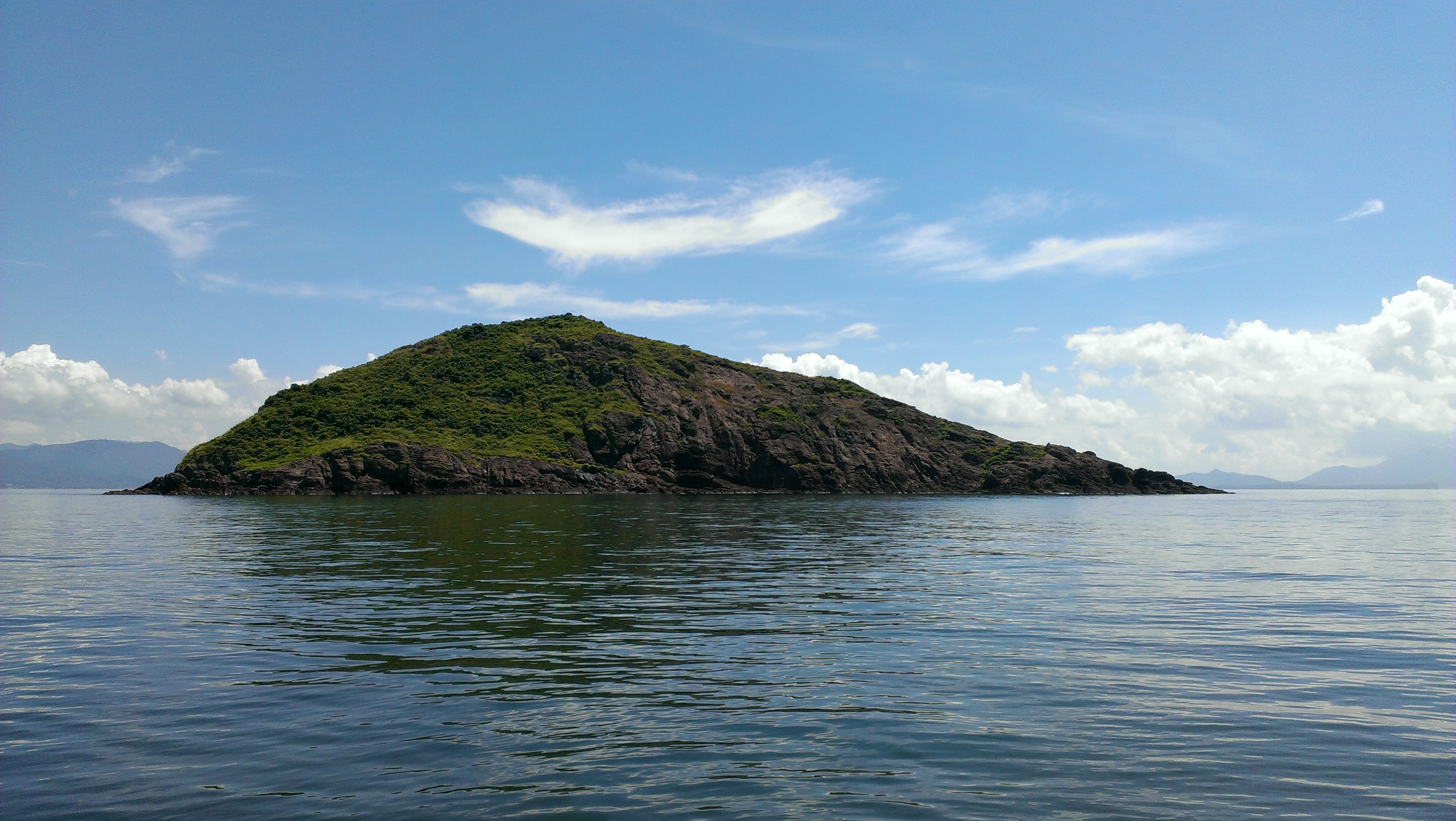
- Southwest-facing slope

- Location within Hong Kong

Geography
- Coordinates: 22.541455°N 114.330443°E

Administration
- Hong Kong
- Districts: North District

Round Island or Pak Sha Chau (Chinese: 白沙洲; pinyin: Báishā Zhōu) is an uninhabited island of Hong Kong. Administratively, it is part of the North District.

== See also ==
- Mirs Bay
