= Robert Alrutz =

Robert W. Alrutz
- Born: Robert Willard Alrutz; August 20, 1921; Pittsburgh, Pennsylvania, U.S.
- Died: October 14, 1997 (aged 76); Columbus, Ohio, U.S.
- Education: University of Pittsburgh (BS, 1943); University of Illinois (MS, 1947; PhD, 1952)
- Known for: Founding The Homestead at Denison University; Records of Ohio Odonata
- Scientific career
- Fields: Biology, entomology, parasitology, environmental studies
- Workplaces: Denison University

Robert Willard "Bob" Alrutz (August 20, 1921 – October 14, 1997) was an American biologist who taught at Denison University in Granville, Ohio, from 1952 to 1990.

He founded the university's Biological Reserve and the Homestead, a student-run intentional community, and its environmental studies program. Alrutz also published records of Ohio's dragonflies and damselflies and was active in state conservation, helping to protect Blackhand Gorge and Cranberry Bog; he received the Governor's Ohio Conservation Achievement Award in 1985.

In 1980, Alrutz published a reassessment of the Newark Holy Stones that archaeologists later linked to a revival of pseudoscientific claims about the artifacts.

== Early life and education ==
Alrutz was born in Pittsburgh, Pennsylvania, to Willard and Margaret Alrutz. During World War II he served in the United States Army and carried out a parasitological survey in the Pacific. He received a bachelor's degree in biology from the University of Pittsburgh in 1943, then earned a master's degree in 1947 and a PhD in 1952 in entomology at the University of Illinois.

== Career ==
Alrutz taught biology at Denison from 1952 until he retired in 1990. His courses included general zoology, environmental biology, vertebrate field zoology, entomology, and parasitology. From 1961 to 1966 he directed summer institutes in ecological studies. In the mid-1960s he led the founding of the university's Biological Reserve, an area of forest, grassland, and aquatic habitat east of campus used for teaching and research, and he directed it until his retirement. He founded Denison's environmental studies program and coordinated it from 1972 to 1990. From 1984 to 1990 he advised the university's recycling program, which he had helped students create.

=== Research on Ohio dragonflies ===
Alrutz's main research interest was the dragonflies and damselflies (Odonata) of Ohio. In the Ohio Journal of Science he published new state and county records in 1959 and a longer set of notes and records in 1961. Other researchers noted that the 1961 paper contained a complete bibliography of earlier work on Ohio Odonata, and they adopted its species numbering.

After his retirement he contributed to the Ohio Dragonfly Survey, which the Ohio Department of Natural Resources funded in 1991. In 1992 he reported 293 new county records for 65 species from 62 counties, based on specimens he had collected in the summer of 1961, and he published further records in 1993.

=== The Homestead ===
In 1977, Alrutz and a group of Denison students started the Homestead as an experiment in creating a self-reliant, democratic community based on agriculture. The plan met resistance from some neighbors, township officials, and two of his faculty colleagues. The university advanced $30,000 for the project, to be repaid by charging participants $540 a year. The project was originally expected to last five years. Students built three wooden cabins, the first in 1977. The cabins had no running water and were heated by wood stoves. Richard Downs, an alumnus who helped build the original cabins, later recalled that he and Alrutz worked on them while the students were in class, and that Alrutz was under pressure from the administration to make the site habitable. Denison's website quotes Alrutz as saying that "the best type of education is education that's grounded in experience."

Alrutz was one of the teachers of the original Homestead seminar, along with Paul Bennett, and he was the Homestead's faculty advisor until 1990. In a 1984 Associated Press story about the Homestead, he described it as one of the few institutions in the country, if not the only one, created and sustained entirely by students; according to the same article, residents called him "Daddy A".

His involvement declined over time, and by the mid-1990s the Homestead's ties to Denison's faculty had weakened. In 1996 the Homestead seminar drew up plans for a straw-bale community building, which was completed in 2001 and named "Cabin Bob" after Alrutz.

== Conservation work ==
Alrutz was a fellow of the Ohio Academy of Science and a former president of the Ohio Environmental Council. In 1963 the Ohio House of Representatives recognized his work to preserve Cranberry Island in Buckeye Lake. He played a key part in having Cranberry Bog declared a National Natural Landmark and in having Blackhand Gorge set aside as a state nature preserve. He also wrote the 1982 Ohio Environmental Resource Directory, a guide to the state's environmental agencies, organizations, and experts. Both sites are now protected as Cranberry Bog State Nature Preserve and Blackhand Gorge State Nature Preserve.

In 1985, Governor Richard F. Celeste presented him with the Ohio Department of Natural Resources' Governor's Ohio Conservation Achievement Award. He also received a certificate of recognition from the Ohio General Assembly in 1990 and the Ohio Alliance for the Environment's Environmental Education Achievement Award in 1991.

In 1968, Alrutz wrote to BioScience objecting to its publication of "Pesticides and the Environment", an article by Louis A. McLean of the Velsicol Chemical Corporation. He wrote that by publishing it the journal had "degraded a fine journal".

== Newark Holy Stones ==
Alrutz also researched the Newark Holy Stones, a group of Hebrew-inscribed artifacts reported to have been found near Newark, Ohio, in the 1860s. Archaeologists had dismissed them as forgeries by 1881 at the latest. The stones, then largely forgotten in the Johnson-Humrickhouse Museum, came to his attention in 1974. A 1977 Associated Press report described him as studying the stones as a hobby, without archaeological training, in the hope that scholars would reexamine them.

In 1980, he published a study in Denison's Journal of the Scientific Laboratories arguing that the stones had been condemned as fraudulent prematurely. He argued that David Wyrick, who found the first stones, was not an impostor and had been unjustly maligned by Charles Whittlesey, and that the stones might therefore be authentic. He promoted the study in public lectures, often bringing the original artifacts, which he borrowed from the museum.

Jennifer Bush, Reba Kocher, and Bradley Lepper accept Alrutz's defense of Wyrick but write that analysis of its inscription has shown the Decalogue Stone to be a 19th-century forgery. They describe Alrutz as a Young Earth creationist who appears to have found the stones appealing because they placed American prehistory within a fundamentalist biblical framework. Gill, Lepper, and Meghan Marley write that his reassessment directly led to a revival of pseudoscientific claims about the stones, including a 2010 documentary and a 2013 episode of America Unearthed.

== Personal life and death ==
Alrutz was married to Wilma (Schmoock) Alrutz for 51 years, and they had one daughter. He died at Riverside Hospital in Columbus, Ohio, on October 14, 1997. Memorial gifts were directed to the Robert Willard Alrutz Internship Fund at Denison.

== Selected publications ==
- Alrutz, Robert W. (1959). "New Records for Ohio Dragonflies (Odonata: Anisoptera)". Ohio Journal of Science. 59 (6): 339–340.
- Alrutz, Robert W. (1961). "Notes and Records of Ohio Dragonflies and Damselflies (Odonata)". Ohio Journal of Science. 61 (1): 13–24.
- Alrutz, Robert W. (1980). "The Newark Holy Stones: The History of an Archaeological Tragedy". Journal of the Scientific Laboratories, Denison University. 57: 1–57.
- Alrutz, Robert W. (1992). "Additional Records of Dragonflies (Odonata) from Ohio". Ohio Journal of Science. 92 (4): 119–120.
- Alrutz, Robert W. (1993). "An Annotated List of New Seasonal and County Records for Ohio Dragonflies (Odonata)". Ohio Journal of Science. 93: 105–108.
