= Denison University =

Private college in Granville, Ohio, United States

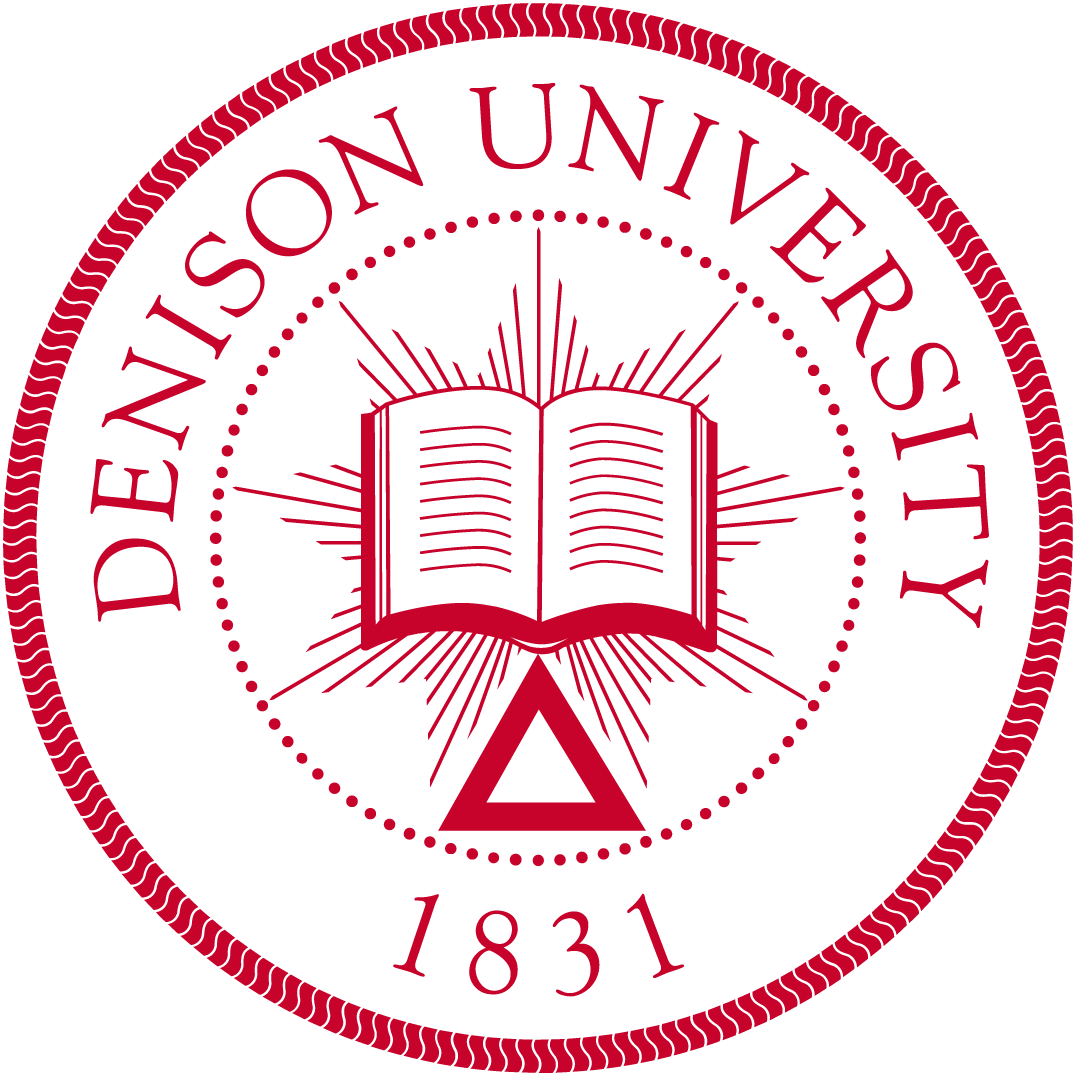
- Former names: Granville Literary and Theological Institution (1831–1845); Granville College (1845–1853)
- Type: Private liberal arts college
- Established: December 13, 1831; 194 years ago
- Academic affiliations: Five Colleges of Ohio; Great Lakes Colleges Association; Annapolis Group; Oberlin Group; Consortium of Liberal Arts Colleges
- Endowment: $1.1 billion (2025)
- President: Adam S. Weinberg
- Provost: Alisa Rosenthal
- Faculty: 292
- Undergraduates: 2,400
- Location: Granville, Ohio, United States; 40.0722°N 82.5225°W
- Campus: 930 acres (3.8 km^{2}) including a 360-acre (1.5 km^{2}) biological reserve
- Colors: Red & white
- Nickname: Big Red
- Sporting affiliations: NCAA Division III – NCAC
- Website: www.denison.edu

Denison University is a private liberal arts college in Granville, Ohio, United States. One of the earliest colleges established in the former Northwest Territory, Denison University was founded in 1831. It was first called the Granville Literary and Theological Institution, later took the name Granville College, and, in the mid-1850s, was renamed Denison University, in honor of William S. Denison, a major early benefactor. The college enrolled 2,400 students in fall 2025. Students choose from 65 academic programs and 4 pre-professional programs.

The college's intercollegiate athletic teams compete in the North Coast Athletic Conference, fielding 26 varsity teams in the NCAA Division III. Denison is a member of the Five Colleges of Ohio and the Great Lakes Colleges Association.

== History ==
On December 13, 1831, John Pratt, the college's first president and a graduate of Brown University, inaugurated classes at the Granville Literary and Theological Institution. Situated on a 200-acre (81 ha) farm south of the village of Granville; it was the second Baptist college west of the Allegheny mountains after Georgetown College, which was founded in 1829. While rooted in theological education, the institution offered students the same literary and scientific instruction common to other colleges of the day. The first term included 37 students, 27 of whom hailed from Granville; nearly half of these students were under fifteen years of age. The school's first Commencement, which graduated three classics majors, was held in 1840.

In 1845, the institution, which at this point was male-only, officially changed its name to Granville College. In 1853, William S. Denison, a Muskingum County farmer, pledged $10,000 toward the college's endowment. Honoring an earlier commitment, the trustees accordingly changed the name of the institution to Denison University. They also voted to move the college to land then available for purchase in the village of Granville.

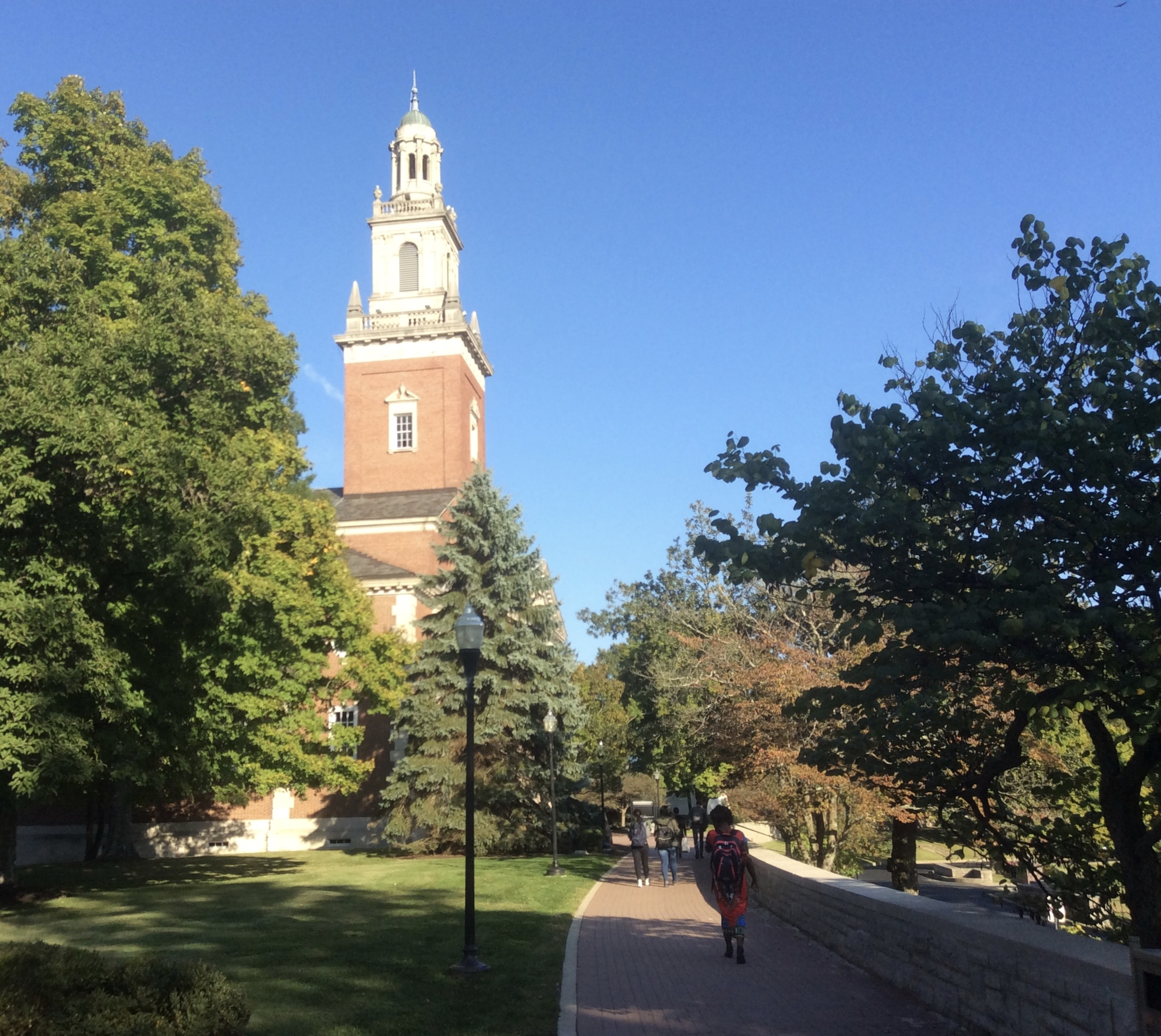
Swasey Chapel (1924)

In the years leading up to the Civil War, many students and faculty members at Denison University became deeply involved in the anti-slavery movement. Asa Drury, the chair of Greek and Latin studies, became the leader of a local anti-slavery society. Bancroft House, now a residential hall, served as a stop on the Underground Railroad for refugee slaves.

Granville Female Seminary was founded in 1832, a year before Oberlin College launched the first coeducational college in the United States. The seminary was superseded by the Young Ladies' Institute, founded in 1859. The Young Ladies' Institute was renamed Shepardson College for Women in 1886. Shepardson College was fully incorporated into Denison University after a transitional phase in 1927.

In 1887, Denison inaugurated a master's program, with resident graduates pursuing advanced studies in the sciences. In 1926, the board of trustees formalized a new curriculum that made Denison University an exclusively undergraduate institution.

In the wake of Shepardson College's incorporation, Denison University enlarged its campus. In 1916, the college hired the Frederick Law Olmsted & Sons architectural firm. The resulting "Olmsted Plan" laid a foundation for expansion that has remained the guiding aesthetic for subsequent growth. Expansion during this period included the acquisition of land to the north and east, the relocation of Shepardson College to the east ridge of College Hill, and the development of a new men's quadrangle beyond the library.

While the college's origins were rooted in theological education, Denison University has been a non-sectarian institution since the 1960s. By 2005, the college reached its present size of approximately 2,250 students.

=== Presidents ===
Denison has had eighteen presidents from 1831 to present.

- Adam S. Weinberg 2013-Present
- Dale T. Knobel 1998-2013
- Michele Tolela Myers 1989–1998
- Andrew G. De Rocco 1984-1988
- Robert C. Good 1976-1984
- Joel P. Smith 1969-1976
- A. Blair Knapp 1951-1968
- Kenneth I. Brown 1940-1950
- Avery A. Shaw 1927-1940
- Clark W. Chamberlain 1913-1927
- Emory W. Hunt 1901-1912
- Daniel B. Purinton 1890-1901
- Galusha Anderson 1887-1889
- Alfred Owen 1879–1886
- Elisha Andrews 1875-1879
- Samson Talbot 1863-1873
- Jeremiah Hall 1853-1863
- Silas Bailey 1846-1852
- Jonathan Going 1837-1844
- John Pratt 1831-1837

== Campus ==
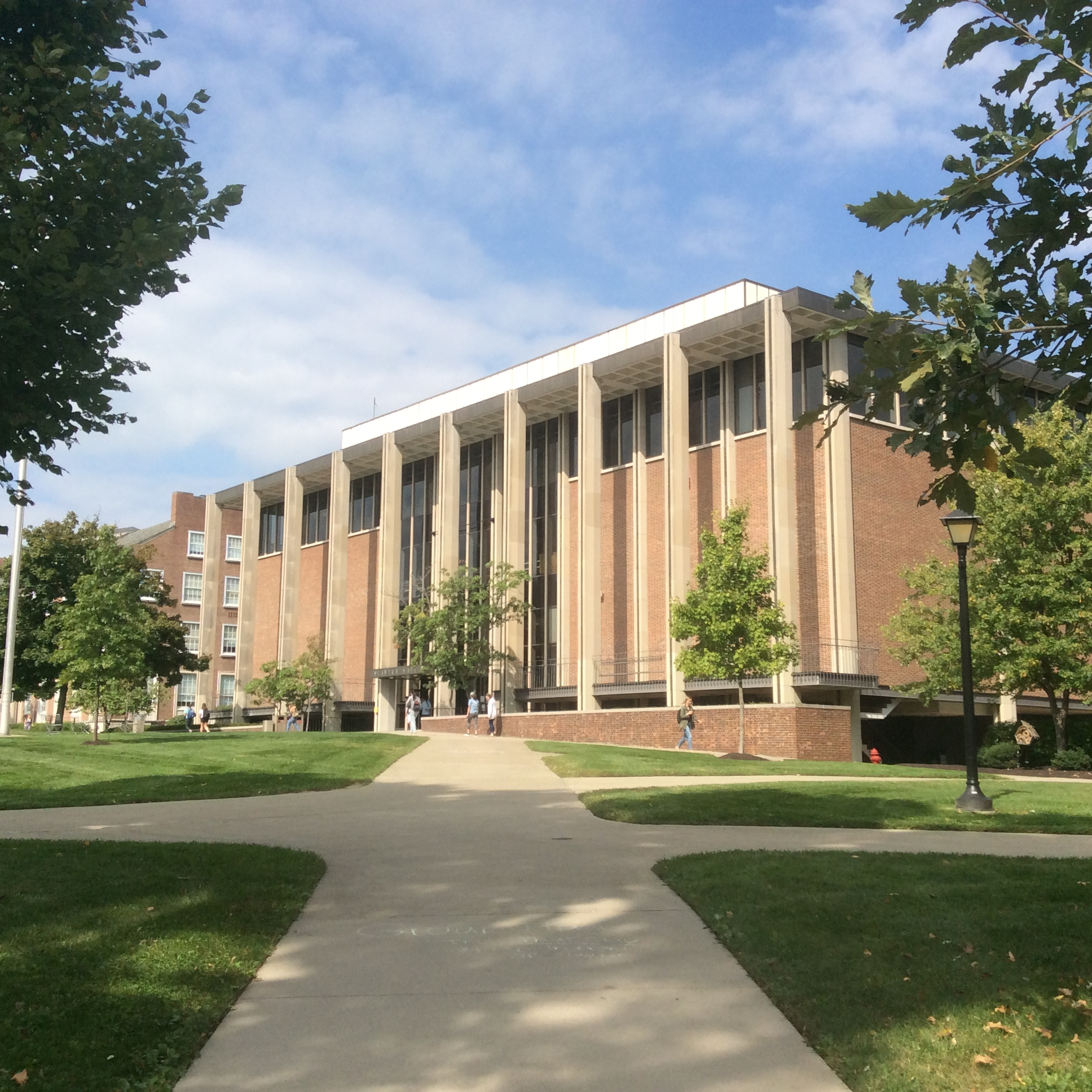
Slayter Hall Student Union (1962)

The campus size is about 1,100 acres (450 ha). This includes a 400-acre (160 ha) biological reserve just east of campus, where professors of sciences, such as geology and biology, can hold class. The Denison Golf Club at Granville, an 18-hole course designed by Donald Ross, is just 0.4 miles (0.64 km) from the academic campus and was donated to the university in 2014. In 2013, the university purchased and renovated the historic Granville Inn.

The first building in the "Greater Denison" plan, Swasey Chapel, was built at the center of the campus. The chapel seats 990 and plays host to notable campus events such as baccalaureate services, lectures, concerts, and academic award convocations.

There are 18 academic buildings on campus. Burton Morgan is also on academic quad (spill-over academic building), but it serves administrative purposes. Doane Administration Building, one of the oldest buildings on campus, has been renovated to be Knobel Hall, the new home of data analytics. The Bryant Arts Center opened in August 2009. The Michael D. Eisner Center for the Performing Arts was completed in 2019.

Doane Library today houses more than 500,000 books and bound periodicals.

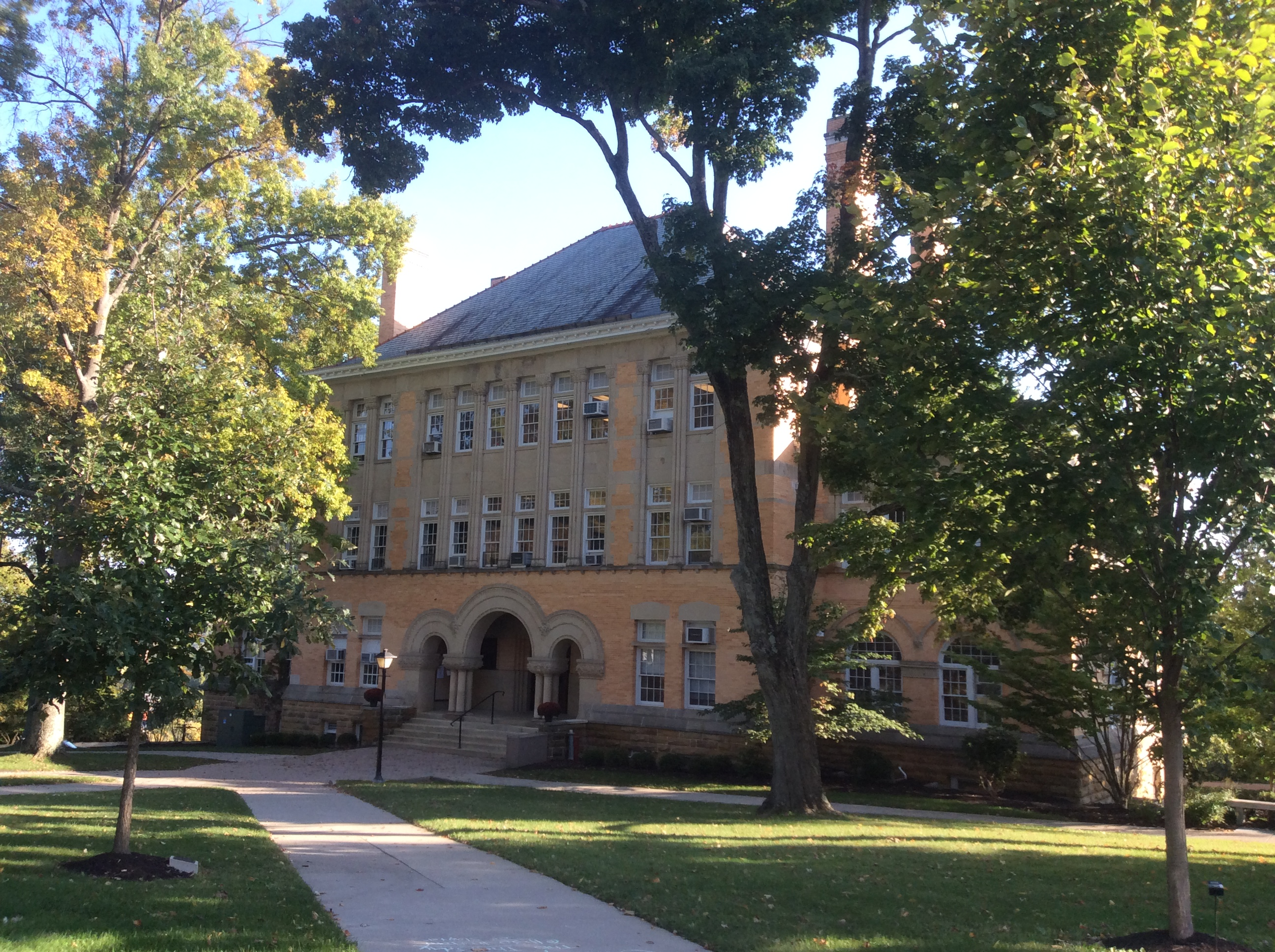
Doane Administration (1895)

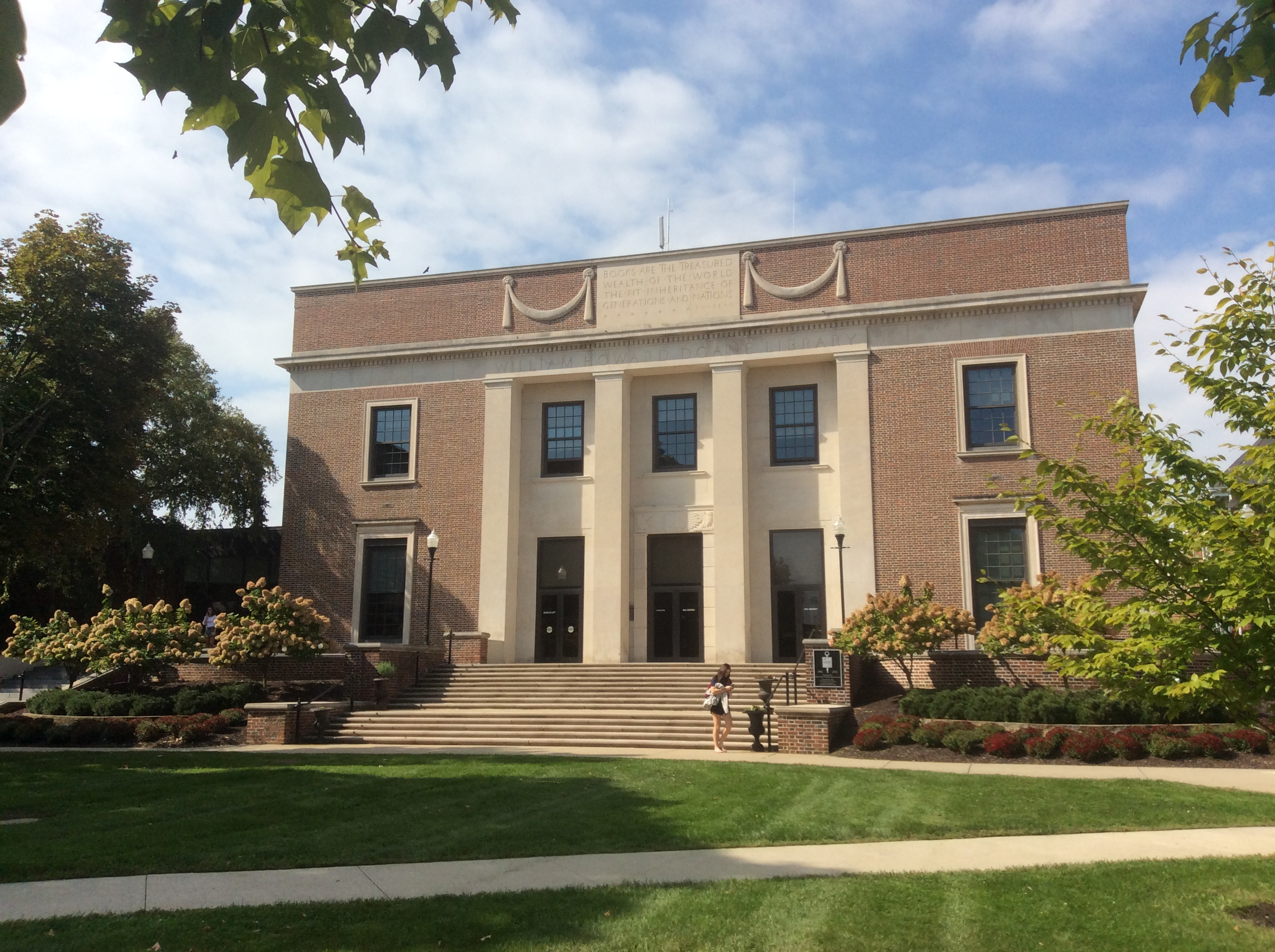
William Howard Doane Library (1937)

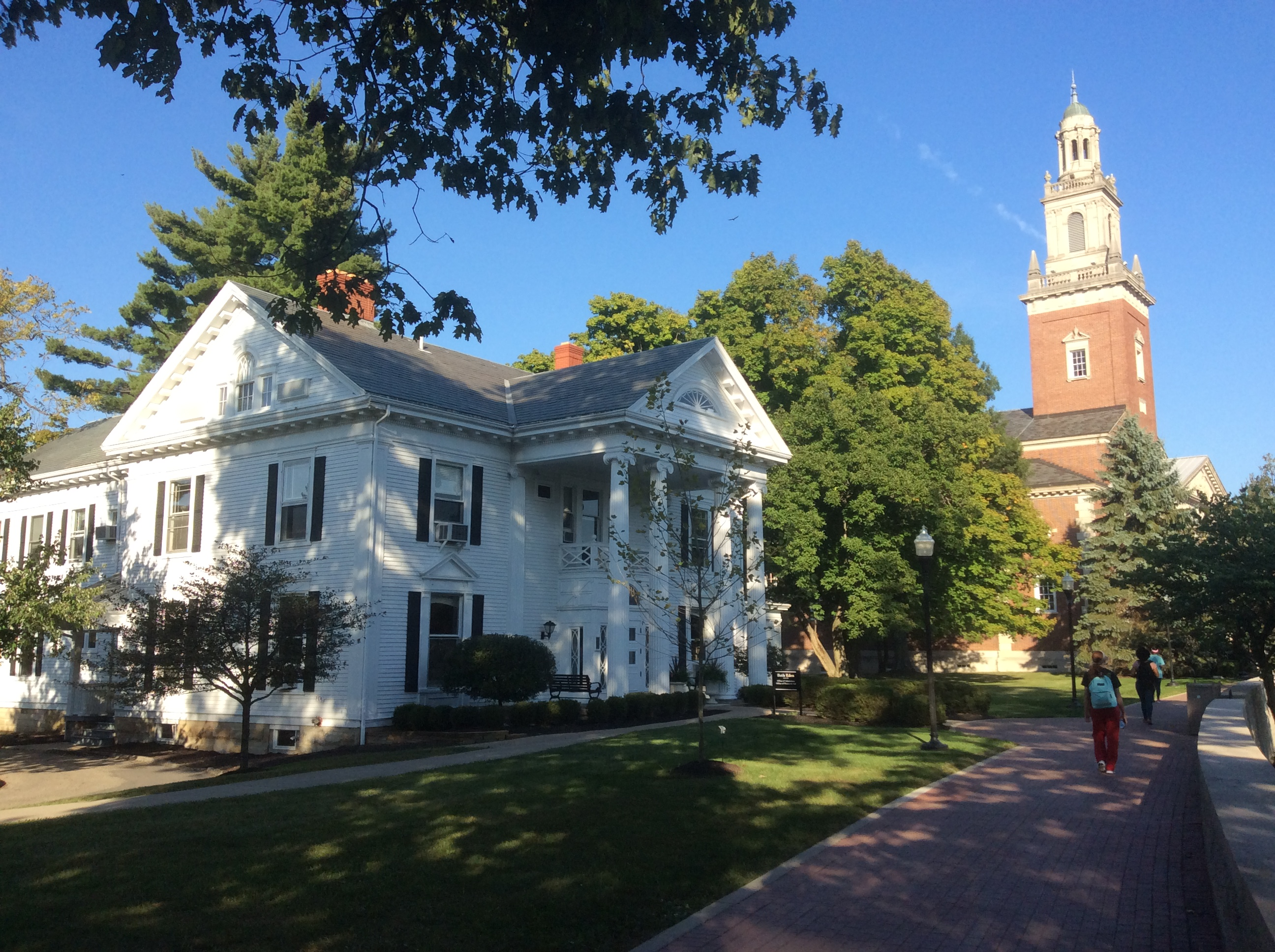
Beth Eden (1901) and Swasey Chapel (1924)

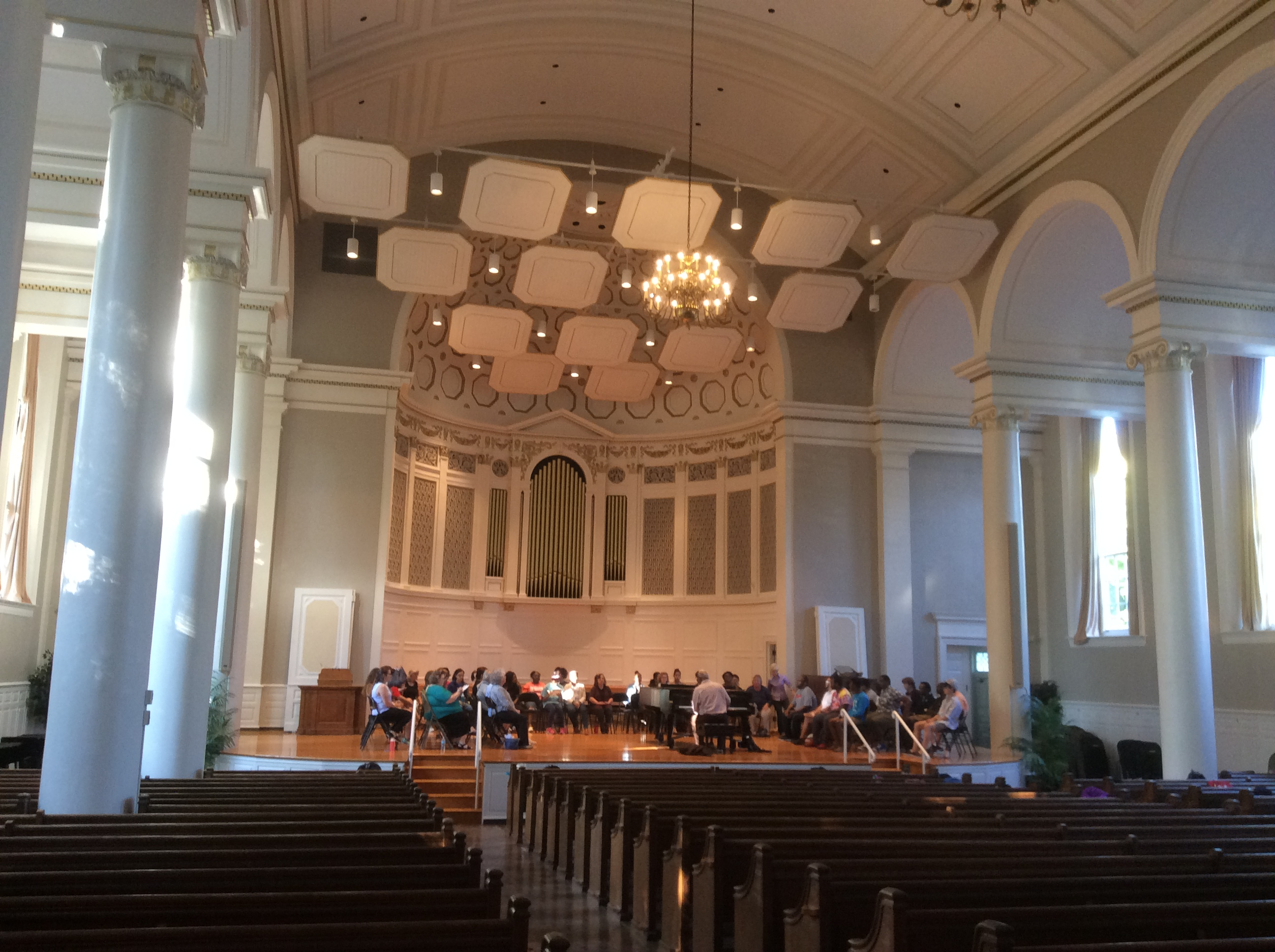
Swasey Chapel (1924, inside)

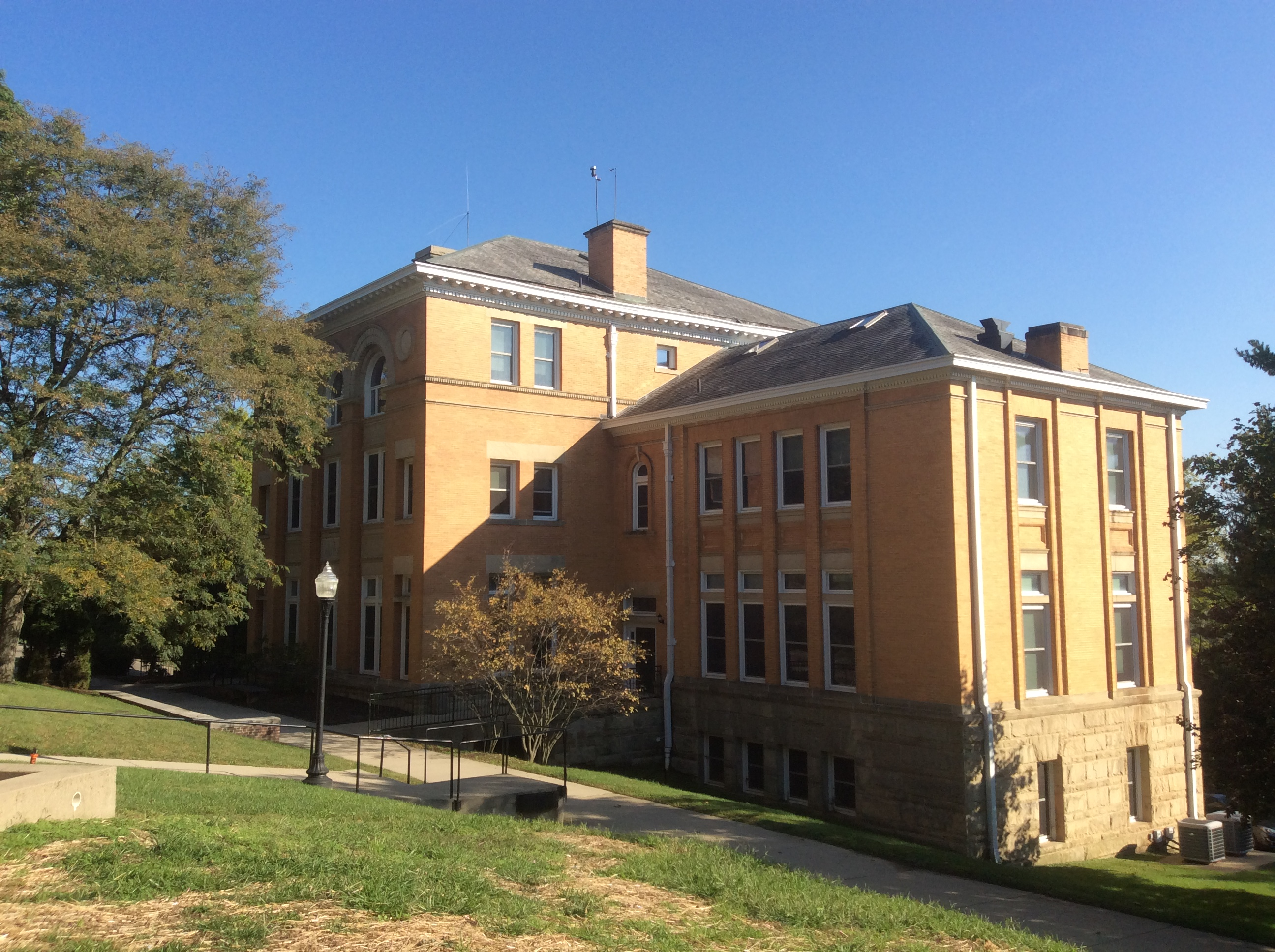
Barney Davis Hall (1894)

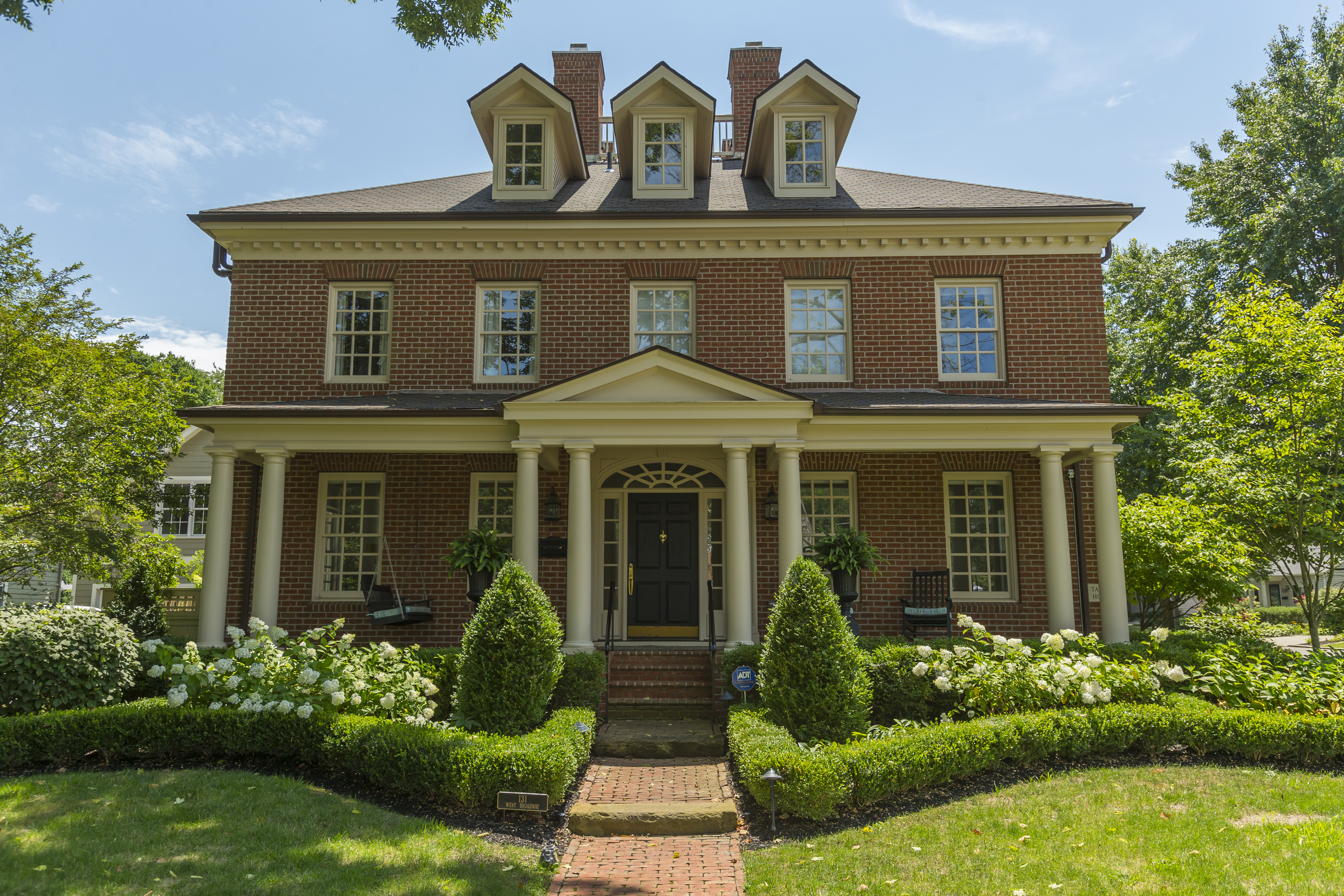
131 W Broadway is home to the Denison University President and family.

Swasey Observatory, which opened in June 1910, houses a 9-inch refracting telescope as well as two 8-inch reflecting telescopes.

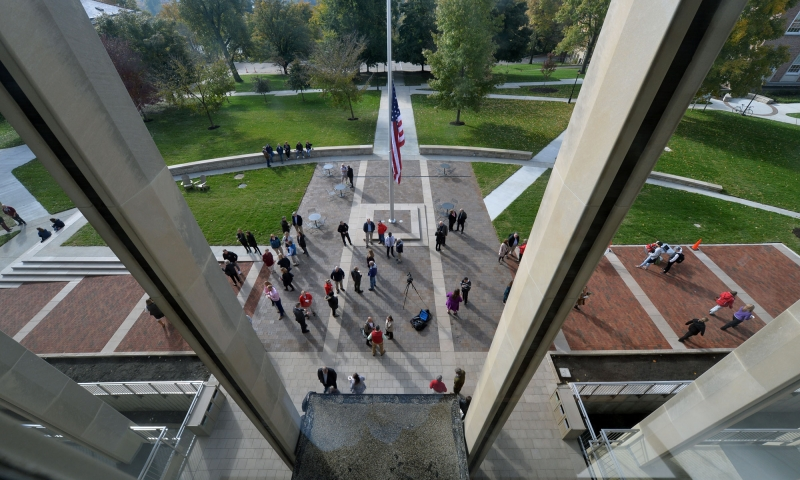
Denison A-Quad after renovations in 2018.

The campus landscape was designed by the Olmsted Brothers firm. "Greater Denison" was designed based on a layout of quadrangles throughout upper campus, designed to mirror the building functions. This was envisioned to help foster a sense of community among campus groups.

== Students ==
As of the 2025–2026 school year, 2,400 students are enrolled at Denison, with a gender distribution of 49 percent male students and 51 percent female students. They come from all 50 states, Washington, DC; and 73 countries, with 78% from out-of-state. A full-time faculty of 292 professors makes the student-to-faculty ratio 9:1.

Thirteen percent of students are first-generation college students, and 37% are multicultural students. Denison was cited by The New York Times in 2014 as one of America's "Most Economically Diverse Top Colleges." In that list, Denison is ranked at No. 11 in the list of the nation's top colleges and universities.

The endowment was stated at over $1 billion in 2023, with an endowment per student of slightly over $400,000. While the university will "meet 100% of all demonstrated need," the annual cost of attending is $92,400 for the 2026–2027 academic year. Denison awards nearly $70 million in financial aid each year.

== Academics ==
Denison's most popular majors, by 2021 graduates, were:

- Econometrics & Quantitative Economics (66)
- Biology/Biological Sciences (55)
- Mass Communication/Media Studies (38)
- International Business/Trade/Commerce (29)
- Research & Experimental Psychology (27)

=== Admissions ===
On its website, Denison University says it is one of the few universities that guarantees it will meet the financial needs of all admitted students (including international students). The university is need-blind for domestic applicants.

In the admission season for fall 2023 entry, there were more than 14,500 applicants, with an admission rate of 17%. Recent trends show an expanding interest from international student populations, with application submissions increasing from 2,447 in 2019 to 3,255 in 2021. Enrollment among international students has also increased during this period, from 97 newly enrolled international students to 131 over the three-year span. Among freshman students who committed to enrolling in Fall 2021, composite SAT scores for the middle 50% ranged from 1330 to 1550, while composite ACT scores for the middle 50% ranged from 30 to 35. Denison practices test-optional admissions. Consequently, the SAT and ACT information reported is not based on the entire student body and instead reflects the middle 50% of only those students who opted to provide their test scores. In Fall 2021, 76% of enrolled freshmen were in the top 10% of their high school classes. U.S. News & World Report categorizes Denison as "most selective". Roughly 15 percent of the incoming class are admitted through athlete recruits. Denison University implements the holistic review admissions process. In addition to the standard results, extracurricular activities, awards, honors, character, community contributions, enthusiasm, specialties, etc. are criteria that are factored into the application process.

In January 2021, Denison University announced it has been selected as a QuestBridge partner college, joining what is currently a group of 55 universities in the country participating in the program as of April 2025.

== Rankings ==
Academic rankings

Liberal arts
- U.S. News & World Report: 34
- Washington Monthly: 36

National
- WSJ/College Pulse: 114

Denison was ranked tied for 34th in liberal arts college the U.S. by the 2025 U.S. News & World Report Best Colleges Ranking, which also ranked Denison in the “Most Innovative Schools” category. The college also received an “A” overall grade from Niche, who also ranked them as the 42nd best liberal arts college in the country. In 2025, Washington Monthly ranked Denison 36th among all liberal arts colleges in the U.S. based on its contribution to the public good, as measured by social mobility, research, and promoting public service.

Although the Princeton Review does not give colleges overall ratings, it ranked Denison in 2026 as having the 2nd happiest students, the 2nd best career services, the 4th best classroom experience, and the 6th best quality of life compared with all colleges in the country.

== Student life ==
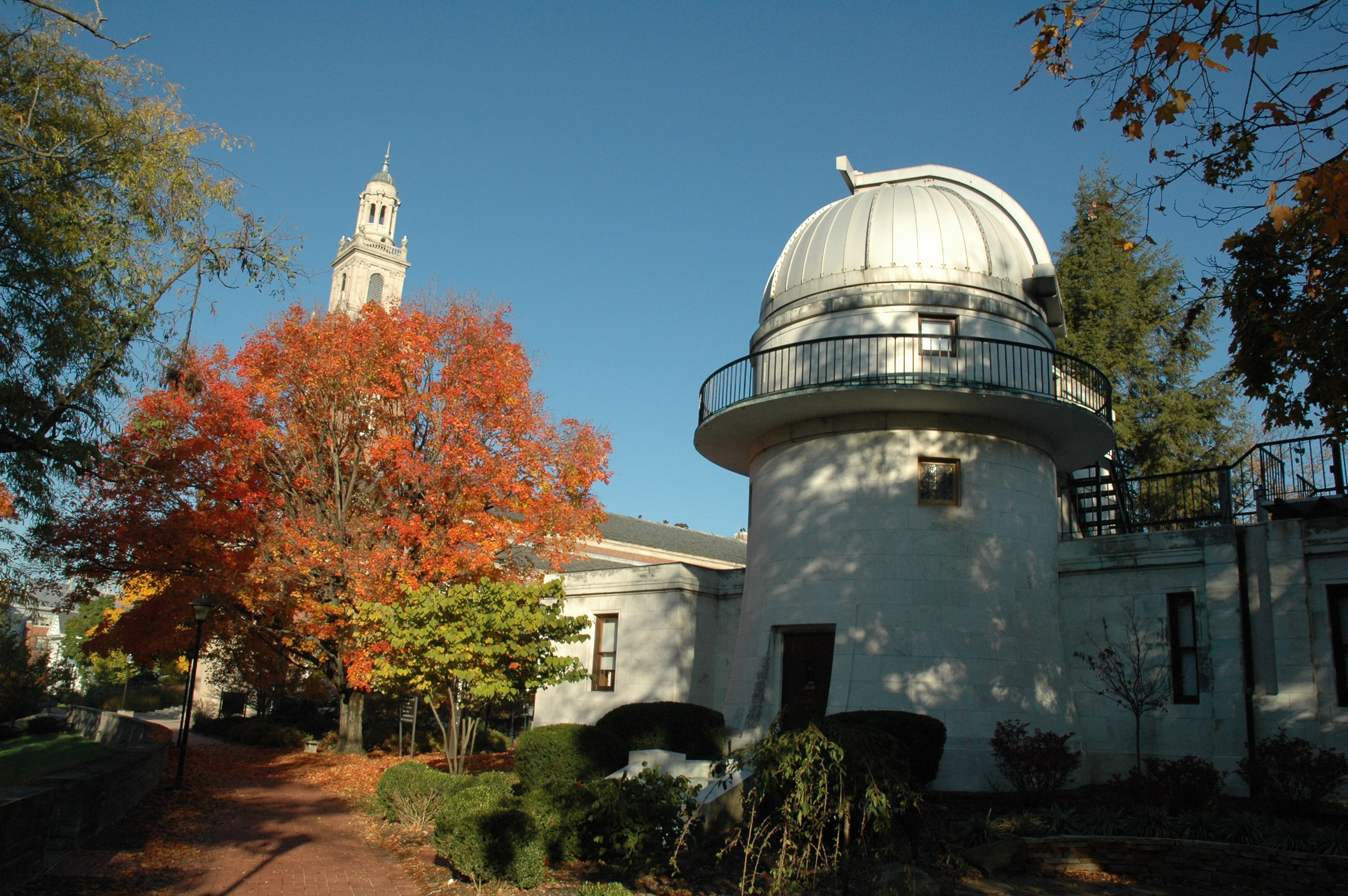
Swasey Observatory (foreground) and Swasey Chapel (background)

Denison is a strictly residential campus that features a mixture of historic and contemporary buildings. The Homestead at Denison University is a soon-to-be-closed non-traditional housing option.

=== Student organizations and involvement ===
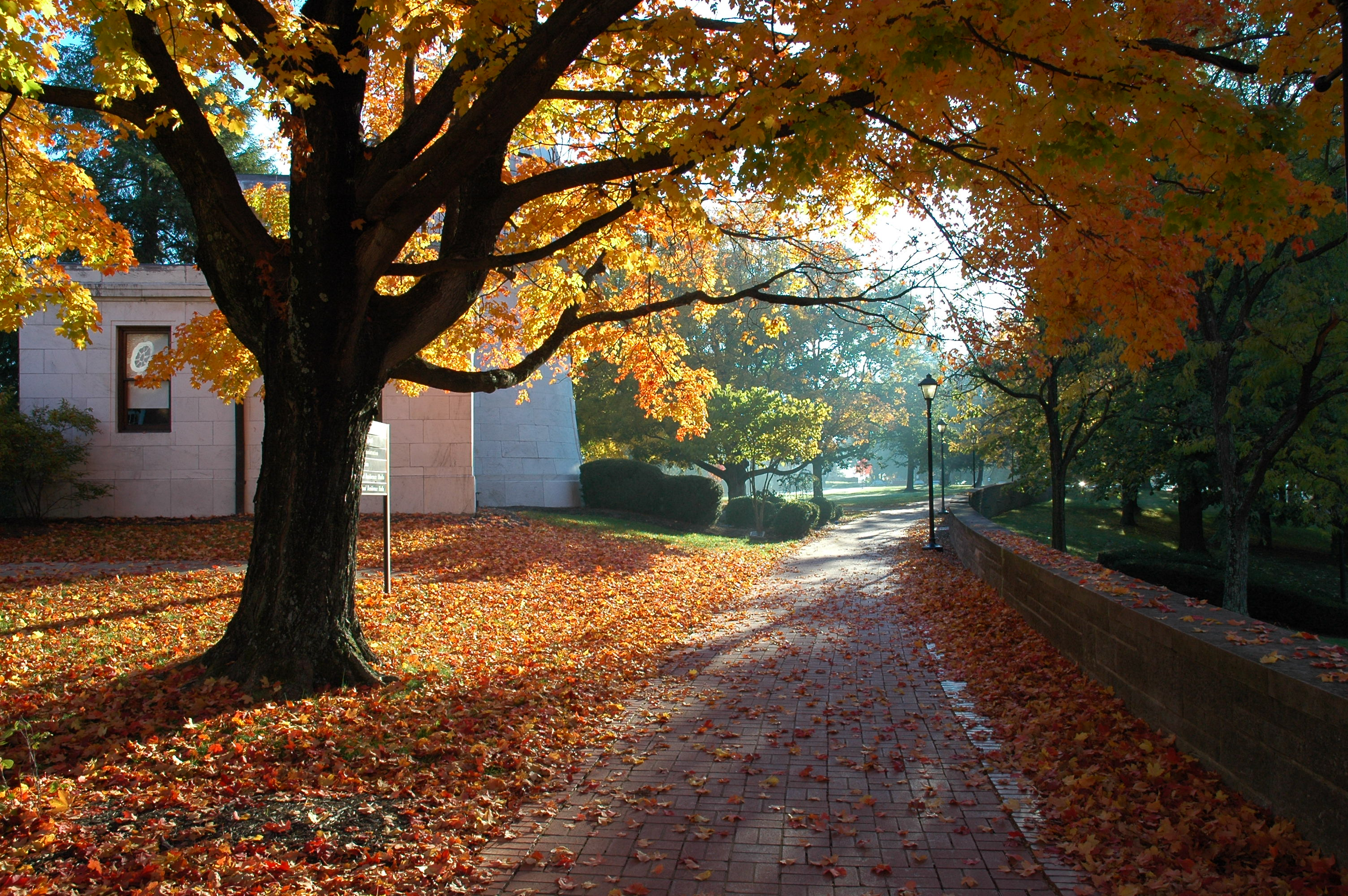
Chapel Walk during the fall season

Denison University is home to over 160 campus organizations with more than 600 students in leadership positions.

The Denison Campus Governance Association (DCGA) is the Denison student governing body, in which all students are encouraged to be involved in. The DCGA Student Senate is the primary representative body of students on Denison's campus, and it has been involved in various student initiatives: from postponing quiet hours in the fall of 2007 to drafting the Code of Academic Integrity adopted in the fall of 2009 to encouraging the University President to sign onto the Presidents' Climate Commitment.

Denison Community Association (DCA) is student-led and operated umbrella organization for student service committees. In 2015, 86% of students participated in community service.

Founded in 1857, The Denisonian is the student-run newspaper and oldest student organization on campus and prints ten issues per semester as well as online at denisonian.com.

The Bullsheet is a student-run publication for news, humor and community dialog that is printed daily and delivered to campus buildings. It was founded in 1979 to combat student apathy, and it remains central to campus culture by providing an open forum for free speech.

The Homestead is a student-run intentional community with a focus on ecological sustainability, founded in 1977. In 2025, the administration announced its plans to close the Homestead, after assuring students that it would not be closing the Homestead.

=== Fraternity and sorority life ===
There are 19 nationally recognized fraternal organization on campus, governed by four councils. As of 2023, 35% of students join a fraternity or sorority.

=== Traditions and folklore ===
D-Day, the successor to the college's old Scrap Day, is a celebration of the entire college, put on once a year by the University Programming Council (UPC).

Kirtley Mather, Class of 1909, named the tallest peak in Alaska's Aleutian Peninsula "Mt. Denison." In 1978 and 1998, groups of students, professors, and alumni scaled the mountain.

== Arts ==
Students can major or minor in theatre, music, visual art, studio art, art history, dance, or cinema. Denison also hosts a variety of annual festivals and series including The Vail Series, The Beck Series, The Bluegrass Festival, and Doobie Palooza.

The Vail Series began in 1979 as the result of a financial gift from Mary and Foster McGaw in honor of Jeanne Vail, class of 1946. Michael Morris, who previously worked as the executive director of the Midland Theatre, Newark, Ohio, was appointed to be the director of the program in 2014. According to an article by the Newark Advocate, The Vail Series is an "acclaimed visiting artist program" where artists are encouraged to both perform and interact with students. Tickets to the Vail Series are free to students. Former performers include Yo-Yo Ma, Itzhak Perlman, Renée Fleming, Wynton Marsalis, Jessye Norman, and Chris Thile and Edgar Meyer among others. In 2014, the university announced that ETHEL will become their first ensemble-in-residence. They performed their multimedia concert "Documerica" on campus during the spring of 2016 and received honorary degrees from the college at the commencement ceremony in 2017.

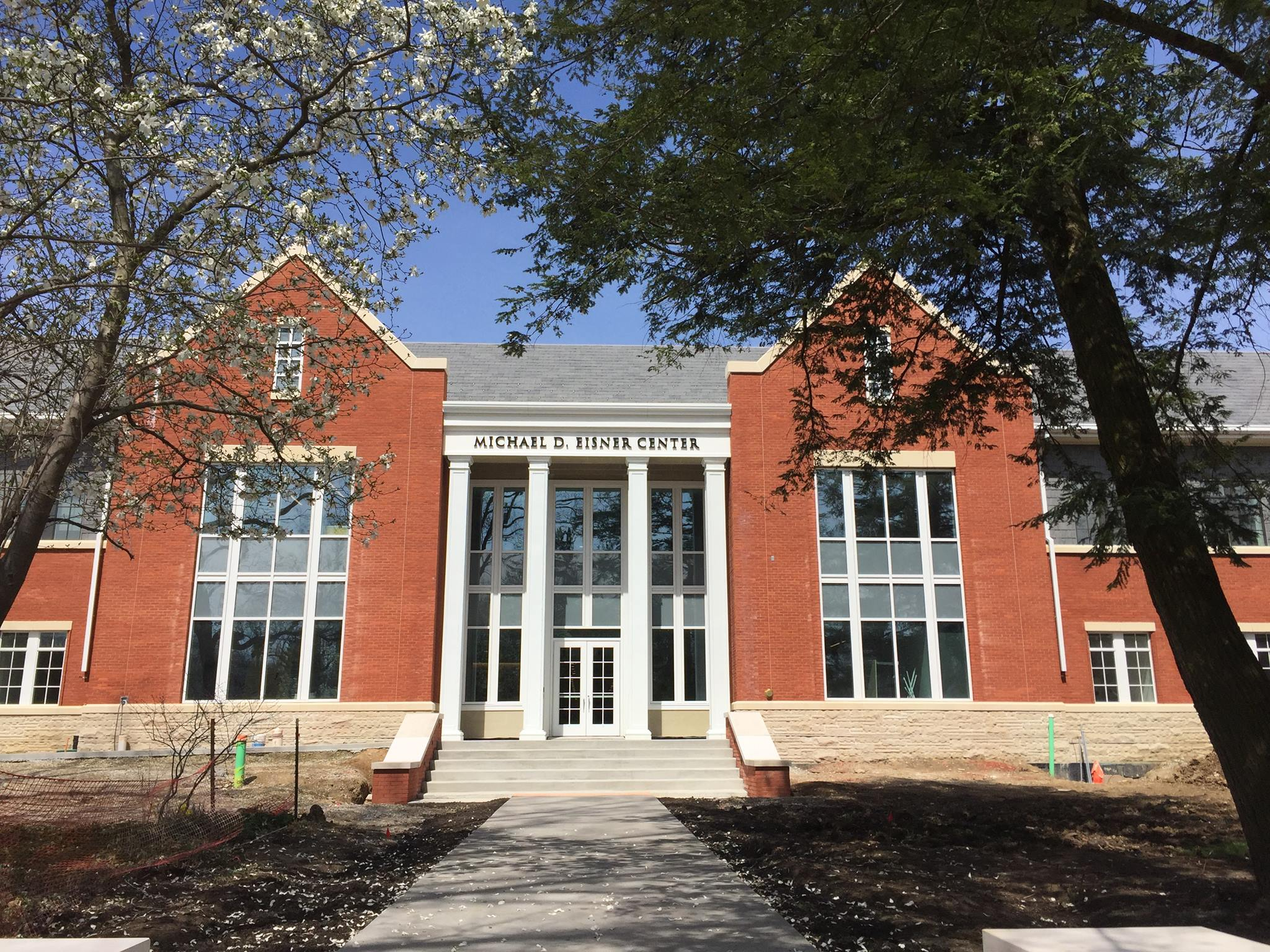
Michael D. Eisner Center for the Performing Arts

The Beck Series is associated with the creative writing program at Denison, and it brings a variety of authors to campus to read their work and interact with students. Former visitors include Pulitzer Prize winner Eudora Welty, National Book Award winner Alice Walker, Playwright and Oscar-winning screenwriter Tom Stoppard, Orange is the New Black author, Piper Kerman, and W. S. Merwin among others.

The college hosts an annual free Bluegrass Festival. This weekend-long celebration includes multiple concerts, instrument workshops, and jam sessions.

The campus radio station, WDUB a.k.a. The Doobie, features 24-hour programming and broadcasts both online at www.doobieradio.com. The station was featured in American Eagle stores across the country through the summer of 2009. The Doobie was also ranked by The Princeton Review as one of the best college radio stations in the nation.

Construction began in 2017 on the Michael D. Eisner Center for the Performing Arts, named for former CEO of The Walt Disney Company, Michael Eisner, who graduated from Denison in 1964. The building houses the departments of music, dance, and theatre, as well as multi-disciplinary performance and rehearsal spaces.

== Athletics ==
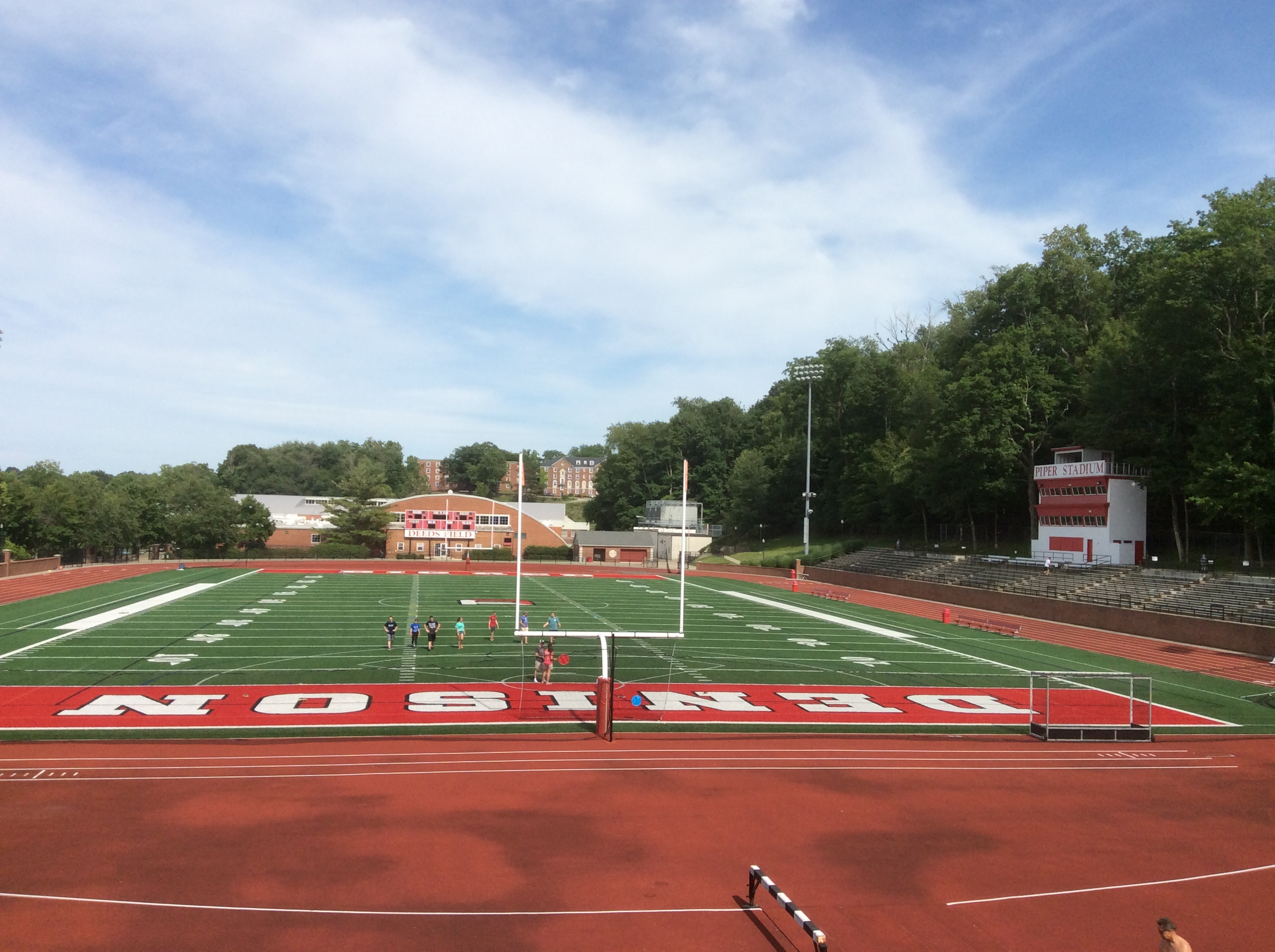
Deeds Field-Piper Stadium

Denison is a member of the NCAA Division III and the North Coast Athletic Conference (NCAC) since the conference's formation in 1984. As a part of the 10-member conference Denison boasts a league-record 11 Dennis M. Collins Awards which is given to the NCAC school that performs best across the conference's 23 sponsored sports: 11 for men and 12 for women. Denison additionally has 45 club and intramural sports. Denison won nine consecutive All-Sports Awards between 1997–1998 and 2005–2006. Denison's remaining two awards were earned in 1985–86 and 2008–2009.

In 2001, the Denison Women's Swimming and Diving team captured the school's first NCAA Division III national championship by breaking Kenyon College’s streak of 17-consecutive national championships. Following this, the Denison Men's Swimming and Diving team defeated Kenyon to capture the 2011 NCAA National Title by 1 point ending the Lords' 31-year streak of championships. Denison men won the national title in 2015–2016 and in 2017–2018.

In both men's and women's swimming and diving, Denison has posted 47 consecutive top-10 finishes at the NCAA Division III championships. During that span, Denison has placed either second or third, nationally, 26 times.

Denison alumnus Woody Hayes (Class of ’35) spent three seasons as the head football coach at Denison (1946–48). In 1947 and 1948 he guided the Big Red to undefeated seasons. Hayes went on to achieve legendary status as the head football coach at Ohio State.

In 1954, Keith Piper took over as the head football coach, a position he would remain in for 39 seasons. Piper won a school record, 200 games and in 1985 he guided the program to their first 10–0 season with his antique single-wing offense. Denison qualified for the NCAA Division III playoffs that season before falling to Mt. Union in the opening round.

Women's basketball at Denison has emerged as a national contender under head coach Sara Lee. Denison's 2010–11 squad completed the first 28–0 regular season in women's basketball in the NCAC and have advanced to the NCAA Division III Tournament for the seventh time in school history and their sixth time out of the last seven seasons.

The Denison men's and women's lacrosse programs have had their share of conference and national success. The two programs have combined for 28 NCAA Division III tournament berths. In 1999 and 2001 the Denison men's lacrosse team advanced to the semifinal (Final 4) of the NCAA Division III Tournament [10] and most recently, in 2009, the Big Red advanced to the national quarterfinals of the NCAC Tournament before falling to Gettysburg.

In 2008, the Denison women's tennis team advanced to the NCAA semifinals, eventually winning the consolation match to place third overall, marking the program's best national finish. That same year the doubles team of sophomore Marta Drane and freshman Kristen Cobb advanced to the championship match of the Division III Doubles championship before falling to Brittany Berckes and Alicia Menezes of Amherst in the finals.

The Denison women's soccer team advanced to the NCAA quarterfinals for the second time in school history in 2010. The previous appearance occurred in 2005. Overall the program has qualified for the NCAA Tournament 14 times.

In 2019, Denison was one of the first NCAA universities to participate in the organization's LGBTQ OneTeam Program, which launched in fall 2019.

Denison boasts 49 NCAA postgraduate scholars and 87 Academic All-Americans.

== Career center ==
In the spring of 2016, Denison University announced that the Austin E. Knowlton Foundation pledged $9.3 million towards the Center for Career Exploration, now known as The Austin E. Knowlton Center for Career Exploration. In 2017, the Knowlton Center was honored by the National Association of Colleges and Employers (NACE) when President Adam Weinberg was given the Career Services Champion Award.

The Knowlton Center provides programs beginning in a student's first year to prepare them for life after college including job and graduate school search assistance, career exploration, alumni mentoring, "first look" trips, and internship assistance. The center also provides internship funding to students on an application basis, ranging from $100-$4,000 to offset costs incurred during an internship.

Denison University is one of the eight members of the CLIMB internship program, an internship program in Denver that partners with Denison, Harvard, Middlebury, M.I.T., Northwestern, Stanford, Wesleyan, and Yale.

== Notable faculty and alumni ==
Denison alumni include scholars (such as the former president of Princeton University William G. Bowen), Hollywood actors and actresses, entrepreneurs, presidents and executives of Fortune 500 companies.

Among the faculty, its current economics professor Sohrab Behdad founded the Economics Department of the University of Tehran, and the former professor William Rainey Harper served as the first president of The University of Chicago.

=== Alumni ===
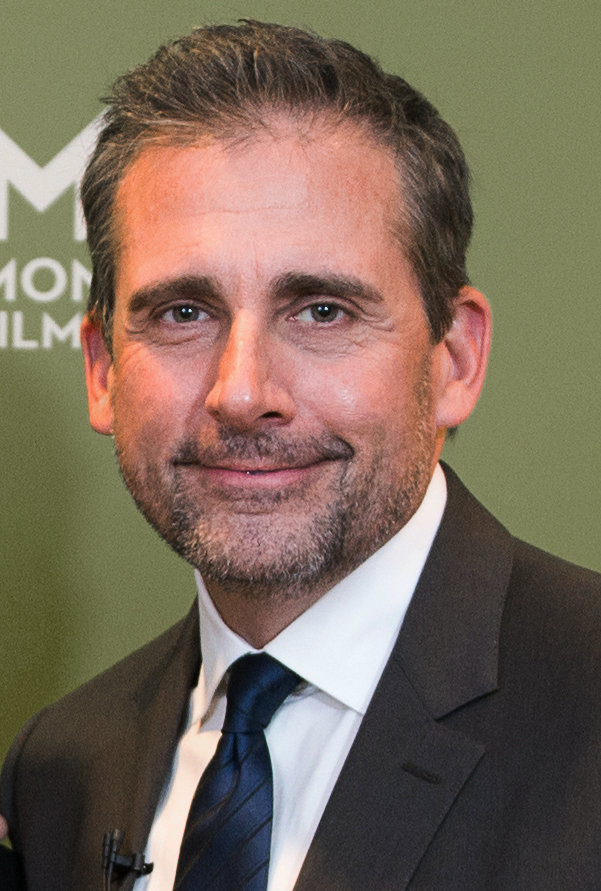
Steve Carell, comedian, actor

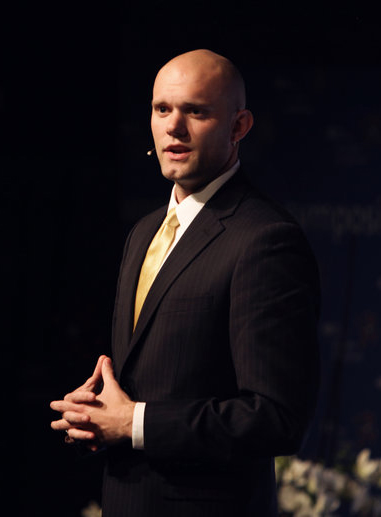
James Clear, best-selling author

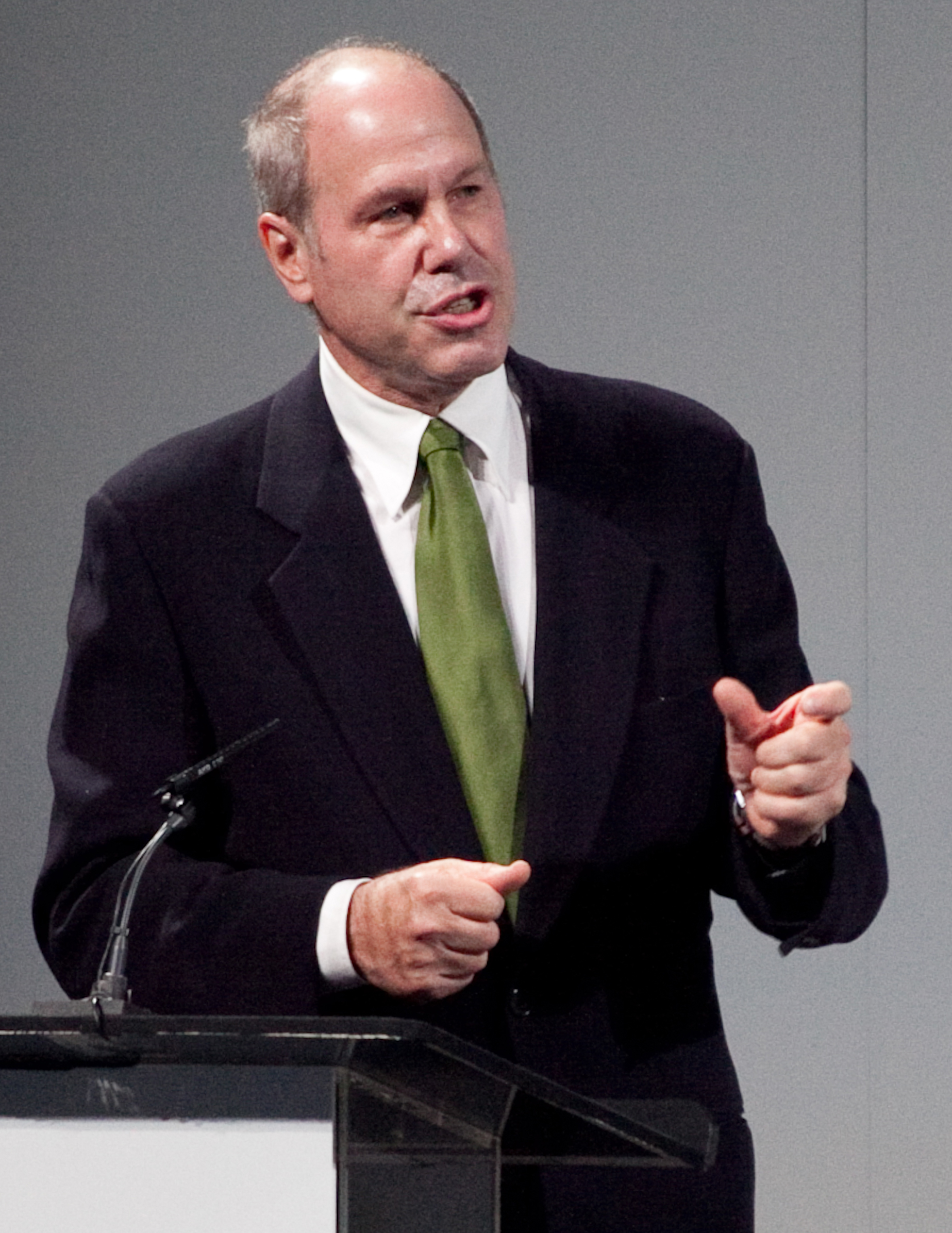
Michael Eisner, chairman and chief executive officer of The Walt Disney Company

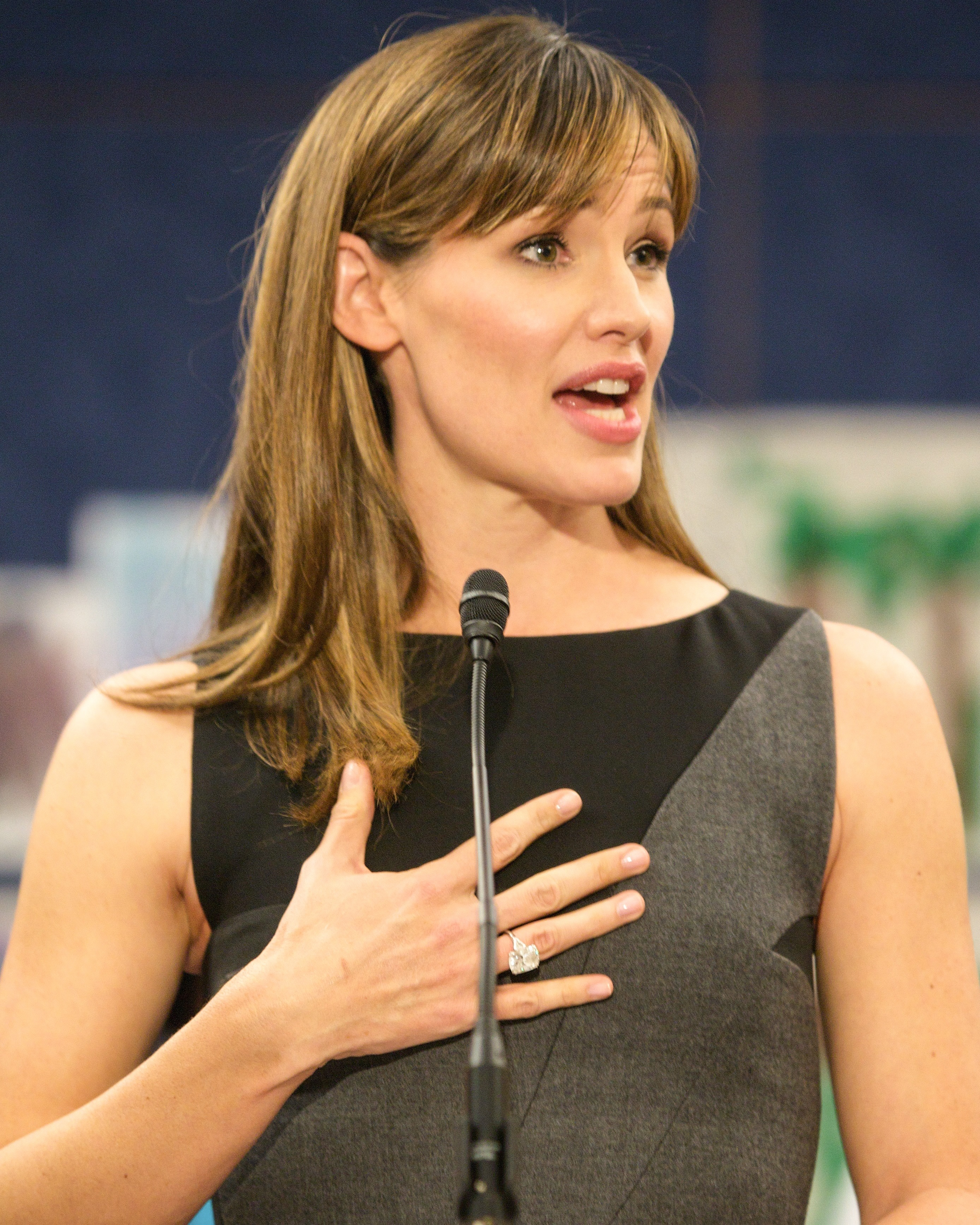
Jennifer Garner, actress

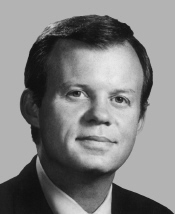
Tony P. Hall, Nobel Peace Prize nominee, U.S. Ambassador to the United Nations, and U.S. Representative

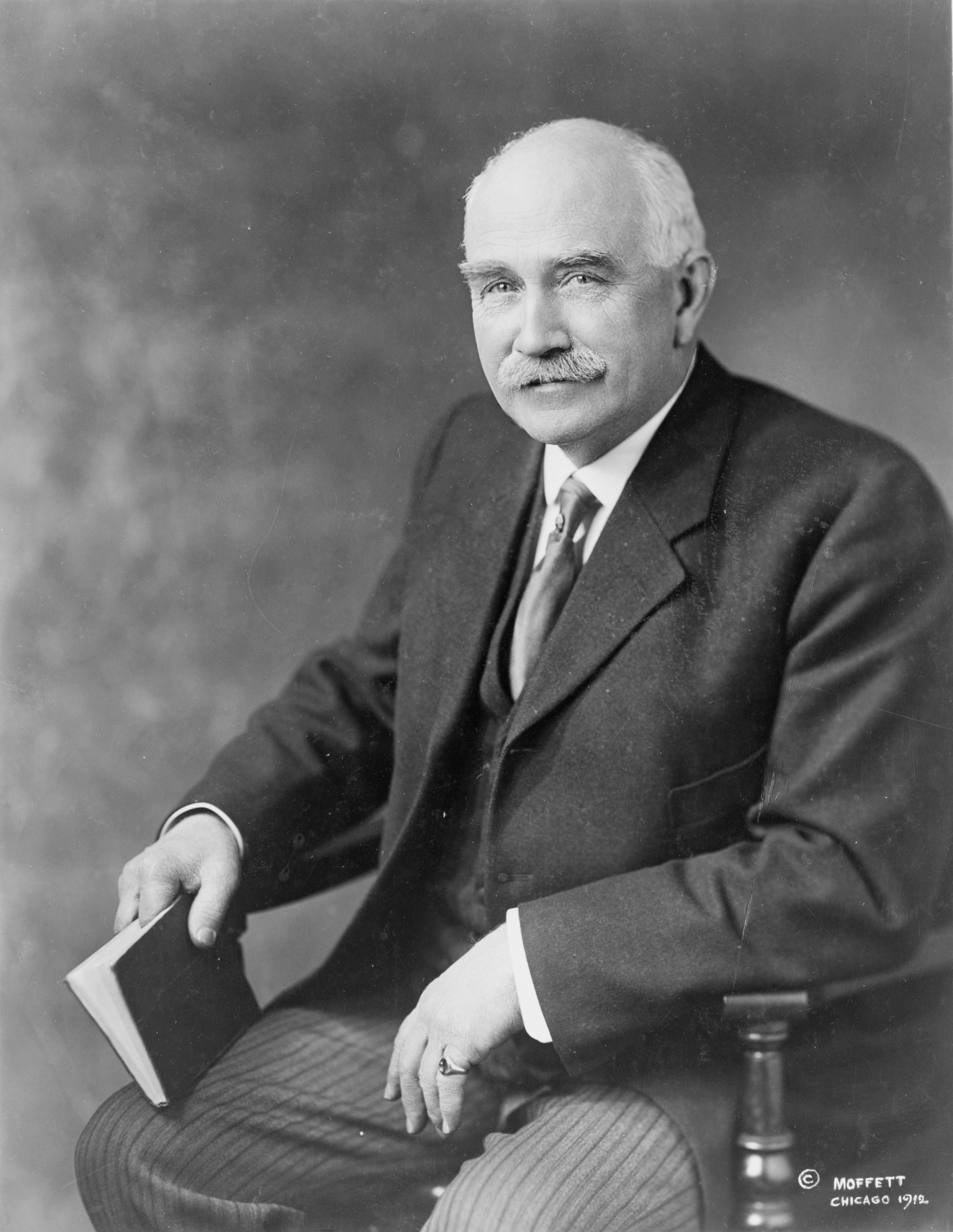
Judson Harmon, 41st United States Attorney General and 45th Governor of Ohio

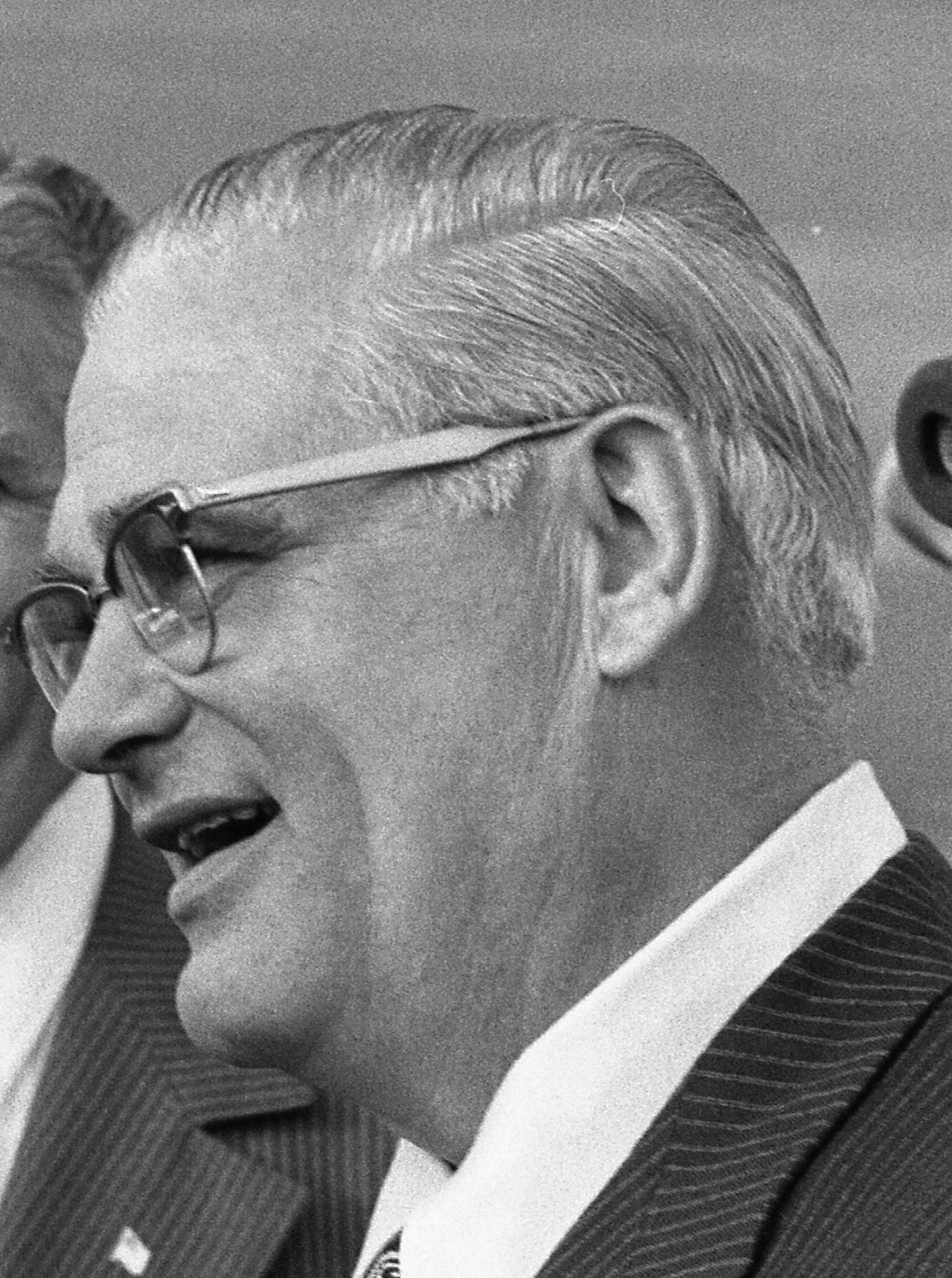
Woody Hayes, Hall of Fame football coach

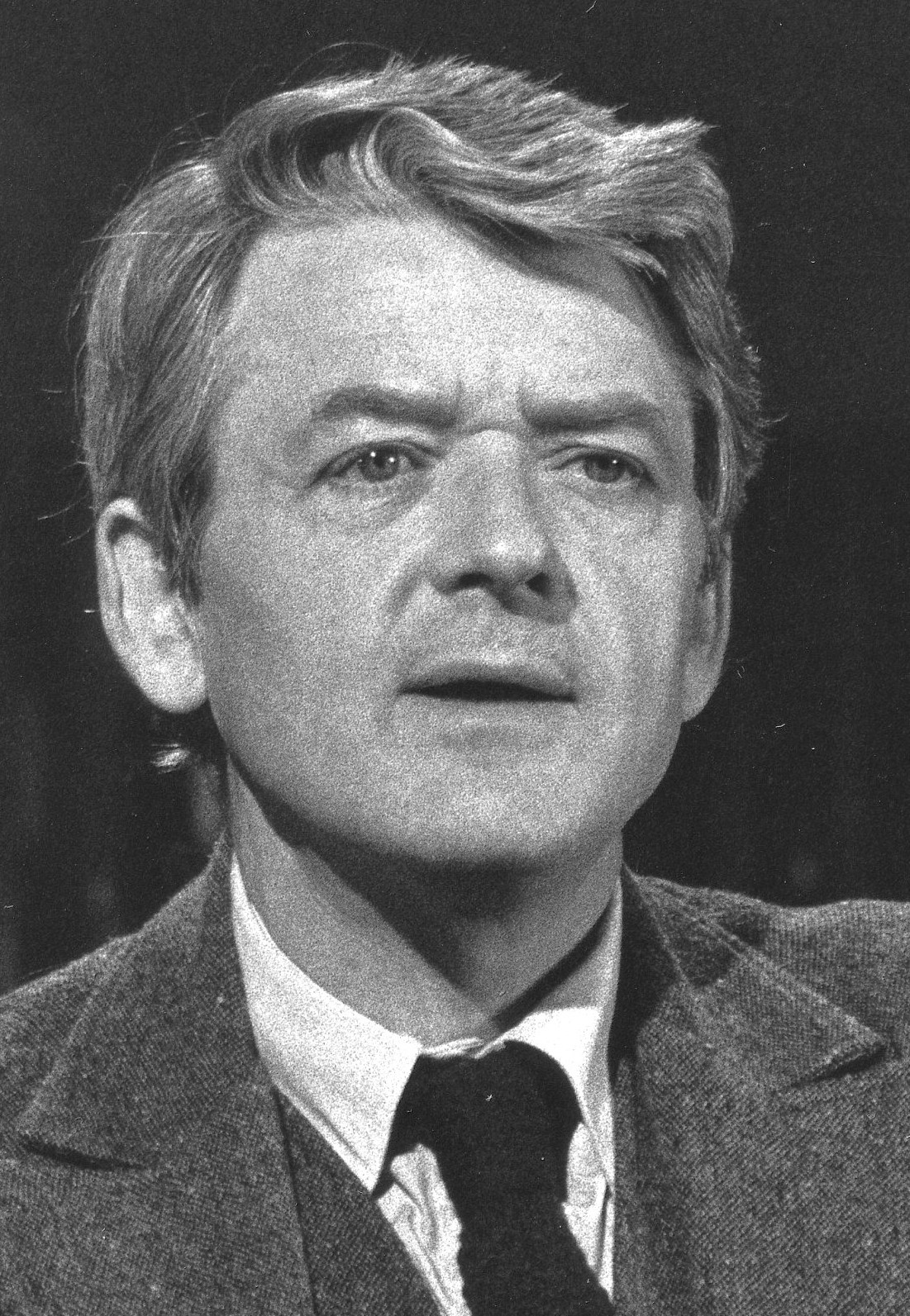
Hal Holbrook, actor

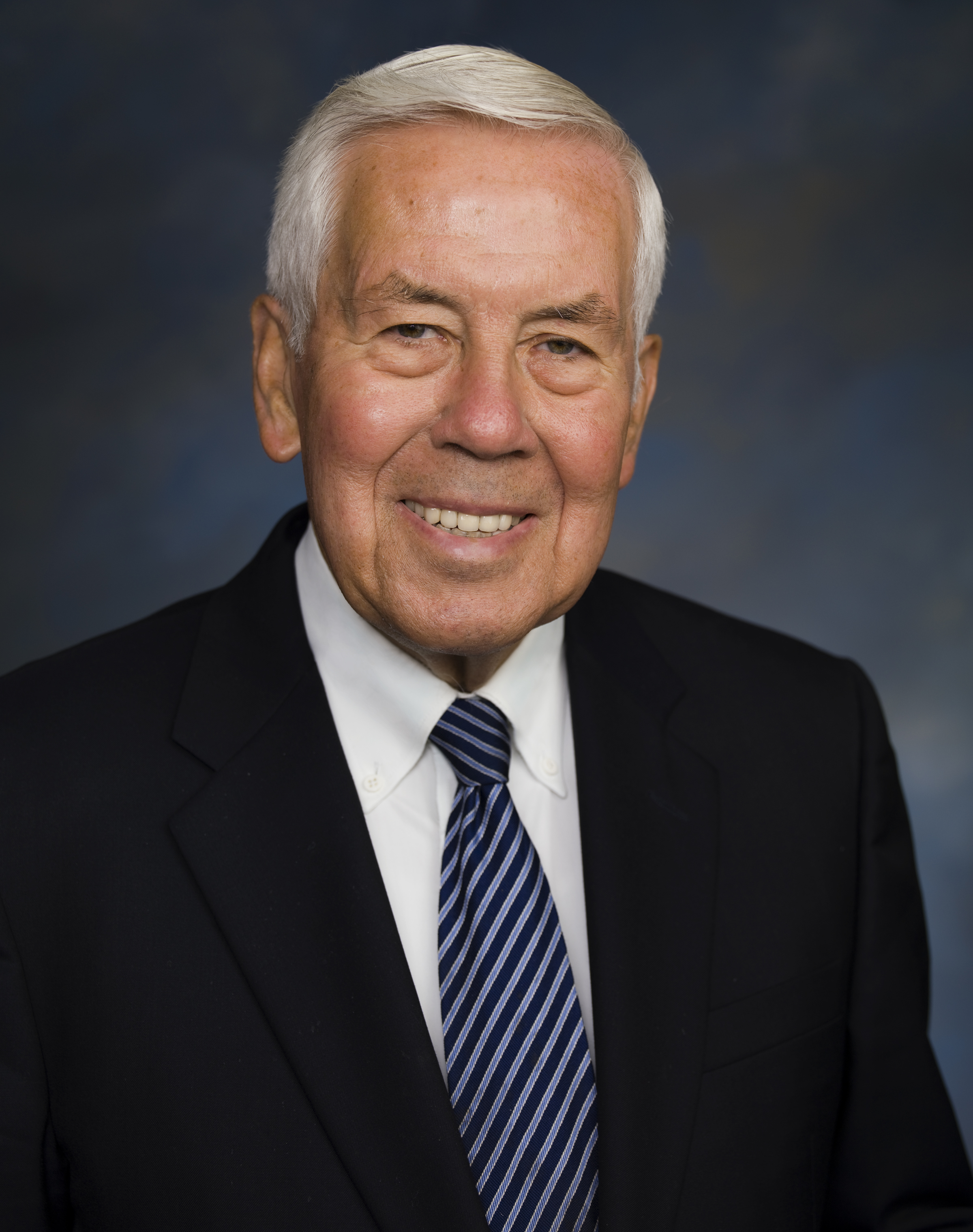
Richard Lugar, United States Senator from Indiana

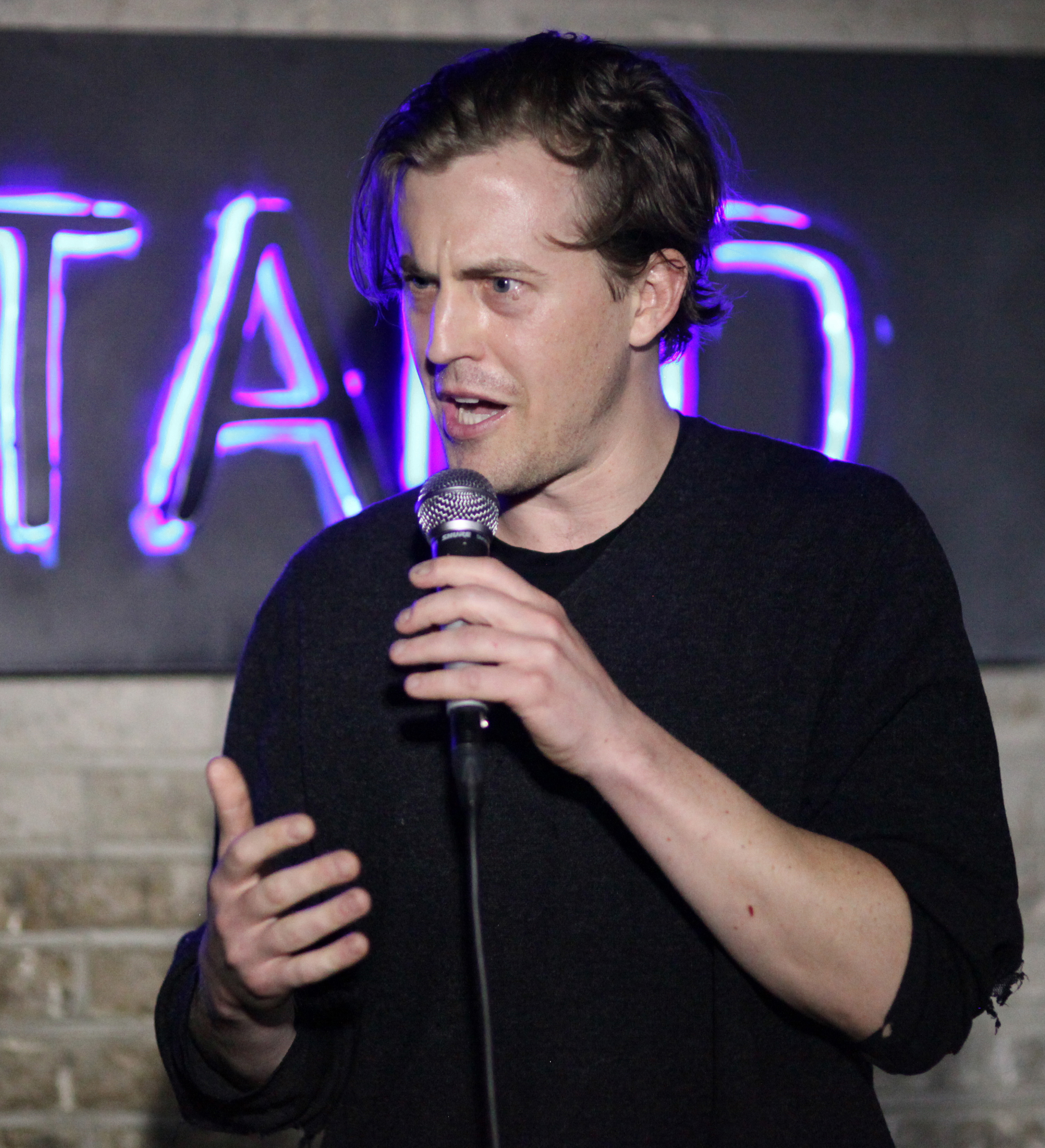
Alex Moffat, actor, comedian, and former cast member on Saturday Night Live.

Notable alumni include actors Steve Carell, Hal Holbrook, and Jennifer Garner; SNL comedian Alex Moffat; entertainer John Davidson; Hall of Fame college football coach Woody Hayes; ESPN president George Bodenheimer; Turner Broadcasting System Senior Vice President James Anderson; drag queen and LGBT activist Nina West, former member of Turkish Parliament and current consultant to The Coca-Cola Company Mehmet Cem Kozluformer; United States Senator Richard Lugar; Indy car racer Bobby Rahal; playwright Jeffrey Hatcher; artist Ned Bittinger; author Pam Houston, controversial author James Frey; former Disney Chairman and CEO Michael Eisner; American criminologist and father of "evidence-based policing" Lawrence Sherman; former Ohio Attorney General Jim Petro; former Princeton University President William Bowen; folklorist, oral historian, author, and podcast host Douglas A. Boyd; professor of religion at Goucher College and theologian at the Washington National Cathedral Kelly Brown Douglas; Randolph Marshall Hollerith, Dean of the Washington National Cathedral; and George Stibitz, one of the fathers of modern digital computing. Laura Carter did not live to graduate, as she was killed by a stray bullet while in Columbus, Ohio near the end of her freshman year, which was depicted in the Christopher Cross song Think of Laura.

=== Faculty ===
- Robert Alrutz (1921-1997)
- David Baker (1984–)
- Paul Alfred Biefeld (1911–1943)
- Theodore Burczak (1995–)
- Andy Carlson (1999–2018)
- Asa Drury (1834–1836)
- Peter Grandbois (2010–)
- William Rainey Harper (1876–1878)
- Anthony J. Lisska (1969–2022)
- Kirtley Fletcher Mather (1918–1924)
- Margot Singer (2005–)

== See also ==
- "Think of Laura" - Christopher Cross song about the death of Denison University college student Laura Carter
- The Homestead at Denison University
