= William S. Denison =

William S. Denison (1794–1880) was a Baptist farmer who was a major benefactor and namesake of Denison University in Ohio.

William S. Denison was born in Colrain, Massachusetts on November 13, 1794 as the youngest of eight children. His family was originally from Stonington, Connecticut. Denison migrated to Ohio in 1810 settling in Putnam in Muskingum County, Ohio and then moving to Zanesville, Ohio. Denison attended Ohio University studying scientific farming methods. Denison eventually acquired nearly 1,500 acres of farmland. Denison was a longtime member of the Salem Baptist Church in Adamsville. In 1853, William S. Denison pledged $10,000 toward the Granville College, which was a Baptist school. Honoring an earlier commitment, the trustees accordingly changed the name of the institution to Denison University. They also voted to move the college to land then available for purchase in the village of Granville. Denison died in 1880.
