= Asa Drury =

American Baptist minister and abolitionist (1801–1870)

- Asa Drury ca. 1865
- Born: July 26, 1801; Athol, Massachusetts
- Died: March 18, 1870 (aged 68); St. Anthony, Minnesota, United States
- Education: Yale University A.B. 1829; Brown University A.M. 1832; Brown University D.D. 1834
- Known for: establishment of public schools in Covington, Kentucky; antebellum abolitionist; Denison University professor
- Spouses: Hannah Perry Drury (m. 1832) Mary Elizabeth (Willard) Drury (m. 1834)
- Children: Alexander Greer Drury (1844–1929); Marshall P. Drury (b. 1846)

Notes
- Asa Drury biography at Kenton County Library

Asa Drury (1801–1870) was an American Baptist minister and educator primarily teaching at Granville Literary and Theological Institution (today's Denison University) in Granville, Ohio, and the Western Baptist Theological Institute in Covington, Kentucky, and establishing the public schools in Covington. He is best known for his antebellum abolitionist views and his role in establishing the Underground Railroad in Ohio.

== Early life, education, and family ==
Asa Drury was born July 26, 1801, in Athol, Massachusetts, as the fifth of eleven children of Joel Drury and Ruth (Hill) Drury. Drury studied at Yale University, earning his A.B. degree in 1829. Upon graduation, he served as rector of the Hopkins Grammar School in New Haven, Connecticut, from 1829 to 1831. He earned his A.M. degree at Brown University in 1832, followed by his D.D. from the same institution in 1834. He was ordained as a Baptist minister in Providence, Rhode Island, on September 14, 1834. Drury married Hannah Perry of Brookfield, Massachusetts, on January 17, 1832, but she died within a year. While studying at Brown University, he met and married Mary Elizabeth Willard. On September 7, 1834, the First Baptist Church of Providence voted to ordain Asa and to dismiss him and "Sister Mary E. Drury" to the Granville Baptist Church. He and Elizabeth had two sons. Alexander G. Drury (b. 1844) and Marshall P. Drury (b. 1846).

== Academic and ministerial career ==
Shortly after ordination in 1834, Drury was recruited by fellow Brown University alumnus and President of Granville Literary and Theological Institution, John Pratt, to teach Latin and Greek. Drury taught there for two years, but he was best known for his abolitionist activism and establishing a station of the Underground Railroad on the Granville campus and working to organize the 1836 Ohio Abolitionist Convention to be held in Granville. In 1836 possibly as fallout from the Granville Riot, Drury accepted a position as a professor of Greek at Cincinnati College where he remained until 1845, except for a year of teaching Latin and Greek at Waterville College in Waterville, Maine, during the 1839–1840 academic year.

Beginning in 1845, Drury accepted the first of a series of positions in Covington, Kentucky. Drury was among the first faculty members at the Western Baptist Theological Institute in Covington, where he taught theology. He was also responsible for the classical school attached to the seminary. Drury left the Western Baptist Theological Institute in 1853 to teach and serve as principal at the Covington Public High School that first opened its doors on January 8, 1853. On January 26, 1856, he was named the first Superintendent of the Covington Public School System. Drury's work as superintendent was exemplary, and he was given several raises by the board. These raises, however, violated the charter of the school system (his salary had increased beyond the legal limit imposed by the school charter). In 1859, the members of the board reduced his salary so it would be in compliance with the charter. Drury resigned on the spot. That same year, Drury and a partner opened the Judsonia Female Seminary in the old Western Baptist Theological Institute building (the institute having closed several years earlier in 1855). The Judsonia Seminary did not survive beyond 1861 when the seminary building was used as a hospital during the American Civil War.

Beginning with his commissioning as an officer on February 8, 1862, Drury served as chaplain for the 18th Regiment Kentucky Volunteer Infantry in the Union Army during the Civil War. He was captured at the Battle of Richmond in Kentucky on August 30, 1862, and sent home on parole, officially mustering out of the service on October 4, 1863. In 1864 he moved to Minnesota and taught private school for a year. In 1865, he accepted a position as the pastor of the First Baptist Church in St. Anthony, Minnesota. He died there on March 18, 1870. Drury was buried at Linden Grove Cemetery in Covington, Kentucky, on March 26, 1870.

== Genealogy and family relations ==
Asa Drury's son Alexander Greer Drury (February 3, 1844 – January 17, 1929) was a noted physician and medical historian with a practice in Cincinnati and a teaching appointment in dermatology at the Laura Memorial Woman's Medical College in Cincinnati (1890–1900), followed by a faculty appointment in hygiene at the Cincinnati College of Medicine (1901–1910). He was the author of Legends of the Apple (1904), and Dante, Physician (1908), and he served as president of the Ohio State Medical Association. Drury's second son, Marshall, was an insurance broker in St. Louis, Missouri. Asa Drury was a direct descendant of Hugh Drury and Lydia (Rice) Drury, the daughter of Edmund Rice, an English immigrant to Massachusetts Bay Colony, as follows:

- Asa Drury, son of
  - Joel Drury (1768 – ?), son of
  - John Drury (1742–1831), son of
    - John Drury (ca 1692 – 1754), son of
    - Thomas Drury (1668–1723), son of
    - John Drury (1646–1678), son of
    - Hugh Drury (1616–1689) and Lydia (Rice) Drury (1627–1675), daughter of
      - Edmund Rice (1594–1663)
