= Cranberry Bog (Ohio) =

Wetland in the state of Ohio, United States

- Location within Ohio Location within the United States
- Location: Licking County, Ohio
- Coordinates: 39.9315°N 82.4682°W
- Basin countries: United States
- Surface area: 21 acres (0.085 km^{2})

U.S. National Natural Landmark
- Designated: 1968

Cranberry Bog is a body of water in Licking County, Ohio, United States. It is a wetland with relict postglacial biodiversity, including sphagnum moss and the American cranberry. Forming the heart of Cranberry Bog State Nature Preserve, the state-owned body of water was listed as a National Natural Landmark in 1968.

== Description ==
The National Park Service describes Cranberry Bog as follows:

The only known bog of its type in existence, Cranberry Bog is a “floating island” in Buckeye Lake.
