= The Homestead at Denison University =

Intentional community in Ohio, US

Coordinates: 40°04′54.7″N 82°31′15.9″W

The Homestead at Denison University is a student-run intentional community at Denison University in Granville, Ohio. It was founded in 1977 by a group of students and the biology professor Robert Alrutz, and describes itself as "an ever-evolving experiment in community." It houses a maximum of twelve students per semester.

In 2025, the Denison administration announced that the Homestead would stop housing students after the spring 2027 semester, the year of its fiftieth anniversary. The announcement sparked backlash and protests from students, alumni and faculty.

== History ==
The Homestead began in 1977 as an experiment by a group of students and Alrutz, who aimed to create an agriculturally based, self-reliant, democratic community. It grew out of a period when Denison students sought more practical, experience-based learning, which had earlier produced the university's Experimental College.

The Homestead was built on a 10-acre parcel of Denison land across a valley to the north of the main campus, in a clearing in the woods about one mile from campus. Students built three wooden cabins, the first in 1977; they had no running water and were heated by wood stoves. Alrutz and alumnus Richard Downs worked alongside the students on construction. The cabins were originally expected to stand for three to five years before being replaced.

Alrutz served as the Homestead's faculty advisor from 1977 to 1990, when he retired from Denison. He died on October 14, 1997. As his involvement declined, ties between the Homestead and the university's faculty and staff weakened, and by 1996 only five students lived there.

In 1996 the Homestead Advisory Board (HAB) was re-established. Under the Homestead's constitution, the board includes residents, faculty, and staff, with at least two Homesteaders and the Homestead Coordinator. It reviews major physical changes to the property, large purchases, the program's curriculum, and its finances. The same year's Homestead seminar drew up plans for a straw-bale community building, named Cabin Bob in honor of Alrutz. Completed in 2001, it serves as the kitchen and common study area.

In the winter of 2000, Cabin 2 was destroyed by a fire caused by mishandled wood-stove ashes; no one was injured, but a dog and several cats died.

The position of Homestead Coordinator, a Denison staff role, was created in 2002. The same year, Denison's Academic Affairs Committee accepted the Homestead Seminar as a credit-bearing course. Residents earn academic credit for the seminar, in which faculty and guests lead weekly discussions.

An earthship named Cabin Phoenix, built with rammed-earth tires and straw-bale insulation on the site of the burned cabin, was completed in 2009.

In May 2012, more than 200 current and former residents gathered for the Homestead's 35th anniversary. Ahead of the reunion, students worked with humanities librarian Josh Finnell to digitize the Homestead's photographs and documents, and current residents recorded oral histories during the weekend. The project was funded by an Andrew W. Mellon Foundation Next Generation Libraries grant. The resulting archive is part of Denison's library digital collections.

In spring 2013, construction began on Cabin Atlas, which replaced the original Cabin 3 and became the largest building on the site; its completion was celebrated that October. The Homestead had operated completely off the grid until 2013.

=== 2024–present ===
In 2024, students living at the Homestead learned on their return that over the summer that their cats had been rehomed and their chickens had died, apparently killed by a predator. Students said they had not been consulted, and rumors spread that the Homestead would close; the chair of the advisory board said there were no plans other than to carry on as usual.

In November 2025, The Denisonian reported that the administration had decided to end the Homestead as a residence in 2027, citing low engagement and institutional changes. The Homestead had not had a full complement of twelve residents since 2020. The university later cited declining student participation, the long-term investment needed to sustain the program and its facilities, and health and safety concerns. The decision has been compared to Kenyon College's 2022 elimination of the residential program at its farm; in April 2026, more than 30 Kenyon students visited a Homestead community dinner in solidarity.

Interest in the Homestead grew after word spread of the imminent closure, with attendance at weekly community dinners reaching as many as 150 people; in fall 2026, the Homestead had its maximum of twelve residents. On October 22, 2026, students, faculty, and alumni held a "Save the Stead" demonstration on campus and marched to a meeting of the board of trustees; the university said it would not reverse the decision.

== Amenities and lifestyle ==
Residents live in two cabins and share a third communal building, Cabin Bob, which houses a kitchen with a wood-burning stove, a library, and study space. Solar panels provide electricity, a wood-burning boiler provides heat, water comes from a well, and the toilets are composting. The site also uses rooftop solar arrays and passive solar design.

Residents keep chickens for eggs and tend vegetable gardens and a greenhouse, supplementing their food with community-supported agriculture and grocery trips; meals are vegetarian and often vegan. Chores include chopping wood, keeping the wood furnace and stove going, feeding the chickens, cooking, and maintaining the composting toilet. Residents meet weekly and hold Saturday morning work parties, make decisions by consensus at their nightly dinners, and host a community dinner open to the campus every Friday.
