= Socialism After Hayek =

2006 book

- Author: Theodore A. Burczak
- Language: English
- Series: Advances in Heterodox Economics
- Publisher: University of Michigan Press
- Publication date: 2006
- Publication place: United States
- Pages: 184
- ISBN: 978-0-472-09951-1

Socialism After Hayek is a 2006 book by American economics professor Theodore A. Burczak. It is part of the Advances in Heterodox Economics series and published by University of Michigan Press. The book was reviewed by Andrew Farrant and Virgil Henry Storr in The Review of Austrian Economics. Brent Kramer reviewed the book in the Review of Radical Political Economics. David Emanuel Andersson wrote a critical assessment of Hayek and Burczak in the Journal of Institutional Economics.

Burczak, Theodore A. (2006). Socialism after Hayek. University of Michigan Press. doi:10.3998/mpub.93585. ISBN 978-0-472-09951-1.
