= Cranberry Bog State Nature Preserve =

Nature preserve in Buckeye Lake, Ohio, U.S.

Coordinates: 39°55′56″N 82°28′01″W

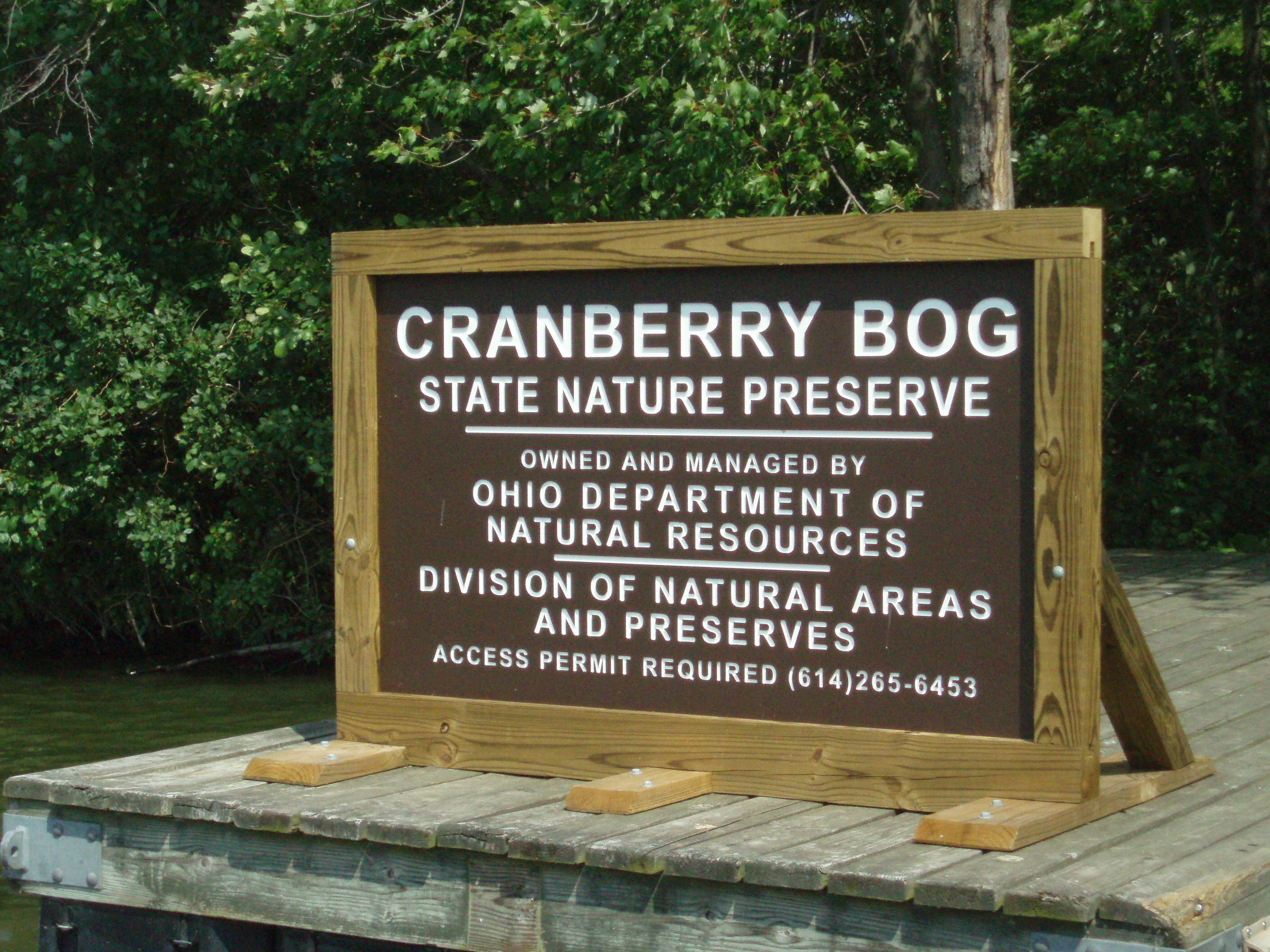
This sign greets visitors as they are about to enter the nature preserve.

Cranberry Bog State Nature Preserve, which is located in Buckeye Lake in Licking County, Ohio, is the only floating island bog in the world. Once known as the “Big Swamp,” it is significant to Ohio, evidenced by its designation as one of the state's first National Natural Landmarks in October 1968 and its classification as a State Nature Preserve in 1977. This nature preserve is one of the remnants left behind by Ohio's glacial activity, and as its name suggests, large quantities of cranberries can still be found on the bog today. This island is also home to various other plant and animal species, with its verge serving as a tourist attraction that can be visited by the public.

The heart of the Nature Preserve, the 21-acre Cranberry Bog itself, is listed as a National Natural Landmark but is usually not open to the public.

== Geography and geology ==
Buckeye Lake, where the bog is located, was once a river valley. However, near the end of the Pleistocene Ice Age about 18,000 years ago, the Wisconsonian Glacier retreated across the area, resulting in a 46-foot-deep glacial lake. Over the course of time, this lake filled with peat deposits, which turned it into a marsh and eventually a forested swamp. The swamp was home to a cranberry bog mat that was much different than the one that is there today.

In the 1900s, the state of Ohio flooded valleys to create a feeder for the Ohio Erie canal. The waterlogged sponge surrounding the cranberry bog created a new water level. Instead of the bog mat disappearing under the water, it grew to be a 50-acre island bog. The bog, contradictory to what its name suggests, isn't truly floating; it has many layers underneath like peat and dead sphagnum moss.

== History ==
Cranberry Bog State Nature Preserve has a rich history that reflects the transformation of the landscape over time. Originally referred to as the "Big Swamp" by early settlers, it served as an essential source for cranberry production when the bog was just a small mat in the middle of the swamp.

In 1826, the Ohio Canal Commission started making changes by creating an earthen dike, which allowed the reservoir to fill and effectively transformed the Big Swamp into the Licking County Reservoir. In 1894, the Ohio General Assembly designated this reservoir as a public park, naming it Buckeye Lake, which came under the management of the Ohio Department of Natural Resources (ODNR).

In 1973, Cranberry Island was officially designated as the Cranberry Bog State Nature Preserve. It continues to be overseen by the ODNR Division of Natural Areas and Preserves (DNAP). That year, public donations enabled a boardwalk to be built in the bog. Through 1999, the public could take a DNAP-led tour the bog in late June, when the cranberries were in peak bloom.

== Flora ==
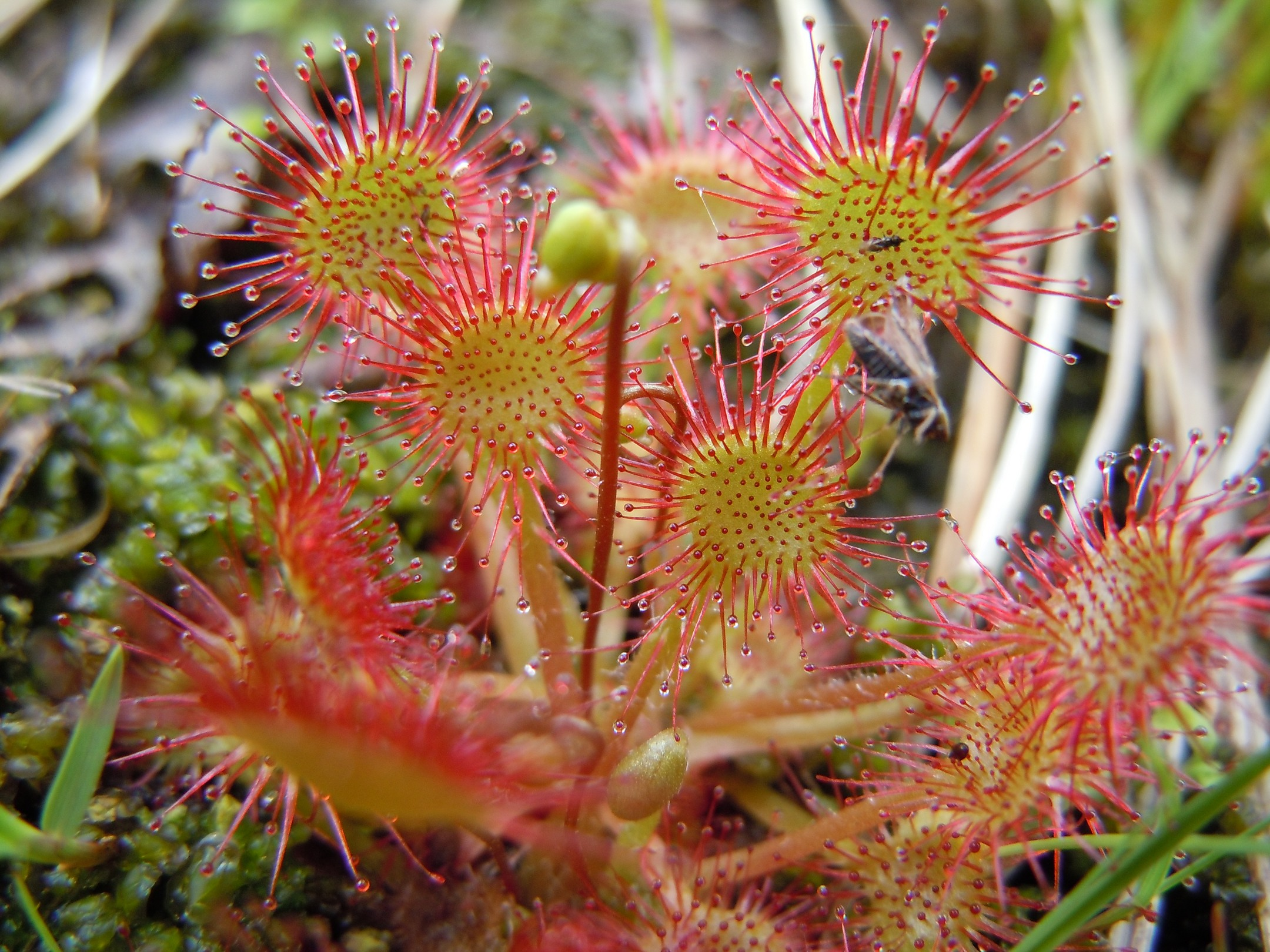
Round-leaved Sundew

Bogs, which are wetlands mostly made up of peat and decaying plant matter, are an ideal environment for cranberries. The bog conditions affect the plants in many different ways. There are nutrients in the peat that help the plants grow. In addition to cranberries, the bog's environment supports a variety of different plants, including rare flora. Some of the plants include round-leaved sundew, northern pitcher plants, rose pogonia, and orchids like pink calopogon. Both the round-leaved sundew and northern pitcher plants are carnivorous.

== Bog over time ==
The future of the cranberry bog remains uncertain, as it continues to shrink year after year. This decline is driven by two key factors: natural processes and human impact. The water is becoming more basic, which further accelerates the decomposition of the floating island. Human activities such as boating and visitation have also contributed to shrinking of the Cranberry Bog. Experts believe the bog is going to disappear eventually.

== Public visitation ==
When water levels are at a safe height for visitation, Cranberry Bog boat tours are available to the public. Additionally, Cranberry Bog Day occurs on the third Saturday every June.
