= List of former United States representatives (W) =

This is the complete list of former United States representatives whose last names begin with the letter W.

== Number of years and terms the member has served ==
The number of years the representative/delegate has served in Congress indicates the number of terms the representative/delegate has. Note the representative/delegate can also serve non-consecutive terms if the representative/delegate loses election and wins re-election to the House.

- 2 years - 1 or 2 terms
- 4 years - 2 or 3 terms
- 6 years - 3 or 4 terms
- 8 years - 4 or 5 terms
- 10 years - 5 or 6 terms
- 12 years - 6 or 7 terms
- 14 years - 7 or 8 terms
- 16 years - 8 or 9 terms
- 18 years - 9 or 10 terms
- 20 years - 10 or 11 terms
- 22 years - 11 or 12 terms
- 24 years - 12 or 13 terms
- 26 years - 13 or 14 terms
- 28 years - 14 or 15 terms
- 30 years - 15 or 16 terms
- 32 years - 16 or 17 terms
- 34 years - 17 or 18 terms
- 36 years - 18 or 19 terms
- 38 years - 19 or 20 terms
- 40 years - 20 or 21 terms
- 42 years - 21 or 22 terms
- 44 years - 22 or 23 terms
- 46 years - 23 or 24 terms
- 48 years - 24 or 25 terms
- 50 years - 25 or 26 terms
- 52 years - 26 or 27 terms
- 54 years - 27 or 28 terms
- 56 years - 28 or 29 terms
- 58 years - 29 or 30 terms

Name	Term	State/ Territory	Party	Lifespan
Frank C. Wachter	1899–1907	Maryland	Republican	1861–1910
Alfred Moore Waddell	1871–1879	North Carolina	Democratic	1834–1912
Edmund Waddill Jr.	1890–1891	Virginia	Republican	1855–1931
James R. Waddill	1879–1881	Missouri	Democratic	1842–1917
Edward Wade	1853–1855	Ohio	Free Soiler	1802–1866
Edward Wade	1855–1861	Ohio	Republican	1802–1866
Martin J. Wade	1903–1905	Iowa	Democratic	1861–1931
William H. Wade	1885–1891	Missouri	Republican	1835–1911
James W. Wadsworth Jr.	1933–1951	New York	Republican	1877–1952
James W. Wadsworth	1881–1885; 1891–1907	New York	Republican	1846–1926
Jeremiah Wadsworth	1789–1795	Connecticut	Pro-Administration	1743–1804
Peleg Wadsworth	1793–1795	Massachusetts	Pro-Administration	1748–1829
Peleg Wadsworth	1795–1807	Massachusetts	Federalist	1748–1829
William H. Wadsworth	1861–1865	Kentucky	Unionist	1821–1893
William H. Wadsworth	1885–1887	Kentucky	Republican	1821–1893
David D. Wagener	1833–1841	Pennsylvania	Democratic	1792–1860
Joe Waggonner	1961–1979	Louisiana	Democratic	1918–2007
Earl T. Wagner	1949–1951	Ohio	Democratic	1908–1990
Peter Joseph Wagner	1839–1841	New York	Whig	1795–1884
George C. R. Wagoner	1903	Missouri	Republican	1863–1946
J. Mayhew Wainwright	1923–1931	New York	Republican	1864–1945
Stuyvesant Wainwright	1953–1961	New York	Republican	1921–2010
John T. Wait	1876–1887	Connecticut	Republican	1811–1899
James Wakefield	1883–1887	Minnesota	Republican	1825–1910
Abram Wakeman	1855–1857	New York	Oppositionist	1824–1889
Seth Wakeman	1871–1873	New York	Republican	1811–1880
David S. Walbridge	1855–1859	Michigan	Republican	1802–1868
Henry S. Walbridge	1851–1853	New York	Whig	1801–1869
Hiram Walbridge	1853–1855	New York	Democratic	1821–1870
Greg Walden	1999–2021	Oregon	Republican	1957–present
Hiram Walden	1849–1851	New York	Democratic	1800–1880
Madison Miner Walden	1871–1873	Iowa	Republican	1836–1891
Jerome Waldie	1966–1975	California	Democratic	1925–2009
George E. Waldo	1905–1909	New York	Republican	1851–1942
Loren P. Waldo	1849–1851	Connecticut	Democratic	1802–1881
Alton Waldon	1986–1987	New York	Democratic	1936–2023
William F. Waldow	1917–1919	New York	Republican	1882–1930
Alfred M. Waldron	1933–1935	Pennsylvania	Republican	1865–1952
Henry Waldron	1855–1861; 1871–1877	Michigan	Republican	1819–1880
George Edward Wales	1825–1829	Vermont	National Republican	1792–1860
Doug Walgren	1977–1991	Pennsylvania	Democratic	1940–present
Amasa Walker	1862–1863	Massachusetts	Republican	1799–1875
Benjamin Walker	1801–1803	New York	Federalist	1753–1818
Charles C. B. Walker	1875–1877	New York	Democratic	1824–1888
David Walker	1817–1820	Kentucky	Democratic-Republican	17??–1820
E. S. Johnny Walker	1965–1969	New Mexico	Democratic	1911–2000
Felix Walker	1817–1823	North Carolina	Democratic-Republican	1753–1828
Francis Walker	1793–1795	Virginia	Anti-Administration	1764–1806
Gilbert C. Walker	1875–1879	Virginia	Democratic	1833–1885
James A. Walker	1895–1899	Virginia	Republican	1832–1901
James P. Walker	1887–1890	Missouri	Democratic	1851–1890
John R. Walker	1913–1919	Georgia	Democratic	1874–1942
Joseph H. Walker	1889–1899	Massachusetts	Republican	1829–1907
Lewis L. Walker	1929–1931	Kentucky	Republican	1873–1944
Mark Walker	2015–2021	North Carolina	Republican	1969–present
Percy Walker	1855–1857	Alabama	American	1812–1880
Prentiss Walker	1965–1967	Mississippi	Republican	1917–1998
Robert Jarvis Cochran Walker	1881–1883	Pennsylvania	Republican	1838–1903
Bob Walker	1977–1997	Pennsylvania	Republican	1942–present
William Adams Walker	1853–1855	New York	Democratic	1805–1861
William Wall	1861–1863	New York	Republican	1800–1872
Alexander S. Wallace	1870–1877	South Carolina	Republican	1810–1893
Daniel Wallace	1848–1853	South Carolina	Democratic	1801–1859
David Wallace	1841–1843	Indiana	Whig	1799-1859
James M. Wallace	1815–1821	Pennsylvania	Democratic-Republican	1750–1823
John Winfield Wallace	1861–1863; 1875–1877	Pennsylvania	Republican	1818–1889
Jonathan H. Wallace	1884–1885	Ohio	Democratic	1824–1892
Nathaniel D. Wallace	1886–1887	Louisiana	Democratic	1845–1894
Robert M. Wallace	1903–1911	Arkansas	Democratic	1856–1942
Rodney Wallace	1889–1891	Massachusetts	Republican	1823–1903
William C. Wallace	1889–1891	New York	Republican	1856–1901
William H. Wallace	1861–1863; 1864–1865	Idaho; Washington	Republican	1811–1879
Samuel H. Walley	1853–1855	Massachusetts	Whig	1805–1877
Monrad Wallgren	1933–1940	Washington	Democratic	1891–1961
George M. Wallhauser	1959–1965	New Jersey	Republican	1900–1993
Samuel Wallin	1913–1915	New York	Republican	1856–1917
Ansel T. Walling	1875–1877	Ohio	Democratic	1824–1896
Josiah T. Walls	1871–1873; 1873–1876	Florida	Republican	1842–1905
Robert Waln	1798–1801	Pennsylvania	Federalist	1765–1836
Jackie Walorski	2013–2022	Indiana	Republican	1963–2022
Allan B. Walsh	1913–1915	New Jersey	Democratic	1874–1953
James J. Walsh	1895–1896	New York	Democratic	1858–1909
James T. Walsh	1989–2009	New York	Republican	1947–present
Joe Walsh	2011–2013	Illinois	Republican	1961–present
John R. Walsh	1949–1951	Indiana	Democratic	1913–1975
Joseph Walsh	1915–1922	Massachusetts	Republican	1875–1946
Michael Walsh	1853–1855	New York	Democratic	1810–1859
Thomas Yates Walsh	1851–1853	Maryland	Whig	1809–1865
William Walsh	1875–1879	Maryland	Democratic	1828–1892
William F. Walsh	1973–1979	New York	Republican	1912–2011
Francis E. Walter	1933–1963	Pennsylvania	Democratic	1894–1963
Anderson H. Walters	1913-1915; 1919-1923; 1925-1927	Pennsylvania	Republican	1862–1927
Mimi Walters	2015–2019	California	Republican	1962–present
Charles W. Walton	1861–1862	Maine	Republican	1819–1900
E. P. Walton	1857–1863	Vermont	Republican	1812–1890
Matthew Walton	1803–1807	Kentucky	Democratic-Republican	1750–1819
William B. Walton	1917–1919	New Mexico	Democratic	1871–1939
Mike Waltz	2019–2025	Florida	Republican	1974–present
Reuben H. Walworth	1821–1823	New York	Democratic–Republican	1788–1867
Tim Walz	2007–2019	Minnesota	Democratic	1964–present
Zach Wamp	1995–2011	Tennessee	Republican	1957–present
Fred Wampler	1959–1961	Indiana	Democratic	1909–1999
William C. Wampler	1953–1955; 1967–1983	Virginia	Republican	1926–2012
Irving Price Wanger	1893-1911	Pennsylvania	Republican	1852–1940
Herbert Warburton	1953–1955	Delaware	Republican	1916–1983
Stanton Warburton	1911–1913	Washington	Republican	1865–1926
Aaron Ward	1825–1829	New York	National Republican	1790–1867
Aaron Ward	1831–1837; 1841–1843	New York	Democratic	1790–1867
Andrew H. Ward	1866–1867	Kentucky	Democratic	1815–1904
Artemas Ward	1791–1795	Massachusetts	Pro-Administration	1727–1800
Artemas Ward Jr.	1813–1817	Massachusetts	Federalist	1762–1847
Charles B. Ward	1915–1925	New York	Republican	1879–1946
David Jenkins Ward	1939–1945	Maryland	Democratic	1871–1961
Elijah Ward	1857–1859; 1861–1865; 1875–1877	New York	Democratic	1816–1882
Hallett Sydney Ward	1921–1925	North Carolina	Democratic	1870–1956
Hamilton Ward Sr.	1865–1871	New York	Republican	1829–1898
James Hugh Ward	1885–1887	Illinois	Democratic	1853–1916
Jasper D. Ward	1873–1875	Illinois	Republican	1829–1902
Jonathan Ward	1815–1817	New York	Democratic–Republican	1768–1842
Marcus Lawrence Ward	1873–1875	New Jersey	Republican	1812–1884
Mike Ward	1995–1997	Kentucky	Democratic	1951–present
Thomas Ward	1813–1817	New Jersey	Democratic-Republican	c. 1759–1842
Thomas B. Ward	1883–1887	Indiana	Democratic	1835–1892
William Ward	1877-1893	Pennsylvania	Republican	1837–1895
William L. Ward	1897–1899	New York	Republican	1856–1933
William Thomas Ward	1851–1853	Kentucky	Whig	1808–1878
Daniel Wardwell	1831–1837	New York	Democratic	1791–1878
John H. Ware III	1970–1975	Pennsylvania	Republican	1908–1997
Orie S. Ware	1927–1929	Kentucky	Democratic	1882–1974
Henry Ridgely Warfield	1819–1821	Maryland	Democratic-Republican	1774–1839
Henry Ridgely Warfield	1821–1825	Maryland	Federalist	1774–1839
Adoniram J. Warner	1879–1881; 1883–1887	Ohio	Democratic	1834–1910
Hiram B. Warner	1855–1857	Georgia	Democratic	1802–1881
J. De Witt Warner	1891–1895	New York	Democratic	1851–1925
Levi Warner	1876–1879	Connecticut	Democratic	1831–1911
Richard Warner	1881–1885	Tennessee	Democratic	1835–1915
Samuel L. Warner	1865–1867	Connecticut	Republican	1828–1893
Vespasian Warner	1895–1905	Illinois	Republican	1842–1925
William Warner	1885–1889	Missouri	Republican	1840–1916
William R. Warnock	1901–1905	Ohio	Republican	1838–1918
Cornelius Warren	1847–1849	New York	Whig	1790–1849
Edward A. Warren	1853–1855; 1857–1859	Arkansas	Democratic	1818–1875
Joseph M. Warren	1871–1873	New York	Democratic	1813–1896
Lindsay C. Warren	1925–1940	North Carolina	Democratic	1889–1976
Lott Warren	1839–1843	Georgia	Whig	1797–1861
William W. Warren	1875–1877	Massachusetts	Democratic	1834–1880
John G. Warwick	1891–1892	Ohio	Democratic	1830–1892
Cadwallader C. Washburn	1855–1861; 1867–1871	Wisconsin	Republican	1818–1882
Charles G. Washburn	1906–1911	Massachusetts	Republican	1857–1928
Henry D. Washburn	1866–1869	Indiana	Republican	1832–1871
Israel Washburn Jr.	1851–1855	Maine	Whig	1813–1883
Israel Washburn Jr.	1855–1861	Maine	Republican	1813–1883
William B. Washburn	1863–1871	Massachusetts	Republican	1820–1887
William D. Washburn	1879–1885	Minnesota	Republican	1831–1912
Elihu B. Washburne	1853–1855	Illinois	Whig	1816–1887
Elihu B. Washburne	1855–1869	Illinois	Republican	1816–1887
Craig Washington	1989–1995	Texas	Democratic	1941–present
George C. Washington	1827–1833; 1835–1837	Maryland	National Republican	1789–1854
Harold Washington	1981–1983	Illinois	Democratic	1922–1987
Joseph E. Washington	1887–1897	Tennessee	Democratic	1851–1915
William Henry Washington	1841–1843	North Carolina	Whig	1813–1860
Thaddeus Wasielewski	1941–1947	Wisconsin	Democratic	1904–1976
Frank Hinman Waskey	1906–1907	Alaska	Democratic	1875–1964
Edward Hills Wason	1915–1933	New Hampshire	Republican	1865–1941
Russell J. Waters	1899–1901	California	Republican	1843–1911
Albert Galiton Watkins	1849–1853	Tennessee	Whig	1818–1895
Albert Galiton Watkins	1855–1859	Tennessee	Democratic	1818–1895
Elton Watkins	1923–1925	Oregon	Democratic	1881–1956
George Watkins	1965-1970	Pennsylvania	Republican	1902–1970
John T. Watkins	1905–1921	Louisiana	Democratic	1854–1925
Steve Watkins	2019–2021	Kansas	Republican	1976–present
Wes Watkins	1977–1991	Oklahoma	Democratic	1938–2025
Wes Watkins	1997–2003	Oklahoma	Republican	1938–2025
John Goddard Watmough	1831–1835	Pennsylvania	National Republican	1793–1861
Laurence Hawley Watres	1923-1931	Pennsylvania	Republican	1882–1964
Albert Watson	1963–1965	South Carolina	Democratic	1922–1994
Albert Watson	1965–1971	South Carolina	Republican	1922–1994
Cooper K. Watson	1855–1857	Ohio	Republican	1810–1880
David K. Watson	1895–1897	Ohio	Republican	1849–1918
Diane Watson	2001–2011	California	Democratic	1933–present
Henry Winfield Watson	1915-1933	Pennsylvania	Republican	1856–1933
James E. Watson	1895–1897; 1899–1909	Indiana	Republican	1864–1948
Lewis Findlay Watson	1877-1879; 1881-1883; 1889-1890	Pennsylvania	Republican	1819–1890
Thomas E. Watson	1891–1893	Georgia	Populist	1856–1922
Walter Allen Watson	1913–1919	Virginia	Democratic	1867–1919
Mel Watt	1993–2014	North Carolina	Democratic	1945–present
Harvey Magee Watterson	1839–1843	Tennessee	Democratic	1811–1891
Henry Watterson	1876–1877	Kentucky	Democratic	1840–1921
J. C. Watts	1995–2003	Oklahoma	Republican	1957–present
John Watts	1793–1795	New York	Pro-Administration	1749–1836
John C. Watts	1951–1971	Kentucky	Democratic	1902–1971
John Sebrie Watts	1861–1863	New Mexico	Republican	1816–1876
Daniel W. Waugh	1891–1895	Indiana	Republican	1842–1921
Henry Waxman	1975–2015	California	Republican	1939–present
Anthony Wayne	1791–1792	Georgia	Anti-Administration	1745–1796
Isaac Wayne	1823–1825	Pennsylvania	Federalist	1772–1852
James Moore Wayne	1829–1835	Georgia	Democratic	1790–1867
Thomas A. E. Weadock	1891–1895	Michigan	Democratic	1850–1938
Robert Weakley	1809–1811	Tennessee	Democratic-Republican	1764–1845
Otha Wearin	1933–1939	Iowa	Democratic	1903–1990
Zadoc L. Weatherford	1940–1941	Alabama	Democratic	1888–1983
Archibald J. Weaver	1883–1887	Nebraska	Republican	1843–1887
Claude Weaver	1913–1915	Oklahoma	Democratic	1867–1954
James B. Weaver	1879–1881; 1885–1889	Iowa	Greenbacker	1833–1912
James D. Weaver	1963–1965	Pennsylvania	Republican	1920–2003
Jim Weaver	1975–1987	Oregon	Democratic	1927–2020
Phillip Hart Weaver	1955–1963	Nebraska	Republican	1919–1989
Walter L. Weaver	1897–1901	Ohio	Republican	1851–1909
Zebulon Weaver	1917–1919; 1919–1929; 1931–1947	North Carolina	Democratic	1872–1948
Edwin Y. Webb	1903–1919	North Carolina	Democratic	1872–1955
Amos R. Webber	1904–1907	Ohio	Republican	1852–1948
George W. Webber	1881–1883	Michigan	Republican	1825–1900
Ed Weber	1981–1983	Ohio	Republican	1931–2023
John B. Weber	1885–1889	New York	Republican	1842–1926
Vin Weber	1981–1993	Minnesota	Republican	1952–present
Daniel Webster	1813–1817	New Hampshire	Federalist	1782–1852
Daniel Webster	1823–1827	Massachusetts	National Republican	1782–1852
Edwin Hanson Webster	1859–1861	Maryland	American	1829–1893
Edwin Hanson Webster	1861–1863	Maryland	Unionist	1829–1893
Edwin Hanson Webster	1863–1865	Maryland	Unconditional Unionist	1829–1893
J. Stanley Webster	1919–1923	Washington	Republican	1877–1962
Taylor Webster	1833–1839	Ohio	Democratic	1800–1876
William Wedemeyer	1911–1913	Michigan	Republican	1873–1913
Edgar Weeks	1899–1903	Michigan	Republican	1839–1904
John E. Weeks	1931–1933	Vermont	Republican	1853–1949
John W. Weeks	1829–1833	New Hampshire	Democratic	1781–1853
John W. Weeks	1905–1913	Massachusetts	Republican	1860–1926
Joseph Weeks	1835–1839	New Hampshire	Democratic	1773–1845
Capell L. Weems	1903–1909	Ohio	Republican	1860–1913
John Crompton Weems	1826–1829	Maryland	Democratic	1778–1862
Knud Wefald	1923–1927	Minnesota	Farmer-Labor	1869–1936
Alvin F. Weichel	1943–1955	Ohio	Republican	1891–1956
Lowell Weicker	1969–1971	Connecticut	Republican	1931–2023
Carl M. Weideman	1933–1935	Michigan	Democratic	1898–1972
Richard Hanson Weightman	1851–1853	New Mexico	Democratic	1816–1861
Anthony Weiner	1999–2011	New York	Democratic	1964–present
Jessica M. Weis	1959–1963	New York	Republican	1901–1963
Samuel A. Weiss	1941–1946	Pennsylvania	Democratic	1902–1977
Ted Weiss	1977–1992	New York	Democratic	1927–1992
Charles H. Weisse	1903–1911	Wisconsin	Democratic	1866–1919
John Welborn	1905–1907	Missouri	Republican	1857–1907
Frank Welch	1877–1878	Nebraska	Republican	1835–1878
John Welch	1851–1853	Ohio	Whig	1805–1891
Phil J. Welch	1949–1953	Missouri	Democratic	1895–1963
Richard J. Welch	1926–1949	California	Republican	1869–1949
William W. Welch	1855–1857	Connecticut	American	1818–1892
Curt Weldon	1987–2007	Pennsylvania	Republican	1947–present
Dave Weldon	1995–2009	Florida	Republican	1953–present
Martin Welker	1865–1871	Ohio	Republican	1819–1902
Marshall Johnson Wellborn	1849–1851	Georgia	Democratic	1808–1874
Olin Wellborn	1879–1887	Texas	Democratic	1843–1921
Jerry Weller	1995–2009	Illinois	Republican	1957–present
John B. Weller	1839–1845	Ohio	Democratic	1812–1875
Luman Hamlin Weller	1883–1885	Iowa	Greenbacker	1833–1914
Royal Hurlburt Weller	1923–1929	New York	Democratic	1881–1929
Milton H. Welling	1917–1921	Utah	Democratic	1876–1947
George L. Wellington	1895–1897	Maryland	Republican	1852–1927
Alfred Wells	1859–1861	New York	Republican	1814–1867
Daniel Wells Jr.	1853–1857	Wisconsin	Democratic	1808–1902
Erastus Wells	1869–1877; 1879–1881	Missouri	Democratic	1823–1893
Guilford Wiley Wells	1875–1877	Mississippi	Independent Republican	1840–1909
John Wells	1851–1853	New York	Whig	1817–1877
Owen A. Wells	1893–1895	Wisconsin	Democratic	1844–1935
George Austin Welsh	1923-1932	Pennsylvania	Republican	1878–1970
Peter Welch	2007-2023	Vermont	Democratic	1947–present
Charles L. Weltner	1963–1967	Georgia	Democratic	1927–1992
Benjamin F. Welty	1917–1921	Ohio	Democratic	1870–1962
Edward Wemple	1883–1885	New York	Democratic	1843–1920
Peter H. Wendover	1815–1821	New York	Democratic-Republican	1768–1834
Elmer H. Wene	1937–1939; 1941–1945	New Jersey	Democratic	1892–1957
Brad Wenstrup	2013–2025	Ohio	Republican	1958–present
John Wentworth	1843–1851; 1853–1855	Illinois	Democratic	1815–1888
John Wentworth	1865–1867	Illinois	Republican	1815–1888
Tappan Wentworth	1853–1855	Massachusetts	Whig	1802–1875
Thomas H. Werdel	1949–1953	California	Republican	1905–1966
Theodore B. Werner	1933–1937	South Dakota	Democratic	1892–1989
George M. Wertz	1923-1925	Pennsylvania	Republican	1856–1928
Allen West	2011–2013	Florida	Republican	1961–present
Charles F. West	1931–1935	Ohio	Democratic	1895–1955
George West	1881–1883; 1885–1889	New York	Republican	1823–1901
Milton H. West	1933–1948	Texas	Democratic	1888–1948
John Westbrook	1841-1843	Pennsylvania	Democratic	1789–1852
Theodoric R. Westbrook	1853–1855	New York	Democratic	1821–1885
Rensselaer Westerlo	1817–1819	New York	Federalist	1776–1851
Jack Westland	1953–1965	Washington	Republican	1904–1982
Lynn Westmoreland	2005–2017	Georgia	Republican	1950–present
John Wethered	1843–1845	Maryland	Whig	1809–1888
John M. Wever	1891–1895	New York	Republican	1847–1914
Robert Wexler	1997–2010	Florida	Democratic	1961–present
Jennifer Wexton	2019–2025	Virginia	Democratic	1968–present
Robert Weygand	1997–2001	Rhode Island	Democratic	1948–present
George W. Weymouth	1897–1901	Massachusetts	Republican	1850–1910
Charles W. Whalen Jr.	1967–1979	Ohio	Republican	1920–2011
Kellian Whaley	1861–1863	Virginia	Unionist	1821–1876
Kellian Whaley	1863–1867	West Virginia	Unconditional Unionist	1821–1876
Richard S. Whaley	1913–1921	South Carolina	Democratic	1874–1951
J. Irving Whalley	1960-1973	Pennsylvania	Republican	1902–1980
Reuben Whallon	1833–1835	New York	Democratic	1776–1843
Charles S. Wharton	1905–1907	Illinois	Republican	1875–1939
J. Ernest Wharton	1951–1965	New York	Republican	1899–1990
Jesse Wharton	1807–1809	Tennessee	Democratic-Republican	1782–1833
Alan Wheat	1983–1995	Missouri	Democratic	1951–present
William H. Wheat	1939–1944	Illinois	Republican	1879–1944
Horace Wheaton	1843–1847	New York	Democratic	1803–1882
Laban Wheaton	1809–1817	Massachusetts	Federalist	1754–1846
Charles K. Wheeler	1897–1903	Kentucky	Democratic	1863–1933
Ezra Wheeler	1863–1865	Wisconsin	Democratic	1820–1871
Frank W. Wheeler	1889–1891	Michigan	Republican	1853–1921
Grattan H. Wheeler	1831–1833	New York	Anti-Masonic	1783–1852
Hamilton K. Wheeler	1893–1895	Illinois	Republican	1848–1918
Harrison H. Wheeler	1891–1893	Michigan	Democratic	1839–1896
John Wheeler	1853–1857	New York	Democratic	1823–1906
Joseph Wheeler	1881–1882; 1883; 1885–1900	Alabama	Democratic	1836–1906
Loren E. Wheeler	1915–1923; 1925–1927	Illinois	Republican	1862–1932
Nelson Platt Wheeler	1907-1911	Pennsylvania	Republican	1841–1920
William A. Wheeler	1861–1863; 1869–1877	New York	Republican	1819–1887
William M. Wheeler	1947–1955	Georgia	Democratic	1915–1989
B. Frank Whelchel	1935–1945	Georgia	Democratic	1895–1954
Thomas Whipple Jr.	1821–1825	New Hampshire	Democratic-Republican	1787–1835
Thomas Whipple Jr.	1825–1829	New Hampshire	National Republican	1787–1835
John J. Whitacre	1911–1915	Ohio	Democratic	1860–1938
John A. Whitaker	1948–1951	Kentucky	Democratic	1901–1951
Addison White	1851–1853	Kentucky	Whig	1824–1909
Albert Smith White	1837–1839	Indiana	Whig	1803–1864
Albert Smith White	1861–1863	Indiana	Republican	1803–1864
Alexander White	1789–1793	Virginia	Pro-Administration	1738–1804
Alexander White	1851–1853	Alabama	Whig	1816–1893
Alexander White	1873–1875	Alabama	Republican	1816–1893
Alexander Colwell White	1885–1887	Pennsylvania	Republican	1833–1906
Allison White	1857-1859	Pennsylvania	Democratic	1816–1886
Bartow White	1825–1827	New York	National Republican	1776–1862
Benjamin White	1843–1845	Maine	Democratic	1790–1860
Campbell P. White	1829–1835	New York	Democratic	1787–1859
Cecil F. White	1949–1951	California	Democratic	1900–1992
Chilton A. White	1861–1865	Ohio	Democratic	1826–1900
Compton I. White	1933–1947; 1949–1951	Idaho	Democratic	1877–1956
Compton I. White Jr.	1963–1967	Idaho	Democratic	1920–1998
David White	1823–1825	Kentucky	Democratic-Republican	1785–1834
Dudley A. White	1937–1941	Ohio	Republican	1901–1957
Edward D. White Sr.	1829–1834	Louisiana	National Republican	1795–1847
Edward D. White Sr.	1839–1843	Louisiana	Whig	1795–1847
Francis White	1813–1815	Virginia	Federalist	1761–1826
Frederick Edward White	1891–1893	Iowa	Democratic	1844–1920
George White	1911–1915; 1917–1919	Ohio	Democratic	1872–1953
George E. White	1895–1899	Illinois	Republican	1848–1935
George Henry White	1897–1901	North Carolina	Republican	1852–1918
Harry White	1877-1881	Pennsylvania	Republican	1834–1920
Hays B. White	1919–1929	Kansas	Republican	1855–1930
Hugh White	1845–1851	New York	Whig	1798–1870
James B. White	1887–1889	Indiana	Republican	1835–1897
James Bamford White	1901–1903	Kentucky	Democratic	1842–1931
James White	1794–1796	Southwest	None	1749–1809
John White	1835–1845	Kentucky	Whig	1802–1845
John D. White	1875–1877; 1881–1885	Kentucky	Republican	1849–1920
Joseph L. White	1841–1843	Indiana	Whig	c. 1813–1861
Joseph M. White	1825–1837	Florida	None	1781–1839
Joseph W. White	1863–1865	Ohio	Democratic	1822–1892
Leonard White	1811–1813	Massachusetts	Federalist	1767–1849
Michael D. White	1877–1879	Indiana	Republican	1827–1917
Milo White	1883–1887	Minnesota	Republican	1830–1913
Phineas White	1821–1823	Vermont	Democratic-Republican	1770–1847
Richard Crawford White	1965–1983	Texas	Democratic	1923–1998
Rick White	1995–1999	Washington	Republican	1953–present
S. Harrison White	1927–1929	Colorado	Democratic	1864-1945
Stephen V. White	1887–1889	New York	Republican	1831-1913
Wallace H. White Jr.	1917–1931	Maine	Republican	1877-1952
Wilbur M. White	1931–1933	Ohio	Republican	1890-1973
William J. White	1893–1895	Ohio	Republican	1850-1923
John Whiteaker	1879–1881	Oregon	Democratic	1820-1902
Joseph Whitehead	1925–1931	Virginia	Democratic	1867-1938
Thomas Whitehead	1873–1875	Virginia	Democratic	1825-1901
James Whitehill	1813–1814	Pennsylvania	Democratic-Republican	1762–1822
John Whitehill	1803–1807	Pennsylvania	Democratic-Republican	1729-1815
Robert Whitehill	1805–1813	Pennsylvania	Democratic-Republican	1738-1813
John O. Whitehouse	1873–1877	New York	Democratic	1817–1881
G. William Whitehurst	1969–1987	Virginia	Republican	1925–2026
Robert Henry Whitelaw	1890–1891	Missouri	Democratic	1854–1937
Richard H. Whiteley	1870–1875	Georgia	Republican	1830–1890
William G. Whiteley	1857–1861	Delaware	Democratic	1819–1886
Basil Lee Whitener	1957–1969	North Carolina	Democratic	1915–1989
John Whiteside	1815–1819	Pennsylvania	Democratic-Republican	1773–1830
Ed Whitfield	1995–2016	Kentucky	Republican	1943–present
John W. Whitfield	1854–1856; 1856–1857	Kansas	Democratic	1818–1879
Justin Rice Whiting	1887–1895	Michigan	Democratic	1847–1903
Richard H. Whiting	1875–1877	Illinois	Republican	1826–1888
William Whiting	1873	Massachusetts	Republican	1813–1873
William Whiting II	1883–1889	Massachusetts	Republican	1841–1911
Charles Orville Whitley	1977–1986	North Carolina	Democratic	1927–2002
James L. Whitley	1929–1935	New York	Republican	1872–1959
Ezekiel Whitman	1809–1811; 1817–1821	Massachusetts	Federalist	1776–1866
Ezekiel Whitman	1821–1822	Maine	Federalist	1776–1866
Lemuel Whitman	1823–1825	Connecticut	Democratic-Republican	1780–1841
Elias Whitmore	1825–1827	New York	National Republican	1772–1853
George W. Whitmore	1870–1871	Texas	Republican	1824–1876
Thomas R. Whitney	1855–1857	New York	American	1807–1858
Bob Whittaker	1979–1991	Kansas	Republican	1939–present
Benjamin Franklin Whittemore	1868–1870	South Carolina	Republican	1824–1894
Jamie Whitten	1941–1995	Mississippi	Democratic	1910-1995
Washington C. Whitthorne	1871–1883; 1887–1891	Tennessee	Democratic	1825–1891
William M. Whittington	1925–1951	Mississippi	Democratic	1878–1962
Elisha Whittlesey	1823–1825	Ohio	Democratic-Republican	1783–1863
Elisha Whittlesey	1825–1833	Ohio	National Republican	1783–1863
Elisha Whittlesey	1833–1835	Ohio	Anti-Masonic	1783–1863
Elisha Whittlesey	1835–1838	Ohio	Whig	1783–1863
Frederick Whittlesey	1831–1835	New York	Anti-Masonic	1799–1851
Thomas T. Whittlesey	1836–1839	Connecticut	Democratic	1798–1868
William A. Whittlesey	1849–1851	Ohio	Democratic	1796–1866
William W. Wick	1839–1841; 1845–1849	Indiana	Democratic	1796–1868
Roger Wicker	1995–2007	Mississippi	Republican	1951–present
James Wickersham	1909–1917; 1919; 1921; 1931–1933	Alaska	Independent	1857–1939
Victor Wickersham	1941–1947; 1949–1957; 1961–1965	Oklahoma	Democratic	1906–1988
Eliphalet Wickes	1805–1807	New York	Democratic–Republican	1769–1850
Charles Preston Wickham	1887–1891	Ohio	Republican	1836–1925
Charles A. Wickliffe	1823–1825	Kentucky	Democratic-Republican	1788–1869
Charles A. Wickliffe	1825–1833	Kentucky	Democratic	1788–1869
Charles A. Wickliffe	1861–1863	Kentucky	Unionist	1788–1869
Robert Charles Wickliffe	1909–1912	Louisiana	Democratic	1874–1912
William Widgery	1811–1813	Massachusetts	Democratic-Republican	c. 1753–1822
William B. Widnall	1950–1974	New Jersey	Republican	1906–1983
Roy Wier	1949–1961	Minnesota	Democratic-Farmer-Labor	1888–1963
Charles E. Wiggins	1967–1979	California	Republican	1927–2000
Peter D. Wigginton	1875–1877; 1878–1879	California	Democratic	1839–1890
Richard B. Wigglesworth	1928–1958	Massachusetts	Republican	1891–1960
Scott Wike	1875–1877; 1889–1893	Illinois	Democratic	1834–1901
David Wilber	1873–1875; 1879–1881; 1887–1890	New York	Republican	1820–1890
David F. Wilber	1895–1899	New York	Republican	1859–1928
Isaac Wilbour	1807–1809	Rhode Island	Democratic-Republican	1763–1837
J. Mark Wilcox	1933–1939	Florida	Democratic	1890–1956
Jeduthun Wilcox	1813–1817	New Hampshire	Federalist	1768–1838
John Allen Wilcox	1851–1853	Mississippi	Unionist	1819–1864
Robert William Wilcox	1900–1903	Hawaii	Home Rule	1855–1903
Susan Wild	2018–2025	Pennsylvania	Democratic	1957–present
Richard Henry Wilde	1815–1817; 1825	Georgia	Democratic-Republican	1789–1847
Richard Henry Wilde	1827–1835	Georgia	Democratic	1789–1847
Abel Carter Wilder	1863–1865	Kansas	Republican	1828–1875
William Wilder	1911–1913	Massachusetts	Republican	1855–1913
Zalmon Wildman	1835	Connecticut	Democratic	1775–1835
Isaac Wildrick	1849–1853	New Jersey	Democratic	1803–1892
Ariosto A. Wiley	1901–1908	Alabama	Democratic	1848–1908
James S. Wiley	1847–1849	Maine	Democratic	1808–1891
John M. Wiley	1889–1891	New York	Democratic	1841–1912
Oliver C. Wiley	1908–1909	Alabama	Democratic	1851–1917
William H. Wiley	1903–1907; 1909–1911	New Jersey	Republican	1842–1925
James W. Wilkin	1815–1819	New York	Democratic–Republican	1762–1845
Samuel J. Wilkin	1831–1833	New York	National Republican	1793–1866
Beriah Wilkins	1883–1889	Ohio	Democratic	1846–1905
William Wilkins	1831-1834; 1843-1844	Pennsylvania	Democratic	1779–1865
Morton S. Wilkinson	1869–1871	Minnesota	Republican	1819–1894
Theodore S. Wilkinson	1887–1891	Louisiana	Democratic	1847–1921
Charles W. Willard	1869–1875	Vermont	Republican	1827–1880
George Willard	1873–1877	Michigan	Republican	1824–1901
Washington F. Willcox	1889–1893	Connecticut	Democratic	1834–1909
William Willett Jr.	1907–1911	New York	Democratic	1869–1938
Earle D. Willey	1943–1945	Delaware	Republican	1889–1950
Albert C. Willford	1933–1935	Iowa	Democratic	1877–1937
Alpheus S. Williams	1875–1878	Michigan	Democratic	1810–1878
Andrew Williams	1875–1879	New York	Republican	1828–1907
A. H. A. Williams	1891–1893	North Carolina	Democratic	1842–1895
Arthur B. Williams	1923–1925	Michigan	Republican	1872–1925
Benjamin Williams	1793–1795	North Carolina	Anti-Administration	1751–1814
Brandon Williams	2023–2025	New York	Republican	1967–present
Charles G. Williams	1873–1883	Wisconsin	Republican	1829–1892
Christopher Harris Williams	1837–1843; 1849–1853	Tennessee	Whig	1798–1857
Clyde Williams	1927–1929; 1931–1943	Missouri	Democratic	1873–1954
David Rogerson Williams	1805–1809; 1811–1813	South Carolina	Democratic-Republican	1776–1830
Elihu S. Williams	1887–1891	Ohio	Republican	1835–1903
George F. Williams	1891–1893	Massachusetts	Democratic	1852–1932
George S. Williams	1939–1941	Delaware	Republican	1877–1961
Guinn Williams	1922–1933	Texas	Democratic	1871–1948
Harrison A. Williams	1953–1957	New Jersey	Democratic	1919–2001
Henry Williams	1839–1841; 1843–1845	Massachusetts	Democratic	1805–1887
Hezekiah Williams	1845–1849	Maine	Democratic	1798–1856
Isaac Williams Jr.	1813–1815; 1817–1819; 1823–1825	New York	Democratic–Republican	1777–1860
James Williams	1875–1879	Delaware	Democratic	1825–1899
James D. Williams	1875–1876	Indiana	Democratic	1808–1880
James R. Williams	1889–1895; 1899–1905	Illinois	Democratic	1850–1923
James Wray Williams	1841–1842	Maryland	Democratic	1792–1842
Jared Williams	1819–1825	Virginia	Democratic-Republican	1766–1831
Jared W. Williams	1837–1841	New Hampshire	Democratic	1796–1864
Jeremiah Norman Williams	1875–1879	Alabama	Democratic	1829–1915
John Williams	1795–1799	New York	Federalist	1752–1806
John Williams	1855–1857	New York	Democratic	1807-1875
John Bell Williams	1947–1968	Mississippi	Democratic	1918–1983
John M. S. Williams	1873–1875	Massachusetts	Republican	1818–1886
John Sharp Williams	1893–1909	Mississippi	Democratic	1854–1932
Jonathan Williams	1815	Pennsylvania	Democratic-Republican	1751–1815
Joseph Lanier Williams	1837–1843	Tennessee	Whig	1810–1865
Lawrence G. Williams	1967-1975	Pennsylvania	Republican	1913–1975
Lemuel Williams	1799–1805	Massachusetts	Federalist	1747–1828
Lewis Williams	1815–1825	North Carolina	Democratic-Republican	1782–1842
Lewis Williams	1825–1837	North Carolina	National Republican	1782–1842
Lewis Williams	1837–1842	North Carolina	Whig	1782–1842
Lyle Williams	1979–1985	Ohio	Republican	1942–2008
Marmaduke Williams	1803–1809	North Carolina	Democratic-Republican	1774–1850
Morgan B. Williams	1897-1899	Pennsylvania	Republican	1831-1903
Nathan Williams	1805–1807	New York	Democratic–Republican	1773-1835
Pat Williams	1979–1997	Montana	Democratic	1937–2025
Richard Williams	1877–1879	Oregon	Republican	1836–1914
Robert Williams	1797–1803	North Carolina	Democratic-Republican	1773–1836
Seward H. Williams	1915–1917	Ohio	Republican	1870–1922
Sherrod Williams	1835–1841	Kentucky	Whig	1804–????
Thomas Williams	1863–1869	Pennsylvania	Republican	1806–1872
Thomas Williams	1879–1885	Alabama	Democratic	1825–1903
Thomas Scott Williams	1817–1819	Connecticut	Federalist	1777–1861
Thomas Sutler Williams	1915–1929	Illinois	Republican	1872–1940
Thomas W. Williams	1839–1843	Connecticut	Whig	1789–1874
William Williams	1867–1875	Indiana	Republican	1821–1896
William Williams	1871–1873	New York	Democratic	1815–1876
William B. Williams	1873–1877	Michigan	Republican	1826–1905
William E. Williams	1899–1901; 1913–1917	Illinois	Democratic	1857–1921
William R. Williams	1951–1959	New York	Republican	1884–1972
Hugh Williamson	1790–1793	North Carolina	Pro-Administration	1735–1819
John N. Williamson	1903–1907	Oregon	Republican	1855–1943
William Williamson	1921–1933	South Dakota	Republican	1875–1972
William D. Williamson	1821–1823	Maine	Democratic-Republican	1779–1846
Asa H. Willie	1873–1875	Texas	Democratic	1829–1899
Albert S. Willis	1877–1887	Kentucky	Democratic	1843–1897
Benjamin A. Willis	1875–1879	New York	Democratic	1840–1886
Edwin E. Willis	1949–1969	Louisiana	Democratic	1904–1972
Francis Willis	1791–1793	Georgia	Anti-Administration	1745–1829
Frank B. Willis	1911–1915	Ohio	Republican	1871–1928
Jonathan S. Willis	1895–1897	Delaware	Republican	1830–1903
Edwin Willits	1877–1883	Michigan	Republican	1830–1896
Westel Willoughby Jr.	1815–1817	New York	Democratic–Republican	1769–1844
David Wilmot	1845-1851	Pennsylvania	Democratic	1814–1868
William W. Wilshire	1873–1874	Arkansas	Republican	1830–1888
William W. Wilshire	1875–1877	Arkansas	Democratic	1830–1888
Alexander Wilson	1804–1809	Virginia	Democratic-Republican	N/A
Benjamin Wilson	1875–1883	West Virginia	Democratic	1825–1901
Bob Wilson	1953–1981	California	Republican	1916–1999
Charles H. Wilson	1963–1981	California	Democratic	1917–1984
Charlie Wilson	1973–1997	Texas	Democratic	1933–2010
Charlie Wilson	2007–2011	Ohio	Democratic	1943–2013
Earl Wilson	1941–1959; 1961–1965	Indiana	Republican	1906–1990
Edgar Wilson	1895–1897	Idaho	Republican	1861–1915
Edgar Wilson	1899–1901	Idaho	Silver Republican	1861–1915
Edgar C. Wilson	1833–1835	Virginia	National Republican	1800–1860
Emmett Wilson	1913–1917	Florida	Democratic	1882–1918
Ephraim King Wilson	1827–1829	Maryland	National Republican	1771–1834
Ephraim King Wilson	1829–1831	Maryland	Democratic	1771–1834
Ephraim King Wilson II	1873–1875	Maryland	Democratic	1821–1891
Eugene McLanahan Wilson	1869–1871	Minnesota	Democratic	1833–1890
Francis H. Wilson	1895–1897	New York	Republican	1844–1910
Frank E. Wilson	1899–1905; 1911–1915	New York	Democratic	1857–1935
George H. Wilson	1949–1951	Oklahoma	Democratic	1905–1985
George W. Wilson	1893–1897	Ohio	Republican	1840–1909
Heather Wilson	1998–2009	New Mexico	Republican	1960–present
Henry Wilson	1823-1825	Pennsylvania	Democratic-Republican	1778–1826
Henry Wilson	1825-1826	Pennsylvania	Democratic	1778–1826
Isaac Wilson	1823–1824	New York	Democratic–Republican	1780–1848
James Wilson I	1809–1811	New Hampshire	Federalist	1766–1839
James Wilson	1823-1825	Pennsylvania	Democratic-Republican	1779–1868
James Wilson	1825-1829	Pennsylvania	Democratic	1779–1868
James Wilson II	1847–1850	New Hampshire	Whig	1797–1881
James Wilson	1857–1861	Indiana	Republican	1825–1867
James Wilson	1873–1877; 1883–1885	Iowa	Republican	1835–1920
James Clifton Wilson	1917–1919	Texas	Democratic	1874–1951
James F. Wilson	1861–1869	Iowa	Republican	1828–1895
Jeremiah M. Wilson	1871–1875	Indiana	Republican	1828–1901
John Wilson	1813–1815; 1817–1819	Massachusetts	Federalist	1777–1848
John Wilson	1821–1825	South Carolina	Democratic-Republican	1773–1828
John Wilson	1825–1827	South Carolina	Democratic	1773–1828
John F. Wilson	1899–1901; 1903–1905	Arizona	Democratic	1846–1911
John Henry Wilson	1889–1893	Kentucky	Republican	1846–1923
John Haden Wilson	1919–1921	Pennsylvania	Democratic	1867–1946
John L. Wilson	1889–1895	Washington	Republican	1850–1912
John Thomas Wilson	1867–1873	Ohio	Republican	1811–1891
Joseph Franklin Wilson	1947–1955	Texas	Democratic	1901–1968
Joseph G. Wilson	1873	Oregon	Republican	1826–1873
Nathan Wilson	1808–1809	New York	Democratic–Republican	1758–1834
Riley J. Wilson	1915–1937	Louisiana	Democratic	1871–1946
Robert Patterson Clark Wilson	1889–1893	Missouri	Democratic	1834–1916
Stanyarne Wilson	1895–1901	South Carolina	Democratic	1860–1928
Stephen Fowler Wilson	1865–1869	Pennsylvania	Republican	1821–1897
T. Webber Wilson	1923–1929	Mississippi	Democratic	1893–1948
Thomas Wilson	1811–1813	Virginia	Federalist	1765–1826
Thomas Wilson	1813-1817	Pennsylvania	Democratic-Republican	1772–1824
Thomas Wilson	1887–1889	Minnesota	Democratic	1827–1910
William Wilson	1815–1819	Pennsylvania	Democratic-Republican	N/A
William Wilson	1823–1825	Ohio	Democratic-Republican	1773–1827
William Wilson	1825–1827	Ohio	National Republican	1773–1827
William Bauchop Wilson	1907-1913	Pennsylvania	Democratic	1862–1934
William E. Wilson	1923–1925	Indiana	Democratic	1870–1948
William H. Wilson	1935–1937	Pennsylvania	Republican	1877–1937
William Lyne Wilson	1883–1895	West Virginia	Democratic	1843–1900
William Warfield Wilson	1903–1913; 1915–1921	Illinois	Republican	1868–1942
Edwin B. Winans	1883–1887	Michigan	Democratic	1826–1894
James J. Winans	1869–1871	Ohio	Republican	1818–1879
John Winans	1883–1885	Wisconsin	Democratic	1831–1907
Boyd Winchester	1869–1873	Kentucky	Democratic	1836–1923
William Windom	1859–1869	Minnesota	Republican	1827–1891
Charles H. Winfield	1863–1867	New York	Democratic	1822–1888
Austin E. Wing	1825–1829; 1831–1833	Michigan	None	1792–1849
Joseph F. Wingate	1827–1831	Maine	National Republican	1786–18??
Paine Wingate	1793–1795	New Hampshire	Pro-Administration	1739–1838
Effiegene Locke Wingo	1930–1933	Arkansas	Democratic	1883–1962
Otis Wingo	1913–1930	Arkansas	Democratic	1877–1930
Larry Winn	1967–1985	Kansas	Republican	1919–2017
Richard Winn	1793–1795	South Carolina	Anti-Administration	1750–1818
Richard Winn	1795–1797; 1803–1813	South Carolina	Democratic-Republican	1750–1818
Thomas E. Winn	1891–1893	Georgia	Democratic	1839–1925
Samuel Winslow	1913–1925	Massachusetts	Republican	1862–1940
Warren Winslow	1855–1861	North Carolina	Democratic	1810–1862
W. Arthur Winstead	1943–1965	Mississippi	Democratic	1904–1995
Joseph Winston	1793–1795	North Carolina	Anti-Administration	1746–1815
Joseph Winston	1803–1807	North Carolina	Democratic-Republican	1746–1815
Charles E. Winter	1923–1929	Wyoming	Republican	1870–1948
Elisha I. Winter	1813–1815	New York	Federalist	1781–1849
Thomas Daniel Winter	1939–1947	Kansas	Republican	1896–1951
Robert Charles Winthrop	1840–1842; 1842–1850	Massachusetts	Whig	1809–1894
Tim Wirth	1975–1987	Colorado	Democratic	1939–present
Bob Wise	1983–2001	West Virginia	Democratic	1948–present
George D. Wise	1881–1890; 1891–1895	Virginia	Democratic	1831–1898
Henry A. Wise	1833–1837	Virginia	Democratic	1806–1876
Henry A. Wise	1837–1843	Virginia	Whig	1806–1876
Henry A. Wise	1843–1844	Virginia	Democratic	1806–1876
James W. Wise	1915–1925	Georgia	Democratic	1868–1925
John Sergeant Wise	1883–1885	Virginia	Readjuster	1846–1913
Morgan Ringland Wise	1879-1883	Pennsylvania	Democratic	1825-1903
Richard Alsop Wise	1898–1899; 1900	Virginia	Republican	1843-1900
John Witcher	1869–1871	West Virginia	Republican	1839-1906
James Witherell	1807–1808	Vermont	Democratic-Republican	1759-1838
Garrett Withers	1952–1953	Kentucky	Democratic	1884-1953
Robert Witherspoon	1809–1811	South Carolina	Democratic-Republican	1767-1837
Samuel Andrew Witherspoon	1911–1915	Mississippi	Democratic	1855-1915
Gardner R. Withrow	1931–1935	Wisconsin	Republican	1892-1964
Gardner R. Withrow	1935–1939	Wisconsin	Progressive	1892-1964
Gardner R. Withrow	1949–1961	Wisconsin	Republican	1892-1964
William H. Witte	1853–1855	Pennsylvania	Democratic	1817-1876
Jesse P. Wolcott	1931–1957	Michigan	Republican	1893–1969
John S. Wold	1969–1971	Wyoming	Republican	1916–2017
Frank Wolf	1981–2015	Virginia	Republican	1939–present
George Wolf	1824-1829	Pennsylvania	Democratic-Republican	1777–1840
Harry Benjamin Wolf	1907–1909	Maryland	Democratic	1880–1944
Leonard G. Wolf	1959–1961	Iowa	Democratic	1925–1970
William P. Wolf	1870–1871	Iowa	Republican	1833–1896
Simeon K. Wolfe	1873–1875	Indiana	Democratic	1824–1888
James Wolfenden	1928-1947	Pennsylvania	Republican	1889–1949
J. Scott Wolff	1923–1925	Missouri	Democratic	1878–1958
Lester L. Wolff	1965–1981	New York	Democratic	1919–2021
Frank Lane Wolford	1883–1887	Kentucky	Democratic	1817–1895
Howard Wolpe	1979–1993	Michigan	Democratic	1939–2011
Charles A. Wolverton	1927–1959	New Jersey	Republican	1880–1969
John M. Wolverton	1925–1927; 1929–1931	West Virginia	Republican	1872–1944
Simon Peter Wolverton	1891-1893	Pennsylvania	Democratic	1837–1910
Antonio Borja Won Pat	1973–1985	Guam	Democratic	1908–1987
Abiel Wood	1813–1815	Massachusetts	Democratic-Republican	1772–1834
Alan Wood Jr.	1875-1877	Pennsylvania	Republican	1834–1902
Amos E. Wood	1849–1850	Ohio	Democratic	1810–1850
Benjamin Wood	1861–1865; 1881–1883	New York	Democratic	1820–1900
Benson Wood	1895–1897	Illinois	Republican	1839–1915
Bradford R. Wood	1845–1847	New York	Democratic	1800–1889
Ernest E. Wood	1905–1906	Missouri	Democratic	1875–1952
Fernando Wood	1841–1843; 1863–1865; 1867–1881	New York	Democratic	1812–1881
Ira W. Wood	1904–1913	New Jersey	Republican	1856–1931
John Wood	1859–1861	Pennsylvania	Republican	1816–1898
John J. Wood	1827–1829	New York	Democratic	1784–1874
John M. Wood	1855–1859	Maine	Republican	1813–1864
John Stephens Wood	1931–1935; 1945–1953	Georgia	Democratic	1885–1968
John Travers Wood	1951–1953	Idaho	Republican	1878–1954
Reuben T. Wood	1933–1941	Missouri	Democratic	1884–1955
Silas Wood	1819–1825	New York	Democratic–Republican	1769–1847
Silas Wood	1825–1829	New York	National Republican	1769–1847
Thomas Jefferson Wood	1883–1885	Indiana	Democratic	1844–1908
Walter A. Wood	1879–1883	New York	Republican	1815–1892
William R. Wood	1915–1933	Indiana	Republican	1861–1933
Rob Woodall	2011–2021	Georgia	Republican	1970–present
Frederick Augustus Woodard	1893–1897	North Carolina	Democratic	1854–1915
Frederick E. Woodbridge	1863–1869	Vermont	Republican	1818–1888
William Woodbridge	1819–1820	Michigan	Whig	1780–1861
William Woodburn	1875–1877; 1885–1889	Nevada	Republican	1838–1915
David Woodcock	1821–1823	New York	Democratic–Republican	1785–1835
David Woodcock	1827–1829	New York	National Republican	1785–1835
Stewart L. Woodford	1873–1874	New York	Republican	1835–1913
Chase G. Woodhouse	1945–1947; 1949–1951	Connecticut	Democratic	1890–1984
Charles W. Woodman	1895–1897	Illinois	Republican	1844–1898
George Catlin Woodruff	1861–1863	Connecticut	Democratic	1805–1885
John Woodruff	1855–1857	Connecticut	American	1826–1868
John Woodruff	1859–1861	Connecticut	Republican	1826–1868
Roy O. Woodruff	1913–1915	Michigan	Progressive	1876–1953
Roy O. Woodruff	1921–1953	Michigan	Republican	1876–1953
Thomas M. Woodruff	1845–1847	New York	American	1804–1855
Clifton A. Woodrum	1923–1945	Virginia	Democratic	1887–1950
Frank P. Woods	1909–1919	Iowa	Republican	1868–1944
Henry Woods	1799–1803	Pennsylvania	Federalist	1764–1826
James P. Woods	1919–1923	Virginia	Democratic	1868–1948
John Woods	1815–1816	Pennsylvania	Federalist	1761–1816
John Woods	1825–1829	Ohio	National Republican	1794–1855
Samuel D. Woods	1900–1903	California	Republican	1845–1915
William Woods	1823–1825	New York	National Republican	1790–1837
Samuel H. Woodson	1821–1823	Kentucky	Democratic-Republican	1777–1827
Samuel H. Woodson	1857–1861	Missouri	American	1815–1881
George Washington Woodward	1867–1871	Pennsylvania	Democratic	1809–1875
Gilbert M. Woodward	1883–1885	Wisconsin	Democratic	1835–1913
Joseph A. Woodward	1843–1853	South Carolina	Democratic	1806–1885
William Woodward	1815–1817	South Carolina	Democratic-Republican	N/A
James H. Woodworth	1855–1857	Illinois	Republican	1804–1869
Laurin D. Woodworth	1873–1877	Ohio	Republican	1837–1897
William W. Woodworth	1845–1847	New York	Democratic	1807–1873
Harry C. Woodyard	1903–1911; 1916–1923; 1925–1927	West Virginia	Republican	1867–1929
Lynn Woolsey	1993–2013	California	Democratic	1937–present
Ephraim Milton Woomer	1893–1897	Pennsylvania	Republican	1844–1897
Dudley G. Wooten	1901–1903	Texas	Democratic	1860–1929
Samuel T. Worcester	1861–1863	Ohio	Republican	1804–1882
Thomas J. Word	1838–1839	Mississippi	Whig	1805–1890
Eugene Worley	1941–1950	Texas	Democratic	1908–1974
Ludwig Worman	1821–1822	Pennsylvania	Federalist	1761–1822
Jacob R. Wortendyke	1857–1859	New Jersey	Democratic	1818–1868
Henry G. Worthington	1864–1865	Nevada	Republican	1828–1909
John Tolley Hood Worthington	1831–1833; 1837–1841	Maryland	Democratic	1788–1849
Nicholas E. Worthington	1883–1887	Illinois	Democratic	1836–1916
Thomas Contee Worthington	1825–1827	Maryland	National Republican	1782–1847
George C. Wortley	1981–1989	New York	Republican	1926–2014
Thomas Wren	1877–1879	Nevada	Republican	1826–1904
Ashley B. Wright	1893–1897	Massachusetts	Republican	1841–1897
Augustus Romaldus Wright	1857–1859	Georgia	Democratic	1813–1891
Charles Frederick Wright	1899–1905	Pennsylvania	Republican	1856–1925
Daniel B. Wright	1853–1857	Mississippi	Democratic	1812–1887
Edwin R. V. Wright	1865–1867	New Jersey	Democratic	1812–1871
George W. Wright	1850–1851	California	Independent	1816–1885
Hendrick Bradley Wright	1853–1855; 1861–1863; 1877–1879	Pennsylvania	Democratic	1808–1881
Hendrick Bradley Wright	1879–1881	Pennsylvania	Greenbacker	1808–1881
James A. Wright	1941–1945	Pennsylvania	Democratic	1902–1963
Jim Wright	1955–1989	Texas	Democratic	1922–2015
John C. Wright	1823–1825	Ohio	Democratic-Republican	1783–1861
John C. Wright	1825–1829	Ohio	National Republican	1783–1861
John Vines Wright	1855–1861	Tennessee	Democratic	1828–1908
Joseph A. Wright	1843–1845	Indiana	Democratic	1810–1867
Myron Benjamin Wright	1889–1894	Pennsylvania	Republican	1847–1894
Robert Wright	1810–1817; 1821–1823	Maryland	Democratic-Republican	1752–1826
Ron Wright	2019–2021	Texas	Republican	1953–2021
Samuel G. Wright	1845	New Jersey	Whig	1781–1845
Silas Wright	1827–1829	New York	Democratic	1795–1847
William Wright	1843–1847	New Jersey	Whig	1794–1866
William C. Wright	1918–1933	Georgia	Democratic	1866–1933
David Wu	1999–2011	Oregon	Democratic	1955–present
John Wurts	1825–1827	Pennsylvania	Democratic	1792–1861
Harry M. Wurzbach	1921–1929; 1930–1931	Texas	Republican	1874–1931
Adam Martin Wyant	1921–1933	Pennsylvania	Republican	1869–1935
Joseph P. Wyatt Jr.	1979–1981	Texas	Democratic	1941–2022
Wendell Wyatt	1964–1975	Oregon	Republican	1917–2009
Ron Wyden	1981–1996	Oregon	Democratic	1949–present
John W. Wydler	1963–1981	New York	Republican	1924–1987
Chalmers Wylie	1967–1993	Ohio	Republican	1920–1998
Louis C. Wyman	1963–1965; 1967–1974	New Hampshire	Republican	1917–2002
Henry Wynkoop	1789–1791	Pennsylvania	Pro-Administration	1737–1816
Albert Wynn	1993–2008	Maryland	Democratic	1951–present
William J. Wynn	1903–1905	California	Democratic	1860–1935
Thomas Wynns	1802–1807	North Carolina	Democratic-Republican	1764–1825
