= United States House Committee on Merchant Marine and Fisheries =

The United States House Committee on Merchant Marine and Fisheries is a defunct committee of the U.S. House of Representatives.

The Committee on Merchant Marine and Fisheries was created on December 21, 1887, replacing the Select Committee on American Shipbuilding and Shipowning Interests. The House Rules defined its jurisdiction as those matters concerning the United States Merchant Marine. This included all matters relating to transportation by water, the United States Coast Guard, life-saving service, lighthouses, lightships, ocean derelicts, the Coast and Geodetic Survey, the Panama Canal, and fisheries. Legislation referred to the committee also included matters involving seamen (their assignments, wages, treatment, and health) and officers (their titles, conduct, and licensing); the naming, measuring, licensing, and registering of vessels; navigation and related laws; pleasure yachts; collisions at sea, as well as international arrangements to prevent them; coasting districts; maritime schools; and, taxes, fines, and penalties on vessels. The committee has also regulated shipping in the Philippines and Hawaii. As did most committees of the House, the Merchant Marine and Fisheries Committee created subcommittees to handle portions of its jurisdiction.

In 1919 the committee was given jurisdiction over wireless telegraphy and in 1932 its name was changed to the Committee on Merchant Marine, Radio, and Fisheries. After a dispute with the Committee on Interstate and Foreign Commerce, the jurisdiction over radio services was transferred to that committee in 1935 and the term "radio" was dropped from the name of the Merchant Marine and Fisheries Committee.

During his tenure in office, Congressman Mario Biaggi was Chairman of the US House Committee on Merchant Marine and Fisheries Subcommittee on Coast Guard and Navigation.

In 1995, most duties of the committee were transferred to the Committee on Resources and subsequently abolished.

== Chairmen ==
Chair	Party	State	Start of Service	End of Service
Poindexter Dunn	Democratic	Arkansas	1887	1889
John M. Farquhar	Republican	New York	1889	1891
Samuel Fowler	Democratic	New Jersey	1891	1893
George W. Fithian	Democratic	Illinois	1893	1895
Sereno E. Payne	Republican	New York	1895	1899
Charles H. Grosvenor	Republican	Ohio	1899	1907
William S. Greene	Republican	Massachusetts	1907	1911
Joshua W. Alexander	Democratic	Missouri	1911	1919
William S. Greene	Republican	Massachusetts	1919	1924
Frank D. Scott	Republican	Michigan	1925	1927
Wallace H. White Jr.	Republican	Maine	1927	1931
Ewin L. Davis	Democratic	Tennessee	1931	1933
S. Otis Bland	Democratic	Virginia	1933	1947
Frederick Van Ness Bradley	Republican	Michigan	1947	
Alvin F. Weichel	Republican	Ohio	1947	1949
S. Otis Bland	Democratic	Virginia	1949	1950
Edward J. Hart	Democratic	New Jersey	1950	1953
Alvin F. Weichel	Republican	Ohio	1953	1955
Herbert Covington Bonner	Democratic	North Carolina	1955	1965
Edward Garmatz	Democratic	Maryland	1965	1973
Leonor Sullivan	Democratic	Missouri	1973	1977
John M. Murphy	Democratic	New York	1977	1980
Thomas W. L. Ashley	Democratic	Ohio	1980	1981
Walter B. Jones Sr.	Democratic	North Carolina	1981	1992
Gerry Studds	Democratic	Massachusetts	1992	1995
