= Ohio's 13th congressional district =

U.S. House district for Ohio

Coordinates: 41°08′59″N 80°58′43″W

- Interactive map of district boundaries
- Representative: Emilia Sykes; D–Akron
- Population (2025): 781,427
- Median household income: $74,285
- Ethnicity: 75.7% White; 13.0% Black; 4.9% Two or more races; 3.2% Asian; 2.7% Hispanic; 0.6% other
- Cook PVI: EVEN

The 13th congressional district of Ohio is represented by Representative Emilia Sykes. Due to reapportionment following the 2010 United States census, Ohio lost its 17th and 18th congressional districts, necessitating redrawing of district lines. Following the 2012 elections, the 13th district changed to take in much of the territory in the former 17th district, including the city of Youngstown and areas east of Akron.

It was one of several districts challenged in a 2018 lawsuit seeking to overturn Ohio's congressional map as an unconstitutional gerrymander. According to the lawsuit, at that time the 13th resembled a "jigsaw puzzle piece" that reached out to grab the portion of Akron not taken in by the Cleveland-based 11th district.

From 2003 to 2013, the district ran from Lorain to include part of Akron, also taking in the suburban areas in between.

In the 2020 redistricting cycle, Ohio lost its 16th congressional district and this district was redrawn to include all of Summit County and parts of Stark and Portage County including Canton, North Canton and parts of Massillon, while Youngstown was removed from the district.

== Composition ==
For the 118th and successive Congresses (based on redistricting following the 2020 census), the district contains all or portions of the following counties, townships, and municipalities:

Portage County (2)

Mogadore (shared with Summit County), Suffield Township (part; also 14th)

Stark County (14)

Canal Fulton, Canton, Canton Township (part; also 6th), Hartville, Hills and Dales, Jackson Township, Lake Township, Lawrence Township, Massillon (part; also 6th), Meyers Lake, North Canton, Perry Township (part; also 6th), Plain Township, Tuscarawas Township

Summit County (31)

All 31 townships and municipalities

== Recent election results from statewide races ==
=== 2023–2027 boundaries ===
Year	Office	Results
2008	President	Obama 56% - 42%
2012	President	Obama 56% - 44%
2016	President	Clinton 49% - 47%
2016	Senate	Portman 52% - 42%
2018	Senate	Brown 58% - 42%
2018	Governor	Cordray 52% - 45%
2018	Attorney General	Dettelbach 54% - 46%
2020	President	Biden 51% - 48%
2022	Senate	Ryan 53% - 47%
2022	Governor	DeWine 57% - 43%
2022	Secretary of State	LaRose 55% - 44%
2022	Treasurer	Sprague 53% - 47%
2022	Auditor	Faber 53% - 47%
2022	Attorney General	Yost 55% - 45%
2024	President	Harris 49.6% - 49.5%
2024	Senate	Brown 52% - 44%

=== 2027–2033 boundaries ===
Year	Office	Results
2008	President	Obama 57% - 41%
2012	President	Obama 57% - 43%
2016	President	Clinton 50% - 45%
2016	Senate	Portman 51% - 44%
2018	Senate	Brown 59% - 41%
2018	Governor	Cordray 54% - 43%
2018	Attorney General	Dettelbach 55% - 45%
2020	President	Biden 52% - 46%
2022	Senate	Ryan 55% - 44%
2022	Governor	DeWine 55% - 45%
2022	Secretary of State	LaRose 53% - 46%
2022	Treasurer	Sprague 51% - 49%
2022	Auditor	Faber 51% - 49%
2022	Attorney General	Yost 53% - 47%
2024	President	Harris 51% - 48%
2024	Senate	Brown 54% - 43%

== List of members representing the district ==
Member	Party	Year(s)	Cong ress	Electoral history	Counties represented
District established March 4, 1823
Elisha Whittlesey (Canfield)	Democratic-Republican	March 4, 1823 – March 3, 1825	18th 19th 20th 21st 22nd	Elected in 1822. Re-elected in 1824. Re-elected in 1826. Re-elected in 1828. Re-elected in 1830. Redistricted to the 16th district.	
Elisha Whittlesey (Canfield)	Anti-Jacksonian	March 4, 1825 – March 3, 1833	18th 19th 20th 21st 22nd	Elected in 1822. Re-elected in 1824. Re-elected in 1826. Re-elected in 1828. Re-elected in 1830. Redistricted to the 16th district.	
David Spangler (Coshocton)	Anti-Jacksonian	March 4, 1833 – March 3, 1837	23rd 24th	Elected in 1832. Re-elected in 1834. [data missing]	
Daniel Parkhurst Leadbetter (Millersburg)	Democratic	March 4, 1837 – March 3, 1841	25th 26th	Elected in 1836. Re-elected in 1838. [data missing]	
James Mathews (Coshocton)	Democratic	March 4, 1841 – March 3, 1843	27th	Elected in 1840. Redistricted to the 16th district.	
Perley B. Johnson (McConnellsville)	Whig	March 4, 1843 – March 3, 1845	28th	Elected in 1843. [data missing]	
Isaac Parrish (Cambridge)	Democratic	March 4, 1845 – March 3, 1847	29th	Elected in 1844. [data missing]	
Thomas Ritchey (Somerset)	Democratic	March 4, 1847 – March 3, 1849	30th	Elected in 1846. [data missing]	
William A. Whittlesey (Marietta)	Democratic	March 4, 1849 – March 3, 1851	31st	Elected in 1848. [data missing]	
James M. Gaylord (McConnellsville)	Democratic	March 4, 1851 – March 3, 1853	32nd	Elected in 1850. [data missing]	
William D. Lindsley (Sandusky)	Democratic	March 4, 1853 – March 3, 1855	33rd	Elected in 1852. [data missing]	
John Sherman (Mansfield)	Anti-Nebraska	March 4, 1855 – March 3, 1857	34th 35th 36th 37th	Elected in 1854. Re-elected in 1856. Re-elected in 1858. Re-elected in 1860. Resigned when elected U.S. Senator.	
John Sherman (Mansfield)	Republican	March 4, 1857 – March 21, 1861	34th 35th 36th 37th	Elected in 1854. Re-elected in 1856. Re-elected in 1858. Re-elected in 1860. Resigned when elected U.S. Senator.	
Vacant		March 21, 1861 – July 4, 1861	37th		
Samuel T. Worcester (Norwalk)	Republican	July 4, 1861 – March 3, 1863	37th	Elected to finish Sherman's term. [data missing]	
John O'Neill (Zanesville)	Democratic	March 4, 1863 – March 3, 1865	38th	Elected in 1862. [data missing]	
Columbus Delano (Mount Vernon)	Republican	March 4, 1865 – March 3, 1867	39th	Elected in 1864. [data missing]	
George W. Morgan (Mount Vernon)	Democratic	March 4, 1867 – June 3, 1868	40th	Lost contested election.	
Columbus Delano (Mount Vernon)	Republican	June 3, 1868 – March 3, 1869	40th	Won contested election. [data missing]	
George W. Morgan (Mount Vernon)	Democratic	March 4, 1869 – March 3, 1873	41st 42nd	Elected in 1868. Re-elected in 1870. Redistricted to the 9th district and lost re-election there.	
Milton I. Southard (Zanesville)	Democratic	March 4, 1873 – March 3, 1879	43rd 44th 45th	Elected in 1872. Re-elected in 1874. Re-elected in 1876. [data missing]	
Adoniram J. Warner (Marietta)	Democratic	March 4, 1879 – March 3, 1881	46th	Elected in 1878. [data missing]	
Gibson Atherton (Newark)	Democratic	March 4, 1881 – March 3, 1883	47th	Redistricted from the 14th district and re-elected in 1880. [data missing]	
George L. Converse (Columbus)	Democratic	March 4, 1883 – March 3, 1885	48th	Redistricted from the 12th district and re-elected in 1882. [data missing]	
Joseph H. Outhwaite (Columbus)	Democratic	March 4, 1885 – March 3, 1891	49th 50th 51st	Elected in 1884. Re-elected in 1886. Re-elected in 1888. Redistricted to the 9th district.	
James I. Dungan (Jackson)	Democratic	March 4, 1891 – March 3, 1893	52nd	Elected in 1890. [data missing]	
Darius D. Hare (Upper Sandusky)	Democratic	March 4, 1893 – March 3, 1895	53rd	Redistricted from the 8th district and re-elected in 1892. [data missing]	
Stephen Ross Harris (Bucyrus)	Republican	March 4, 1895 – March 3, 1897	54th	Elected in 1894. [data missing]	
James A. Norton (Tiffin)	Democratic	March 4, 1897 – March 3, 1903	55th 56th 57th	Elected in 1896. Re-elected in 1898. Re-elected in 1900. [data missing]	
Amos H. Jackson (Fremont)	Republican	March 4, 1903 – March 3, 1905	58th	Elected in 1902. [data missing]	
Grant E. Mouser (Marion)	Republican	March 4, 1905 – March 3, 1909	59th 60th	Elected in 1904. Re-elected in 1906. [data missing]	
Carl C. Anderson (Fostoria)	Democratic	March 4, 1909 – October 1, 1912	61st 62nd	Elected in 1908. Re-elected in 1910. Died.	
Vacant		October 1, 1912 – March 3, 1913	62nd		
John A. Key (Marion)	Democratic	March 4, 1913 – March 3, 1915	63rd	Elected in 1912. Redistricted to the 8th district.	
Arthur W. Overmyer (Fremont)	Democratic	March 4, 1915 – March 3, 1919	64th 65th	Elected in 1914. Re-elected in 1916. [data missing]	
James T. Begg (Sandusky)	Republican	March 4, 1919 – March 3, 1929	66th 67th 68th 69th 70th	Elected in 1918. Re-elected in 1920. Re-elected in 1922. Re-elected in 1924. Re-elected in 1926. [data missing]	
Joseph E. Baird (Bowling Green)	Republican	March 4, 1929 – March 3, 1931	71st	Elected in 1928. [data missing]	
William L. Fiesinger (Sandusky)	Democratic	March 4, 1931 – January 3, 1937	72nd 73rd 74th	Elected in 1930. Re-elected in 1932. Re-elected in 1934. [data missing]	
Dudley A. White (Norwalk)	Republican	January 3, 1937 – January 3, 1941	75th 76th	Elected in 1936. Re-elected in 1938. [data missing]	
Albert David Baumhart Jr. (Vermilion)	Republican	January 3, 1941 – September 2, 1942	77th	Elected in 1940. Resigned after receiving a commission in the United States Navy	
Vacant		September 2, 1942 – January 3, 1943	77th		
Alvin F. Weichel (Sandusky)	Republican	January 3, 1943 – January 3, 1955	78th 79th 80th 81st 82nd 83rd	Elected in 1942. Re-elected in 1944. Re-elected in 1946. Re-elected in 1948. Re-elected in 1950. Re-elected in 1952. Retired.	
Albert David Baumhart Jr. (Vermilion)	Republican	January 3, 1955 – January 3, 1961	84th 85th 86th	Elected in 1954. Re-elected in 1956. Re-elected in 1958. Retired.	
Charles Adams Mosher (Oberlin)	Republican	January 3, 1961 – January 3, 1977	87th 88th 89th 90th 91st 92nd 93rd 94th	Elected in 1960. Re-elected in 1962. Re-elected in 1964. Re-elected in 1966. Re-elected in 1968. Re-elected in 1970. Re-elected in 1972. Re-elected in 1974. Retired.	
Don Pease (Oberlin)	Democratic	January 3, 1977 – January 3, 1993	95th 96th 97th 98th 99th 100th 101st 102nd	Elected in 1976. Re-elected in 1978. Re-elected in 1980. Re-elected in 1982. Re-elected in 1984. Re-elected in 1986. Re-elected in 1988. Re-elected in 1990. Retired.	
Sherrod Brown (Lorain)	Democratic	January 3, 1993 – January 3, 2007	103rd 104th 105th 106th 107th 108th 109th	Elected in 1992. Re-elected in 1994. Re-elected in 1996. Re-elected in 1998. Re-elected in 2000. Re-elected in 2002. Re-elected in 2004. Retired to run for U.S. Senator.	
Sherrod Brown (Lorain)	Democratic	January 3, 1993 – January 3, 2007	103rd 104th 105th 106th 107th 108th 109th	Elected in 1992. Re-elected in 1994. Re-elected in 1996. Re-elected in 1998. Re-elected in 2000. Re-elected in 2002. Re-elected in 2004. Retired to run for U.S. Senator.	2003–2013
Betty Sutton (Copley)	Democratic	January 3, 2007 – January 3, 2013	110th 111th 112th	Elected in 2006. Re-elected in 2008. Re-elected in 2010. Redistricted to the 16th district and lost re-election there.	2003–2013
Tim Ryan (Warren)	Democratic	January 3, 2013 – January 3, 2023	113th 114th 115th 116th 117th	Redistricted from the 17th district and re-elected in 2012. Re-elected in 2014. Re-elected in 2016. Re-elected in 2018. Re-elected in 2020. Retired to run for U.S. Senator.	2013–2023
Emilia Sykes (Akron)	Democratic	January 3, 2023 – present	118th 119th	Elected in 2022. Re-elected in 2024. Re-elected in 2026.	2023–2027

== Recent election results ==
The following chart shows historic election results since 1920.

Year	Democratic	Republican	Other
1920	Alfred Waggoner: 26,646	✓ James T. Begg (Incumbent): 48,416	
1922	Arthur W. Overmyer: 30,199	✓ James T. Begg (Incumbent): 38,994	
1924	John Dreitzler: 27,623	✓ James T. Begg (Incumbent): 45,307	
1926	G. C. Steineman: 19,571	✓ James T. Begg (Incumbent): 36,444	
1928	William C. Martin: 34,015	✓ Joe E. Baird: 54,174	
1930	✓ William L. Fiesinger: 35,199	Joe E. Baird (Incumbent): 35,199	
1932	✓ William L. Fiesinger (Incumbent): 56,070	Walter E. Kruger: 39,122	
1934	✓ William L. Fiesinger (Incumbent): 43,617	Walter E. Kruger: 35,889	Charles C. Few: 764
1936	Forrest R. Black: 39,042	✓ Dudley A. White: 46,623	Merrell E. Martin: 12,959
1938	William L. Fiesinger: 24,749	✓ Dudley A. White (Incumbent): 56,204	
1940	Werner S. Haslinger: 40,274	✓ A. David Baumhart Jr.: 62,442	
1942	E. C. Alexander: 23,618	✓ Alvin F. Weichel: 37,923	
1944		✓ Alvin F. Weichel (Incumbent): 67,298	
1946	Frank W. Thomas: 19,237	✓ Alvin F. Weichel (Incumbent): 49,725	
1948	Dwight A. Blackmore: 38,264	✓ Alvin F. Weichel (Incumbent): 55,408	
1950	Dwight A. Blackmore: 24,042	✓ Alvin F. Weichel (Incumbent): 58,484	
1952	George C. Steinemann: 44,467	✓ Alvin F. Weichel (Incumbent): 63,344	
1954	George C. Steinemann: 32,177	✓ A. David Baumhart Jr.: 56,524	
1956	J. P. Henderson: 32,900	✓ A. David Baumhart Jr. (Incumbent): 79,324	
1958	J. William McCray: 45,390	✓ A. David Baumhart Jr. (Incumbent): 65,169	
1960	J. William McCray: 69,033	✓ Charles A. Mosher: 73,100	
1962	J. Grant Keys: 52,030	✓ Charles A. Mosher (Incumbent): 63,858	
1964	Louis Frey: 62,780	✓ Charles A. Mosher (Incumbent): 75,945	
1966	Thomas E. Wolfe: 36,751	✓ Charles A. Mosher (Incumbent): 69,862	
1968	Adrian F. Betleski: 59,864	✓ Charles A. Mosher (Incumbent): 97,158	
1970	Joseph J. Bartolomeo: 53,271	✓ Charles A. Mosher (Incumbent): 85,858	
1972	John M. Ryan: 51,991	✓ Charles A. Mosher (Incumbent): 111,242	
1974	Fred M. Ritenauer: 53,766	✓ Charles A. Mosher (Incumbent): 72,881	
1976	✓ Don Pease: 108,061	Woodrow W. Mathna: 49,828	Patricia A. Cortez: 5,794
1978	✓ Don Pease (Incumbent): 80,875	Mark W. Whitfield: 43,269	
1980	✓ Don Pease (Incumbent): 113,439	David Earl Armstrong: 64,296	
1982	✓ Don Pease (Incumbent): 92,296	Timothy Paul Martin: 53,376	James S. Patton: 5,053
1984	✓ Don Pease (Incumbent): 131,923	William G. Schaffner: 59,610	Other: 7,223
1986	✓ Don Pease (Incumbent): 88,612	William D. Nielsen Jr.: 52,452	
1988	✓ Don Pease (Incumbent): 137,074	Dwight Brown: 59,287	
1990	✓ Don Pease (Incumbent): 93,431	William D. Nielsen Jr.: 60,925	John Michael Ryan: 10,506
1992	✓ Sherrod Brown: 134,486	Margaret R. Mueller: 88,889	Mark Miller: 20,320; Tom Lawson: 4,719; Werner J. Lange: 3,844
1994	✓ Sherrod Brown (Incumbent): 93,147	Gregory A. White: 86,422	Howard Mason: 7,777; John Michael Ryan: 2,430
1996	✓ Sherrod Brown (Incumbent): 148,690	Kenneth C. Blair Jr.: 87,108	David C. Kluter (N): 8,707
1998	✓ Sherrod Brown (Incumbent): 116,309	Grace L. Drake: 72,666	
2000	✓ Sherrod Brown (Incumbent): 170,058	Rick H. Jeric: 84,295	Michael A. Chmura (L): 5,837; David C. Kluter (N): 3,108
2002	✓ Sherrod Brown (Incumbent): 123,025	Ed Oliveros: 55,357	
2004	✓ Sherrod Brown (Incumbent): 196,139	Robert Lucas: 95,025	
2006	✓ Betty Sutton: 135,639	Craig L. Foltin: 85,922	
2008	✓ Betty Sutton (Incumbent): 189,542	David Potter: 104,066	Robert Crow: 37
2010	✓ Betty Sutton (Incumbent): 118,806	Tom Ganley: 94,367	
2012	✓ Tim Ryan: 235,492	Marisha Agana: 88,120	
2014	✓ Tim Ryan (Incumbent): 120,230	Thomas Pekarek: 55,233	David Allen Pastorius (write-in): 86
2016	✓ Tim Ryan (Incumbent): 208,610	Richard A. Morckel: 99,377	Calvin Hill Sr. (write-in): 17
2018	✓ Tim Ryan (Incumbent): 153,323	Chris DePizzo: 98,047	
2020	✓ Tim Ryan (Incumbent): 173,631	Christina Hagan: 148,648	Michael Fricke: 8,522
2022	✓ Emilia Sykes: 149,816	Madison Gesiotto Gilbert: 134,593	
2024	✓ Emilia Sykes (Incumbent): 197,466	Kevin Coughlin: 188,924	

== See also ==
- Ohio's congressional districts
- List of United States congressional districts
