= William D. Lindsley =

American politician (1812–1890)

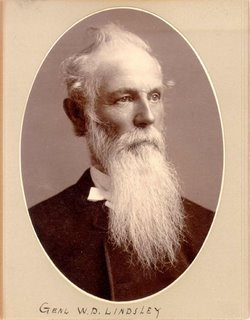

Member of the U.S. House of Representatives from Ohio's 13th district
- In office March 4, 1853 – March 3, 1855
- Preceded by: James M. Gaylord
- Succeeded by: John Sherman

Personal details
- Born: William Dell Lindsley; December 25, 1812 New Haven, Connecticut
- Died: March 11, 1890 (aged 77) Erie County, Ohio
- Resting place: Oakland Cemetery, Sandusky, Ohio
- Party: Democratic

William Dell Lindsley (December 25, 1812 – March 11, 1890) was a 19th-century American military veteran and politician who served one-term as a U.S. representative from Ohio from 1853 to 1855.

== Biography ==
Born in New Haven, Connecticut, Lindsley attended the common schools. He moved to Buffalo, New York, in 1832 and soon after to Erie County, Ohio, settling near Sandusky. He engaged in agricultural pursuits. He served as captain in the Ohio Militia from 1840 to 1843 and as brigadier general in 1843.

=== Congress ===
Lindsley was elected as a Democrat to the Thirty-third Congress (March 4, 1853 – March 3, 1855). He was an unsuccessful candidate for reelection in 1854 to the Thirty-fourth Congress. He resumed agricultural pursuits.

=== Death ===
He died in Perkins Township, Ohio, March 11, 1890. He was interred in Oakland Cemetery, Sandusky, Ohio.

== Sources ==
- United States Congress. "William D. Lindsley (id: L000330)". Biographical Directory of the United States Congress.

U.S. House of Representatives
| Preceded by James M. Gaylord | Member of the U.S. House of Representatives from Ohio's 13th congressional district 1853–1855 | Succeeded by John Sherman |
