= Henry Aiken Worcester =

Henry Aiken Worcester (Sept. 25, 1802 – May 21, 1841) was a Yale University alumnus, a vegetarian, and a Swedenborgian minister who worked in Maine and Massachusetts. His "Sermons on the Lord's Prayer" was published posthumously in 1850 .

== Biography ==
He was born in Hollis, New Hampshire to the large Worcester family. His siblings included Congressman Samuel T. Worcester and David Worcester, who was principal of Bangor High School. He graduated Yale University, class of 1828. He studied at Yale Divinity School from 1829-1830.

He married Olive Gay of Gardiner on August 26, 1838, and they had two children, Henry Parker Worcester and Mary Olivia Worcester, who was born after her father died. His obituary said: "Mr. Worcester's amiable, frank and social qualities gained him many warm friends, and his character and acquirements were such as to ensure to him universal esteem."

== Ministry ==
He was licensed to preach April 12, 1833. Worcester held ministerial positions at Swedenborgian churches in Abington, Massachusetts, Bath, Maine, Gardiner, Maine and Portland. Maine. He moved to Portland in 1833. He published The Sabbath in 1841.

== Vegetarian diet ==
In 1834 health reformer Sylvester Graham lectured in Portland, Maine on "The Science of Human Life." Rev. Worcester attended and then wrote to his siblings in Hardwick, Vermont about the lectures. In his letter housed in the Ernest Bell Memorial Library, he wrote about Graham's recommendations for a vegetarian diet that was mostly vegan, and he wrote:

I confess myself a convert to his mode of life in theory and now in practice.

Also in the letter Worcester wrote:

But I tell you that the physicians, all but one quack, of Portland, a very scientific class of men, have attended the course, and I believe all, to a man, acknowledge the correctness of Graham’s principles. The change that it is making in this city you can hardly conceive of – for a very large portion of the inhabitants have adopted his mode of diet and manner of living.

Food columnist Avery Yale Kamila wrote in the Portland Press Herald that his report was different from "the assessment in [history book] “Vegetarian America” that most doctors of the day ignored Graham’s dietary advice."

== Selected publications ==
- Sermons on the Lord's Prayer, 1850, Philadelphia
- The Sabbath, 1841, London
- Sermons, 1837
