= James T. Begg =

American educator and politician (1877–1963)

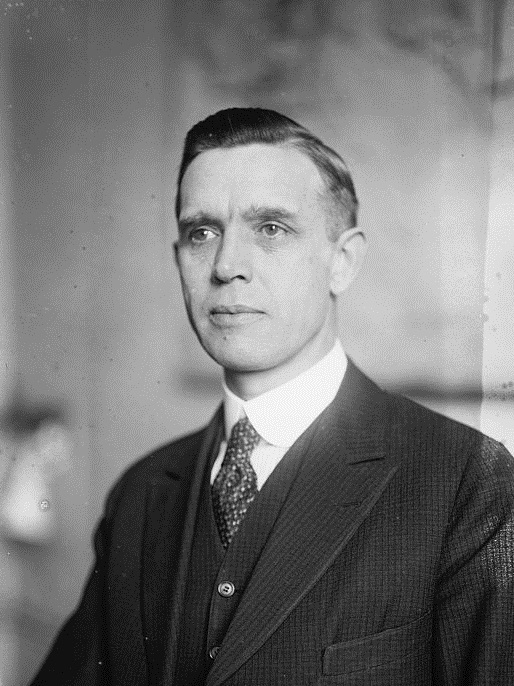
- 1921 or 1922

Member of the U.S. House of Representatives from Ohio's 13th district
- In office March 4, 1919 – March 3, 1929
- Preceded by: Arthur W. Overmyer
- Succeeded by: Joseph E. Baird

Personal details
- Born: James Thomas Begg; February 16, 1877 Lima, Ohio, U.S.
- Died: March 26, 1963 (aged 86) Oklahoma City, Oklahoma, U.S.
- Resting place: Lake View Cemetery, Cleveland, Ohio, U.S.
- Party: Republican
- Education: College of Wooster

James Thomas Begg (February 16, 1877 – March 26, 1963) was an American educator and politician who served five terms as a U.S. representative from Ohio from 1919 to 1929.

== Biography ==
Born on a farm near Lima, Ohio, Begg attended the public and high schools of Columbus Grove, and Lima (Ohio) College. He was graduated from the Wooster (Ohio) University in 1903. He taught school.

=== Early career ===
He was superintendent of public schools at Columbus Grove, Ohio 1905–1910, at Ironton, Ohio from 1910 to 1913, and at Sandusky, Ohio from 1913 to 1917.

He was employed as a campaign director and lectured throughout the United States for the American City Bureau of New York in chamber-of-commerce work from 1917 to 1919.

=== Congress ===
Begg was elected as a Republican to the Sixty-sixth and to the four succeeding Congresses (March 4, 1919 – March 3, 1929). He was not a candidate for renomination in 1928 to the Seventy-first Congress.

He engaged in the banking business and was an unsuccessful candidate for election in 1942 to the Seventy-eighth Congress. He later worked as a business consultant and dairy farmer.

=== Later career and death ===
He moved to Oklahoma City, Oklahoma, in 1959, where he resided until his death on March 26, 1963. He was interred in Garfield-Lakeview Cemetery, Cleveland, Ohio.

== Sources ==
- United States Congress. "James T. Begg (id: B000314)". Biographical Directory of the United States Congress.

U.S. House of Representatives
Preceded by Arthur W. Overmyer	Member of the U.S. House of Representatives from Ohio's 13th congressional district 1919-1929	Succeeded by Joseph E. Baird
