= Joseph E. Baird =

American politician (1865–1942)

Member of the U.S. House of Representatives from Ohio's 13th district
- In office March 4, 1929 – March 3, 1931
- Preceded by: James T. Begg
- Succeeded by: William L. Fiesinger

Personal details
- Born: Joseph Edward Baird; November 12, 1865 Perrysburg, Ohio, U.S.
- Died: June 14, 1942 (aged 76) Bowling Green, Ohio, U.S.
- Resting place: Oak Grove Cemetery
- Party: Republican
- Education: University of Michigan Law School

Joseph Edward Baird (November 12, 1865 – June 14, 1942) was an American politician who served as a member of the U.S. House Of Representatives from Ohio's 13th congressional district from 1929 to 1931.

Born in Perrysburg, Ohio, Baird attended public school and graduated from Perrysburg High School in 1885 and from the law department of the University of Michigan at Ann Arbor in 1893. Though admitted to the bar in 1893, he did not practice. He moved to Bowling Green in 1894 and served as county clerk of Wood County from 1894 to 1900. He later engaged as a dealer in oil and farm lands from 1900 to 1921.

Baird served as mayor of Bowling Green from 1902 to 1905 and as the local postmaster from 1910 to 1914. He was secretary of the Public Utilities Commission of Ohio from 1921 to 1924 and served as assistant secretary of state from 1923 to 1929. Baird was elected as a Republican to the 71st United States Congress. He served for a single term from March 4, 1929, to March 4, 1931, and lost reelection in 1930 to William L. Fiesinger. Thereafter, he retired from active business pursuits and political activities, and died in Bowling Green in 1942. He was interred in Oak Grove Cemetery.

== Electoral history ==
Electoral history of Joseph E. Baird
Year	Office		Party	Votes			Result	Swing	Ref.
Year	Office		Party	Total	%	P.	Result	Swing	Ref.
1928	U.S. House	13th	Republican	54,174	61.43	1st	Won	Hold	
1930	U.S. House	13th	Republican	35,199	48.04	2nd	Lost	Gain	
Source: Clerk of the U.S. House | Election Statistics

== Sources ==
- United States Congress. "Joseph E. Baird (id: B000054)". Biographical Directory of the United States Congress.

U.S. House of Representatives
Preceded by James T. Begg	Member of the U.S. House of Representatives from Ohio's 13th congressional district 1929-1931	Succeeded by William L. Fiesinger
