= William L. Fiesinger =

American politician

William Louis Fiesinger
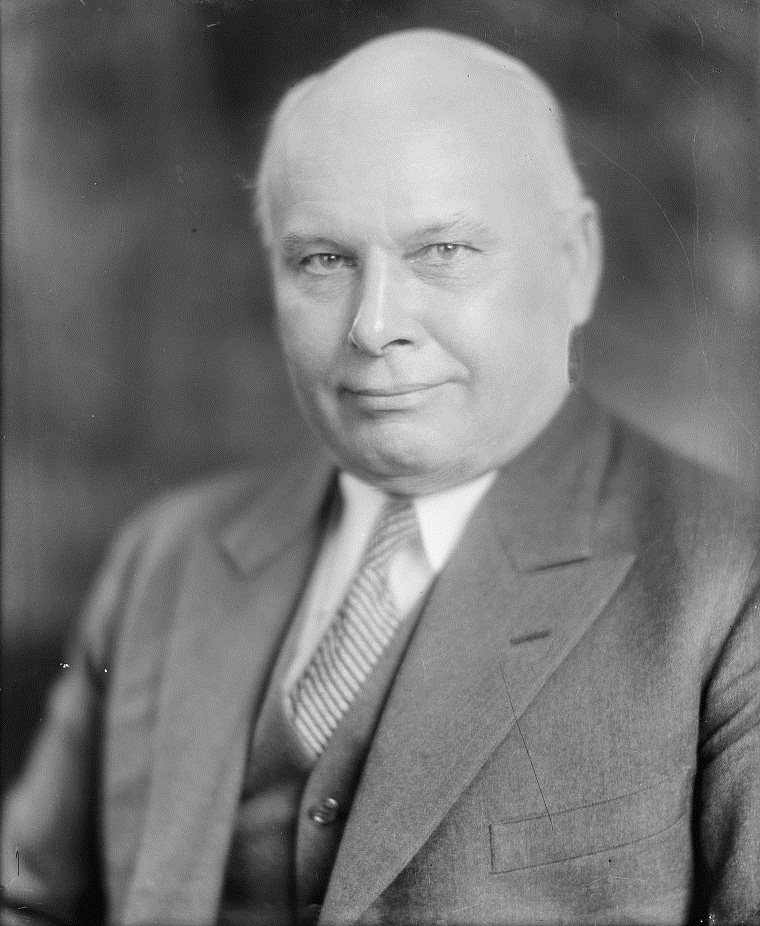

Member of the U.S. House of Representatives from Ohio's 13th district
- In office March 4, 1931 – January 3, 1937
- Preceded by: Joseph E. Baird
- Succeeded by: Dudley A. White

Personal details
- Born: October 25, 1877 Willard, Ohio, U.S.
- Died: September 11, 1953 (aged 75) Cleveland, Ohio, U.S.
- Resting place: Oakland Cemetery, Sandusky, Ohio
- Party: Democratic
- Education: Baldwin-Wallace University

William Louis Fiesinger (October 25, 1877 – September 11, 1953) was an American politician. A Democrat, he served in the United States House of Representatives from 1931-1937 representing Ohio's 13th district.

== Early life ==
Born in Willard, Ohio, Fiesinger was educated in the public schools of Norwalk, Ohio. He graduated from the law department of Baldwin-Wallace University, Berea, Ohio, in 1901.

== Legal career ==
He was admitted to the bar the same year and commenced practice in Sandusky, Ohio. He served as city solicitor of Sandusky 1903-1909. He served as judge of the Common Pleas Court of Erie County 1925-1931.

== Political career ==
Fiesinger was elected as a Democrat to the Seventy-second, Seventy-third, and Seventy-fourth Congresses (March 4, 1931 – January 3, 1937). He was an unsuccessful candidate for renomination in 1936. He resumed the practice of law in Sandusky, Ohio.

He died in Cleveland, Ohio, September 11, 1953. He was interred in Oakland Cemetery, Sandusky, Ohio.

== Sources ==
- United States Congress. "William L. Fiesinger (id: F000114)". Biographical Directory of the United States Congress.

U.S. House of Representatives
Preceded by Joseph E. Baird	Member of the U.S. House of Representatives from Ohio's 13th congressional district 1931-1937	Succeeded by Dudley A. White
