= John L. Greene (Ohio politician) =

American politician and judge (1806–1879)

Judge of the Ohio Court of Common Pleas
- In office 1861–1864
- Preceded by: Samuel T. Worcester

Mayor of Fremont, Ohio
- In office 1858

Member of the Ohio House of Representatives
- In office 1855

Personal details
- Born: July 16, 1806 St. Lawrence County, New York, U.S.
- Died: November 8, 1879 (aged 73) Clark County, Kentucky, U.S.
- Spouse(s): Julia L. Castle (m. 1828) Maria R. DuComb
- Children: 12
- Education: University of Vermont
- Occupation: Politician; judge; lawyer

John L. Greene (July 16, 1806 – November 8, 1879) was a politician, judge and lawyer from Ohio. He served in the Ohio House of Representatives in 1855. He served as mayor of Fremont, Ohio, in 1858. Greene was a judge of the Ohio Courts of Common Pleas from 1861 to 1864.

== Early life ==
John L. Greene was born on July 16, 1806, in St. Lawrence County, New York. In August 1815, Greene moved with his father's family to Newburgh, Ohio. Shortly afterward, Greene moved to Plattsburgh, New York, and spent two years studying law under his uncle John Lynde. He studied at the University of Vermont for a time, but left due to ill health. Greene then moved to Cleveland, Ohio, to teach at an academy while studying the law under Leonard Case. After leaving the academy, he became a bookkeeper at the mercantile house of Irad Kelley.

== Career ==
In 1833, Greene purchased 1,400 acres of land in Sandusky County, Ohio, and moved there with his family in the spring of 1834. Greene had a mercantile business in Scott Township, but it failed during the Panic of 1837.

In 1840, Greene moved to lower Sandusky County to practice law. He practiced law until 1855. In the 1840s, Greene partnered with Brice J. Bartlett and Chester Edgerton. He later partnered with Thomas P. Finefrock. From 1850 to 1852, he was prosecuting attorney. He was elected to the Ohio House of Representatives in 1855. In 1858, Greene was mayor of Fremont, Ohio. In 1861, Greene was elected to the Ohio Courts of Common Pleas in the fourth judicial district of Ohio, to fill the vacancy of Samuel T. Worcester. He remained in that role until February 1864 when his term expired. He then formed a law partnership with his son John L. Greene and continued that until his death.

== Personal life ==
Greene married Julia L. Castle of Cleveland on July 16, 1828. He also married Maria R. DuComb. He had eight sons and four daughters. His son J. B. became a physician in Indiana.

Greene died on November 8, 1879, at the home of his son in Clark County, Kentucky.

== Legacy ==
The village of Greensburg in Scott Township was named after Greene.
