= Charles Mosher =

American politician (1906–1984)

Charles Adams Mosher
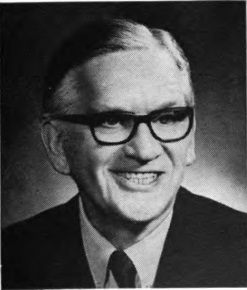

Member of the U.S. House of Representatives from Ohio's 13th district
- In office January 3, 1961 – January 3, 1977
- Preceded by: Albert David Baumhart Jr.
- Succeeded by: Don Pease

Member of the Ohio Senate
- In office 1951-1960

Personal details
- Born: May 7, 1906 Sandwich, Illinois, US
- Died: November 16, 1984 (aged 78) Oberlin, Ohio, US
- Resting place: Westwood Cemetery, Oberlin
- Party: Republican
- Education: Oberlin College

Charles Adams Mosher (May 7, 1906 – November 16, 1984) was an American newspaperman and liberal politician who served eight terms as a Republican member of the United States House of Representatives from Ohio from 1961 to 1977.

== Early life and career ==
Charles Adams Mosher was born in Sandwich, Illinois. He graduated from Sandwich High School, and Oberlin College in 1928. He was employed on daily newspapers in Aurora, Illinois, and Janesville, Wisconsin, from 1929 to 1940. He was president and manager of the Oberlin Printing Company and editor-publisher of the Oberlin News-Tribune, 1940-1961. He was vice chairman of Oberlin City Council, 1945-1951.

=== State legislature ===
He was a member of the Ohio State Senate from 1951 to 1960, a member of Ohio Legislative Service Commission from 1947 to 1959, and vice chairman of the Ohio School Survey Commission from 1954 to 1955. He was a delegate to the White House Conference on Education in 1955, director of the Oberlin Improvement and Development Corporation and a member of Presidential Commission on Marine Science, Engineering and Resources, 1967-1969.

In 1961 he was listed as being on the Committee on Science and Astronautics. Chaired by Overton Brooks, and therefore a contributor to what has now become popularly known as the 'Brookings Report' (1961). The report dealt with the long term implications for American Society of Space Exploration.

== Congress ==
Mosher was elected as a Republican to the Eighty-seventh and to the seven succeeding Congresses. He was not a candidate for re-election in 1976 to the Ninety-fifth Congress. Mosher was a member of the NAACP and the ACLU.

Mosher voted in favor of the Civil Rights Act of 1964, the Voting Rights Act of 1965, the Medicare program for the elderly, the Civil Rights Act of 1968, was one of twenty House Republicans to support the repeal of right-to-work laws, supported the Equal Rights Amendment as well as the Family Assistance Plan and the Comprehensive Child Development Act. Originally a supporter of the Gulf of Tonkin Resolution, he was the first Republican to oppose appropriations for the Vietnam War in 1967 and described his vote in favor of the resolution as his biggest regret. In 1971, Mosher became Ranking Member of the House Science Committee after incumbent Ranking Member James G. Fulton passed away. That same year, Mosher was one of four House Republican co-sponsors of the Health Security Act of 1971 sponsored by Ted Kennedy in the Senate and Martha Griffiths in the House, which would have provided universal health coverage.

In 1974, Mosher expressed support for solar energy as a renewable energy source, noting: "“In fact, the consensus is that there are no major technical barriers to the widespread application of solar energy to meet U.S. energy needs.”

In his last interview as a congressman, Mosher remarked: "Perhaps we are so much more aware of the complexities of the world that it makes us indecisive -- much more so than we were a few years back when we flew by the seat of the pants." Deciding that he'd retire after his last term, Mosher said in 1976: "I am convinced from observing the sad examples of others that it usually is a mistake for anyone in public office to seek re-election after age 70."

== Later career and death ==
In 1977, he was elected to the Common Cause National Governing Board. He was the executive director of the House Science and Technology Committee in Washington, D.C., September 1977 – 1979. He was a fellow of the Woodrow Wilson Center at the Smithsonian Institution in 1980. He received his M.A. from Oberlin College in 1982. He was a resident of Oberlin, Ohio, until his death on November 16, 1984, at the age of 78. With his wife Harriet, he had two children, Frederick and Jane, and six grandchildren. He had two brothers, Edward and Henry.

== Bibliography ==
- Mosher, Charles Adams. Reinterpreting Congress and Its Works; A Speculative Theory Essayed: The Reflections, Confessions and Credo of Charles Adams Mosher. Oberlin, OH: C. A. Mosher, 1984.

== Sources ==
- United States Congress. "Charles Mosher (id: M001031)". Biographical Directory of the United States Congress.
- The Political Graveyard

U.S. House of Representatives
Preceded by Albert David Baumhart Jr.	Member of the U.S. House of Representatives from Ohio's 13th congressional district 1961–1977	Succeeded by Don Pease
Preceded by James G. Fulton	Ranking Member of the House Science Committee; 1971–1977	Succeeded by John W. Wydler
