= Albert David Baumhart Jr. =

American politician

A. David Baumhart Jr.
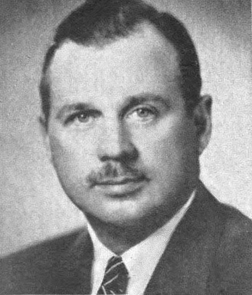

Member of the U.S. House of Representatives from Ohio's 13th district
- In office January 3, 1941 – September 2, 1942
- Preceded by: Dudley A. White
- Succeeded by: Alvin F. Weichel
- In office January 3, 1955 – January 3, 1961
- Preceded by: Alvin F. Weichel
- Succeeded by: Charles Adams Mosher

Member of the Ohio Senate
- In office 1937-1940

Personal details
- Born: June 15, 1908 Vermilion, Ohio, U.S.
- Died: January 23, 2001 (aged 92) Lorain, Ohio, U.S.
- Resting place: Maple Grove Cemetery, Vermillion
- Party: Republican
- Education: Ohio University

Military service
- Allegiance: United States
- Branch/service: United States Navy
- Years of service: 1942-1946
- Rank: lieutenant commander
- Battles/wars: World War II

Albert David Baumhart Jr. (June 15, 1908 – January 23, 2001) was a Republican member of the U.S. House of Representatives from Ohio. He served in Congress from 1941 to 1942, and again from 1955 to 1961.

== Early life ==
Baumhart was born in Vermilion, Ohio. Baumhart's mother died at 35 in 1918 from the Spanish Flu epidemic. He attended Ohio University in Athens, Ohio, receiving his A.B. and M.A. in 1931.

== Political career ==
He was a publishing house representative at Vermilion, Ohio, from 1932 to 1939. He was a member of the Ohio State Senate from 1937 to 1940.

Baumhart was elected as a Republican to the Seventy-seventh Congress. Throughout all of 1940 and most of 1941 he was known as an "interventionist Republican" who advocated that America go to war in Europe against Nazi Germany in order to help the United Kingdom. He resigned to accept a commission in the United States Navy on September 2, 1942. He was discharged as a lieutenant commander on January 17, 1946. He was a member of the public relations staff of Owens-Corning Fiberglass Corp., in Toledo, Ohio, from 1946 to 1953. He served as director of the Republican National Committee in 1953 and 1954.

Baumhart was again elected as a Republican to the Eighty-fourth, Eighty-fifth, and Eighty-sixth Congresses. He was not a candidate for renomination in 1960. Baumhart voted in favor of the Civil Rights Acts of 1957 and 1960. He was a delegate to 1968 Republican National Convention.

== Post-Political career ==
He later worked as public relations consultant.

== Death ==
He died on January 23, 2001, in Lorain, Ohio. He is interred at Maple Grove Cemetery in Vermilion, Ohio.

U.S. House of Representatives
Preceded by Dudley A. White	Member of the U.S. House of Representatives from Ohio's 13th congressional district January 3, 1941 – September 2, 1942	Succeeded by Alvin F. Weichel
Preceded by Alvin F. Weichel	Member of the U.S. House of Representatives from Ohio's 13th congressional district January 3, 1955 – January 3, 1961	Succeeded by Charles A. Mosher
