= Arthur W. Overmyer =

American politician and jurist

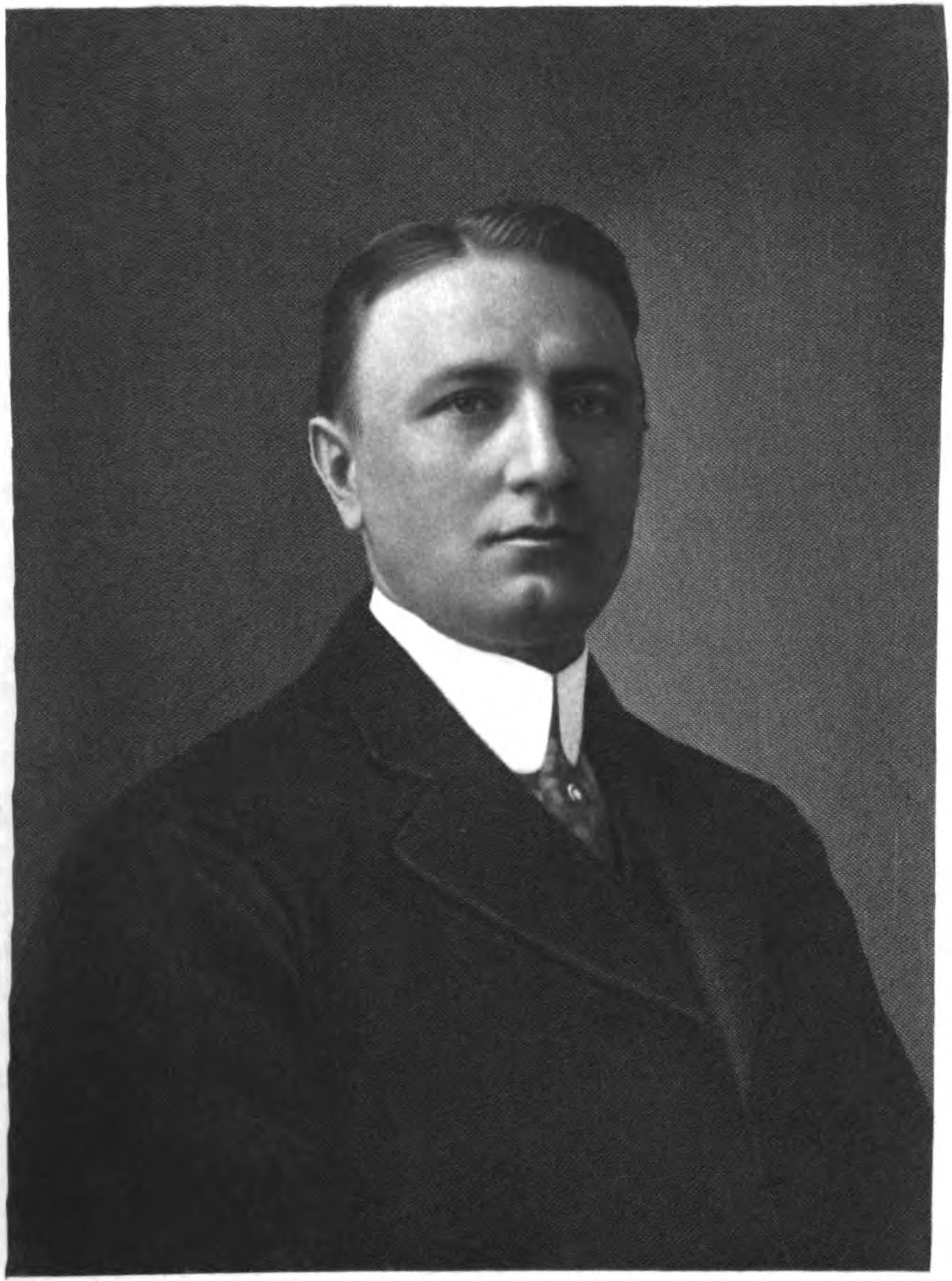

Member of the U.S. House of Representatives from Ohio's 13th district
- In office March 4, 1915 – March 3, 1919
- Preceded by: John A. Key
- Succeeded by: James T. Begg

Personal details
- Born: Arthur Warren Overmyer; May 31, 1879 Lindsey, Ohio, U.S.
- Died: March 8, 1952 (aged 72) North Royalton, Ohio, U.S.
- Resting place: Four-Mile House Cemetery; Fremont, Ohio
- Party: Democratic
- Spouse: Nina Zelden Preston
- Children: One
- Education: Ohio Northern University Pettit College of Law
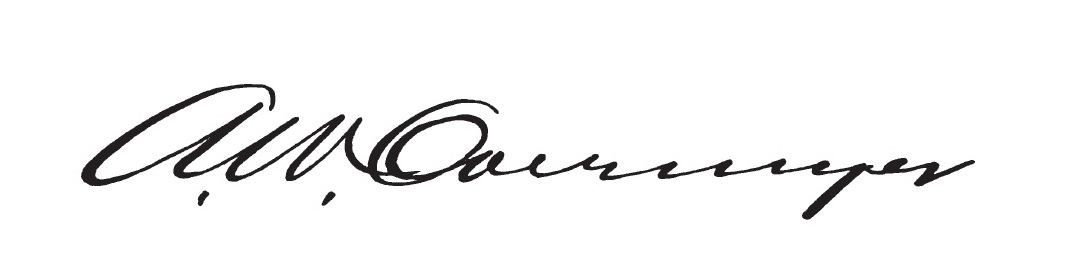
- Signature

Arthur Warren Overmyer (May 31, 1879 – March 8, 1952) was an American lawyer, jurist, and politician who served two terms as a U.S. representative from Ohio from 1915 to 1919. He also served as a judge on the Ohio Court of Appeals.

== Biography ==
Born near Lindsey, Ohio, Overmyer attended the public schools and also Lima Lutheran College. He taught school, and later graduated from the Ohio Northern University school of law at Ada in 1902.

=== Early career ===
He was admitted to the bar in 1902 and commenced practice in Fremont, Ohio. He served as clerk of the Fremont Board of Health 1907-1910, and as city solicitor 1910-1914.

=== Congress ===
Overmyer was elected as a Democrat to the Sixty-fourth and Sixty-fifth Congresses (March 4, 1915 – March 3, 1919). He was an unsuccessful candidate for reelection in 1918 to the Sixty-sixth Congress.

=== Judge ===
He was appointed judge of the Court of Common Pleas by Gov. A.V. Donahey April 10, 1926, and elected to that position in November of the same year. He was reelected in 1930 and served until his resignation on December 1, 1934, having been appointed by Gov. George White to a vacancy in the Ohio Sixth District Court of Appeals.

Overmyer was elected in 1936 for a six-year term. In 1942, he was chosen as chief justice of the nine courts of appeals of Ohio. He retired from the courts on February 8, 1943.

=== Later career ===
He resumed the private practice of law in Fremont, Ohio, until his retirement in 1951.

=== Death and burial ===
He died in North Royalton, Ohio, March 8, 1952. He was interred in Four-Mile House Cemetery, near Fremont, Ohio.

=== Family ===
Overmyer married Nina Zelden Preston of Hardin County, Ohio at Ada, Ohio, June 17, 1903. They had a son named Richard Preston Overmyer, born in 1904. He was exalted ruler of the Fremont lodge of the B.P.O.E., a Knights of Pythias, and a Lutheran.

== Sources ==
- United States Congress. "Arthur W. Overmyer (id: O000141)". Biographical Directory of the United States Congress.

U.S. House of Representatives
Preceded by John A. Key	Member of the U.S. House of Representatives from Ohio's 13th congressional district 1915-1919	Succeeded by James T. Begg
