= John O'Neill (Ohio politician) =

American politician (1822–1905)

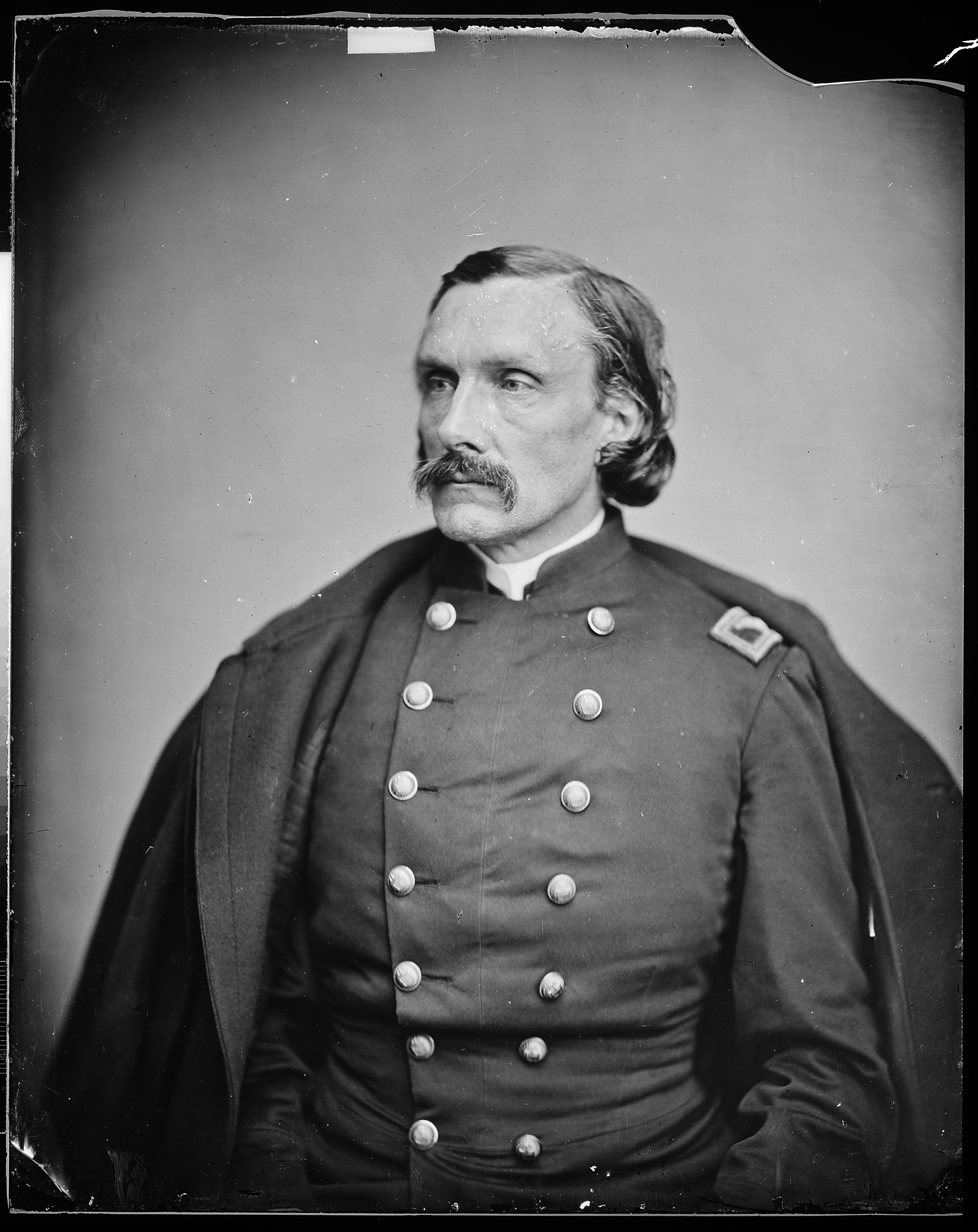

Member of the U.S. House of Representatives from Ohio's 13th district
- In office March 4, 1863 – March 3, 1865
- Preceded by: Samuel T. Worcester
- Succeeded by: Columbus Delano

Member of the Ohio Senate from the 15th & 16th district
- In office January 7, 1884 – January 1, 1888 Serving with Edwin Sinnett
- Preceded by: John D. Jones
- Succeeded by: Joseph G. Huffman; Edwin Sinnett

Personal details
- Born: December 17, 1822 Philadelphia, Pennsylvania, U.S.
- Died: May 25, 1905 (aged 82) Zanesville, Ohio, U.S.
- Resting place: St. Thomas Cemetery
- Party: Democratic
- Education: Mount St. Mary's University; Georgetown University Law Center

John O'Neill (December 17, 1822 – May 25, 1905) was an American lawyer and politician who served as a U.S. representative from Ohio for one term from 1863 to 1865,

== Early life and career ==
Born in Philadelphia, O'Neill attended the common schools at Frederick, Maryland, and Georgetown College, Washington, D.C. He was graduated from Mount St. Mary's College, Emmitsburg, Maryland, and from the law department of Georgetown College, Washington, D.C., in 1841. He was admitted to the bar in 1842. He moved to Zanesville, Ohio, in 1844 and commenced the practice of law.

He served as the prosecuting attorney of Muskingum County in 1845. He also held various county offices. He was United States Attorney for the Southern District of Ohio 1856–1858.

== Congress ==
O'Neill was elected as a Democrat to the Thirty-eighth Congress (March 4, 1863 – March 3, 1865). He resumed the practice of his profession.

== Later career and death ==
He served as member of the Ohio Senate 1883–1885. He then practiced law until his death in Zanesville, Ohio, on May 25, 1905. He was interred in St. Thomas' Cemetery.

== Sources ==
- United States Congress. "John O'Neill (id: O000096)". Biographical Directory of the United States Congress.

U.S. House of Representatives
Preceded by Samuel T. Worcester	Member of the U.S. House of Representatives from Ohio's 13th congressional district 1863–1865	Succeeded by Columbus Delano
