= James M. Gaylord =

American politician (1811–1874)

James Madison Gaylord
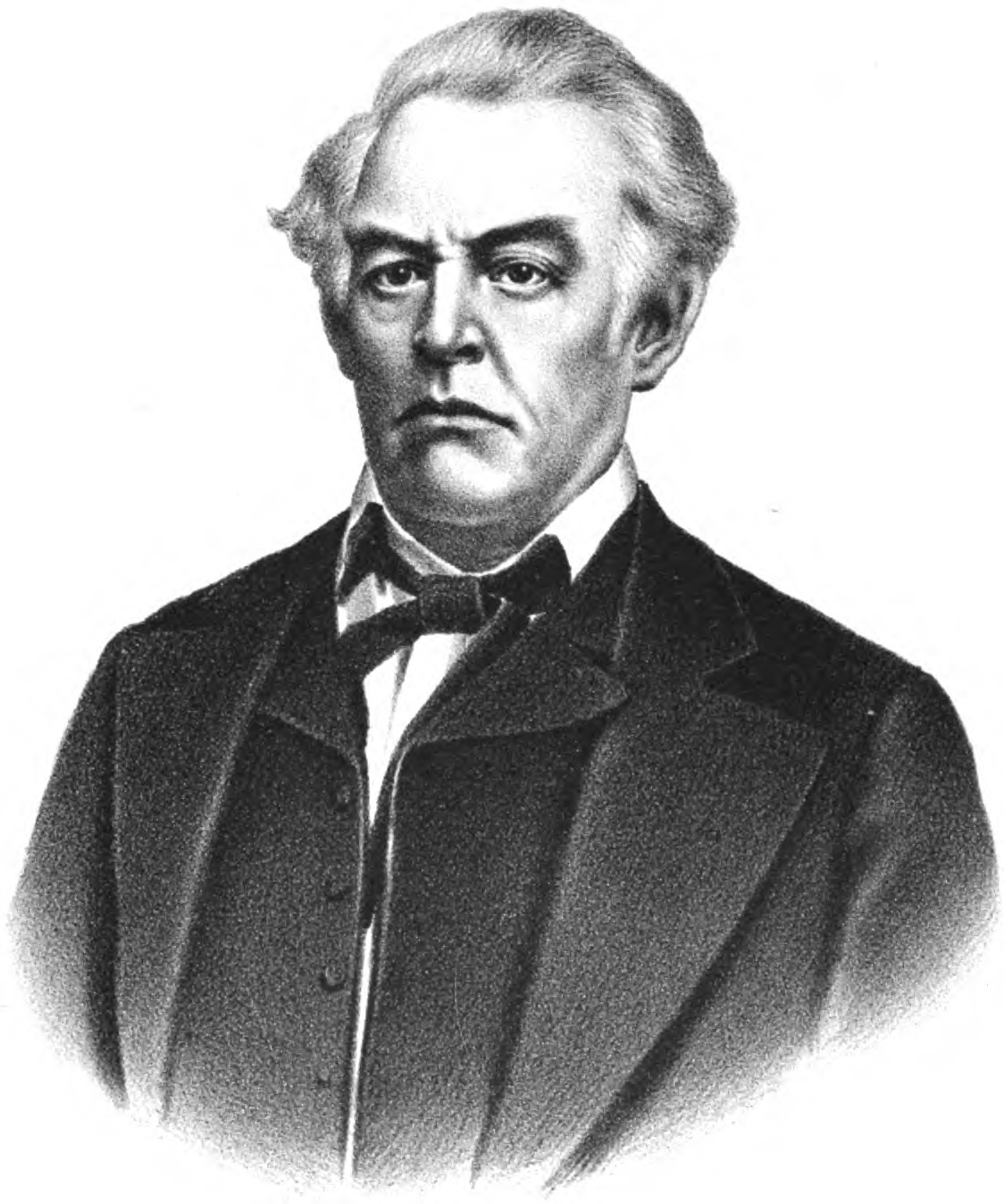

Member of the U.S. House of Representatives from Ohio's 13th district
- In office March 4, 1851 – March 3, 1853
- Preceded by: William A. Whittlesey
- Succeeded by: William D. Lindsley

Personal details
- Born: May 29, 1811 Zanesville, Ohio
- Died: June 14, 1874 (aged 63) McConnelsville, Ohio
- Resting place: McConnelsville Cemetery
- Party: Democratic
- Education: Ohio University
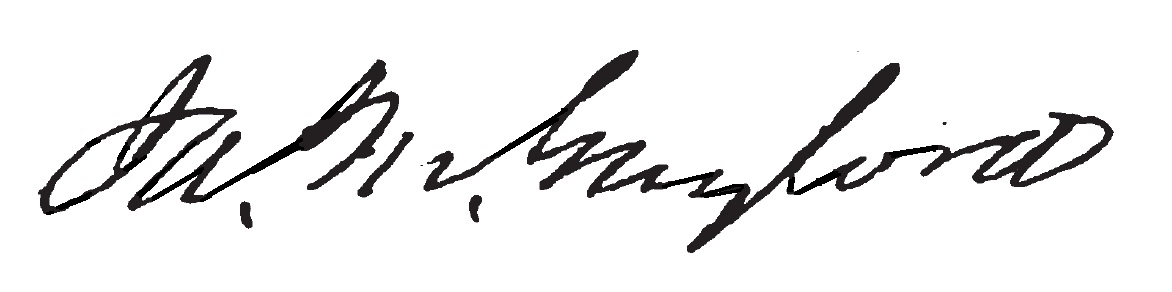
- Signature

James Madison Gaylord (May 29, 1811 – June 14, 1874) was a U.S. representative from Ohio for one term from 1851 to 1853.

== Biography ==
Born in Zanesville, Ohio, Gaylord moved to McConnelsville, Ohio, in 1818. He attended the common schools and the Ohio University at Athens. He studied law. He was admitted to the bar and practiced. He was appointed clerk of the court of common pleas in 1834.

Gaylord was elected as a Democrat to the Thirty-second Congress (March 4, 1851 – March 3, 1853). At the expiration of his term in Congress he was elected probate judge. He was appointed deputy United States marshal in 1860.

Gaylord was elected Justice of the Peace in 1865, and by successive reelections was continued in that office until his death in McConnelsville, Ohio, June 14, 1874. He was interred in McConnelsville Cemetery.

== Sources ==
- United States Congress. "James M. Gaylord (id: G000108)". Biographical Directory of the United States Congress.

U.S. House of Representatives
Preceded by William A. Whittlesey	Member of the U.S. House of Representatives from Ohio's 13th congressional district 1851–1853	Succeeded by William D. Lindsley
