= William A. Whittlesey =

American politician

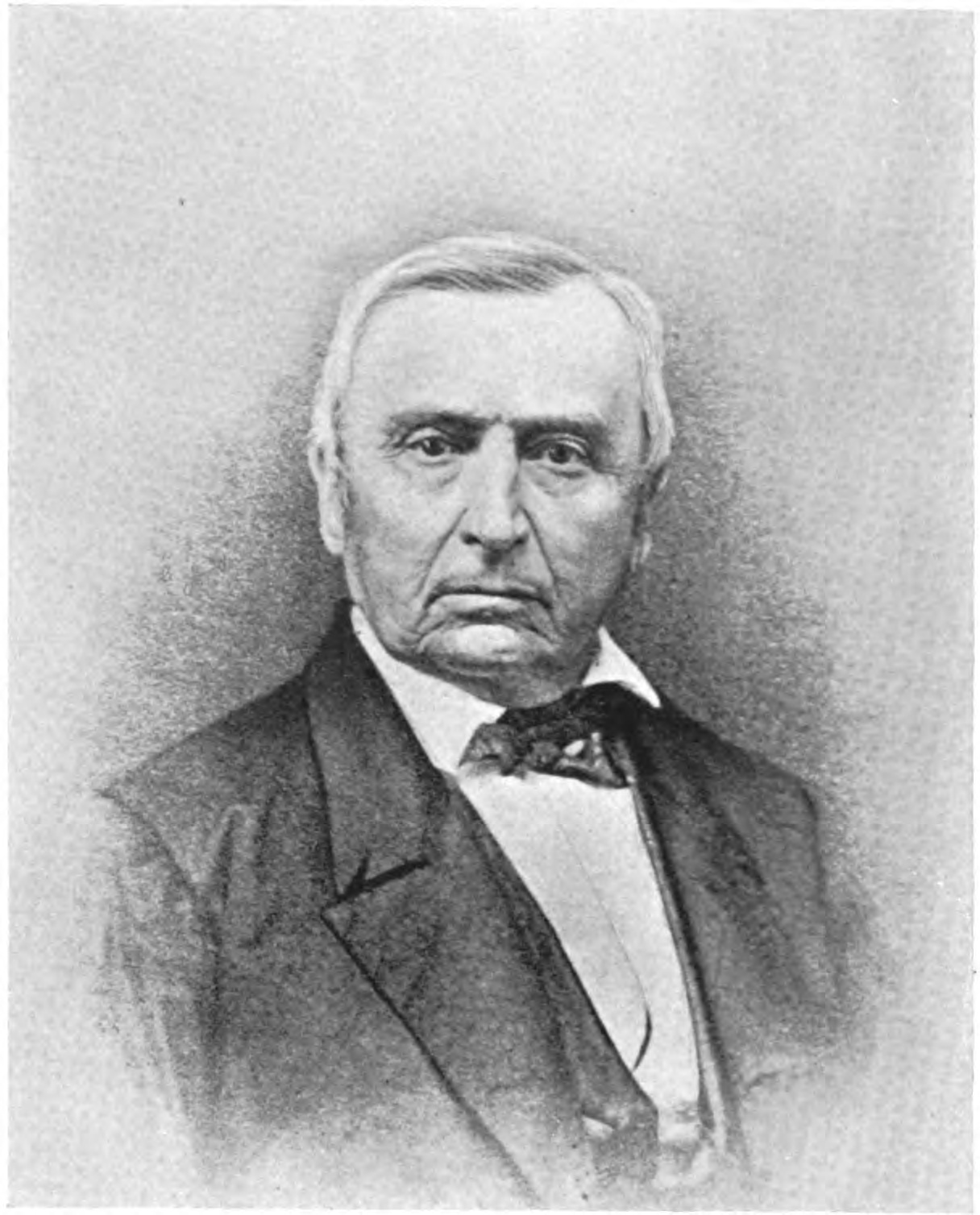

Member of the U.S. House of Representatives from Ohio's 13th district
- In office March 4, 1849 – March 3, 1851
- Preceded by: Thomas Ritchey
- Succeeded by: James M. Gaylord

Member of the Ohio House of Representatives from the Washington County district
- In office December 2, 1839 – December 6, 1840
- Preceded by: W. Curtis
- Succeeded by: Arius Nye

Personal details
- Born: William Augustus Whittlesey; July 14, 1796 Danbury, Connecticut
- Died: November 6, 1866 (aged 70) Brooklyn, New York
- Resting place: Mound Cemetery (Marietta, Ohio)
- Party: Democratic
- Spouse: Jane Hobby
- Children: four
- Education: Yale University
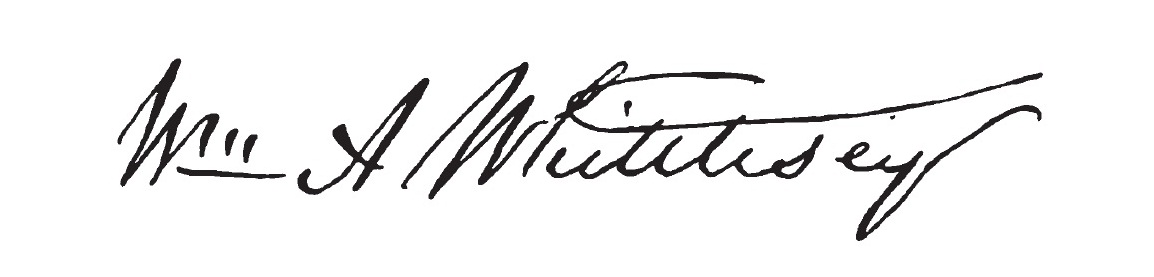
- Signature

William Augustus Whittlesey (July 14, 1796 – November 6, 1866) was an American lawyer and politician who served one term as a U.S. representative from Ohio from 1849 to 1851. He was the nephew of Elisha Whittlesey.

== Biography ==
Born in Danbury, Connecticut, Whittlesey attended the common schools and was graduated from Yale College in 1816. He was a tutor at the college. He moved to Canfield, Ohio, in 1818. He studied law at Canfield with Elisha Whittlesey, and later studied with Joshua Reed Giddings. He was admitted to the bar in 1821 and commenced practice in Canfield. He moved to Marietta, Ohio, in 1821. Auditor of Washington County from 1825 to 1837.

=== State legislature ===
He served as member of the State house of representatives in 1839 and 1840. In 1841 he formed a partnership with Charles B. Goddard of Zanesville.

=== Congress ===
Whittlesey was elected as a Democrat to the Thirty-first Congress (March 4, 1849 – March 3, 1851).

He did not seek renomination in 1850.

=== Later career and death ===
He resumed the practice of law. He served as mayor of Marietta in 1856, 1860, and 1862. He died in Brooklyn, New York, where he had gone for medical treatment, on November 6, 1866. He was interred in Mound Cemetery, Marietta, Ohio.

Whittlesey was married to Jane Hobby, October 25, 1838. They had four children. Mrs. Whittlesey died February 10, 1896, at the home of her daughter in St. Cloud, Minnesota.

== Sources ==
- United States Congress. "William A. Whittlesey (id: W000434)". Biographical Directory of the United States Congress.

U.S. House of Representatives
Preceded by Thomas Ritchey	Member of the U.S. House of Representatives from Ohio's 13th congressional district 1849–1851	Succeeded by James M. Gaylord
