= Samuel T. Worcester =

American politician

Samuel Thomas Worcester
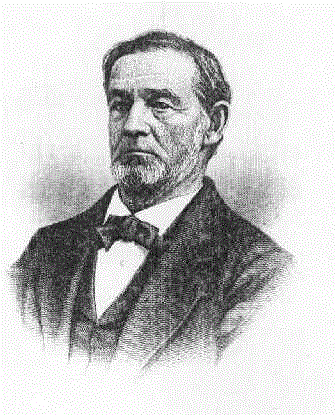

Member of the U.S. House of Representatives from Ohio's 13th district
- In office July 4, 1861 – March 3, 1863
- Preceded by: John Sherman
- Succeeded by: John O'Neill

Judge of the Ohio Court of Common Pleas
- In office 1859–1860
- Succeeded by: John L. Greene

Member of the Ohio Senate from the Huron & Erie counties district
- In office December 4, 1848 – December 1, 1850
- Preceded by: Thomas Hamilton
- Succeeded by: Earl Bill

Personal details
- Born: August 30, 1804 Hollis, New Hampshire
- Died: December 6, 1882 (aged 78) Nashua, New Hampshire
- Resting place: South Cemetery, Hollis, New Hampshire
- Party: Republican
- Education: Harvard University

Samuel Thomas Worcester (August 30, 1804 – December 6, 1882) was an American lawyer and politician who served one term as a U.S. representative from Ohio from 1861 to 1863.

== Biography ==
Born in Hollis, New Hampshire, to the large Worcester family. His siblings included Henry Aiken Worcester. Worcester attended Phillips Academy, Andover, MA, and graduated from Harvard University in 1830. He studied law. He was admitted to the bar in 1835 and began practice in Norwalk, Ohio. He served as member of the Ohio State Senate in 1849 and 1850, and served as judge of the Court of Common Pleas in 1859 and 1860.

=== Congress ===
Worcester was elected as a Republican to the Thirty-seventh Congress to fill the vacancy caused by the resignation of John Sherman and served from July 4, 1861, to March 3, 1863.

=== Later career and death ===
He resumed the practice of law and engaged in literary pursuits. He died in Nashua, New Hampshire, on December 6, 1882. He was interred in the South Cemetery, Hollis, New Hampshire.

== Sources ==
- United States Congress. "Samuel T. Worcester (id: W000741)". Biographical Directory of the United States Congress.

U.S. House of Representatives
Preceded by John Sherman	Member of the U.S. House of Representatives from Ohio's 13th congressional district 1861–1863	Succeeded by John O'Neill
