= Dudley A. White =

American journalist

Dudley White
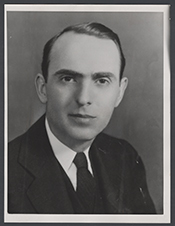

Member of the U.S. House of Representatives from Ohio's 13th district
- In office January 3, 1937 – January 3, 1941
- Preceded by: William L. Fiesinger
- Succeeded by: Albert Baumhart

Personal details
- Born: Dudley Allen White; January 3, 1901 New London, Ohio, U.S.
- Died: October 14, 1957 (aged 56) Delaware, Ohio, U.S.
- Party: Republican

Military service
- Allegiance: United States
- Branch/service: United States Navy
- Battles/wars: World War I World War II

Dudley Allen White (January 3, 1901 – October 14, 1957) was an American businessman and politician who served two terms as a U.S. representative from Ohio from 1937 to 1941.

== Biography ==
Born in New London, Ohio, White attended the public schools and was graduated from the New London High School in 1918. During the First World War served as an enlisted man in the United States Navy. He was employed with a rubber company in Akron, Ohio, in 1919 and 1920, and also engaged in the insurance business. He moved to Uhrichsville, Ohio, and engaged in the dry-goods business in 1920 and 1921. He returned to New London, Ohio, and became associated with a company manufacturing regalia and uniforms 1921–1925. He entered the newspaper business at Norwalk, Ohio, in 1925, later becoming editor and general manager. He served as delegate to the Republican National Conventions in 1928 and 1948. State commander of the American Legion in Ohio in 1929 and 1930.

=== Congress ===
White was elected as a Republican to the Seventy-fifth and Seventy-sixth Congresses (January 3, 1937 – January 3, 1941). He did not seek renomination in 1940, but was unsuccessful for the Republican nomination for United States Senator.

=== Later career ===
Called to active duty in the United States Navy in 1942 as a lieutenant commander. He was promoted to captain and served as director of recruiting and induction until 1946. He served as director of the Citizens National Bank and president of a broadcasting company in Norwalk, Ohio. He served as executive director of President Eisenhower's Commission on Intergovernmental Relations in 1954 and 1955. He served as president and publisher of the Norwalk Reflector-Herald and the Sandusky Register at time of death.

=== Death ===
He died in Delaware, Ohio, October 14, 1957. He was interred in Woodlawn Cemetery, Norwalk, Ohio.

== Sources ==
- United States Congress. "Dudley A. White (id: W000364)". Biographical Directory of the United States Congress.

U.S. House of Representatives
Preceded by William L. Fiesinger	Member of the U.S. House of Representatives from Ohio's 13th congressional district 1937–1941	Succeeded by Albert Baumhart
