= John Welborn (politician) =

American politician (1857–1907)

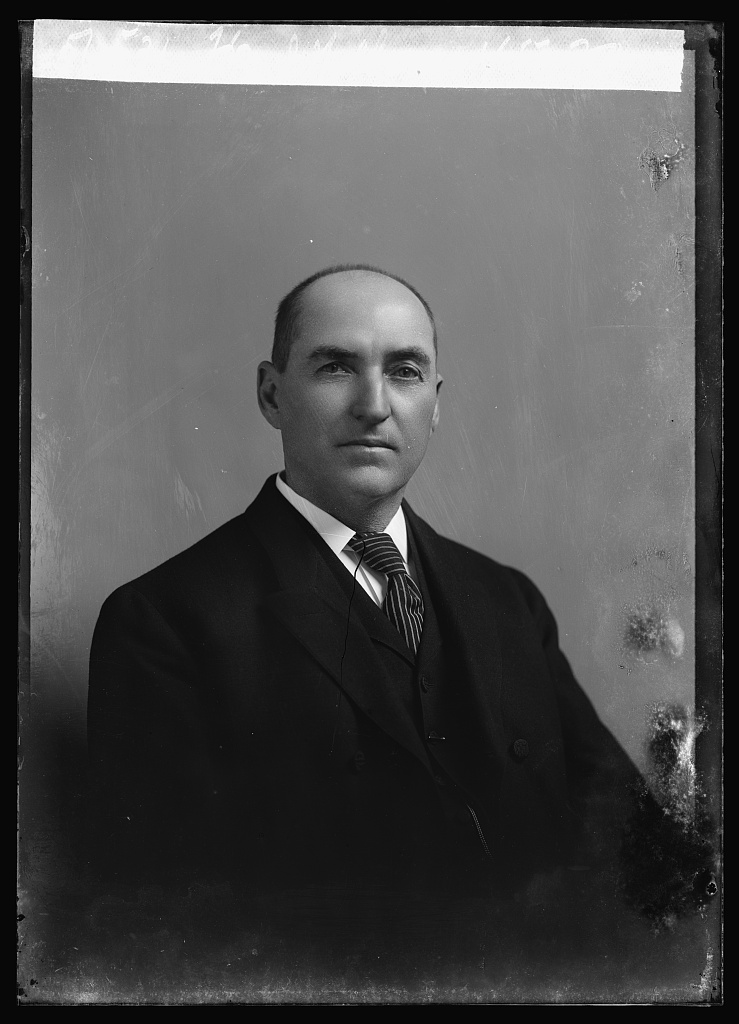

Member of the U.S. House of Representatives from Missouri's 7th district
- In office March 4, 1905 – March 3, 1907
- Preceded by: Courtney W. Hamlin
- Succeeded by: Courtney W. Hamlin

Personal details
- Born: November 20, 1857 Aullville, Missouri, U.S.
- Died: October 27, 1907 (aged 49) Lexington, Missouri, U.S.
- Party: Republican
- Profession: lawyer

John Welborn (November 20, 1857 – October 27, 1907) was an American politician who represented Missouri in the United States House of Representatives from 1905 to 1907.

== Biography ==
Welborn was born near Aullville, Missouri on November 20, 1857. He attended the public schools, and graduated from the Warrensburg State Normal School in 1876. Welborn taught school while studying law with John J. Cockrell (son of Francis Cockrell), and he attained admission to the bar in 1880. He practiced in Lexington, Missouri, where he served as city recorder from 1890 to 1891, and mayor from 1896 to 1900. In 1898 he was an unsuccessful candidate for Congress. Welborn served on the board of regents for the Warrensburg Normal School, and was a delegate to the Republican National Convention in 1900.

He was elected as a Republican to the 59th Congress, serving from March 4, 1905 to March 3, 1907. Welborn was an unsuccessful candidate for reelection in 1906 to the 60th Congress. After leaving Congress, he resumed the practice of law.

Welborn died in Lexington on October 27, 1907, just seven months after the end of his term in Congress. He was buried at Machpelah Cemetery in Lexington.

U.S. House of Representatives
Preceded by Courtney W. Hamlin	Member of the U.S. House of Representatives from Missouri's 7th congressional district 1905–1907	Succeeded by Courtney W. Hamlin
