= Alvin F. Weichel =

American politician

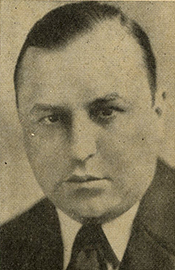

Member of the U.S. House of Representatives from Ohio's 13th district
- In office January 3, 1943 – January 3, 1955
- Preceded by: Albert David Baumhart Jr.
- Succeeded by: Albert David Baumhart Jr.

Personal details
- Born: Alvin Ferdinand Weichel; September 11, 1891 Sandusky, Ohio, U.S.
- Died: November 27, 1956 (aged 65) Sandusky, Ohio, U.S.
- Resting place: Calvary Cemetery
- Party: Republican
- Education: Ferris Institute; University of Michigan; University of Michigan Law School

Military service
- Allegiance: United States
- Branch/service: United States Army
- Years of service: December 14, 1917 – January 31, 1919
- Rank: Sergeant
- Battles/wars: World War I

Alvin Ferdinand Weichel (September 11, 1891 – November 27, 1956) was an American politician who served as a Republican member of the U.S. House of Representatives from Ohio from 1943 to 1955.

== Life and politics ==
Weichel was born in Sandusky, Ohio, three of his grandparents were German immigrants.

=== World War I ===
During World War I, he enlisted on December 14, 1917, and assigned to Company P, Ordnance Training Camp, and later to Headquarters Supply Company at Camp Hancock, Georgia, and was discharged a sergeant on January 31, 1919. He was appointed second lieutenant, Ordnance Section, Officers' Reserve Corps, December 10, 1918, and commission terminated December 8, 1928.

=== Legal career ===
He was graduated from Ferris Institute in Big Rapids, Michigan, from the University of Michigan at Ann Arbor, and from the University of Michigan Law School in 1924. He was admitted to the bar in 1924. He served as commissioner of insolvents for the State of Ohio, and prosecuting attorney of Erie County, Ohio, from 1931 to 1937.

He served as special counsel for the attorney general of Ohio and a lecturer for the School Police Administration at the Ohio State University in Columbus, Ohio.

=== Congress ===
Weichel was elected as a Republican to the Seventy-eighth and to the five succeeding Congresses. He served as chairman of the United States House Committee on Merchant Marine and Fisheries during the Eightieth and Eighty-third Congresses. Weichel made national media attention when he claimed that the Soviet Union had failed to return lend-leased ships. Weichel issued a subpoena for U.S. army General and then Secretary of State George C Marshall drawing criticism from many of his colleagues. The subpoena was withdrawn after no evidence of Soviet reluctance was found. He was not a candidate for renomination in 1954.

=== Later career and death ===
He resumed the practice of law and died in Sandusky, Ohio, on November 27, 1956. Interment in Calvary Cemetery.

U.S. House of Representatives
Preceded by A. David Baumhart Jr.	Member of the U.S. House of Representatives from Ohio's 13th congressional district 1943 - 1955	Succeeded by A. David Baumhart Jr.
