= 2016 Ohio's 8th congressional district special election =

- June 7, 2016

Ohio's 8th congressional district
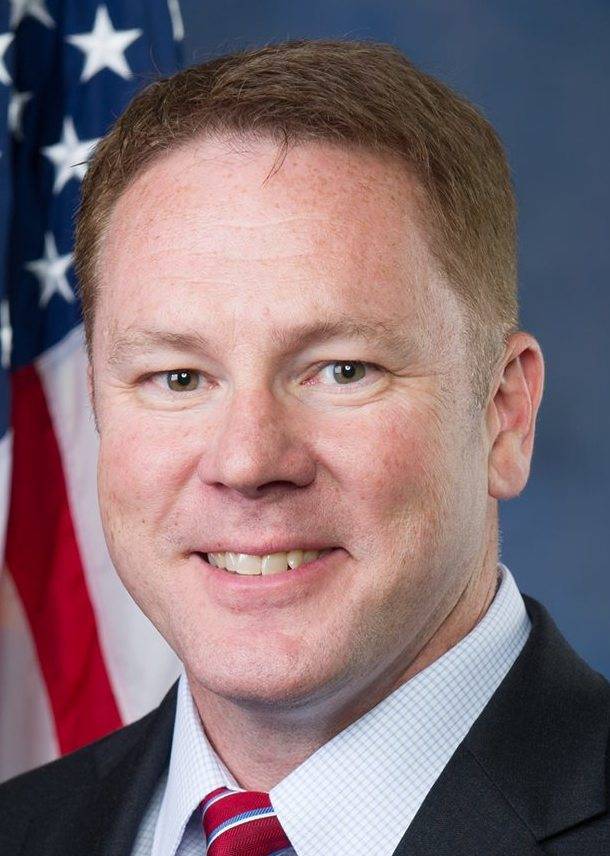

Candidate	Warren Davidson	Corey Foister
Party	Republican	Democratic
Popular vote	21,618	5,937
Percentage	76.76%	21.08%
- Davidson: 40–50% 50–60% 60–70% 70–80% 80–90% >90% Foister: 40–50% 50–60% 60–70% 70–80% 80–90% >90% Tie: 40–50% 50%
U.S. Representative before election
John Boehner
Republican
Elected U.S. Representative
Warren Davidson
Republican

A special election to the United States House of Representatives for Ohio's 8th congressional district was held to determine the successor to John Boehner, who resigned his seat on October 31, 2015. Republican Governor of Ohio John Kasich set the primary election for March 15, 2016, and the general election for June 7. The winner of the June special election ran for reelection in November 2016 but served the remainder of Boehner's 13th two-year term, which ended in early January 2017.

== Republican primary ==
Before John Boehner announced his retirement in October 2015, J. D. Winteregg and Eric Gurr both entered the race during the summer with the intention of challenging Boehner. After Boehner's retirement, over twenty Republicans pulled a petition with the Board of Elections to run for the vacant seat. Butler County Auditor Roger Reynolds was considered the front-runner for the nomination but unexpectedly suspended his campaign for the seat in December 2015.

=== Candidates ===
- Matthew Ashworth
- Bill Beagle, state senator
- Warren Davidson, businessman
- Tim Derickson, state representative
- Scott George, human resources executive
- Eric J. Haemmerle, high school government teacher
- Terri King, attorney
- Joseph Matvey
- Edward R. Meer
- John W. Robbins
- Michael Smith
- Jim Spurlino, businessman
- Kevin F. White, airline pilot and retired USAF officer
- J. D. Winteregg, former adjunct French instructor and candidate in 2014
- George Wooley

==== Withdrawn ====
- Eric Gurr, businessman and candidate in 2014
- Roger Reynolds, Butler County Auditor

==== Declined ====
- Bill Coley, state senator
- Joe Deters, Hamilton County Prosecutor and former Ohio State Treasurer
- Keith Faber, President of the Ohio Senate
- Richard K. Jones, Butler County Sheriff
- Wes Retherford, state representative
- Lee Wong, West Chester Township Trustee

=== Endorsements ===
Bill Beagle

U.S. representatives

- Mike Turner, Ohio

Ohio state senators

- Shannon Jones
- Peggy Lehner
- Gayle Manning

Ohio state representatives

- Steve Huffman

Mayors

- Lucy Fess, former mayor of Piqua, Ohio
- Pat Hale, mayor of Tipp City, Ohio

County officials

- Dick Cultice, Miami County Commissioner
- Diane Delaplane, Darke County Commissioner
- Jack Evans, Miami County Commissioner
- Matt Gearhardt, Miami County Auditor
- Bill Ginn, Miami County Coroner
- Paul Huelskamp, Miami County Engineer
- Richard K. Jones, Butler County Sheriff
- Jan Mottinger, Miami County Clerk of Courts
- Phil Plummer, Montgomery County Sheriff
- Mike Rhoades, Darke County Commissioner
- Mike Stegall, Darke County Commissioner
- Jim Stubbs, Miami County Treasurer
Warren Davidson

U.S. representatives

- Jim Jordan, Ohio

County officials

- Rick Lohnes, Clark County Commissioner

Organizations

- Citizens for Community Values
- Club for Growth
- Family Research Council
- FreedomWorks
- Senate Conservatives Fund
- Tea Party Express
Tim Derickson

Ohio state senators

- Bill Coley
- Chris Widener (president pro tempore of the Ohio Senate)

Ohio state representatives (current and former)

- Jim Buchy
- Margaret Conditt
- Courtney Combs (former)
- Ross McGregor (former)
- Wes Retherford
- Cliff Rosenberger, (Speaker of the Ohio House of Representatives)

Mayors

- David Kirsch, mayor of Eaton, Ohio
- Steve Miller, mayor of Fairfield, Ohio
- Larry Mulligan, mayor of Middletown, Ohio
- Bob Routson, mayor of Monroe, Ohio
- Calvin Woodrey, mayor of Trenton, Ohio

County officials

- Cindy Carpenter, Butler County Commissioner
- Danny Crank, Butler County Recorder
- Jeanne A. Creech, Preble County Recorder
- Rodney Creech, Preble County Commissioner
- Don Dixon, Butler County Commissioner
- John Federer, Clark County Auditor
- Mike Gmoser, Butler County Prosecutor
- Lisa Mannix, Butler County Coroner
- Nancy Nix, Butler County Treasurer
- Roger Reynolds, Butler County Auditor
- T. C. Rogers, Butler County Commissioner
- Michael Simpson, Preble County Sheriff
- Mary Swain, Butler County Clerk of Courts
- Greg Wilkins, Butler County Engineer
- Andy Wilson, Clark County Prosecutor

Organizations

- Ohio Right to Life
- Preble County Republican Party

Newspapers

- The Cincinnati Enquirer
J. D. Winteregg

Political figures

- Steve Deace, author and conservative radio host

=== Results ===
Republican primary results
Party	Candidate	Votes	%
Republican	Warren Davidson	42,230	32.27
Republican	Tim Derickson	31,303	23.92
Republican	Bill Beagle	25,672	19.62
Republican	Jim Spurlino	9,428	7.20
Republican	J. D. Winteregg	5,296	4.05
Republican	Scott George	3,054	2.33
Republican	Terri King	2,908	2.22
Republican	Kevin F. White	2,340	1.79
Republican	Michael Smith	1,966	1.50
Republican	Matthew Ashworth	1,595	1.22
Republican	John W. Robbins	1,546	1.18
Republican	Eric J. Haemmerle	1,360	1.04
Republican	George S. Wooley	1,023	0.78
Republican	Edward R. Meer	609	0.47
Republican	Joseph Matvey	535	0.41
Total votes		130,865	100.00

== Democratic primary ==
Corey Foister, founder of Next Generation America, a nonprofit organization dedicated to getting more young people involved in government. He is a stage-IV cancer survivor of neuroblastoma. At age 25, he is currently the youngest candidate in America to win the nomination of a major U.S. political party for United States Congress.

=== Candidates ===
==== Declared ====
- Corey Foister, nonprofit owner & digital content creator

==== Declined ====
- Connie Pillich, former state representative and nominee for Ohio State Treasurer in 2014
- Tom Poetter, professor and nominee in 2014
- P.G. Sittenfeld, Cincinnati City Councilman (ran for U.S. Senate)
- Jerry Springer, talk show host, former mayor of Cincinnati, nominee for OH-02 in 1970 and candidate for governor in 1982

=== Results ===
Democratic primary results
Party	Candidate	Votes	%
Democratic	Corey Foister	33,165	100.00
Total votes		33,165	100.00

== Green primary ==
James J. Condit Jr., a frequent candidate for public office as a member of the Constitution Party, ran unopposed for the Green Party's nomination. Due to his controversial remarks on Jewish Americans belief that the September 11 attacks were an inside job, his candidacy was disavowed by the Green Party of Ohio.

=== Candidates ===
- James J. Condit Jr., perennial candidate

=== Results ===
Green primary results
Party	Candidate	Votes	%
Green	James J. Condit, Jr.	212	100.00
Total votes		212	100.00

== General election ==
=== Candidates ===
- Warren Davidson (R), businessman
- Corey Foister (D), nonprofit owner
- James J. Condit Jr. (G), perennial candidate

=== Endorsements ===
Warren Davidson

U.S. representatives

- Jim Jordan, Ohio

County officials

- Rick Lohnes, Clark County Commissioner

Organizations

- Citizens for Community Values
- Club for Growth
- Family Research Council
- FreedomWorks
- Senate Conservatives Fund
- Tea Party Express
Corey Foister

Labor unions

- AFSCME
- American Federation of Teachers/Ohio Federation of Teachers
- National Nurses United
- OAPSE/AFSCME Local 4
- Ohio AFL–CIO
- SEIU
- United Food and Commercial Workers Local 7 (WFCW Local 7)
- United Steel Workers

Organizations

- Advocates For A Clean Lake Erie
- AFL–CIO
- Alliance for Retired Americans
- Brand New Congress
- Butler County Democratic Party
- Butler County Progressive PAC
- Clark County Democratic Party
- Congressional Progressive Caucus PAC
- Dayton-Miami AFL–CIO Regional Labor Council
- Democracy For America
- Friends of the Earth Action
- Justice Democrats
- League of Conservation Voters
- Miami County Democratic Party
- MoveOn
- Ohio Association of Public School Employees
- Ohio Democratic Party
- Our Revolution
- Progressive Democrats of America
- Sierra Club
- Students for Gun Legislation
- Sunrise Movement
- 90 For 90

=== Results ===
Ohio's 8th Congressional District special election, 2016
Party	Candidate	Votes	%
Republican	Warren Davidson	21,618	76.76
Democratic	Corey Foister	5,937	21.08
Green	James J. Condit, Jr.	607	2.16
Total votes		28,236	100.00
Republican hold			

== See also ==
- List of special elections to the United States House of Representatives
- Speaker of the United States House of Representatives election, October 2015
