= John Boehner =

American politician and lobbyist (born 1949)

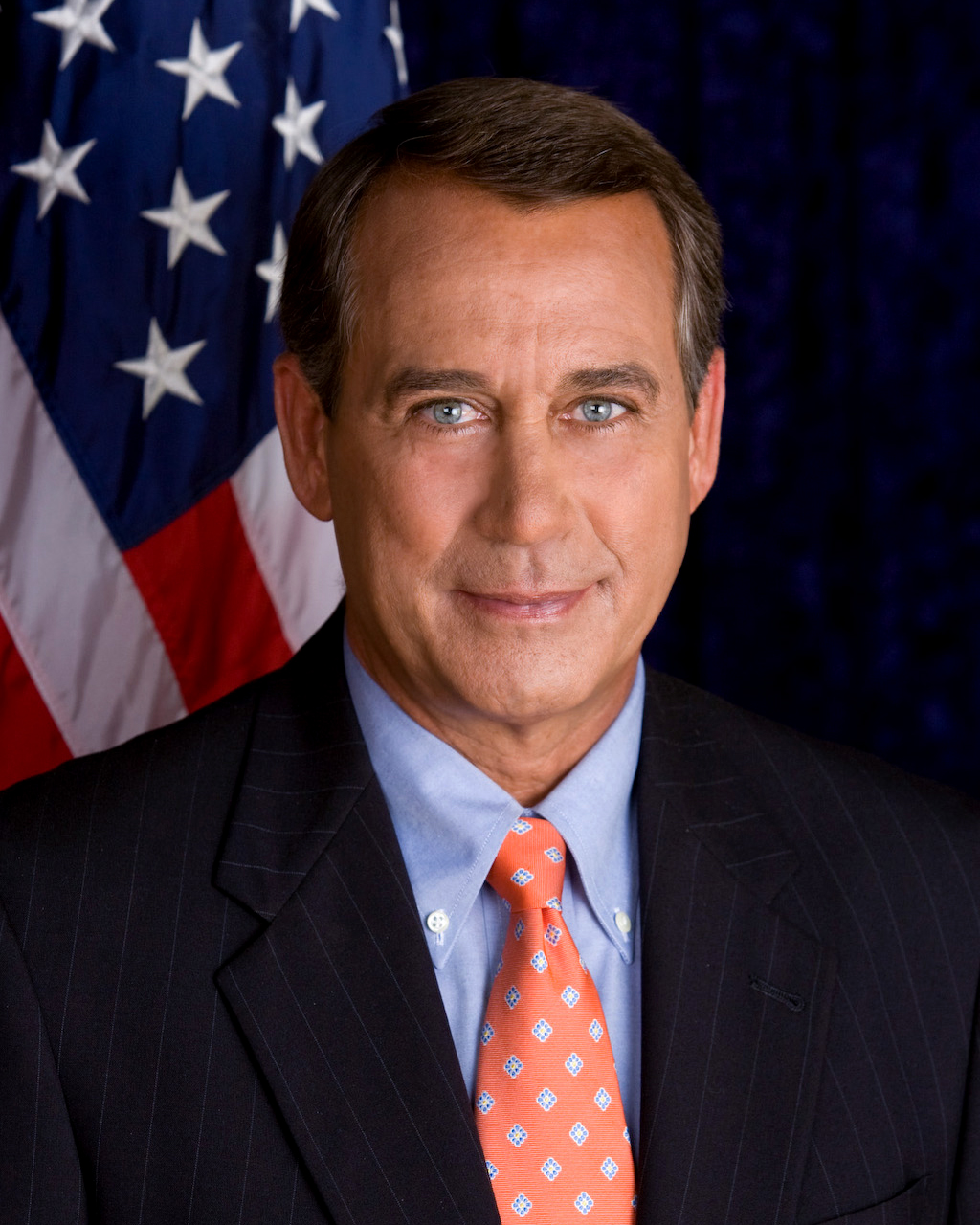
- Official portrait, 2009

53rd Speaker of the United States House of Representatives
- In office January 5, 2011 – October 29, 2015
- Preceded by: Nancy Pelosi
- Succeeded by: Paul Ryan
House positions
House Minority Leader
In office January 3, 2007 – January 3, 2011
Whip	Roy Blunt; Eric Cantor
Preceded by	Nancy Pelosi
Succeeded by	Nancy Pelosi
Leader of the House Republican Conference
In office January 3, 2007 – October 29, 2015
Deputy	Roy Blunt; Eric Cantor; Kevin McCarthy
Preceded by	Dennis Hastert
Succeeded by	Paul Ryan
House Majority Leader
In office February 2, 2006 – January 3, 2007
Speaker	Dennis Hastert
Preceded by	Roy Blunt (acting)
Succeeded by	Steny Hoyer
Chair of the House Education Committee
In office January 3, 2001 – January 3, 2006
Preceded by	William F. Goodling
Succeeded by	Howard McKeon
Chair of the House Republican Conference
In office January 3, 1995 – January 3, 1999
Leader	Newt Gingrich
Vice Chair	Susan Molinari; Jennifer Dunn
Preceded by	Dick Armey
Succeeded by	J. C. Watts

Member of the U.S. House of Representatives from Ohio's 8th district
- In office January 3, 1991 – October 31, 2015
- Preceded by: Buz Lukens
- Succeeded by: Warren Davidson

Member of the Ohio House of Representatives from the 57th district
- In office January 3, 1985 – December 31, 1990
- Preceded by: Bill Donham
- Succeeded by: Scott Nein

Personal details
- Born: John Andrew Boehner; November 17, 1949 (age 76) Reading, Ohio, U.S.
- Party: Republican
- Spouse: Deborah Gunlack (m. 1973)
- Children: 2
- Education: Xavier University (BA)

Military service
- Allegiance: United States
- Branch/service: United States Navy
- Years of service: 1968 (8 weeks)
- Boehner's voice Boehner supporting the SKILLS Act; Recorded January 27, 2014

John Andrew Boehner (/ˈbeɪnər/ BAY-nər; (Note: The German pronunciation of the Low German surname Boehner/Böhner is [ˈbøːnər]; however, Boehner's biography at House.gov recommends the pronunciation /ˈbeɪnər/ BAY-nər.) born November 17, 1949) is an American retired politician and lobbyist who served as the 53rd speaker of the United States House of Representatives from 2011 to 2015. A member of the Republican Party, he served 13 terms as the U.S. representative for Ohio's 8th congressional district from 1991 to 2015. The district included several rural and suburban areas near Cincinnati and Dayton.

Boehner previously served as the House minority leader from 2007 until 2011, and House majority leader from 2006 until 2007. In January 2011, he was first elected Speaker and then re-elected twice. Boehner resigned from the House of Representatives in October 2015 due to opposition from within the Republican conference.

In September 2016, Squire Patton Boggs, the third-largest lobbying firm in the U.S., announced that Boehner would join their firm. It was also announced that he would become a board member of Reynolds American.

== Early life and education ==
Boehner was born in Reading, Ohio, the son of Mary Anne (née Hall; 1926–1998) and Earl Henry Boehner (1925–1990), the second of twelve children. His father was of German descent and his mother had German and Irish ancestry. He grew up in modest circumstances, sharing one bathroom with his eleven siblings in a two-bedroom house in Cincinnati. He started working at his family's bar at age 8, a business founded by their grandfather Andy Boehner in 1938. He has lived in Southwest Ohio his entire life.

Boehner attended Cincinnati's Moeller High School and was a linebacker on the school's football team, where he was coached by future Notre Dame coach Gerry Faust. Graduating from Moeller in 1968, when United States involvement in the Vietnam War was at its peak, Boehner enlisted in the United States Navy but was honorably discharged after eight weeks because of a bad back. He earned his B.A. in business administration from Xavier University in 1977, becoming the first person in his family to attend college, taking seven years as he held several jobs to pay for his education.

== Early career ==
Shortly after his graduation in 1977, Boehner accepted a position with Nucite Sales, a small sales business in the plastics industry. He was steadily promoted and eventually became president of the firm, resigning in 1990 when he was elected to Congress.

From 1981 to 1984, Boehner served on the board of trustees of Union Township, Butler County, Ohio. He then served as a member of the Ohio House of Representatives from 1985 to 1990.

== U.S. House of Representatives ==
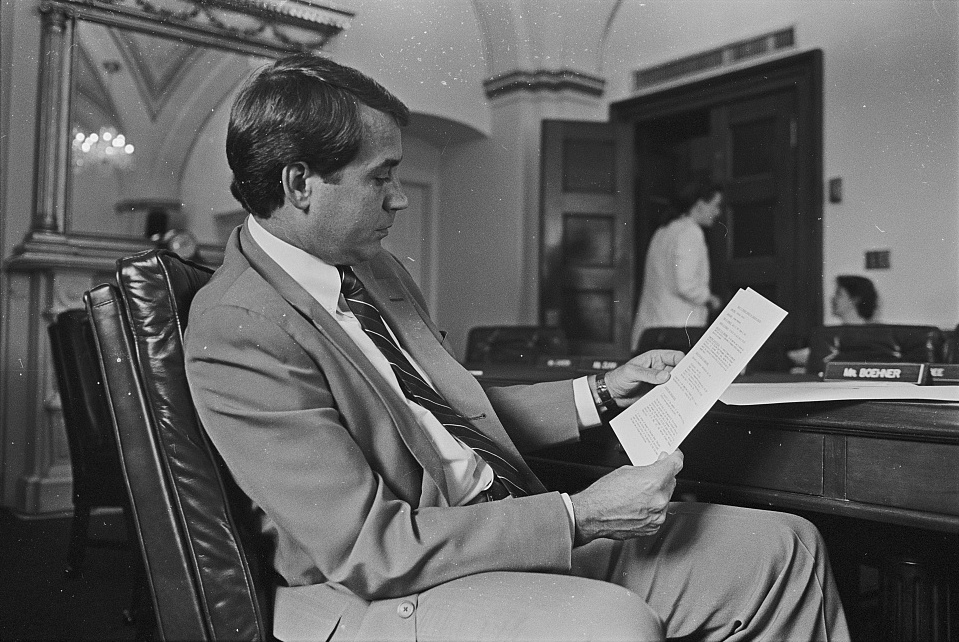
Boehner in 1993

In 1990, Boehner ran against incumbent congressman Buz Lukens, who was under fire for having a sexual relationship with a minor. He was all but unknown when he entered a Republican primary that included Lukens and former congressman Tom Kindness. Despite being dramatically outspent, Boehner won with 49 percent of the vote. He then handily beat his Democratic opponent, Greg Jolivette, in the November election. He was subsequently re-elected to Congress 12 times, each by a substantial margin.

Boehner's closest races were those in:

- 2006, when he defeated the Democratic Party candidate, U.S. Air Force veteran Mort Meier, 64% to 36%;
- 2008, when he defeated Nicholas Von Stein, 68% to 32%;
- 2010, when he garnered 66% percent of the vote in a four-way race against Democratic nominee Justin Coussoule, Constitution Party nominee Jim Condit, and Libertarian nominee David Harlow.

=== Gang of Seven and Contract with America ===
During his freshman year, Boehner was a member of the Gang of Seven which was involved in bringing media attention to the House banking scandal. The group also investigated the Congressional Post Office, leading to the indictment of Congressman Dan Rostenkowski. Later, he, along with Newt Gingrich and several other Republican lawmakers, was one of the engineers of the Contract with America in 1994 that politically helped Republicans during the 1994 elections during which they won the majority in Congress for the first time in four decades.

=== Republican leadership ===
From 1995 to 1999, Boehner served as House Republican Conference Chairman, making him fourth-ranking House Republican behind Gingrich, Majority Leader Dick Armey and Majority Whip Tom DeLay. During his time as Conference Chairman, Boehner championed the Freedom to Farm Act that, among other provisions, revised and simplified direct payment programs for crops and eliminated milk price supports through direct government purchases.

In the summer of 1997 several House Republicans, who saw Speaker Newt Gingrich's public image as a liability, attempted to replace him as Speaker. The attempted "coup" began July 9 with a meeting between Republican conference chairman Boehner and Republican leadership chairman Bill Paxon of New York. According to their plan, House Majority Leader Dick Armey, House Majority Whip Tom DeLay, Boehner and Paxon were to present Gingrich with an ultimatum: resign, or be voted out. However, Armey balked at the proposal to make Paxon the new Speaker and told his chief of staff to warn Gingrich about the coup.

On July 11, Gingrich met with senior Republican leadership to assess the situation. He explained that under no circumstance would he step down. If he was voted out, there would be a new election for Speaker, which would allow for the possibility that Democrats – along with dissenting Republicans – would vote in Dick Gephardt as Speaker. On July 16, Paxon offered to resign from his post, feeling that he had not handled the situation correctly. Paxon was the only unelected member of the leadership group, having been appointed to his position by Gingrich.

After Republicans lost seats in the 1998 elections, the House Republican leadership underwent a reorganization. Armey and DeLay kept their positions, but Gingrich was replaced by Dennis Hastert, and Boehner lost his position as conference chairman to J.C. Watts.

=== Chairman of Committee on Education and Labor ===
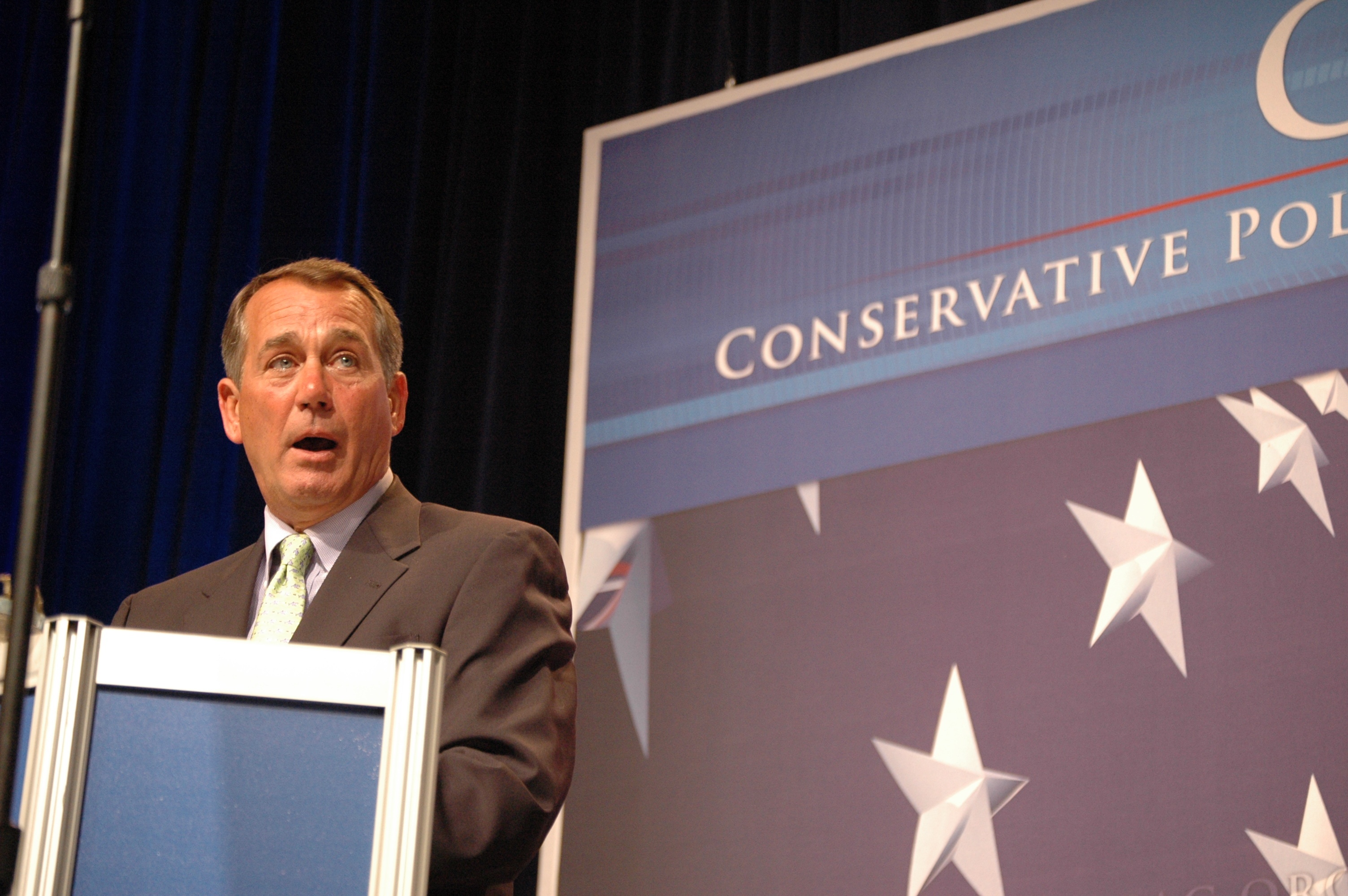
Boehner addresses the 2010 Conservative Political Action Conference (CPAC) while serving as House Minority Leader.

Following the election of President George W. Bush, Boehner was elected as chairman of the House Education and the Workforce Committee, serving from 2001 until 2006. There he authored several reforms including the Pension Protection Act and a successful school choice voucher program for low-income children in Washington, D.C.

Boehner and Senator Ted Kennedy authored the passage of the No Child Left Behind Act of 2001, which was signed by President George W. Bush in 2002. Boehner said that it was his "proudest achievement" in two decades of public service. Boehner was friends with Kennedy, also a Catholic, and every year they chaired fundraisers for cash-strapped Catholic schools.

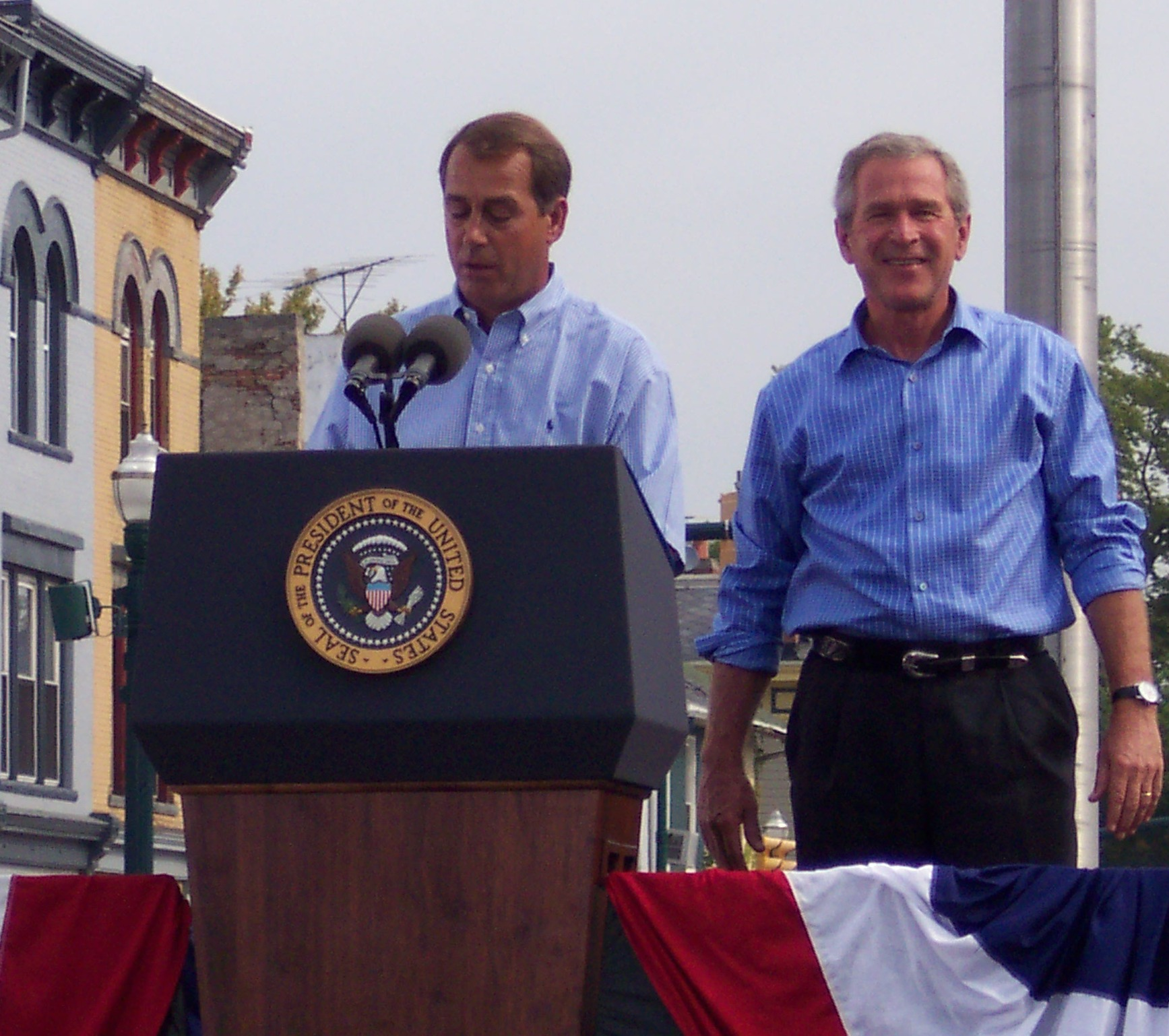
Boehner introducing then-president George W. Bush in Troy, Ohio in 2003

=== House Republican Leader ===
After DeLay resigned as majority leader in 2005, Boehner, House majority whip Roy Blunt of Missouri, and Representative John Shadegg of Arizona, all sought to become Majority Leader. Boehner campaigned as a reform candidate who wanted to reform the so-called "earmark" process and rein in government spending. In the second round of voting by the House Republican Conference, Boehner defeated Blunt with 122 to 109 votes. Blunt kept his previous position as majority whip, the no. 3 leadership positions in the House. There was some confusion on the first ballot for majority leader when the first count showed one more vote cast than Republicans present, due to a misunderstanding as to whether the rules allowed Resident Commissioner of Puerto Rico Luis Fortuño to vote.

After the Republicans lost control of the House in the 2006 elections, the House Republican Conference chose Boehner as the minority leader. While as Majority Leader he was second-in-command behind Speaker Dennis Hastert, as minority leader he was the leader of the House Republicans. As such, he was the Republican nominee for Speaker in 2006 and 2008, losing both times to Nancy Pelosi.

According to the 2008 Congress.org Power Ranking, Boehner was the 6th most powerful congressman (preceded by Speaker Pelosi, Majority Leader Hoyer, Ways and Means Committee chairman Sander M. Levin, Dean of the House John Dingell, and Appropriations Committee chairman Dave Obey, all Democrats) and the most powerful Republican. As minority leader, Boehner served as an ex officio member of the Permanent Select Committee on Intelligence.

== Speaker of the House (2011–2015) ==
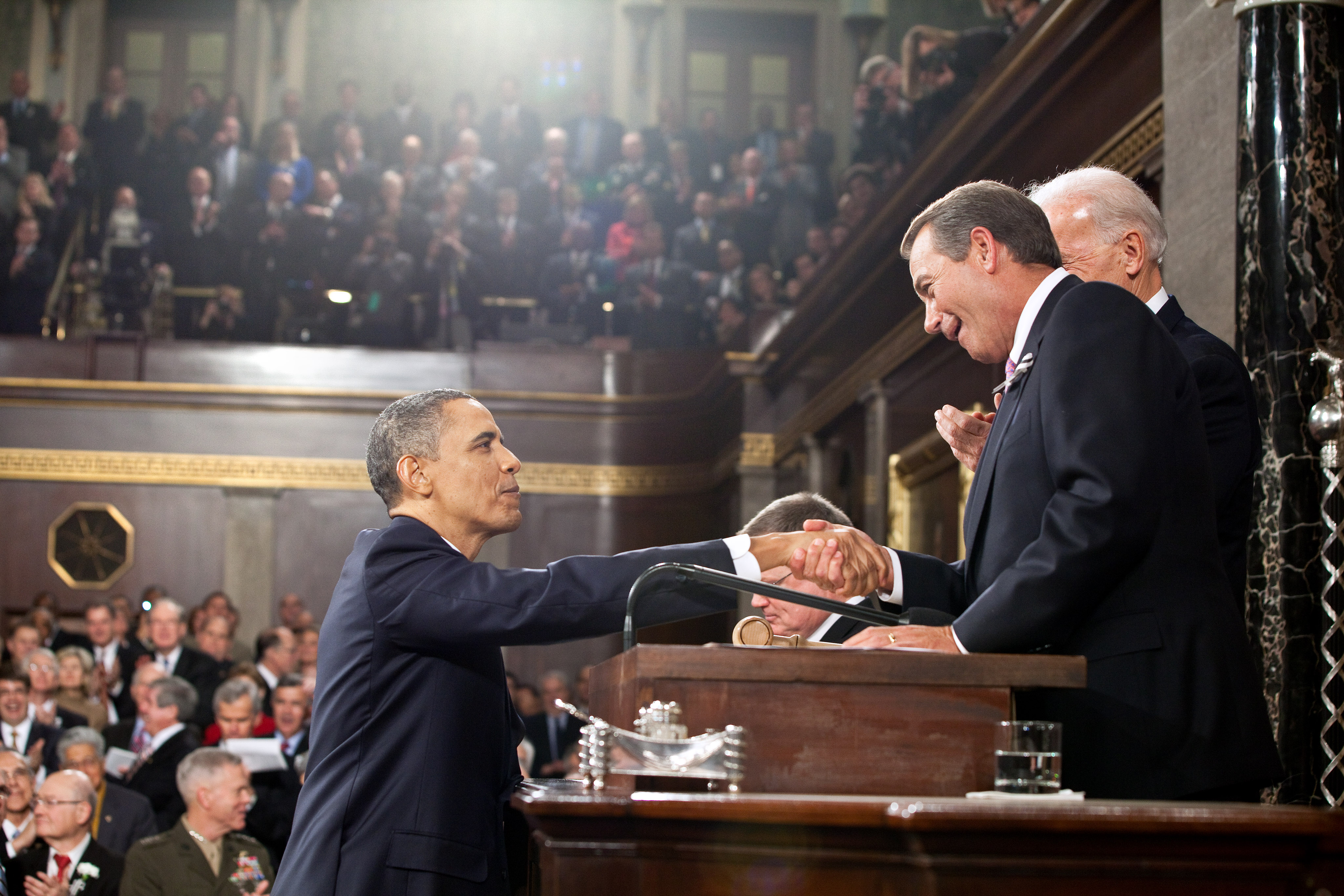
Speaker Boehner greets U.S. president Barack Obama before the 2011 State of the Union Address.

The Republicans won a majority in the House of Representatives during the 2010 midterm elections, with a net gain of 63 seats. During his solemn victory speech, Boehner broke into tears when talking about "economic freedom, individual liberty and personal responsibility...I hold these values dear because I've lived them...I've spent my whole life chasing the American Dream". On November 17, 2010, Boehner was unanimously chosen by the House Republicans as their nominee for Speaker, all but assuring his formal election to the post when the new Congress convened with a Republican majority in January 2011. He received the gavel from outgoing speaker Pelosi on Wednesday, January 5, 2011. He was the first Speaker from Ohio since fellow Republicans Nicholas Longworth (1925 to 1931) and J. Warren Keifer (1881 to 1883).

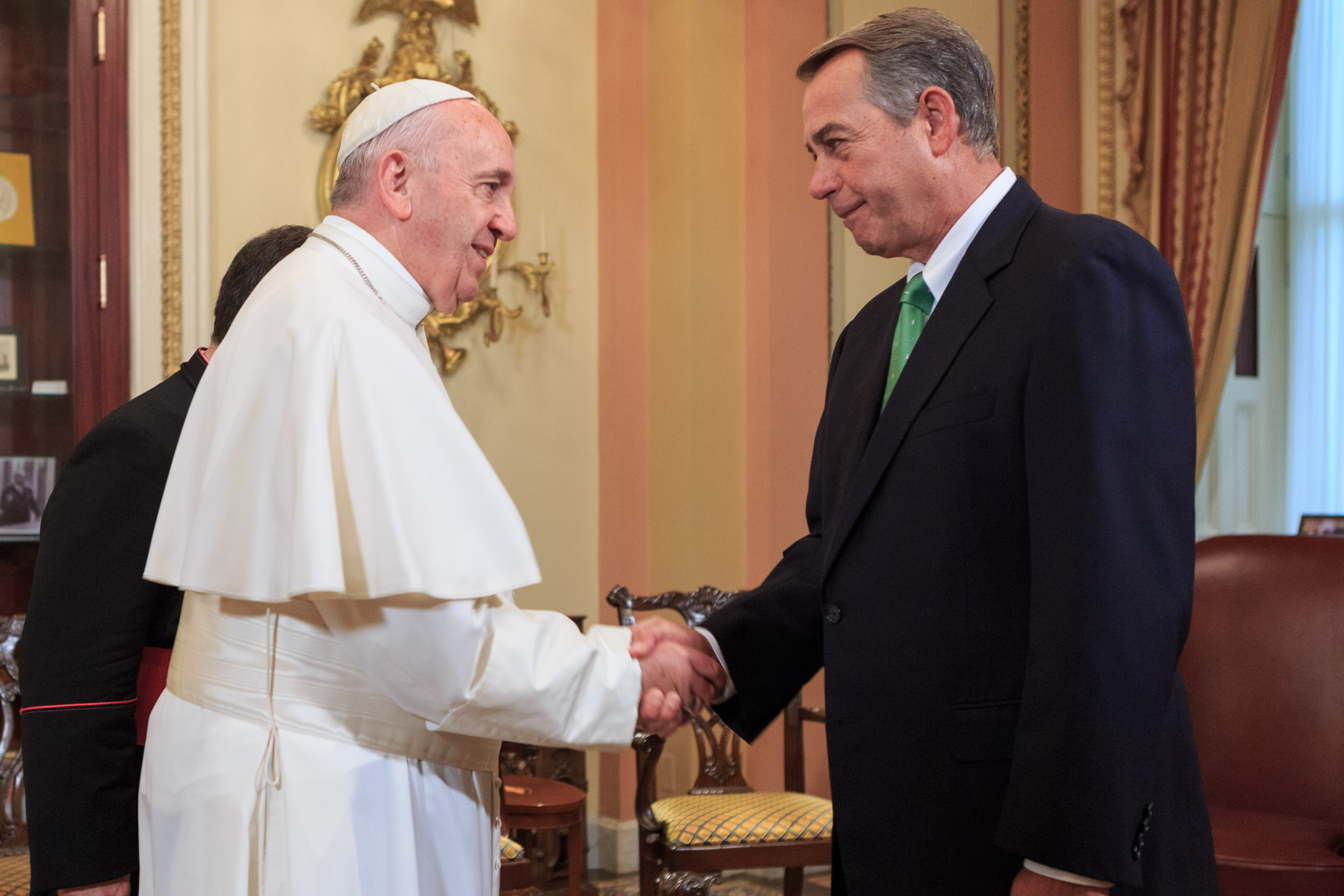
Speaker Boehner meets with Pope Francis during his visit to the United States Congress.

As Speaker, he was still the leader of the House Republicans. However, by tradition, he normally did not take part in debate, although he had the right to do so, and rarely voted from the floor. He was not a member of any House committees during his speakership.

Boehner was narrowly re-elected as Speaker of the House on January 3, 2013, at the beginning of the 113th United States Congress.He received 220 votes, needing 214 to win.

In July 2014, Boehner moved forward on a lawsuit to force the President to impose penalties on companies who failed to provide healthcare coverage for their employees. Boehner had pressed for legislation to delay this mandate the previous year. The third law firm selected finally filed the suit in November 2014, after Boehner criticized Obama's unilateral moves on immigration policy.

=== Resignation ===
On September 25, 2015, Boehner announced that he would step down as Speaker and resign from Congress at the end of October 2015.Boehner's resignation took place after Pope Francis' address to Congress the day before, an event considered by Boehner personally as the highest point in his legislative career. Sources in his office indicated he was stepping aside in the face of increasing discord while trying to manage the passage of a continuing resolution to fund the government. Conservative opposition to funding Planned Parenthood as part of the resolution, and stronger threats to Boehner's leadership on account of the controversy, prompted the resignation.

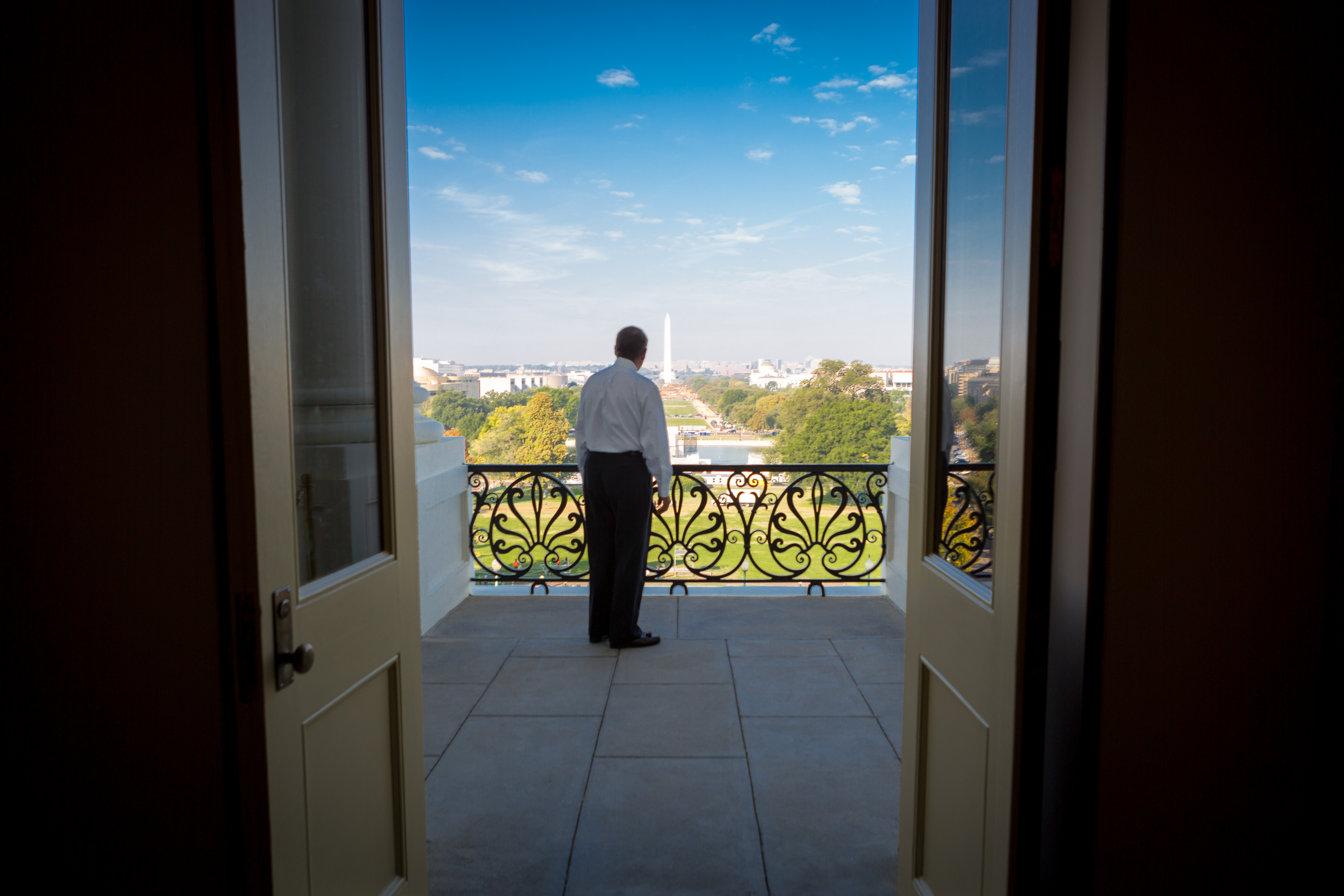
Speaker Boehner looks at the National Mall from the Speaker's balcony at the U.S. Capitol for one final time before leaving office.

Originally, House majority leader Kevin McCarthy of California had intended to run for Speaker and was seen as the prohibitive favorite. On October 8, 2015, McCarthy abruptly rescinded his candidacy, citing that he felt he could not effectively lead a fractured Republican Conference. After McCarthy's announcement, Boehner stayed on as Speaker until a successor was chosen. After initially turning down requests from Republican leaders, Paul Ryan of Wisconsin, the Ways and Means Committee chairman and 2012 Republican vice presidential nominee, ran for Speaker with Boehner's blessing. On October 29, 2015, in his final act as Speaker, Boehner presided over Ryan's election. Boehner's resignation from Congress became official on October 31, 2015, at 11:59 p.m.

== Political positions ==
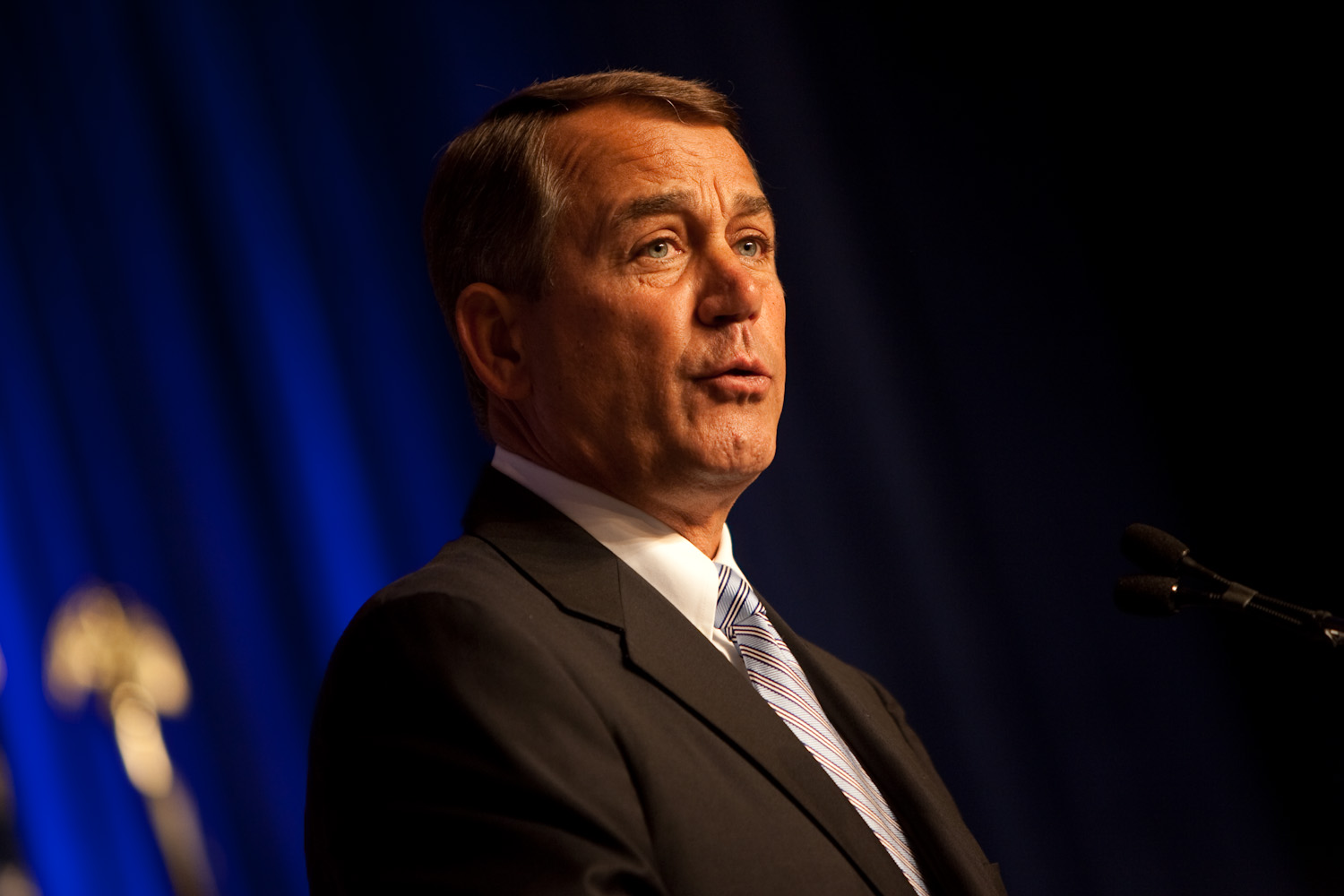
Boehner speaking at the 2009 Conservative Political Action Conference

A profile in the Pittsburgh Tribune-Review said, "On both sides of the aisle, Boehner earns praise for candor and an ability to listen." The Plain Dealer says Boehner "has perfected the art of disagreeing without being disagreeable."

Boehner has been classified as a "hard-core conservative" by OnTheIssues. Although Boehner has a conservative voting record when he was running for House leadership, religious conservatives in the GOP expressed that they were not satisfied with his positions. According to The Washington Post: "From illegal immigration to sanctions on China to an overhaul of the pension system, Boehner, as chairman of the House Committee on Education and the Workforce, took ardently pro-business positions that were contrary to those of many in his party. Religious conservatives – examining his voting record – see him as a policymaker driven by small-government economic concerns, not theirs."

Boehner opposes same-sex marriage, as evidenced by his vote for the Federal Marriage Amendment in both 2004 and 2006. In a letter to the Human Rights Campaign, Boehner stated, "I oppose any legislation that would provide special rights for homosexuals... Please be assured that I will continue to work to protect the idea of the traditional family as one of the fundamental tenets of western civilization."

On May 25, 2006, Boehner issued a statement defending his agenda and attacking his "Democrat friends" such as Minority Leader Nancy Pelosi. Boehner said regarding national security that voters "have a choice between a Republican Party that understands the stakes and is dedicated to victory and a Democrat Party with a non-existent national security policy that sheepishly dismisses the challenges of a post-9/11 world and is all too willing to concede defeat on the battlefield in Iraq."

Boehner is a signer of Americans for Tax Reform's Taxpayer Protection Pledge.

In June 2013, Boehner labeled former NSA contractor Edward Snowden a traitor after his leaks went public.

"I'm not qualified to debate the science over climate change", Boehner said at a press conference on May 29, 2014, at which he criticized proposed federal regulations on coal-fired power plants.

In 2011, Boehner opposed the NATO-led military intervention in Libya. In 2015, Boehner supported the Saudi Arabian-led intervention in Yemen, saying: "I applaud the Saudis for taking this action to protect their homeland and to protect their neighborhood."

=== Financial crisis ===
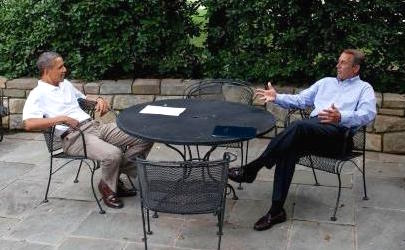
Speaker Boehner meets with President Obama at the White House during the 2011 debt ceiling increase negotiations.

On September 18, 2008, Congressman Boehner attended a closed meeting with congressional leaders, then-Treasury Secretary Henry Paulson and Federal Reserve Chairman Ben Bernanke, and was urged to craft legislation to help financially troubled banks. That same day (trade effective the next day), Congressman Boehner cashed out of an equity mutual fund.

On October 3, 2008, Boehner voted in favor of the Troubled Asset Relief Program (TARP), believing that the enumerated powers grant Congress the authority to "purchase assets and equity from financial institutions to strengthen its financial sector."

Boehner had been highly critical of several initiatives by the Democratic Congress and President Barack Obama, including the "cap and trade" plan that Boehner said would hurt job growth in his congressional district and elsewhere. He opposed the Patient Protection and Affordable Care Act and said that, if Republicans took control of the House of Representatives in the 2010 elections, they would do whatever it takes to stop the act. One option would be to defund the administrative aspect of the Act, not paying "one dime" of the salaries of the workers who would administer the plan. He also led opposition to the 2009 stimulus and to Obama's first budget proposal, promoting instead an alternative economic recovery plan and a Republican budget (authored by Ranking Rep. Paul Ryan, R-WI). He advocated for an across-the-board spending freeze, including entitlement programs. Boehner favored making changes in Social Security, such as by raising the retirement age to 70 for people who have at least 20 years until retirement, as well as tying cost-of-living increases to the consumer price index rather than wage inflation, and limiting payments to those who need them.

In 2011, Boehner called the No Taxpayer Funding for Abortion Act "one of our highest legislative priorities."

In 2013, Boehner led his caucus in a strategy to freeze Defense spending in order to avoid reducing the deficit with revenue increases.

As Republican House Leader, Boehner was a Democratic target for criticism of Republican views and political positions. In July 2010, President Barack Obama began singling out Boehner for criticism during his speeches. In one speech, Obama mentioned Boehner's name nine times, and accused him of believing that police, firefighters, and teachers were jobs "not worth saving".

== Later career ==
=== Politics ===
Boehner made headlines in April 2016 when he referred to Republican presidential candidate Ted Cruz as "Lucifer in the flesh" in an interview at Stanford University. On May 12, after Donald Trump became the presumptive Republican nominee, Boehner's support for him (while distancing himself from Trump on several policies) became public; he also expressed satisfaction with Cruz not securing the nomination: "Thank God the guy from Texas didn't win." On February 23, 2017, Boehner predicted Republicans would "fix" the Affordable Care Act and give it a different name as opposed to their stated intent to repeal and replace.

On August 17, 2020, a spokesperson for Boehner stated that he would not endorse either President Trump or Joe Biden for the 2020 United States presidential election, saying: "The answer is no. I think he'd rather set himself on fire than get involved in the election. Nothing to see here." Despite his critiques, Boehner confirmed he voted for Trump in the 2020 presidential election. Explaining his vote, he said: "At the end of the day, who gets nominated to the federal courts is the most important thing a President does."

After the January 6 United States Capitol attack, Boehner called on Republicans to "awaken", saying: "The invasion of our Capitol by a mob, incited by lies from some entrusted with power, is a disgrace to all who sacrificed to build our Republic." Boehner later congratulated Biden on his victory after the vote was certified. He has frequently reiterated his feelings, on one account noting how Trump "Incited That Bloody Insurrection", and called Ted Cruz "a reckless asshole who thinks he is smarter than everyone else". Boehner said that Trump should "consider resigning" and that President Trump had "violated his oath of office to protect and defend the Constitution of the United States." Boehner continued to express his disdain for Trump through 2023, where he stated his belief that the GOP needs to "move on" from Trump during a June interview with CBS News.

Boehner's political memoir, titled On the House: A Washington Memoir, was published by St. Martin's Press on April 13, 2021. Excerpts began appearing early in April. In this memoir, he lambasts Cruz, Michele Bachmann, Sean Hannity, Rush Limbaugh, and Trump. It also covers how the Tea Party movement, which forced him into retirement, later morphed into Trumpism. In response to the criticism he received in the book, Cruz threatened to burn Boehner's book if his supporters could fulfil his “72-hour drive to raise $250,000” in campaign funds.

Despite his resignation from politics, during the October 2023 Speaker of the House election following the removal of Kevin McCarthy, Boehner received one vote to reprise his role as Speaker of the United States House of Representatives.

=== Business ===
Boehner joined the board of tobacco company Reynolds American on September 15, 2016. In 2018, Boehner joined the board of Acreage Holdings, a cannabis corporation, to promote the medical use of cannabis and advocate for federal de-scheduling of the drug (a shift from his previous stance while in Congress). In 2019, Boehner was named chair of the National Cannabis Roundtable, a cannabis lobbying organization.

== Controversies ==
In June 1995, Boehner distributed campaign contributions from tobacco industry lobbyists on the House floor as House members were weighing how to vote on tobacco subsidies. In a 1996 documentary by PBS called The People and the Power Game, Boehner said "They asked me to give out a half dozen checks quickly before we got to the end of the month and I complied. And I did it on the House floor, which I regret. I should not have done so. It's not a violation of the House rules, but it's a practice that's gone on here for a long time that we're trying to stop and I know I'll never do it again." Boehner eventually led the effort to change House rules and prohibit campaign contributions from being distributed on the House floor. A September 2010 story in The New York Times said Boehner was "Tightly Bound to Lobbyists" and that "He maintains especially tight ties with a circle of lobbyists and former aides representing some of the nation's biggest businesses, including Goldman Sachs, Google, Citigroup, R.J. Reynolds, MillerCoors and UPS.".

In November 2010, Boehner, along with Minority Whip Eric Cantor, called for the cancellation of an exhibit in the Smithsonian's National Portrait Gallery after he learned that it featured a video by David Wojnarowicz, A Fire in My Belly, that contained an image of a crucifix with ants crawling on it. Boehner spokesman Kevin Smith said, "Smithsonian officials should either acknowledge the mistake and correct it, or be prepared to face tough scrutiny beginning in January when the new majority in the House moves [in]."

On January 1, 2013, after passing the fiscal cliff deal, Boehner adjourned the House without passing the $60 million Hurricane Sandy relief bill. Some Representatives, especially from the Northeast and including Republicans as well as Democrats, and New Jersey Governor Chris Christie harshly criticized Boehner. Boehner later promised to pass the bill.

Many Republicans were ready for a new House of Representatives Chairman following the 2014 mid-term elections. EMC Research reported 60% of participants in their telephone survey wanted a new chairman. In the end there were a total of 25 votes against Boehner; 29 were needed in order to choose a new speaker. Boehner responded by removing those who opposed him from influential committees.

== Legacy ==
In reporting his pending retirement, Politico summarized his Speakership:

Boehner came into power on the momentum of the 2010 tea party wave. But it was that movement that gave him constant problems. He clashed with social conservatives over the debt limit, government funding, Obamacare and taxes. But his tenure will also be remembered for his complicated relationship with President Barack Obama. He and Obama tried – but repeatedly failed – to cut a deal on a sweeping fiscal agreement. But Boehner has had some significant victories, including the trade deal that Congress passed this year, and changes to entitlement programs.

Paul Kane in The Washington Post emphasizes how none of the "big deals" he sought were ever reached:

Boehner never landed the really big deal he craved. Not the $4 trillion tax-and-entitlement deal he reached for in 2011, not the repackaged version a year later and not the immigration overhaul he sought in 2014.

Furthermore, Kane argues, Boehner's persona alienated conservative Republicans who demanded more vigorous attacks on Obama and instead perceived, "a country club Republican who loved to play 18 holes of golf and drink merlot afterward while cutting deals. In an era of shouting and confrontation, on talk radio or cable TV, Boehner's easygoing style did not fit."

At the 2016 White House Correspondents' Dinner, Boehner appeared in a pre-recorded comedic video in which he humorously portrayed his relationship with President Obama, responding to a request for retirement advice with the remark, "So now you want my advice?".

== Personal life ==
Boehner and his wife Debbie were married in 1973, and lived in the Wetherington section of West Chester Township, Ohio. They have two daughters, Lindsay and Tricia. Boehner has been known to be emotional and cry during noteworthy events.

On May 15, 2016, Boehner was awarded the Laetare Medal, considered the highest honor for American Catholics, by the University of Notre Dame. The medal was awarded to Joe Biden at the same time.

== Publications ==
- Boehner, John (2021). On the House: A Washington Memoir. New York: St. Martin's Press. ISBN 978-1250238443. OCLC 1200038796.

== Honors ==
- Japan:
  - Grand Cordon of the Order of the Rising Sun (14 March 2017)

== Electoral history ==
=== Congressional elections ===
- Note: vote percentages may not total 100% because of rounding.

Ohio's 8th congressional district election, 1990
Party	Candidate	Votes	%
Republican	John Boehner	99,955	61
Democratic	Gregory Jolivette	63,584	39

Ohio's 8th congressional district election, 1992 * denotes incumbent
Party	Candidate	Votes	%
Republican	John Boehner*	176,362	74
Democratic	Fred Sennet	62,033	26

Ohio's 8th congressional district election, 1994 * denotes incumbent
Party	Candidate	Votes	%
Republican	John Boehner*	148,338	100
	write-in	87	0

Ohio's 8th congressional district election, 1996 * denotes incumbent
Party	Candidate	Votes	%
Republican	John Boehner*	165,815	70
Democratic	Jeffrey Kitchen	61,515	26
Natural Law	William Baker	8,613	4

Ohio's 8th congressional district election, 1998 * denotes incumbent
Party	Candidate	Votes	%
Republican	John Boehner*	127,979	71
Democratic	John W. Griffin	52,912	29

Ohio's 8th congressional district election, 2000 * denotes incumbent
Party	Candidate	Votes	%
Republican	John Boehner*	179,756	71
Democratic	John G. Parks	66,293	26
Libertarian	David Shock	7,254	3

Ohio's 8th congressional district election, 2002 * denotes incumbent
Party	Candidate	Votes	%
Republican	John Boehner*	119,947	71
Democratic	Jeff Hardenbrook	49,444	29

Ohio's 8th congressional district election, 2004 * denotes incumbent
Party	Candidate	Votes	%
Republican	John Boehner*	201,675	69
Democratic	Jeff Hardenbrook	90,574	31

Ohio's 8th congressional district election, 2006 * denotes incumbent
Party	Candidate	Votes	%
Republican	John Boehner*	136,863	64
Democratic	Mort Meier	77,640	36

Ohio's 8th congressional district election, 2008 * denotes incumbent
Party	Candidate	Votes	%
Republican	John Boehner*	202,063	68
Democratic	Nicholas Van Stein	95,510	32

Ohio's 8th congressional district election, 2010 * denotes incumbent
Party	Candidate	Votes	%
Republican	John Boehner*	142,731	66
Democratic	Justin Coussoule	65,883	30
Libertarian	David Harlow	5,121	2
Constitution	James Condit	3,701	2

Ohio's 8th congressional district election, 2012 * denotes incumbent
Party	Candidate	Votes	%
Republican	John Boehner*	246,378	99
Constitution	James Condit	1,938	1

Ohio's 8th congressional district election, 2014 * denotes incumbent
Party	Candidate	Votes	%
Republican	John Boehner*	126,539	67
Democratic	Tom Poetter	51,534	27
Constitution	James Condit	10,257	5

=== Speaker of the House elections ===
- Note: vote percentages may not total 100% because of rounding.

2007 election for Speaker – 110th Congress
Party	Candidate	Votes	%
Democratic	Nancy Pelosi (CA 8)	233	54
Republican	John Boehner (OH 8)	202	46
Total votes		435	100
Votes necessary		218	>50

2009 election for Speaker – 111th Congress * denotes incumbent
Party	Candidate	Votes	%
Democratic	Nancy Pelosi* (CA 8)	255	59
Republican	John Boehner (OH 8)	174	41
Total votes		429	100
Votes necessary		215	>50

2011 election for Speaker – 112th Congress * denotes incumbent
Party	Candidate	Votes	%
Republican	John Boehner (OH 8)	241	56
Democratic	Nancy Pelosi* (CA 8)	173	40
Democratic	Heath Shuler (NC 11)	11	3
Democratic	John Lewis (GA 5)	2	0
Democratic	Dennis Cardoza (CA 18)	1	0
Democratic	Jim Costa (CA 20)	1	0
Democratic	Jim Cooper (TN 5)	1	0
Democratic	Steny Hoyer (MD 5)	1	0
Democratic	Marcy Kaptur (OH 9)	1	0
Total votes		432	100
Votes necessary		217	>50

2013 election for Speaker – 113th Congress * denotes incumbent
Party	Candidate	Votes	%
Republican	John Boehner* (OH 8)	220	52
Democratic	Nancy Pelosi (CA 12)	192	45
Republican	Eric Cantor (VA 7)	3	1
Democratic	Jim Cooper (TN 5)	2	0
Republican	Allen West (Note: Not a member of the House at the time)	2	0
Republican	Justin Amash (MI 3)	1	0
Democratic	John Dingell (MI 12)	1	0
Republican	Jim Jordan (OH 4)	1	0
Republican	Raúl Labrador (ID 1)	1	0
Democratic	John Lewis (GA 5)	1	0
Republican	Colin Powell	1	0
Republican	David Walker	1	0
Total votes		426	100
Votes necessary		214	>50

2015 election for Speaker (Regular) – 114th Congress * denotes incumbent
Party	Candidate	Votes	%
Republican	John Boehner* (OH 8)	216	53
Democratic	Nancy Pelosi (CA 12)	164	40
Republican	Dan Webster (FL 10)	12	3
Republican	Louie Gohmert (TX 1)	3	1
Republican	Ted Yoho (FL 3)	2	0
Republican	Jim Jordan (OH 4)	2	0
Republican	Jeff Duncan (SC 3)	1	0
Republican	Rand Paul	1	0
Republican	Colin Powell	1	0
Republican	Trey Gowdy (SC 4)	1	0
Republican	Kevin McCarthy (CA 23)	1	0
Democratic	Jim Cooper (TN 5)	1	0
Democratic	Peter DeFazio (OR 4)	1	0
Republican	Jeff Sessions	1	0
Democratic	John Lewis (GA 5)	1	0
Total votes		408	100
Votes necessary		205	>50

- Boehner received a majority of the votes cast, and thus won the election, but failed to obtain a majority of the full membership (218).

2023 Election Speaker of the House - 118th Congress, Roll Call 523
Party	Candidate	Votes	%
Republican	Jim Jordan	199	46.00
Republican	Steve Scalise	7	1.62
Republican	Kevin McCarthy (CA 20)	5	1.15
Republican	Lee Zeldin	3	0.69
Republican	John Boehner	1	0.23
Republican	Other	6	1.39
Democratic	Hakeem Jeffries (NY 8)	212	48.96
Total votes		433	100
Votes necessary		217	>50

== See also ==
- Revolving door (politics)

== Notes ==
U.S. House of Representatives
Preceded by Buz Lukens	Member of the U.S. House of Representatives from Ohio's 8th congressional district 1991–2015	Succeeded by Warren Davidson
Preceded by William F. Goodling	Chair of the House Education Committee; 2001–2006	Succeeded by Howard McKeon
Preceded by Roy Blunt; Acting	House Majority Leader; 2006–2007	Succeeded by Steny Hoyer
Preceded by Nancy Pelosi	House Minority Leader; 2007–2011	Succeeded by Nancy Pelosi
Party political offices
Preceded by Dick Armey	Chair of the House Republican Conference; 1995–1999	Succeeded by J. C. Watts
Preceded by Roy Blunt; Acting	House Republican Deputy Leader; 2006–2007	Succeeded by Roy Blunt
Preceded by Dennis Hastert	House Republican Leader; 2007–2015	Succeeded by Paul Ryan
Political offices
Preceded by Nancy Pelosi	Speaker of the United States House of Representatives; 2011–2015	Succeeded by Paul Ryan
U.S. order of precedence (ceremonial)
Preceded by Newt Gingrich as Former Speaker of the U.S. House of Representatives	Order of precedence of the United States as Former Speaker of the U.S. House of Representatives	Succeeded by Paul Ryan as Former Speaker of the U.S. House of Representatives
