= Post Office scandal =

Post Office scandal may refer to:

- The Congressional Post Office scandal in the US, concerning corruption (investigated 1991–95)
- The British Post Office scandal, concerning the wrongful prosecution of subpostmasters (began late 1990s)
