= George Lang (Ohio politician) =

American politician (born 1962)

President pro tempore-designate of the Ohio Senate
- Assuming office January 4, 2027
- Succeeding: Bill Reineke

Member of the Ohio Senate from the 4th district
- Incumbent
- Assumed office January 4, 2021
- Preceded by: Bill Coley

Member of the Ohio House of Representatives from the 52nd district
- In office September 13, 2017 – January 1, 2021
- Preceded by: Margaret Conditt
- Succeeded by: Jennifer Gross

Personal details
- Born: March 22, 1962 (age 64)
- Party: Republican
- Spouse: Debbie Lang
- Children: 2
- Education: Southeast Missouri State University

George F. Lang (born March 22, 1962) is an American politician. A Republican, he became the state senator for Ohio's 4th senatorial district in 2021. He was previously the representative for the 52nd District of the Ohio House of Representatives. The district consists of West Chester Township, Liberty Township, Fairfield Township and part of the City of Sharonville, Ohio in Butler County.

== Life and career ==
A resident of West Chester, Ohio, Lang is a graduate of Southeast Missouri State University. He formerly served as a West Chester Township trustee serving from 2003 to 2017. Lang is a member of the Boy Scouts of America.

Lang was appointed to the Ohio House of Representatives in September 2017. He represents the 52nd House District, which includes West Chester Township, Liberty Township, Fairfield Township and part of Sharonville in Butler County.

During Lang's time as a West Chester Township Trustee, the township experienced growth and the introduction of large employers such as AK Steel and General Electric. Total growth is reported at $1.6 billion.

As State Representative, George Lang has stated that he wants to "make Ohio the most business-friendly state in the country."

== Career in the Ohio Senate ==
=== Ohio House of Representatives ===
In 2017, state representative Margaret Conditt unexpectedly announced she was resigning in the middle of her fourth term to spend more time with family, leaving Ohio House Republicans with the task of appointing her replacement. Seven individuals applied for the appointment, including Lang.

Lang was ultimately chosen for the seat and was seated in the House on September 13, 2017. He was reelected in 2018. In the state legislature, Lang served on the following committees: Community and Family Advancement, Criminal Justice, Finance, and Insurance.

After sponsoring a bill in 2018 that passed in the Ohio House but failed in the Senate, in May 2019, he was the co-sponsor of a bill that would ban the ability to tax establishments that don't observe bans on the use of plastic bags, with Lang claiming the bag bans were pushing residents to leave Ohio. It passed the Ohio House of Representatives in December 2019. The bill, House Bill 242, was a temporary one-year ban on the bag bans, or banning of "auxiliary containers." It was signed by Governor Mike DeWine. In June 2021, the Ohio Senate proposed making the ban on bans permanent, with Lang argued it was "pro-business" legislation and that disposable bags were good to combat coronavirus transmission. The proposal was supported by the Ohio Chamber of Commerce, the Ohio Manufacturers Association, and the Ohio Chemistry Technology Council.

During the 2020 coronavirus pandemic, Lang avoided masks and publicly announced he was opposed to the COVID-19 vaccine. In April 2020, he was promoting the Ohio Emergency PPE Makers' Exchange, which was created to connect manufacturers in Ohio with personal protective equipment.

=== Ohio Senate ===
In April 2020, he won over Candice Keller and Lee Wong in a primary for Republicans over Ohio's 4th Senate district, with predictions he would face Democrat Kathy Wyenandt in November 2020, whom he had defeated in 2018. Between July 1, 2019 and June 11, 2020, he spent $450,000 on his campaign, "nearly three times as much as his two opponents combined" for the GOP nomination. As of November 3, 2020, he was leading Wyenandt for the 4th Ohio Senate District seat, with 61.2 percent of the vote while Wyenandt had 38.8.

By January 2021, he was representing Ohio's 4th Senate District. By January 28, 2021, he had said that Larry Householder had opposed his plan to make "Ohio the most business-friendly state in the country," with Lang noting that Householder felt that "you can't put business first (which is) just a fundamental disagreement in philosophy." At the time, Lang owned five businesses. In February 2021 was appointed to the Business First Caucus for the 134th General Assembly as a co-chair.

Lang promotes himself as a staunch fiscal conservative. In June 2021, he stated as Ohio Senator of West Chester that in the Finance Committee his focus would be on budget discussions, but that he ""would review any future legislation through the lens of protecting the 2nd Amendment rights," speaking out in favor of harsher punishments for crime but lessening gun control laws, so as not to make it "tougher on the good guys."

==== Committee Assignements ====
During the 134th General Assembly, Lang was assigned to the following Ohio Senate committees:

- (Vice Chair of) Small Business and Economic Opportunity Committee
- Finance Committee
- Government Oversight and Reform Committee
- Insurance Committee
- General Government Budget Committee

== Controversies ==
Lang caused a controversy in July 2024 when he spoke at a rally for U.S. vice-presidential candidate JD Vance in favor of the election of U.S. presidential candidate Donald Trump and stating that "if we lose this one, it's going to take a civil war to save this country" and that he was glad that people like "Bikers for Trump" were on his side. The remarks were condemned by the Ohio Senate Democratic Caucus as inciting violence, stating "Political violence has been condemned by Republicans and Democrats alike. Inciting violence over an election that hasn't even occurred yet is irresponsible and undemocratic." and the campaign of U.S. Vice-President Kamala Harris issued a call for an apology. George Lang later posted that he regretted his divisive remarks.

In March 2025, George Lang made divisive statements at a school board meeting. Lang stated that it costs too much to educate disabled children and implied that the reason for a child having a disability was because they did not come from loving homes. These statements drew outrage from parents, educators, and advocates.

== Personal life ==
He and his wife Debbie have two daughters, Amy and Alicia.

Ohio Senate
Preceded by Bill Reineke	President pro tempore of the Ohio Senate; Taking office 2027	Designate
