= Gary Cates =

Republican politician

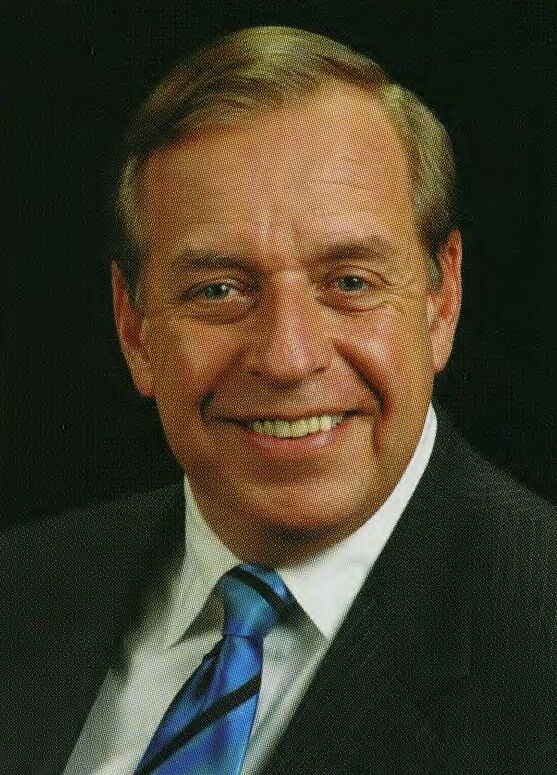

Member of the Ohio Senate from the 4th district
- In office January 3, 2005 – May 23, 2011
- Preceded by: Scott Nein
- Succeeded by: Bill Coley

Member of the Ohio House of Representatives from the 55th district
- In office October 5, 1995 – December 31, 2004
- Preceded by: Scott Nein
- Succeeded by: Bill Coley

Personal details
- Born: December 27, 1955 (age 70) Petersburg, Virginia
- Party: Republican
- Spouse: Jill Cates
- Children: Brenton Cates; Andrew Cates
- Education: Virginia Tech; University of Dayton
- Profession: Steel Applications Engineer

Gary Cates (born December 27, 1955) is a Republican politician who served in the Ohio General Assembly. He was a member of the Ohio House of Representatives from 1995 to 2004, and a member of the Ohio Senate from 2005 to 2011.

== Life and career ==
A graduate of Virginia Tech and the University of Dayton, Cates began his political career as a Union Township Trustee from 1990 to 1995. When Representative Scott Nein resigned from the Ohio House of Representatives to take a seat in the Ohio Senate late in 1995, Cates was appointed to fill the remainder of his term.

A reliably Republican district, Cates faced no opposition in the 1996 primary and beat Kendall L. Mays handily in the 1996 election. He went on to win easily against opponents in 1998 and 2000, and ran unopposed in 2002. In 2001, Cates was elected by his peers to serve in as Speaker Pro Tempore of the House, the second highest position under Speaker of the House Larry Householder. He served in this capacity for both the 124th General Assembly and the 125th General Assembly.

== Ohio Senate ==
With incumbent Senator Scott Nein unable to run for the Senate again because of term limits, Cates, along with Representative Greg Jolivette and County Commissioner Courtney Combs were seen as potential successors. Midway through 2003, the Butler County Republican party sought to create a proposal that would help to avoid a primary. It focused on Jolivette and Combs switching offices, therefore allowing Cates to seal the nomination for the Senate seat. However, this did not work out. Jolivette decided to seek a fourth term in the House, and Combs decided to seek the Senate seat. Cates faced no opposition for his bid. Therefore, he had a clear path to the Senate in a staunchly Republican district. Against Democrat Melvin A. Smith in the general election, Cates won by about 48,000 votes.

Cates, up for reelection in 2008, was again a strong favorite against Democratic challenger Kathryn Bridgman. He won a second term by approximately 35,000 votes.

On May 5, 2011, Ohio Governor John Kasich announced that he would be appointing Cates as the senior vice chancellor for the division of Innovation and Enterprise Development with the Ohio Board of Regents. Cates accepted, and on May 23, 2011, resigned from the Senate. He was succeeded by Bill Coley, who will serve out the remainder of Cates' term before running for a full term in 2012.
