= Gang of Seven =

Political faction in the 102nd U.S. Congress

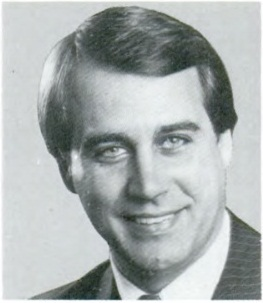
John Boehner

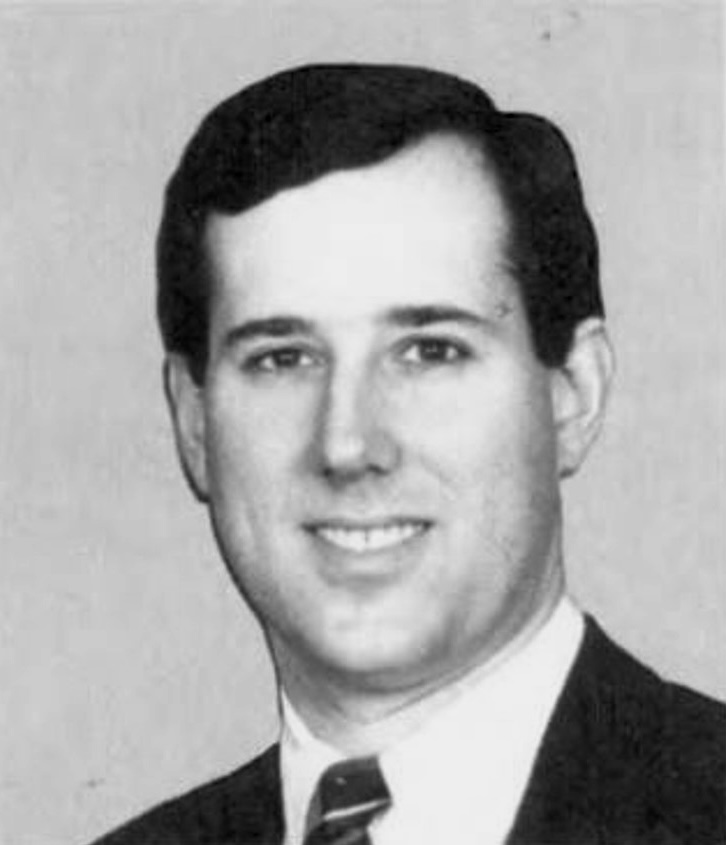
Rick Santorum

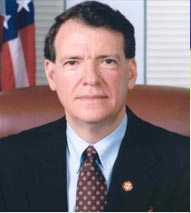
Charles Taylor

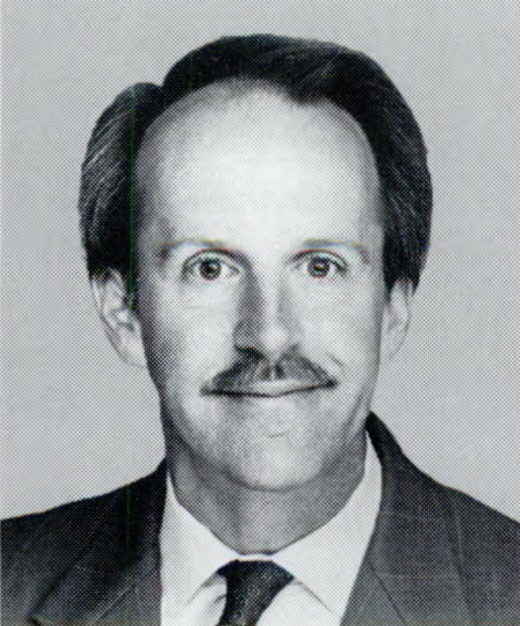
Frank Riggs

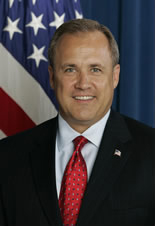
Jim Nussle

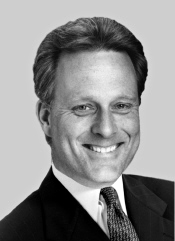
Scott Klug

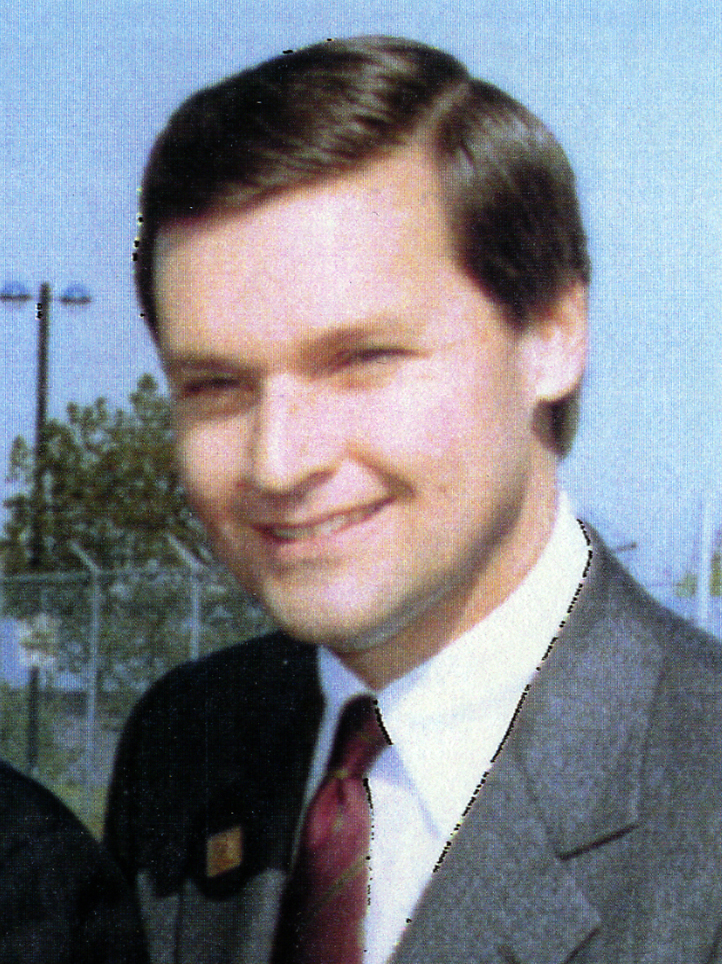
John Doolittle

The Gang of Seven refers to a group of freshmen Republican U.S. Representatives, elected to serve in the 102nd Congress in 1990. The group loudly condemned the House banking scandal and the Congressional Post Office scandal, forcing the congressional leadership to address the issues by ensuring the incidents stayed in the media and public eye. The group also criticized other Congressional perks, such as congressional subsidies for the Capitol Barbershop and Senate Restaurant.

Two members of this group, Jim Nussle and John Boehner, were also key drafters of the Contract with America, which along with the banking and post office scandals helped the Republicans take control of the House in the 1994 elections.

== Primary activities ==
The House banking scandal broke in early 1992, when it was revealed that the United States House of Representatives allowed members to overdraw their House checking accounts without risk of being penalized by the House bank (actually a clearinghouse). The House banking scandal ultimately involved more than 450 representatives, most of whom did not break any laws. Twenty-two congressmen and -women were singled out by the House Ethics Committee for leaving their checking accounts overdrawn for at least eight months out of a sample of 39 months.

The Congressional Post Office scandal refers to the discovery of corruption among various Congressional Post Office employees and members of the United States House of Representatives, investigated from 1991–1995, climaxing in the conviction of House Ways and Means Committee chairman Dan Rostenkowski (D-IL). The Republican charges were largely ignored until July 1993, when Congressional Postmaster Robert Rota pleaded guilty to three criminal charges, implicating Representatives Dan Rostenkowski (D-IL) and Joe Kolter (D-PA). They were accused of heading a conspiracy to launder Post Office money through stamps and postal vouchers. Rostenkowski was convicted and sentenced to 18 months in prison, in 1995.

== Members ==
The seven Representatives were:

Overview of members
Photo	Member	Born	Died	District	In office	Offices held
	John Boehner	November 17, 1949 (age 76); Reading, Ohio		Ohio 8	1991–2015	Chair of House Republican Conference (1995–1999); Chair, Education Committee (2001–2006); Majority Leader (2006–2007); Minority Leader (2007–2011); 53rd Speaker of the House (2011–2015)
	Rick Santorum	May 10, 1958 (age 68); Winchester, Virginia		Pennsylvania 18	1991–1995	U.S. Senator (1995–2007); Chair of Senate Republican Conference (2001–2007)
	Charles Taylor	January 23, 1941 (age 85); Brevard, North Carolina		North Carolina 11	1991–2007	None
	Frank Riggs	September 5, 1950; Louisville, Kentucky	December 20, 2023 (aged 73); Arizona	California 1	1991–1993, 1995–1999	None
	Jim Nussle	June 27, 1960 (age 66); Des Moines, Iowa		Iowa 2 (1991–2003); Iowa 1 (2003–2007)	1991–2007	Chair, Budget Committee (2001–2007); OMB Director (2007–2009)
	Scott Klug	January 16, 1953 (age 73); Milwaukee, Wisconsin		Wisconsin 2	1991–1999	None
	John Doolittle	October 30, 1950 (age 75); Glendale, California		California 14 (1991–1993); California 4 (1993–2009)	1991–2009	Secretary of House Republican Conference (2003–2007)

== Subsequent careers ==
By 2015, none of the 'Gang' remained in Congress, following the retirement of Boehner. One of the seven successfully ran for higher office, one was defeated for re-election, and five retired.

Rick Santorum was once considered a rising star in the Republican Party. He was the first of the Gang of Seven to run for higher office, and the only one who was successful, becoming the junior U.S. senator from Pennsylvania in the Republican landslide of 1994. Santorum served two terms in the Senate and rose to the level of Senate Republican Conference chairman before being defeated by State Treasurer Bob Casey in 2006. He ran for the Republican nomination for president in 2012, where he did not win the nomination, and later ran in the 2016 Republican primary.

Charles Taylor remained in the House for eight terms. He was defeated in 2006, losing to former NFL quarterback Heath Shuler.

Two retired from the House to run for higher office. Frank Riggs left his House seat after three terms in 1998 to run unsuccessfully for the Republican nomination to the U.S. Senate seat held by Barbara Boxer. Jim Nussle retired in 2006 after eight terms to run for the open Iowa governor's seat but lost to Democratic candidate Chet Culver. Nussle had served previously as chairman of the House Budget Committee and was then selected to serve as director of the Office of Management and Budget (OMB) under President George W. Bush.

Klug, Doolittle, and Boehner have returned to private life. Scott Klug chose to keep his initial campaign promise of only serving four terms and to refocus on his business. John Doolittle's reputation was tainted by involvement in the Jack Abramoff scandal and retired at the end of his ninth term in 2008. John Boehner became the House Majority Leader in 2006, then House Minority Leader in 2007 (Note: Because Democrats won majority control in the 2006 elections.) and then Speaker in 2011 when Republicans won back majority control. He resigned from the position of Speaker October 31, 2015.
