= Shawn Webster =

American politician

Member of the Ohio House of Representatives from the 53rd district
- In office January 3, 2001 – December 31, 2008
- Preceded by: Gene Krebs
- Succeeded by: Timothy Derickson

Personal details
- Born: March 3, 1949 (age 77) Cincinnati, Ohio, U.S.
- Party: Republican
- Education: Ohio State University
- Profession: Veterinarian

Shawn Webster (born March 3, 1949) is a former Republican member of the Ohio House of Representatives, who represented the 53rd District from 2001 to 2008.

== Life and career ==
Webster graduated from the Ohio State University with a degree in veterinary medicine. He has been a veterinarian in the Butler County area for over thirty years. Webster is married with three children. Prior to his tenure in the Ohio House, Webster served on the Ross Local School Board for a number of years.

== Ohio House of Representatives ==
With Representative Gene Krebs term limited, Webster was one of three Republicans who sought to succeed him in the Ohio House of Representatives. He secured the nomination, and won the general election with 61.1% of the vote. He won reelection in 2002 with 64.45%, in 2004 with 65.83%, and 2006 with 57.46%.

Webster served as the Chairman of the Higher Education Subcommittee in the Ohio 126th General Assembly.

In 2008, Webster was unable to run again due to term limits. He was succeeded by Timothy Derickson, and has since retired from politics.
