= Scott Klug =

American politician (born 1953)

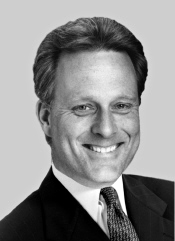

Member of the U.S. House of Representatives from Wisconsin's 2nd district
- In office January 3, 1991 – January 3, 1999
- Preceded by: Robert Kastenmeier
- Succeeded by: Tammy Baldwin

Personal details
- Born: Scott Leo Klug; January 16, 1953 (age 73) Milwaukee, Wisconsin, U.S.
- Party: Republican
- Spouse: Theresa Summers
- Children: 3
- Education: Lawrence University (BA); Northwestern University (MA); University of Wisconsin, Madison (MBA)

Scott Leo Klug (born January 16, 1953) is an American lobbyist, author, and businessman, as well as a former politician and television reporter. From 1991 to 1999, he was a Republican member of the United States House of Representatives from Wisconsin, representing Wisconsin's 2nd congressional district.

== Early life, education and career ==
Klug grew up in West Allis and Wauwatosa, both Milwaukee-area suburbs. He attended Marquette University High School, a Roman Catholic boys school, and then Lawrence University, graduating with a degree in history in 1975. The following year he received a master's degree in journalism from Northwestern University. He later received an M.B.A. from the University of Wisconsin–Madison in 1990. For 14 years, Klug was a television journalist, serving as anchor and reporter for various stations in Seattle, Washington, Madison, Wisconsin, and Washington, D.C.

== U.S. Congress ==
Klug was first elected to the 102nd Congress in 1990, defeating, in a surprise upset, 16 term incumbent Robert Kastenmeier, with 53% of the vote. He won re-election in 1992 with 63% of the vote, in 1994 with 69% of the vote, and in 1996 with 57% of the vote.

While in office, Klug was a member of the House Energy and Commerce Committee. In his first term, he gained national attention as one of the members of the Republican Gang of Seven. He also opposed the George H. W. Bush administration by supporting abortion rights and family leave.

While in Congress, Klug opposed the federal drinking age, saying alcohol regulation should be a matter left to individual states, and advocated the revocation of the 1984 National Minimum Drinking Age Act.

At the urging of Republican leadership under Newt Gingrich, Klug presented a resolution stating that the House would not support continuing resolutions to keep government funding; this led to the United States federal government shutdown of 1995 and 1996.

Klug did not run for re-election in 1998, and his term expired on January 3, 1999. Democrat Tammy Baldwin ran for Congress in the 2nd district and subsequently won his seat.

== Post-Congressional career ==
Klug currently serves as director of public affairs for Foley & Lardner, a Wisconsin-based law firm, and represents clients in Washington and various state capitals.

In 2013, he authored The Alliance, a mystery novel about religion and antiquities.

In 2007, Klug co-chaired Rudy Giuliani's presidential campaign in Wisconsin along with former U.S. Sen. Bob Kasten and former State Sen. Cathy Stepp. On January 30, 2008, Giuliani dropped out of the race.

In August 1998, Klug, as head of Barking Sands Media, purchased Wisconsin Trails, a travel magazine. He was the CEO of Trails Media Group, based in Black Earth, Wisconsin, until 2007 when the company was sold to the Milwaukee Journal Sentinel and moved to Milwaukee, Wisconsin.

== Personal life ==
Klug is a resident of Madison, Wisconsin with his wife, Theresa Summers Klug. The couple has three children.

U.S. House of Representatives
Preceded by Robert Kastenmeier	Member of the U.S. House of Representatives from Wisconsin's 2nd congressional district 1991–1999	Succeeded by Tammy Baldwin
U.S. order of precedence (ceremonial)
Preceded by Bruce Braley as Former U.S. Representative	Order of precedence of the United States as Former U.S. Representative	Succeeded by Mark Andrew Green as Former U.S. Representative
