= Warren Davidson =

American politician (born 1970)

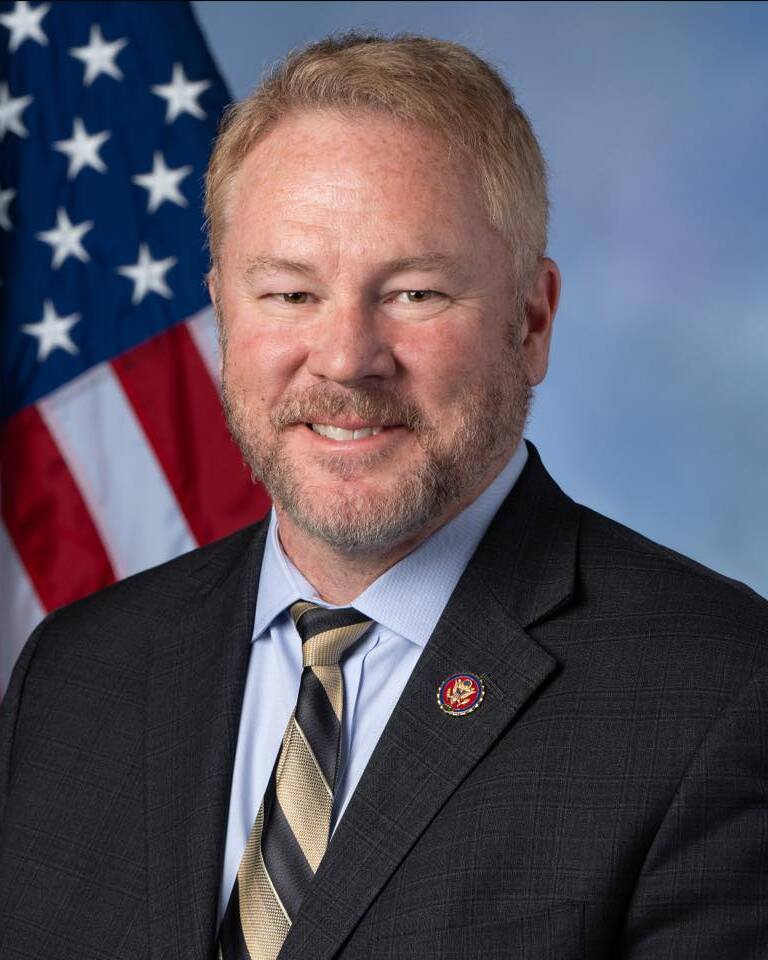
- Official portrait, c. 2024

Member of the U.S. House of Representatives from Ohio's 8th district
- Incumbent
- Assumed office June 7, 2016 (Note: Davidson's official service begins on the date of the special election, while he was not sworn in until June 9, 2016.)
- Preceded by: John Boehner

Personal details
- Born: Warren Earl Davidson; March 1, 1970 (age 56) Sidney, Ohio, U.S.
- Party: Republican
- Spouse: Lisa Davidson (m. 1995)
- Children: 2
- Education: United States Military Academy (BS); University of Notre Dame (MBA)
- Website: House website Campaign website

Military service
- Allegiance: United States
- Branch/service: United States Army
- Years of service: 1988–2000
- Unit: 3rd Infantry Division; 75th Ranger Regiment; 101st Airborne Division; 3rd Infantry Regiment
- Davidson's voice Davidson honoring Master Sergeant Joseph Kapacziewski; Recorded January 31, 2023

Warren Earl Davidson (born March 1, 1970) is an American politician and former military officer serving as the U.S. representative for Ohio's 8th congressional district since 2016. The district includes a swath of suburban and exurban territory between Cincinnati and Dayton. He is a member of the Republican Party.

Davidson was first elected to Congress in a 2016 special election after incumbent Republican and Speaker of the House John Boehner resigned.

== Personal life ==
Davidson was born and raised in Sidney, Ohio, graduating from Sidney High School in 1988.

Davidson met his wife, Lisa, in 1991 while he was entering West Point and she was serving as a missionary setting up Backyard Bible Clubs for Ohio churches. They married in 1995 and have two children. They reside in Troy, a city near Dayton.

== Military career ==
=== Assignments ===
Davidson enlisted in the Army after graduating from high school in 1988. After training, he was stationed in Germany with the 3rd Infantry Division, and witnessed the fall of the Berlin Wall. Soon thereafter he attended the United States Military Academy, graduating in 1995. He left with an officers' commission and a degree in American history, minoring in mechanical engineering. After West Point, he went to Army Ranger School and ROP indoctrination in 1996, subsequently spending time in the elite 75th Ranger Regiment, 101st Airborne Division and The Old Guard. He separated honorably from the Army in 2000.

Davidson returned to serve in a new capacity at his alma mater when he was appointed to the 2020 United States Military Academy Board of Visitors.

=== Awards and decorations ===
- Expert Infantryman Badge
- Army Ranger Tab

== Post-military career ==
Upon separation from the Army, Davidson attended the University of Notre Dame for his MBA. After graduate school, he returned to Ohio to help his father run the family business, West Troy Tool & Machine. Davidson purchased the business from his father in 2005. In 2014 Davidson and a business partner combined West Troy with another manufacturing group, RK Metals, with Davidson becoming managing director of RK Metals and president of West Troy. They renamed the combined business Integral Manufacturing in 2015. Davidson ceased affiliation with the company upon taking office in 2016, but continues to percentage lease facilities to Integral and a neighboring company.

During his time in manufacturing, Davidson served as chairman of the Dayton Region Manufacturers Association, an industry trade group. From 2004 to 2005, he served on the Concord Township, Ohio, Board of Trustees.

== U.S. House of Representatives ==
=== Elections ===
==== 2016 special ====
In October 2015, facing pressure from the House Freedom Caucus, House Speaker John Boehner stepped down as speaker, and resigned from his House seat. Davidson then ran in a special election for the balance of Boehner’s 13th term, recruited heavily by fellow Ohio Congressman Jim Jordan. Davidson won the 15-way primary, all but guaranteeing his victory in the heavily Republican district's special election on June 7. He was sworn in on June 9.

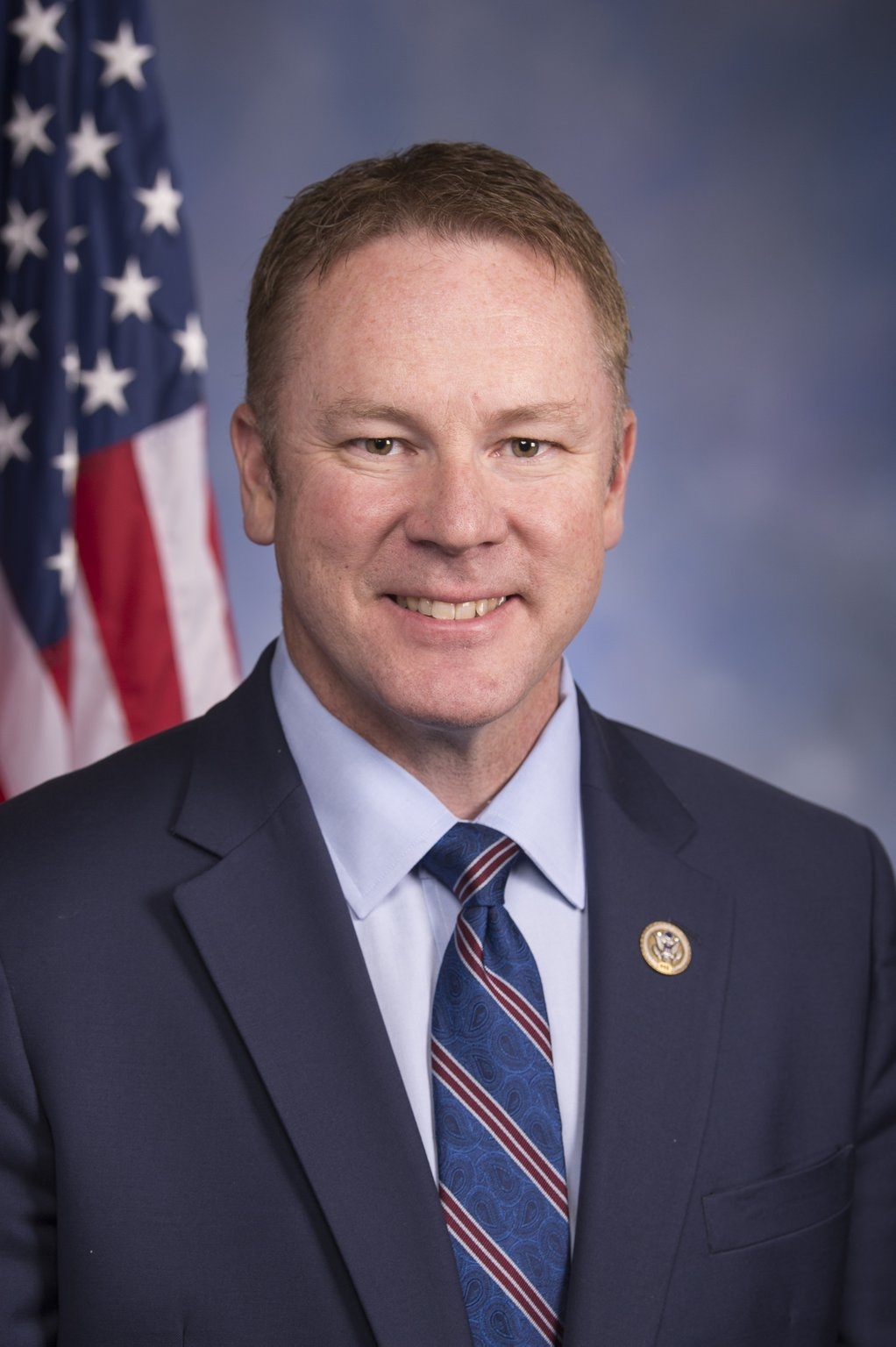
Davidson during the 115th United States Congress (c. 2017)

==== 2016 regular ====
Davidson defeated Democratic nominee Steven Fought for a full term, 68.7% to 27.0%.

==== 2018 ====
Davidson defeated Democratic nominee Vanessa Enoch, 66.6% to 33.4%.

==== 2020 ====
Davidson defeated Enoch again with 69% of the vote.

=== Tenure ===
Upon election, Davidson was asked to join the House Freedom Caucus, an invitation he accepted.

Davidson is a member of the budget and spending task force on the Republican Study Committee.

In July 2020, Davidson founded the Sound Money Caucus, a caucus focused on maintaining financial stability and Dollar hegemony. He serves as its chair.

In 2019, Davidson made an unsuccessful bid for chair of the Freedom Caucus after Representative Mark Meadows vacated the position, later withdrawing in favor of Andy Biggs. Davidson served as the caucus's policy chair from October 2019 until his expulsion in July 2024.

On January 7, 2021, Davidson objected to the certification of electors in the 2020 US presidential election, alleging widespread voter fraud.

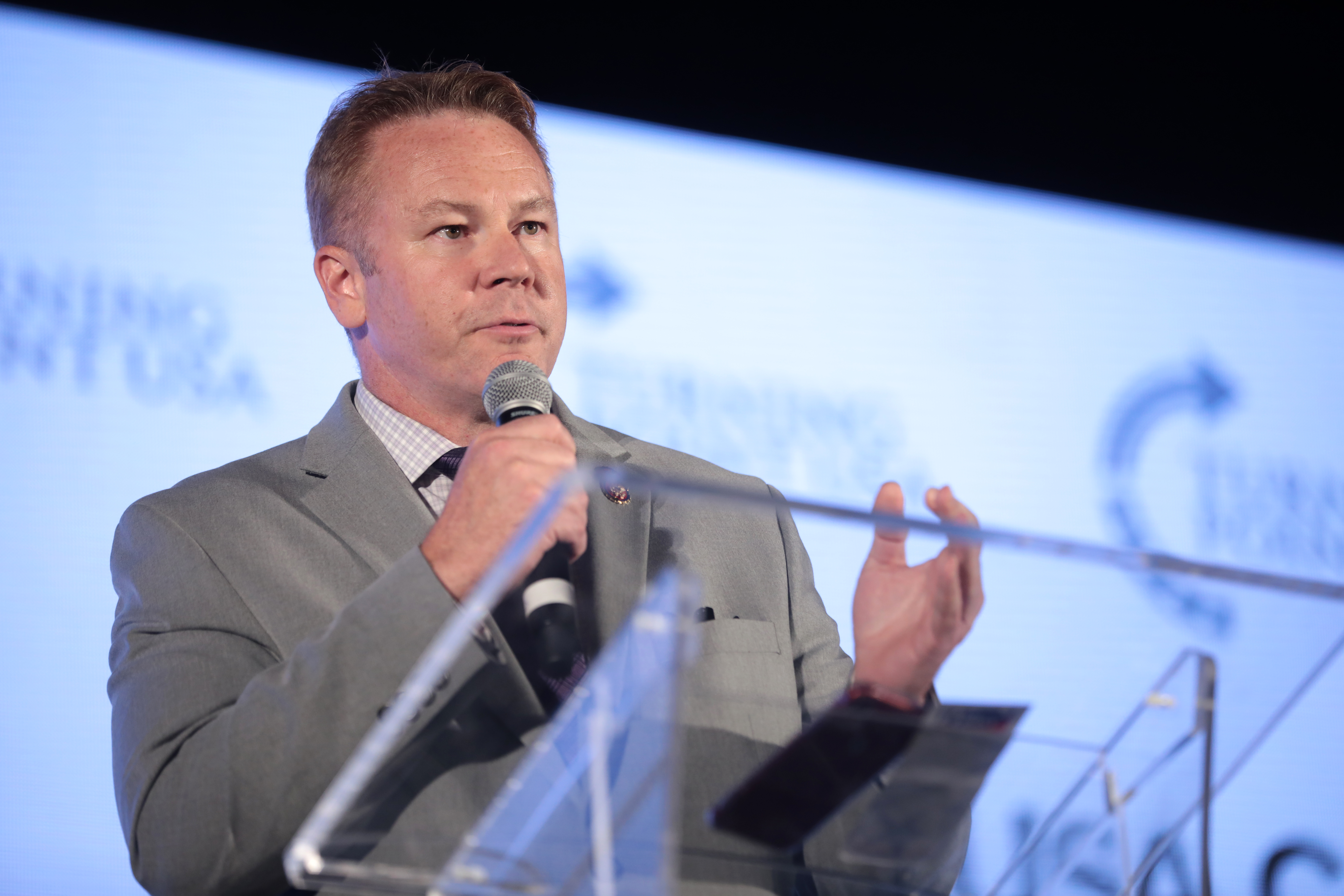
Warren Davidson speaking with attendees at the 2019 Teen Student Action Summit hosted by Turning Point USA

In September 2021, nonprofit group Campaign Legal Center filed an ethics complaint against Davidson with the Office of Congressional Ethics, claiming that Davidson appeared to have violated the Stop Trading on Congressional Knowledge (STOCK) Act of 2012, a federal transparency and conflict-of-interest law, by failing to properly disclose a sale of stock in Workhorse Group worth between $50,000 and $100,000 that he made in 2020. In response, a spokesperson for Davidson claimed that the proper financial disclosure form had been filed on time but that the House Clerk's website had failed to publish it.

In January 2022, Davidson faced backlash from Jewish groups after comparing a Washington, D.C. city ordinance requiring display of photo identification and proof of COVID-19 vaccination to enter businesses to the Holocaust.

Davidson has consistently opposed large-scale aid packages for Ukraine, including a $39.8 billion measure in May 2022. He has conditioned his support for future funding on the Biden administration providing a "clear, strategic mission," stating that he opposes a "blank check" for the conflict. On March 19, 2024, Davidson voted "nay" to House Resolution 149 Condemning the illegal abduction and forcible transfer of children from Ukraine to the Russian Federation. He was one of nine Republicans to do so.

In March 2026, Davidson broke with the majority of his party to vote in favor of a War Powers Resolution intended to restrain President Donald Trump's military operations against Iran.

=== Committee assignments ===
- United States House Committee on Financial Services
  - Subcommittee on Monetary Policy and Trade
  - Subcommittee on Capital Markets, Securities, and Investment

=== Caucus memberships ===
- Freedom Caucus
- Sound Money Caucus
- Republican Study Committee
- Army Caucus
- Congressional Blockchain Caucus
- Congressional Motorcycle Caucus
- Liberty Caucus
- Second Amendment Caucus
- Steel Caucus
- Values Action Team
- Warrior Caucus

== Political positions ==
=== Abortion ===
Davidson is staunchly anti-abortion except to save the mother's life. On August 12, 2020, he and Senator Mike Braun co-wrote a letter to Treasury Secretary Steve Mnuchin urging him to direct the IRS not to treat premiums for health insurance that covers abortions as medical care, writing, "in all but the most extreme circumstances, abortion is an elective procedure."

On June 26, 2022, when asked by Pamela Brown on CNN Newsroom whether he was okay with a child rape victim carrying out a pregnancy, he said, "It's a compromise. Like I say, rape is raised as an objection and the Heartbeat Bill already deals with that and it's hard to conceive of somebody who doesn't know they were raped for two months."

=== Spending ===
Davidson has voted against numerous spending bills including disaster relief for Puerto Rico. He also voted against raising the debt limit to provide Hurricane Harvey relief.

Davidson was one of two Republicans to vote against the One Big Beautiful Bill Act due to national debt concerns on its first passage vote, but voted in favor of the bill on its final vote after amendments by the United States Senate.

=== U.S. Capitol Police ===
In June 2021, Davidson was 1 of 21 House Republicans to vote against a resolution to give the Congressional Gold Medal to police officers who defended the U.S. Capitol on January 6.

=== Foreign policy and the military ===
Davidson and Jim Jordan were the only members of Ohio's congressional delegation and two of 60 members of Congress to vote against a bipartisan resolution condemning President Donald Trump's unilateral withdrawal of U.S. military forces from Syria, which passed the House 354–60 in October 2019. Davidson justified the position in an op-ed that called for an outright rejection of neoconservative foreign policy, in which he wrote, "the neoconservative consensus has left America less free, less safe, and burdened by unprecedented debt." He also urged NATO to stipulate that any actions Turkey took against groups like the Kurds in response to U.S. withdrawal should be treated as genocide and be grounds for removal as a treaty signatory.

Davidson voted against the National Defense Authorization Act for Fiscal Year 2021, citing, among other things, "funding for military activity in Afghanistan with no change in strategy or plan to withdraw troops".

In June 2021, Davidson was one of 49 House Republicans to vote to repeal the AUMF against Iraq.

In 2023, Davidson voted to provide Israel with support following the October 7 attacks.

=== Health care ===
Davidson supports Republican efforts to repeal and replace the Affordable Care Act.

=== Intelligence and surveillance activities ===
Davidson supports curtailing many of the broad signals intelligence permissions granted in the wake of the September 11 attacks, which he has called an "extralegal spying regime" of "vague laws and lax protections". He has worked to orchestrate several major attempts to reform the laws in recent years.

The first major attempt at reform came in January 2020 when Davidson co-sponsored H.R. 5675, The Safeguarding Americans' Private Records Act (SAPRA) alongside the notably unusual coalition of Progressive Caucus Democrats like Pramila Jayapal and Freedom Caucus Republicans like Matt Gaetz. The bill aimed at significant reforms, including new transparency of FISA Court decisions and ensuring 4th amendment constraints on "tangible things" requests subsequent to the decision in Carpenter v. United States. Efforts stalled after House Judiciary Committee Chairman Jerry Nadler canceled markup on the bill at the request of House Intelligence Committee Chairman Adam Schiff.

Another came during debate over reauthorization of the Foreign Intelligence Surveillance Act (FISA), when Davidson worked with Representative Zoe Lofgren to introduce the Lofgren-Davidson Amendment. The amendment was to serve as an outright prohibition on warrantless search of American's internet activities by the Intelligence Community via Section 215 of FISA empowered by the USA FREEDOM Act (aka the Library Records provision). Reauthorization of the soon-to-expire Section 215 concerned a set of provisions known informally as the “business records” power, the “call detail records” authority, the “roving wiretaps” provision, and the never-used “lone wolf” amendment. Among other reforms, the new language would have constrained these powers by creating an affirmative burden on the government to be absolutely sure the target in question is not a U.S. person before obtaining internet records, and make unlawful the incidental collection of U.S. persons' data via selection of all web traffic data for a particular video, search query, or webpage. In addition, if an order could result in a U.S. person's data, it would be unlawful without a warrant narrowly tailored to a specific subject. It also included a provision to eliminate the lone wolf amendment. The proposal mirrored a companion Senate amendment by Senators Ron Wyden and Steve Daines, which had narrowly failed in the Senate. Davidson said he would support reauthorization of FISA so long as the amendment was included.

After House Intelligence Committee chair Adam Schiff made a statement to the New York Times suggesting that the Lofgren-Davidson amendment would not completely eliminate warrantless surveillance, Davidson and Wyden quickly abandoned support of the amendment over fears that the agreement reached between Lofgren and Schiff over the weekend had betrayed much of the intent of the amendment with omissions and loopholes to be interpreted maliciously by the secretive FISA Court. Both went on to oppose the amendment and underlying reauthorization bill, with Davidson saying, "this is Representative Schiff and intelligence hawks working overtime to protect the surveillance state status quo." The entire bill was later pulled by Speaker Pelosi after Trump indicated he would veto and moderate Republicans indicated opposition. Barring further action Section 215 powers lie dormant, as authority expired March 15, 2020.

After Attorney General William Barr tried to suggest that FISA could be reauthorized with assurances the Justice Department would fix abuses through administrative rulemaking, Davidson pushed back against suggestions that any agency decisions could stand in for crucial legislative reform.

Davidson cited compromises of "Americans’ privacy in the name of fighting terror" as a reason for his vote against the National Defense Authorization Act for Fiscal Year 2021.

== Electoral history ==
Ohio's 8th Congressional District special election, 2016
Party	Candidate	Votes	%
Republican	Warren Davidson	21,618	76.76
Democratic	Corey Foister	5,937	21.08
Green	James J. Condit, Jr.	607	2.16
Total votes		28,236	100.00
Republican hold			

Ohio's 8th Congressional District election, 2016
Party	Candidate	Votes	%
Republican	Warren Davidson (Incumbent)	223,833	68.76
Democratic	Steven Fought	87,794	26.97
Green	Derrick James Hendricks	13,879	4.26
Total votes		325,506	100.00
Republican hold			

Ohio's 8th Congressional District election, 2018
Party	Candidate	Votes	%
Republican	Warren Davidson (incumbent)	173,852	66.6
Democratic	Vanessa Enoch	87,281	33.4
Total votes		261,133	100.0
Republican hold			

Ohio's 8th Congressional District election, 2020
Party	Candidate	Votes	%
Republican	Warren Davidson (incumbent)	246,276	69.0
Democratic	Vanessa Enoch	110,766	31.0
Total votes		357,042	100.0
Republican hold			

Ohio's 8th Congressional District election, 2022
Party	Candidate	Votes	%
Republican	Warren Davidson (incumbent)	180,287	64.6
Democratic	Vanessa Enoch	98,629	35.4
Total votes		278,916	100.0
Republican hold			

Ohio's 8th Congressional District election, 2024
Party	Candidate	Votes	%
Republican	Warren Davidson (incumbent)	237,503	62.81%
Democratic	Vanessa Enoch	140,625	37.19%
Total votes		378,128	100
Republican hold			

U.S. House of Representatives
Preceded by John Boehner	Member of the U.S. House of Representatives from Ohio's 8th congressional district 2016–present	Incumbent
U.S. order of precedence (ceremonial)
Preceded by Darin LaHood	United States representatives by seniority 150th	Succeeded by James Comer
