= Ohio's 4th senatorial district =

American legislative district

Ohio's 4th State Senate district
Senator
George Lang; R–West Chester Township
- Demographics: 74.6% White; 11.3% Black; 6.7% Hispanic; 5.1% Asian; 2.3% Native American; 0.2% Hawaiian/Pacific Islander
- Population (2020) • Voting age • Citizens of voting age: 368,937; 283,262; 264,486

Ohio's 4th senatorial district (after the 2023 redistricting) now still consists of Butler County with the exceptions of Milford and Wayne Townships. It is composed of Ohio House Districts of 45, 46 and 47.

The current Ohio Senator is Republican George Lang.

== Historically ==
Before the 2023 redistricting, Ohio's 4th senatorial district was based in southwestern Ohio and now consists of most of Butler County (with the exception of Milford and Wayne Townships). It encompasses Ohio House of Representatives districts 51, 52 and 53. It has a Cook PVI of R+14.

== List of senators ==
Senator	Party	Term	Notes
Walter E. Powell	Republican	January 3, 1967 – January 2, 1971	Powell was elected to the United States Congress in 1970.
Donald E. "Buz" Lukens	Republican	January 3, 1971 – January 2, 1987	Lukens was elected to the United States Congress in 1986.
Barry Levey	Republican	January 4, 1987 – June 30, 1995	Levey retired prior to the expiration of his term.
Scott Nein	Republican	July 11, 1995 – December 31, 2004	Nein was term limited.
Gary Cates	Republican	January 3, 2005 – May 22, 2011	Cates resigned to become an administrator for the Ohio Board of Regents.
Bill Coley	Republican	May 23, 2011 – December 31, 2020	Coley was term limited.
George Lang	Republican	January 4, 2021 – present	Incumbent
