= Gene Krebs =

American politician

Member of the Ohio House of Representatives from the 60th district
- In office January 3, 1993-December 31, 2000
- Preceded by: District Relocated
- Succeeded by: Shawn Webster

Personal details
- Party: Republican

Eugene "Gene" Krebs was a member of the Ohio House of Representatives from 1993 to 2000. His district consisted of a portion of Butler County, Ohio. He was succeeded by Shawn Webster. Krebs was also County Commissioner of Preble County, Ohio for four years.

Krebs previously served as a collegiate fencing coach. For his dedication to the sport, the Gene Krebs Memorial Tournament was held in Krebs' honor at Miami University, on April 9, 2022, and again on April 1, 2023. Despite the "memorial" verbiage, Krebs is still a living person and was in attendance.
