= Scott Nein =

American politician

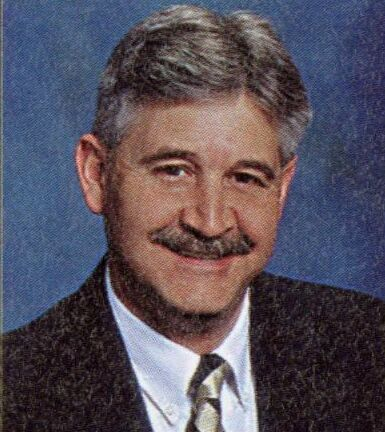

Member of the Ohio Senate from the 4th district
- In office July 11, 1995 – December 31, 2004
- Preceded by: Barry Levey
- Succeeded by: Gary Cates

Member of the Ohio House of Representatives from the 58th district
- In office January 3, 1991 – July 11, 1995
- Preceded by: John Boehner
- Succeeded by: Gary Cates

Personal details
- Born: April 13, 1951
- Died: August 19, 2023 (aged 72)
- Party: Republican
- Children: Jason, Beckett, Brody, Courtney
- Education: Bowling Green State University

Scott R. Nein of Middletown, Ohio, (April 13, 1951 – August 19, 2023) was an American politician of the Republican party, who formerly served in the Ohio General Assembly.

== Political career ==
Nein was encouraged by John Boehner to run for the Ohio House of Representatives to succeed him in 1990. He did so and won the seat. He won reelection in 1992 and 1994. By his third term Nein was serving as majority floor leader of the House.

When Senator Barry Levey resigned from the Ohio Senate in 1995, Nein was appointed to replace him. He resigned his seat in the House and took the seat in the Senate in the same day. He went on to win election to the seat in 1996 for a full term. He again won election in 2000.

== Post-political career ==
Following his time in elected office, Nein was made CEO of the Ohio Association of Insurance Agents/Independent Insurance Agents of Ohio.
