= Tim Derickson =

American politician

Member of the Ohio House of Representatives from the 33rd district
- In office January 5, 2009 – August 21, 2016
- Preceded by: Shawn Webster
- Succeeded by: Candice Keller

Personal details
- Born: March 20, 1960 (age 66) Cincinnati, Ohio, U.S.
- Party: Republican
- Spouse: Kelly Derickson
- Education: Clark State College; Miami University

Timothy Derickson (born March 20, 1960) is the former state representative for the 53rd District of the Ohio House of Representatives, as well as a former Hanover Township Trustee.

== Career ==
Derickson was born on March 20, 1960, in Cincinnati, Ohio, and after graduation from Clark State University and Miami University, Derickson worked as a health care administrator before starting Colonial Woods Furniture and Indian Ridge Golf Course on land that was previously his family's dairy farm. The former Hanover Township trustee is also a Coldwell Banker realtor. In April 2017, Derickson was named assistant director at the Ohio Department of Agriculture (ODA). During a portion of his service with ODA, he served as interim director. In September 2020, JobsOhio announced the hiring of Tim Derickson, a longtime agribusiness entrepreneur and former state legislator, as its new Senior Director of Food and Agribusiness. In his new role, Derickson oversees a sector that includes hundreds of companies that cultivate, process, package, distribute and market foods and beverages enjoyed around the world.

== Ohio House of Representatives ==
With incumbent Shawn Webster unable to run again due to term limits, Derickson was one of three who sought to replace him. However, in a razor-thin primary victory, Derickson won the Republican nomination by 54 votes. He faced Democrat Rocky Day in the general election, and won with 65.85% of the electorate. In his 2010 reelection campaign Derickson, unopposed in the primary, defeated Democrat James Shew with 70.19 of the electorate to take second term.

On May 10, 2011, Derickson announced that he would seek a seat in the Ohio Senate, following Gary Cates resignation. However, the seat ultimately went to Bill Coley. Derickson won a third term in 2012 with 60.91% of the vote.

On August 15, 2016, Derickson was selected by the Ohio Board of Embalmers and Funeral Directors to lead the state funeral board. Derickson, who was term-limited and could not seek reelection, subsequently announced his resignation from the Ohio House effective August 22, 2016.

=== Committee assignments ===
- Finance: Agriculture & Development Sub.--Chair
- Education
- Finance & Appropriations
- Manufacturing & Workforce Development

== Electoral history ==
Ohio House of Representatives 53rd District
Year	Democrat	Votes	Pct	Republican	Votes	Pct
2012	Suzi Rubin	17,836	39.01%	Tim Derickson	27,797	60.99%
2010	JC Shew	10,446	29.45%	Tim Derickson	25,030	70.55%
2008	Rocky Day	15,091	34.24%	Tim Derickson	28,988	65.76%

== Personal life ==
Derickson and his wife Kelly live in Oxford, Ohio, with their two children, Katie (who is married to Dave Noble) and Matt. Derickson has three grandchildren.
