= House banking scandal =

Scandal relating to overdrawn checking accounts in the U.S. House of Representatives

The House banking scandal broke in early 1992, when it was revealed that the US House of Representatives allowed its members to overdraw their House checking accounts without the risk of being penalized by the House bank, which was actually a clearinghouse.

The scandal is sometimes called Rubbergate, a Watergate portmanteau with rubber, as in bounced, check. This is a misnomer, as House checks were honored through institutional overdraft protection, with its Sergeant at Arms ensuring payment without penalty. It is also sometimes called the "check-kiting scandal."

== Description ==
The House banking scandal ultimately involved more than 450 representatives, most of whom did not break any laws. However, 22 members of Congress were singled out by the House Ethics Committee for leaving their checking accounts overdrawn for at least eight months out of a sample of 39 months:

Name	State	Party	# of checks	Months overdue
Tommy F. Robinson	Arkansas	Republican	996	16
Robert J. Mrazek	New York	Democratic	920	23
Robert W. Davis	Michigan	Republican	878	13
Doug Walgren	Pennsylvania	Democratic	858	16
Charles F. Hatcher	Georgia	Democratic	819	35
Stephen J. Solarz	New York	Democratic	743	30
Charles Hayes	Illinois	Democratic	716	15
Ronald D. Coleman	Texas	Democratic	673	23
Carl C. Perkins	Kentucky	Democratic	514	14
Bill Alexander	Arkansas	Democratic	487	18
William F. Goodling	Pennsylvania	Republican	430	9
Ed Towns	New York	Democratic	408	18
Ed Feighan	Ohio	Democratic	397	8
Harold Ford Sr.	Tennessee	Democratic	743	30
Mickey Edwards	Oklahoma	Republican	386	13
Bill Clay	Missouri	Democratic	328	9
Tony Coelho	California	Democratic	316	12
John Conyers	Michigan	Democratic	273	9
Mary Rose Oakar	Ohio	Democratic	213	18
Joseph D. Early	Massachusetts	Democratic	124	13
Douglas Bosco	California	Democratic	124	13
Jim Bates	California	Democratic	89	9

Four ex-representatives, one delegate, and the former House Sergeant at Arms were convicted of wrongdoing as a result of the investigation that followed.

Among them, former Representative Buz Lukens (R-OH) was convicted on bribery and conspiracy charges. Former Representative Carl C. Perkins (D-KY) pleaded guilty to various charges including a check kiting scheme involving several financial institutions including the House Bank. Former Representative Carroll Hubbard (D-KY) pleaded guilty to three felonies. The former Sergeant at Arms, Jack Russ, pleaded guilty to three felonies.

The House Bank functioned according to rules that were different from the laws governing deposit institutions. The facility was then operated under very loose rules by using a pencil-and-ledger system, rather than a computerized accounting system. Also, the bank manager did not provide regular account statements to House members, and notifications were not sent to House members who had overdrawn their accounts. Further contributing to the problem was that House Bank did not post deposits in a timely manner, often as much as seven weeks after the fact. Those factors meant that although some knowingly took advantage of the system and were ultimately convicted of wrongdoing, many members of the House who wrote overdrafts were not actually at fault since it was the House Bank's responsibility to post deposits in a timely manner.

Another practice that contributed to the scandal was that House members were allowed to overdraw their accounts if the overdraft did not exceed the member's next paycheck. Many House members used that practice to take unauthorized advances on their paychecks that they would repay later. In a corporate context the practice of drawing money out of the corporation's accounts for personal use is a violation of fiduciary duty to the corporation's shareholders.

Many US banks, like the House Bank, offered overdraft protection to checking account holders. However, the overdrafts in a regular bank's overdraft protection program are always secured by a line of credit with the bank extended under standard lending protocols, including interest charges, if any, linkage of the protected checking account to another account with the necessary funds to pay the overdraft, such as a savings account; or charges made to a credit card held by the depositor.

Until and during the House Bank overdraft scandal, the security for the overdrafts in the House Bank was the member's next paycheck, as posted to his or her checking account in a pencil ledger system. In the aftermath of the House Bank overdraft scandal, two federal credit unions, one for the House (the Congressional Federal Credit Union) and one for the Senate (the United States Senate Federal Credit Union), now provide banking services to Members of Congress and the general public, with no special treatment for Members of Congress.

The credit unions existed long before the scandal. However, the Office of the House Sergeant-at-Arms had offered a much more-convenient clearing house for Members of Congress' checks, and overdraft protection was managed in a much more lenient (and less expensive) manner than that by the credit unions or, for that matter, any chartered bank.

== Public exposure ==
In the early days of the scandal, when the media began reporting on the loose practices, Republican Minority Whip Newt Gingrich, along with seven freshman Republicans referred to as the Gang of Seven, or "The Young Turks," made the strategic decision to publicize the scandal in an attempt to sweep representatives with overdrawn accounts, most of whom were Democrats, out of power, although Gingrich himself had 22 overdrawn checks, one being a $9,463 check to the Internal Revenue Service. Jim Nussle, one of the Gang of Seven, came to national attention when he made a speech from the well of the House while he wore a paper bag over his head to protest the "shameful" ethical behavior involved in the scandal.

Gingrich pressured the Speaker of the House, Tom Foley, to ensure that the special counsel appointed to investigate the matter informed the voting public of the overdrafts and the identities of all of the representatives who were responsible.

== Aftermath ==
Anger at the House banking scandal led Congress to create the Joint Committee on the Organization of Congress, a special joint House-Senate tasked with recommending reforms to the Legislative Branch. Resolutions to create the Joint Committee were introduced in summer 1991, but they did not gain traction until after the scandal. Congress created the Joint Committee in August 1992.

The scandal contributed to a perception of corruption and malfeasance and was a contributing factor to major changes in the House in which 77 Representatives resigned or were ousted by the 1994 elections.

== See also ==
- Congressional Post Office scandal
