= Wes Retherford =

American politician

Member of the Ohio House of Representatives from the 51st district
- In office January 7, 2013 – December 31, 2018
- Preceded by: Courtney Combs
- Succeeded by: Sara Carruthers

Personal details
- Born: March 14, 1984 (age 42) Hamilton, Ohio, U.S.
- Party: Republican
- Education: Talawanda High School
- Profession: Mortician's Assistant

Richard Weston "Wes" Retherford (born March 14, 1984) is a former member of the Ohio House of Representatives. He represented the 51st district which comprises Ross Township, Hamilton and Fairfield, all located in Butler County, Ohio.

== Life and career ==
Retherford is a lifelong resident of Butler County and a graduate of Talawanda High School. Following high school, he enlisted in the United States Marine Corps and served until 2004.

Currently, Retherford is employed as a mortician's assistant. He lives in Hamilton, Ohio with his wife and two children.

== Ohio House of Representatives ==
In 2012, Retherford opted to run for an open seat in the Ohio House of Representatives to succeed Courtney Combs who was term limited. Unopposed in the Republican primary, he went on to defeat Democrat Mark Hardig in the general election with 56.66% of the vote.

In January 2013, Retherford announced that he had been assigned to the following House Standing Committees: Insurance, Agriculture and Natural Resources, and Military and Veteran Affairs.

He was also elected by his peers to serve as the Vice-Chairman of the bipartisan House Veteran's Caucus.

== Arrest ==
On March 12, 2017 Retherford was arrested after being reported to police for passing out in his car at a McDonald's drive-through. Retherford was charged with "improperly handling a firearm in a motor vehicle, a felony, and operating a vehicle while under the influence, a first-degree misdemeanor."

The Butler County Sheriff's Office released the 911 call made that led to Retherford's arrest, who was allegedly passed out in his Chevy Silverado as it was running in the drive-through of a McDonald's in Liberty Twp.

A woman, who was with her daughter, called for law enforcement at 3:23 a.m. Sunday, March 12, 2017. The caller said the man, later identified as Retherford, was sitting in the drive-through and "he's not even up to where he orders. He's just sitting there." The incident report states Retherford had a Glock model 23 with 15 40-caliber rounds in a magazine and one round in the chamber in his vehicle. The weapon was holstered inside a compartment underneath the center armrest. Retherford was transported to the Ohio State Highway Patrol post to take a breathalyzer test, which he refused. He was then transported to the Butler County Jail.
