= Margaret Conditt =

American politician

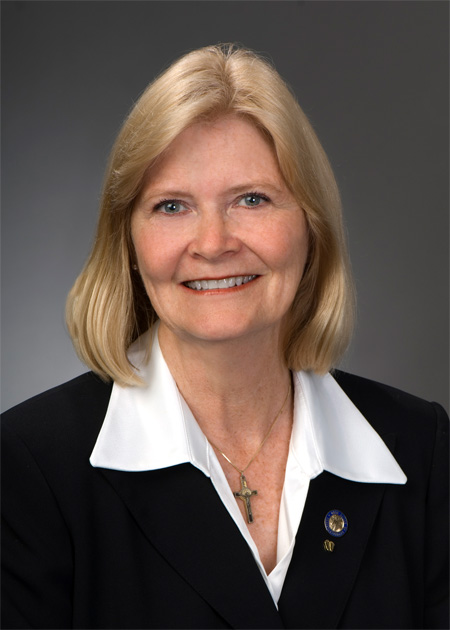

Member of the Ohio House of Representatives from the 52nd district
- In office June 8, 2011 – August 11, 2017
- Preceded by: Bill Coley
- Succeeded by: George Lang

Personal details
- Born: August 7, 1953 (age 73) Mobile, Alabama, U.S.
- Party: Republican
- Education: PhD – University of Colorado Boulder; B.S. – University of Alabama
- Profession: Chemist

Margaret "Margy" Conduit is a former Republican member of the Ohio House of Representatives, who has represented the 52nd District since her appointment in 2011. She was elected to the seat in November 2012, winning 66 percent of the vote. She defeated Democratic candidate Branden Rudie (27.08 percent) and independent candidate Robert Coogan (6.92 percent). She was re-elected to the seat in November 2014, winning 76% of the vote.

== Education ==
Conditt received a Bachelor of Science in Chemistry at the University of Alabama and a Ph.D. in Analytical Environmental Chemistry from the University of Colorado Boulder.
