= Bill Coley =

American politician (born 1960)

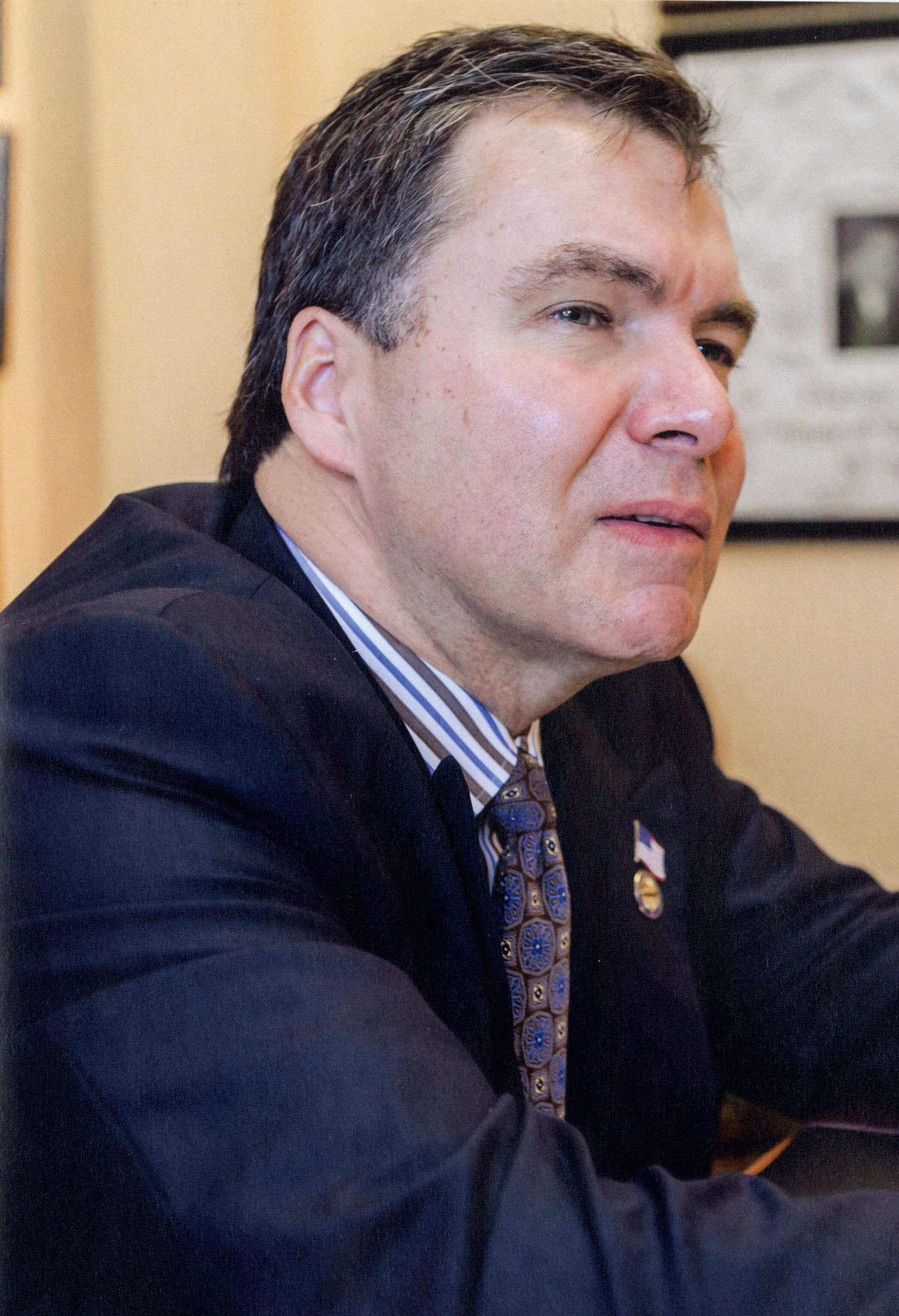

Member of the Ohio Senate from the 4th district
- In office May 24, 2011 – December 31, 2020
- Preceded by: Gary Cates
- Succeeded by: George Lang

Member of the Ohio House of Representatives from the 55th district
- In office January 3, 2005 – May 23, 2011
- Preceded by: Gary Cates
- Succeeded by: Margaret Conditt

Personal details
- Born: August 5, 1960 (age 66) Cincinnati, Ohio, U.S.
- Party: Republican
- Education: University of Dayton; Cleveland State University College of Law
- Profession: Attorney

Bill Coley (born August 5, 1960) is a former Republican member of the Ohio Senate, representing the 4th District from 2011 to 2020. Formerly, he was a member of the Ohio House of Representatives from 2005 to 2011.

== Career ==
After graduation from the University of Dayton and Cleveland State University College of Law, Coley worked as an attorney at the law firm of Strauss & Troy, where he represented a number of small and large businesses. He is also a private pilot.

With incumbent Gary Cates term limited and running for the Ohio Senate, Coley sought to replace him. Unopposed in the primary, he faced Democrat Tyrone Sims in the general election. He won his first term against Sims, winning 70.08% of the electorate.

In 2006, Coley faced his first reelection bid, and was unopposed. He won a third term against Democrat Tony Kilmek in 2008 with 62.81% of the vote. Coley won his final term in 2010 against Suzi Rubin with 69.31% of the votes. During his time in the Ohio House of Representatives, Coley has championed numerous conservative causes and authored the legislation that created the Digital Learning Clearing House, now part of IlearnOhio.org.

== Ohio Senate ==
In early May 2011, Ohio Governor John Kasich announced that he would appoint Senator Gary Cates to a position within the Ohio Board of Regents. As a result, the Senate seat was to be vacant and Coley announced that he would seek the vacant seat in the Ohio Senate.

Coley, along with Timothy Derickson and three other citizens of Butler County, sought the seat, but in the end, Coley received the recommendation of the Butler County Republican Party and was chosen by Senate Republicans to succeed Cates in representing the Fourth District. He took his seat on May 24, 2011, and was required to resign his seat in the Ohio House of Representatives to do so.

Now in the Senate, Coley is serving as chairman of the Government Oversight and Reform Committee as well as serving on the committees of Education; Finance; Energy and Public Utilities and Financial Institutions. He also serves on the eTech Ohio Commission as well at the permanent joint committee on gaming and wagering.

In 2012, Coley won a full term in the Senate. He was unopposed in the general election.

== Policies, positions, and initiatives ==
=== Collective Bargaining ===
Coley has also come out to ensure that all public employees are able to still collective bargain for safety equipment, and to remove a ban on public workers talking to their local elected officials during negotiations. Such changes were widely regarded as improvements to S.B. 5, which passed the Ohio Senate 17-16. Coley supported the bill, and voted for its passage out of committee. During the House floor debate on SB 5, Coley delivered a passionate argument in support of the bill and he voted for the bill to pass out of the full Ohio House of Representatives.
