= Courtney Combs =

American politician

Member of the Ohio House of Representatives from the 54th district
- In office January 21, 2004 – January 6, 2013
- Preceded by: Greg Jolivette
- Succeeded by: Wes Retherford

Personal details
- Born: August 2, 1945 (age 81) Cincinnati, Ohio
- Party: Republican
- Education: Miami University
- Profession: Realtor

Courtney Combs was a member of the Ohio House of Representatives, representing the 54th District since his appointment in 2004. He was the Chairman of the House Criminal Justice Committee. He is a member of the Republican Party.

== Career ==
A graduate of Miami University, Combs served on Hamilton City Council and was Butler County Commissioner from 1986 to 2004. He is a licensed Realtor, and is a broker of Combs Group Realty.

== Ohio House of Representatives ==
While Combs initially had planned to run against Gary Cates for the Fourth District of the Ohio Senate, he instead filed for the Ohio House. In another turn of events that expedited his career at the Statehouse, Greg Jolivette who had decided to run for Combs' Commission seat, resigned early so the two could simultaneously swap seats. He was sworn into the House on January 21, 2004. Combs faced no opposition to retain his seat in 2004.

In 2006, Combs won reelection against Democrats Kenneth Keith with 57.16% of the vote. In 2008, he won a third full term, again against Keith, with 57.04% of the vote.

With his reelection in 2010 over Democrat Bruce Carter with 62.2% of the vote, Combs will be Dean of the House of Representatives in the 129th General Assembly. Speaker of the House William G. Batchelder has named Combs as a member of the Republican majority caucus' Policy Committee. He also serves on the committees of Insurance; State Government and Elections and its Subcommittee on Redistricting; and Criminal Justice (as Chairman). Combs also serves on the Butler County Transportation Improvement District Board of Trustees; and on the Turnpike Legislative Review Committee.

In 2011, Combs announced that he would seek a seat on the Butler County Board of Commissioners.

== Initiatives and positions ==
In his fourth and final term, Combs introduced legislation that will lift the cap on online charter schools. With the introduction of John Kasich's biennium budget, the number of vouchers available for charter schools has quadrupled. Both initiatives have come with criticism from teachers' unions.

Combs has also introduced a bill that would designate Lentil as the State Children's Book and make Robert McCloskey the State Children's Author.

As chairman of the Transportation, Public Safety and Homeland Security Committee, Combs garnered unanimous support for a bill that would ban texting while driving, and voted the bill out of the committee.

A proponent of the immigration reform, Combs has introduced legislation to show Ohio's support for the state of Arizona in its legal battle with the federal government over Arizona's efforts to control illegal immigration. Opponents of the measure says it's overreaching and amounts to racial profiling, but supporters say it is a necessary step in combatting illegal immigrants.
