= Congressional Post Office scandal =

1990s US political scandal

The Congressional Post Office scandal was the discovery of corruption among various Congressional Post Office employees and members of the United States House of Representatives, investigated 1991–1995, culminating in House Ways and Means Committee chairman Dan Rostenkowski (D-IL) pleading guilty in 1996 to reduced charges of mail fraud.

Initially an investigation by the United States Capitol Police into a single embezzlement charge against a single employee, evidence rapidly led to the inclusion of several other employees, before top Democrats in the House of Representatives moved to shut down the whole line of inquiry, despite protests from Frank Kerrigan, chief of the Capitol Police.

A new investigation was started by the United States Postal Inspection Service, which eventually submitted a report to Congress. This was held by Speaker Tom Foley (D-WA) until media reports of embezzlement and money laundering leaked in 1992. Following public outcry, Democratic leaders of the House were pressured to refer the matter to the United States House Committee on House Administration, which started its own investigation.

That committee broke into two parts along party lines, with the Democrats issuing a report saying the matter was closed, but the Republicans issuing a dissenting report, including a number of unanswered questions and problems with the investigation. The Republican charges were largely ignored until July 1993, when Robert Rota, the Congressional Postmaster, pleaded guilty to three criminal charges, implicating Representatives Dan Rostenkowski (D-IL), Joe Kolter (D-PA) and his then Chief of Staff.

They were accused of heading a conspiracy to launder Post Office money through stamps and postal vouchers. Rostenkowski pleaded guilty in 1996 to mail fraud and was sentenced to 18 months in prison.

In 2000, just before he left office, U.S. President Bill Clinton pardoned Rostenkowski, which became part of a larger controversy about Clinton's pardons.

== See also ==
- House banking scandal
- Gang of Seven
