= Greg Jolivette =

American politician

Member of the Ohio House of Representatives from the 54th district
- In office October 15, 1997 – January 16, 2004
- Preceded by: Michael A. Fox
- Succeeded by: Courtney Combs

Personal details
- Party: Republican

Greg Jolivette is a politician in the U.S. state of Ohio: a previous Butler County Commissioner, he has served in the Ohio House of Representatives, representing the Hamilton, Ohio area.

While Jolivette was the mayor of Butler County's largest city during the 1980s, the city changed its name from "Hamilton" to "Hamilton!"
