= John Glenn =

American astronaut and politician (1921–2016)

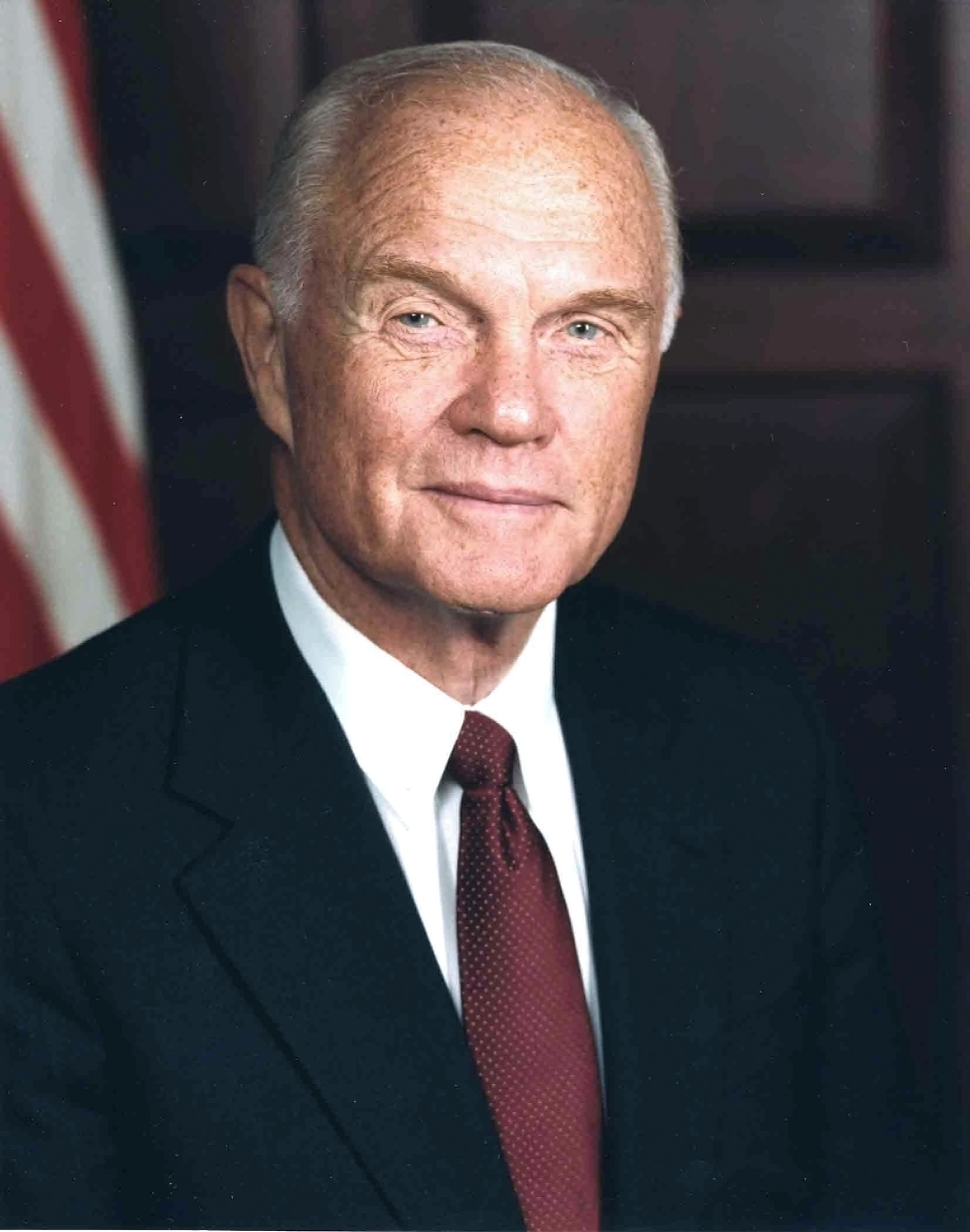
- Official portrait, 1990s

United States Senator from Ohio
- In office December 24, 1974 – January 3, 1999
- Preceded by: Howard Metzenbaum
- Succeeded by: George Voinovich
Senate positions
Chair of the Senate Governmental Affairs Committee
In office January 3, 1987 – January 3, 1995
Preceded by	William Roth
Succeeded by	William Roth
Ranking Member of the Senate Governmental Affairs Committee
In office January 3, 1995 – January 3, 1999
Preceded by	William Roth
Succeeded by	Joe Lieberman
Ranking Member of the Senate Aging Committee
In office January 3, 1983 – January 3, 1987
Preceded by	Lawton Chiles
Succeeded by	John Heinz

Personal details
- Born: John Herschel Glenn Jr. July 18, 1921 Cambridge, Ohio, U.S.
- Died: December 8, 2016 (aged 95) Columbus, Ohio, U.S.
- Resting place: Arlington National Cemetery
- Party: Democratic
- Spouse: Annie Castor (m. 1943)
- Children: 2
- Education: Muskingum University (BS)
- Civilian awards: Congressional Gold Medal; Presidential Medal of Freedom; Congressional Space Medal of Honor; NASA Distinguished Service Medal
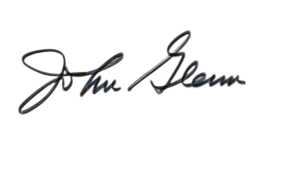
- Signature

Military service
- Branch/service: United States Navy; United States Marine Corps
- Years of service: 1941–1965
- Rank: Colonel
- Battles/wars: World War II; Korean War
- Military awards: Distinguished Flying Cross (6); Air Medal (18)
- Space career

NASA astronaut
- Time in space: 4h 55m 23s
- Selection: NASA Group 1 (1959)
- Mission: Mercury-Atlas 6
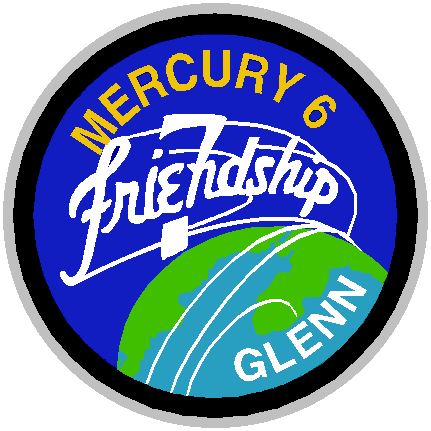
- Mission insignia
- Retired: January 16, 1964
- Space career

NASA payload specialist
- Time in space: 8d 21h 43m
- Mission: STS-95
- Mission insignia

John Herschel Glenn Jr. (July 18, 1921 – December 8, 2016) was an American Marine Corps aviator, astronaut, businessman, and politician. He was the third American in space and the first to orbit the Earth, circling it three times in 1962. Following his retirement from NASA, he served from 1974 to 1999 as a U.S. senator from Ohio. In 1998, he flew into space again at the age of 77.

Before joining NASA, Glenn was a distinguished fighter pilot in World War II, the Chinese Civil War, and the Korean War. He shot down three MiG-15s and was awarded six Distinguished Flying Crosses and eighteen Air Medals. In 1957, he made the first supersonic transcontinental flight across the United States. His on-board camera took the first continuous, panoramic photograph of the United States.

Glenn was one of the Mercury Seven military test pilots selected in 1959 by NASA as the nation's first astronauts. On February 20, 1962, Glenn flew the Friendship 7 mission, becoming the first American to orbit the Earth. He was the third American, and the fifth person, to be in space. He received the NASA Distinguished Service Medal in 1962, the Congressional Space Medal of Honor in 1978, was inducted into the U.S. Astronaut Hall of Fame in 1990, and received the Presidential Medal of Freedom in 2012.

Glenn resigned from NASA in January 1964. A member of the Democratic Party, Glenn was first elected to the Senate in 1974 and served for 24 years until January 1999. In 1998, at age 77, Glenn flew on Space Shuttle Discovery's STS-95 mission, making him the oldest person to enter Earth orbit, the only person to fly in both the Mercury and the Space Shuttle programs, and the first member of Congress to visit space since Congressman Bill Nelson in 1986. Glenn, both the oldest and the last surviving member of the Mercury Seven, died at the age of 95 on December 8, 2016.

== Early life and education ==
John Herschel Glenn Jr. was born on July 18, 1921, in Cambridge, Ohio, the son of John Herschel Glenn Sr., who worked for a plumbing firm, and Clara Teresa Glenn (née Sproat), a teacher. His parents had married shortly before John Sr., a member of the American Expeditionary Force, left for the Western Front during World War I. The family moved to New Concord, Ohio, soon after his birth, and his father started his own business, the Glenn Plumbing Company. Glenn Jr. was only a toddler when he met Anna Margaret (Annie) Castor, whom he would later marry. The two would not be able to recall a time when they did not know each other. He first flew in an airplane with his father when he was eight years old. He became fascinated by flight and built model airplanes from balsa wood kits. Along with his adopted sister Jean, he attended New Concord Elementary School. He washed cars and sold rhubarb to earn money to buy a bicycle, after which he took a job delivering The Columbus Dispatch newspaper. He was a member of the Ohio Rangers, an organization similar to the Cub Scouts. His boyhood home in New Concord has been restored as a historic house museum and education center.

Glenn attended New Concord High School, where he played on the varsity football team as a center and linebacker. He also made the varsity basketball and tennis teams and was involved with Hi-Y, a junior branch of the YMCA. After graduating in 1939, Glenn entered Muskingum College (now Muskingum University), where he studied chemistry, joined the Stag Club fraternity, and played on the football team. Annie majored in music with minors in secretarial studies and physical education and competed on the swimming and volleyball teams, graduating in 1942. Glenn earned a private pilot license and a physics course credit for free through the Civilian Pilot Training Program in 1941. He did not complete his senior year in residence or take a proficiency exam, both required by the school for its Bachelor of Science degree. (Note: Muskingum awarded his bachelor's degree in 1962, after Glenn's Mercury space flight.)

== Military career ==
=== World War II ===
When the United States entered World War II, Glenn quit college to enlist in the U.S. Army Air Corps. He was not called to duty by the army and enlisted as a U.S. Navy aviation cadet in March 1942. Glenn attended the University of Iowa in Iowa City for pre-flight training and made his first solo flight in a military aircraft at Naval Air Station Olathe in Kansas, where he went for primary training. During advanced training at Naval Air Station Corpus Christi in Texas, he accepted an offer to transfer to the U.S. Marine Corps. Having completed his flight training in March 1943, Glenn was commissioned as a second lieutenant. Glenn married Annie in a Presbyterian ceremony at College Drive Church in New Concord on April 6, 1943. After advanced training at Camp Kearny, California, he was assigned to Marine Squadron VMJ-353, which flew R4D transport planes from there.

The fighter squadron VMO-155 was also at Camp Kearny flying the Grumman F4F Wildcat. Glenn approached the squadron's commander, Major J. P. Haines, who suggested that he could put in for a transfer. This was approved, and Glenn was posted to VMO-155 on July 2, 1943, two days before the squadron moved to Marine Corps Air Station El Centro in California. The Wildcat was obsolete by this time, and VMO-155 re-equipped with the F4U Corsair in September 1943. He was promoted to first lieutenant in October 1943, and shipped out to Hawaii in January 1944. VMO-155 became part of the garrison on Midway Atoll on February 21, then moved to the Marshall Islands in June 1944 and flew 57 combat missions in the area. He received two Distinguished Flying Crosses and ten Air Medals.

At the end of his one-year tour of duty in February 1945, Glenn was assigned to Marine Corps Air Station Cherry Point in North Carolina, then to Naval Air Station Patuxent River in Maryland. He was promoted to captain in July 1945 and ordered back to Cherry Point. There, he joined VMF-913, another Corsair squadron, and learned that he had qualified for a regular commission. In March 1946, he was assigned to Marine Corps Air Station El Toro in southern California. He volunteered for service with the occupation in North China, believing it would be a short tour. He joined VMF-218 (another Corsair squadron), which was based at Nanyuan Field near Beijing, in December 1946, and flew patrol missions until VMF-218 was transferred to Guam in March 1947.

In December 1948, Glenn was re-posted to NAS Corpus Christi as a student at the Naval School of All-Weather Flight before becoming a flight instructor. In July 1951, he traveled to the Amphibious Warfare School at Marine Corps Base Quantico in northern Virginia for a six-month course. He then joined the staff of the commandant of the Marine Corps Schools. He maintained his proficiency (and flight pay) by flying on weekends, although he was only allowed four hours of flying time per month. He was promoted to major in July 1952. Glenn received the World War II Victory Medal, American Campaign Medal, Asiatic-Pacific Campaign Medal (with one star), Navy Occupation Service Medal (with Asia clasp), and the China Service Medal for his efforts.

=== Korean War ===
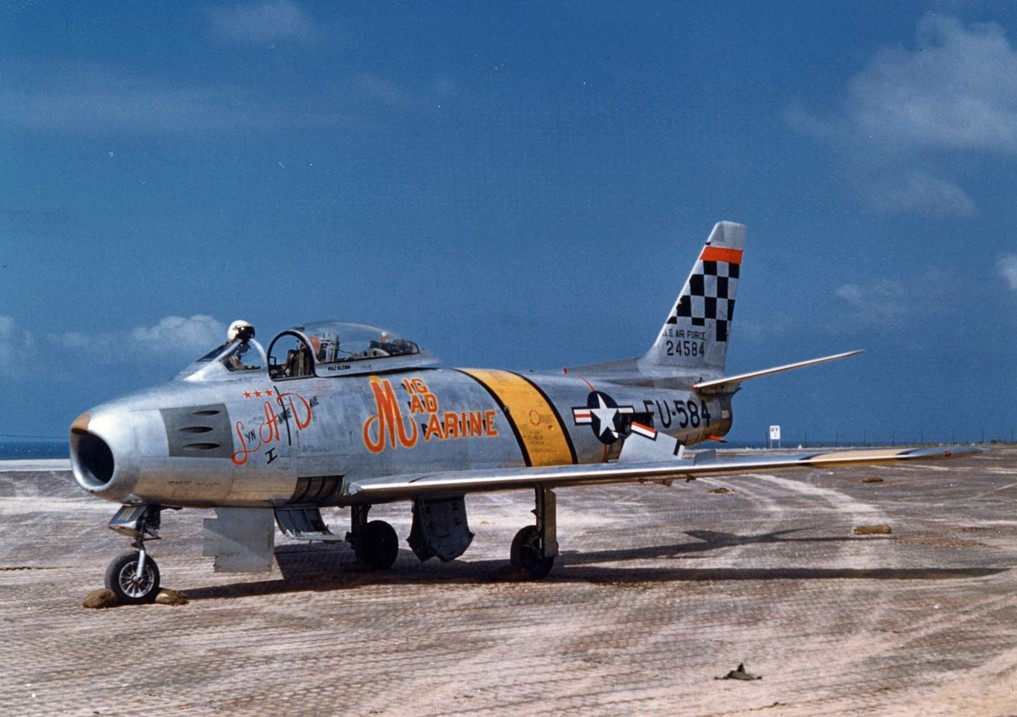
Glenn's USAF F-86F, dubbed "MiG Mad Marine", during the Korean War in 1953. The names of his wife and children are also written on the aircraft.

Glenn moved his family back to New Concord during a short period of leave, and after two and a half months of jet training at Cherry Point, was ordered to South Korea in October 1952, late in the Korean War. Before he set out for Korea in February 1953, he applied to fly the F-86 Sabre jet fighter-interceptor through an inter-service exchange position with the U.S. Air Force (USAF). In preparation, he arranged with Colonel Leon W. Gray to check out the F-86 at Otis Air Force Base in Massachusetts. Glenn reported to K-3, an airbase in South Korea, on February 3, 1953, and was assigned to be the operations officer for VMF-311, one of two Marine fighter squadrons there while he waited for the exchange assignment to go through. VMF-311 was equipped with the F9F Panther jet fighter-bomber. Glenn's first mission was a reconnaissance flight on February 26. He flew 63 combat missions in Korea with VMF-311 and was nicknamed "Magnet Ass" because of the number of flak hits he took on low-level close air support missions; twice, he returned to base with over 250 holes in his plane. He flew for a time with Marine reservist Ted Williams (then in the midst of a Hall of Fame baseball career with the Boston Red Sox) as his wingman. Williams later said about Glenn, "Absolutely fearless. The best I ever saw. It was an honor to fly with him." Glenn also flew with future major general Ralph H. Spanjer.

In June 1953, Glenn reported for duty with the USAF's 25th Fighter-Interceptor Squadron and flew 27 combat missions in the F-86, a much faster aircraft than the F9F Panther, patrolling MiG Alley. Combat with a MiG-15—which was faster and better armed than the F-86—was regarded as a rite of passage for a fighter pilot. On the Air Force buses that ferried the pilots out to the airfields before dawn, pilots who had engaged a MiG could sit while those who had not had to stand. Glenn later wrote, "Since the days of the Lafayette Escadrille during World War I, pilots have viewed air-to-air combat as the ultimate test not only of their machines but of their own personal determination and flying skills. I was no exception." He hoped to become the second Marine jet flying ace after John F. Bolt. Glenn's USAF squadron mates painted "MiG Mad Marine" on his aircraft when he complained about there not being any MiGs to shoot at. He shot down his first MiG in a dogfight on July 12, 1953, downed a second one on July 19, and a third on July 22 when four Sabres shot down three MiGs. These were the final air victories of the war, which ended with an armistice five days later. For his service in Korea, Glenn received two more Distinguished Flying Crosses and eight more Air Medals. Glenn also received the Korean Service Medal (with two campaign stars), United Nations Korea Medal, Marine Corps Expeditionary Medal, National Defense Service Medal (with one star), and the Korean War Service Medal.

=== Test pilot ===
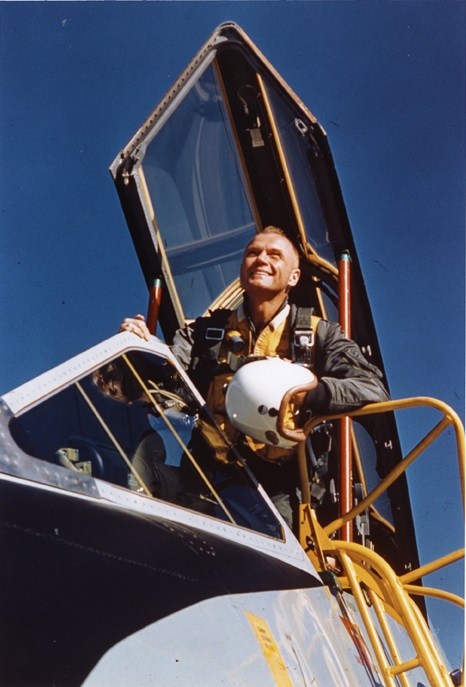
Glenn standing in the cockpit of a F-106B in 1961

With combat experience as a fighter pilot, Glenn applied for training as a test pilot while still in Korea. He reported to the U.S. Naval Test Pilot School at NAS Patuxent River in Maryland in January 1954 and graduated in July. At Patuxent River, future Medal of Honor recipient James Stockdale tutored him in physics and math. Glenn's first flight test assignment, testing the FJ-3 Fury, nearly killed him when its cockpit depressurized and its oxygen system failed. He also tested the armament of aircraft such as the Vought F7U Cutlass and F8U Crusader. From November 1956 to April 1959, he was assigned to the Fighter Design Branch of the Navy Bureau of Aeronautics in Washington, D.C., and attended the University of Maryland.

On July 16, 1957, Glenn made the first supersonic transcontinental flight. Disliking his Bureau of Aeronautics desk job, he devised the flight as both a way to keep flying and publicly demonstrate the F8U Crusader. At that time, the transcontinental speed record, held by an Air Force Republic F-84 Thunderjet, was 3 hours 45 minutes and Glenn calculated that the F8U Crusader could do it faster. Because its 586-mile-per-hour (943 km/h) air speed was faster than that of a .45 caliber bullet, Glenn called the flight Project Bullet. He flew an F8U Crusader 2,445 miles (3,935 km) from Los Alamitos, California, to Floyd Bennett Field in New York City in 3 hours, 23 minutes and 8.3 seconds, averaging supersonic speed despite three in-flight refuelings when speeds dropped below 300 miles per hour (480 km/h). His on-board camera took the first continuous, transcontinental panoramic photograph of the United States. He received his fifth Distinguished Flying Cross for this mission, and was promoted to lieutenant colonel on April 1, 1959. The cross-country flight made Glenn a minor celebrity. A profile appeared in The New York Times, and he appeared on the television show Name That Tune. Glenn now had nearly 9,000 hours of flying time, including about 3,000 hours in jets, but knew that at the age of 36, he was now likely too old to continue to fly.

== NASA career ==
Various NASA video clips of Glenn through the years.

=== Selection ===
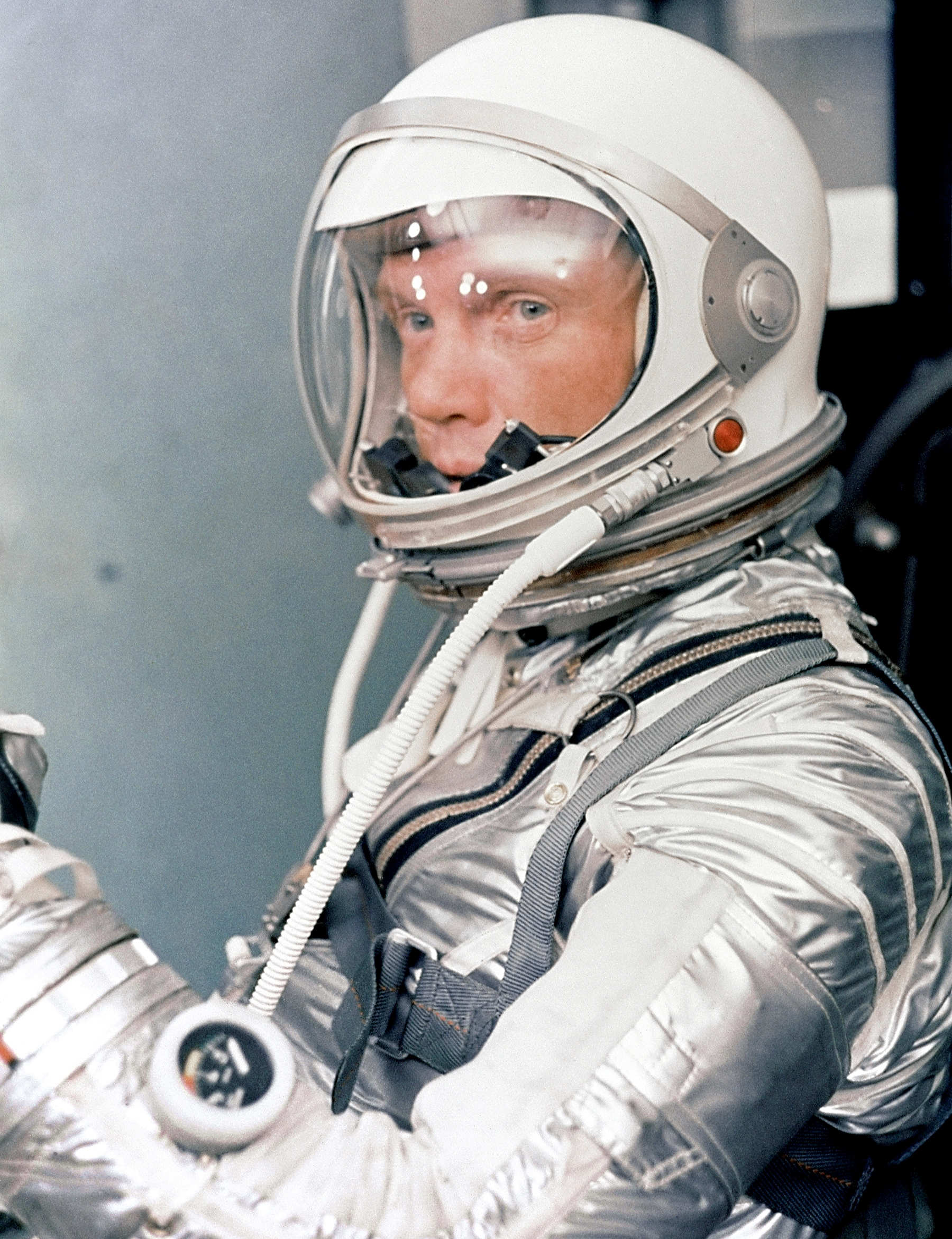
Glenn in his Mercury spacesuit in 1962

On October 4, 1957, the Soviet Union launched Sputnik 1, the first artificial satellite. This damaged American confidence in its technological superiority, creating a wave of anxiety known as the Sputnik crisis. In response, President Dwight D. Eisenhower launched the Space Race. The National Aeronautics and Space Administration (NASA) was established on October 1, 1958, as a civilian agency to develop space technology. One of its first initiatives was announced on December 17, 1958. This was Project Mercury, which aimed to launch a man into Earth orbit, return him safely to the Earth, and evaluate his capabilities in space.

His Bureau of Aeronautics job gave Glenn access to new spaceflight news, such as the X-15 rocket plane. While on duty at Patuxent and in Washington, Glenn read everything he could find about space. His office was asked to send a test pilot to Langley Air Force Base in Virginia to make runs on a spaceflight simulator, as part of research by the newly formed NASA into re-entry vehicle shapes. The pilot would also be sent to the Naval Air Development Center in Johnsville, Pennsylvania, and would be subjected to high G-forces in a centrifuge for comparison with data collected in the simulator. His request for the position was granted, and he spent several days at Langley and a week in Johnsville for the testing. As one of the very few pilots to have done such testing, Glenn had become an expert on the subject. NASA asked military-service members to participate in planning the mockup of a spacecraft. Having participated in the research at Langley and Johnsville, he was sent to the McDonnell plant in St. Louis as a service adviser to NASA's spacecraft mockup board. Envisioning himself in the vehicle, Glenn stated that the passenger would have to be able to control the spacecraft. McDonnell engineers told him of the importance of lightening the vehicle as much as possible, so Glenn began exercising to lose the 30 pounds (14 kg) by which he estimated he was overweight.

Eisenhower directed NASA to recruit its first astronauts from military test pilots. Of 508 graduates of test pilot schools, 110 matched the minimum standards. Marine Corps pilots were mistakenly omitted at first; two were quickly found, including Glenn. The candidates had to be younger than 40, possess a bachelor's degree or equivalent, and be 5 feet 11 inches (1.80 m) or less. Only the height requirement was strictly enforced, owing to the size of the Project Mercury spacecraft. This was fortunate for Glenn, who barely met the requirements, as he was near the age cutoff and lacked a science-based degree, but had taken more classes since leaving college than needed for graduation. Glenn was otherwise so outstanding a candidate that Colonel Jake Dill, his commanding officer at test pilot school, visited NASA headquarters to insist that Glenn would be the perfect astronaut.

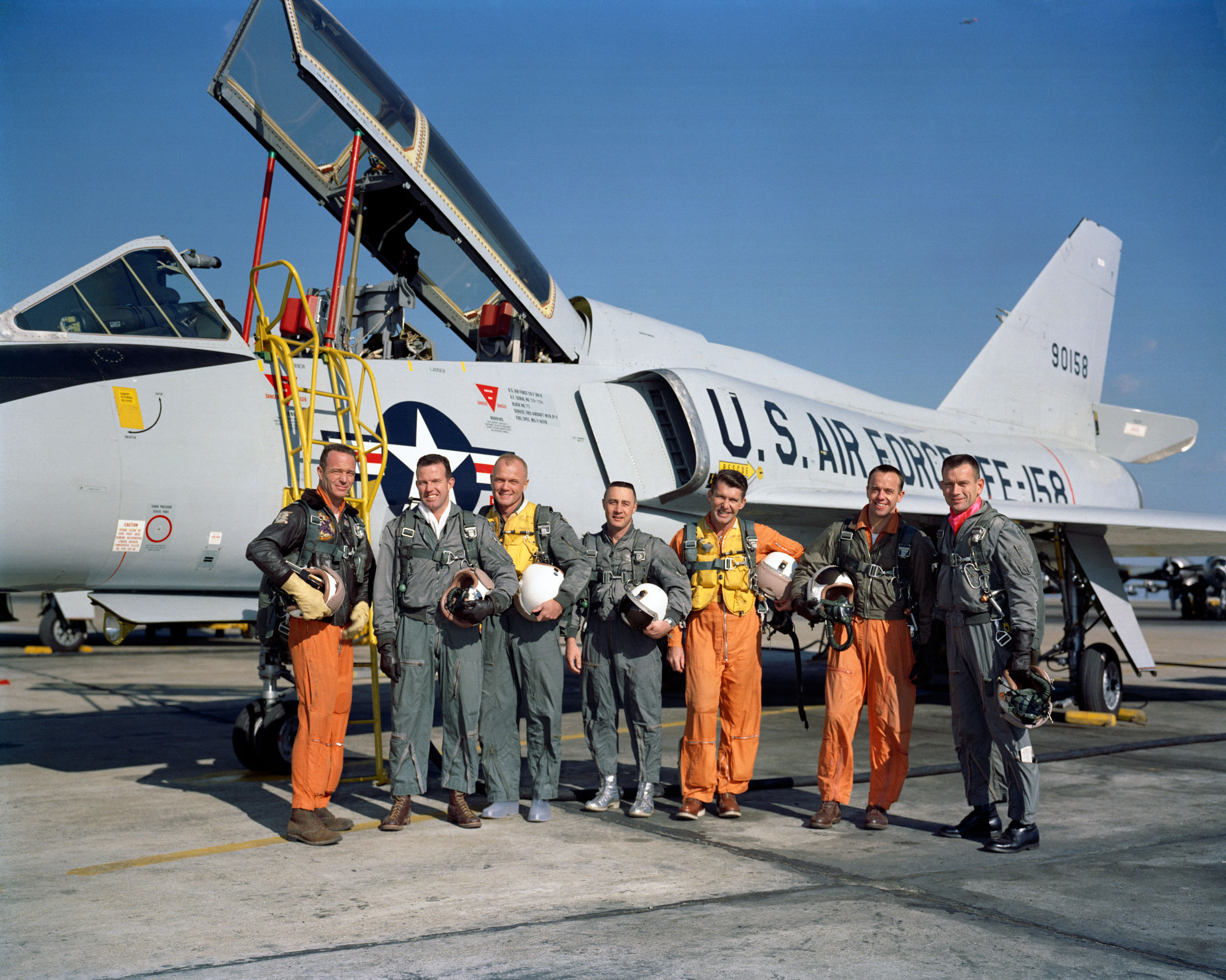
The Mercury Seven astronauts posing with a USAF F-106

For an interview with Charles Donlan, associate director of Project Mercury, Glenn brought the results from the centrifuge to show that he had done well on a test that perhaps no other candidate had taken. Donlan also noticed that Glenn stayed late at night to study schematics of the Mercury spacecraft. He was among the 32 of the first 69 candidates that passed the first step of the evaluation and were interested in continuing, sufficient for the astronaut corps NASA wanted. On February 27 a grueling series of physical and psychological tests began at the Lovelace Clinic and the Wright Aerospace Medical Laboratory.

Because of his Bureau of Aeronautics job, Glenn was already participating in Project Mercury; while other candidates were at Wright, on March 17 he and most of those who would choose the astronauts visited the McDonnell plant building the spacecraft to inspect its progress and make changes. While Glenn had not scored the highest on all the tests, a member of the selection committee recalled how he had impressed everyone with his "strength of personality and his dedication". On April 6 Donlan called Glenn to offer him a position at Project Mercury, one of seven candidates chosen as astronauts. Glenn was pleased while Annie was supportive but wary of the danger; during his three years at Patuxent, 12 test pilots had died.

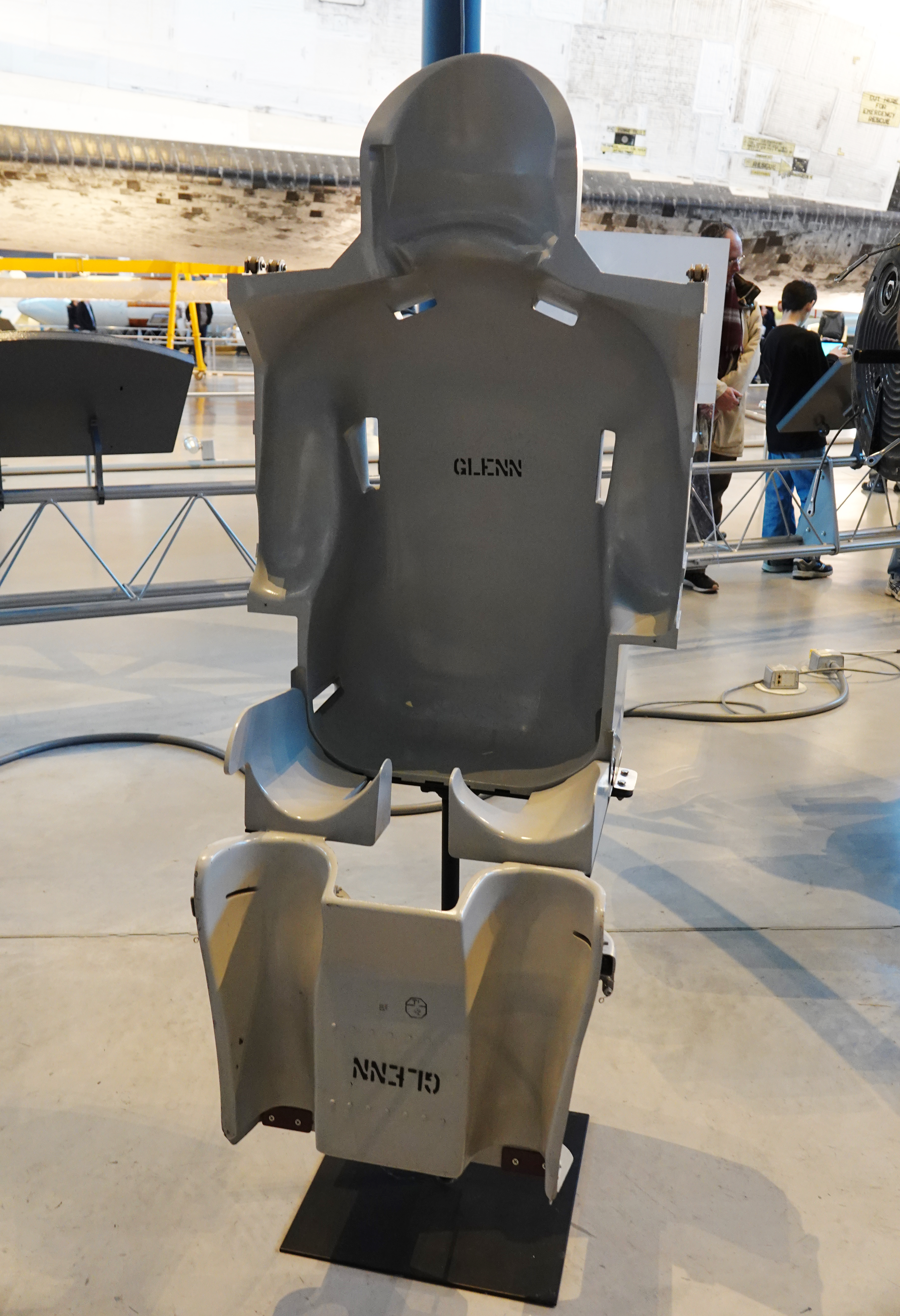
John Glenn Training Couch at Steven F. Udvar-Hazy Center Virginia USA

The identities of the seven were announced at a press conference at Dolley Madison House in Washington, D.C., on April 9, 1959: Scott Carpenter, Gordon Cooper, Glenn, Gus Grissom, Wally Schirra, Alan Shepard, and Deke Slayton. In The Right Stuff, Tom Wolfe wrote that Glenn "came out of it as tops among seven very fair-haired boys. He had the hottest record as a pilot, he was the most quotable, the most photogenic, and the lone Marine." The magnitude of the challenge ahead of them was made clear a few weeks later, on the night of May 18, 1959, when the seven astronauts gathered at Cape Canaveral to watch their first rocket launch, of an SM-65D Atlas, which was similar to the one that was to carry them into orbit. A few minutes after liftoff, it exploded spectacularly, lighting up the night sky. The astronauts were stunned. Shepard turned to Glenn and said: "Well, I'm glad they got that out of the way."

Glenn remained an officer in the Marine Corps after his selection, and was assigned to the NASA Space Task Group at Langley Research Center in Hampton, Virginia. The task force moved to Houston, Texas, in 1962, and became part of the NASA Manned Spacecraft Center. A portion of the astronauts' training was in the classroom, where they learned space science. The group also received hands-on training, which included scuba diving and work in simulators. Astronauts secured an additional role in the spaceflight program: to provide pilot input in design. The astronauts divided the various tasks between them. Glenn's specialization was cockpit layout design and control functioning for the Mercury and early Apollo programs. He pressed the other astronauts to set a moral example, living up to the squeaky-clean image of them that had been portrayed by Life magazine, a position that was not popular with the other astronauts.

=== Friendship 7 flight ===
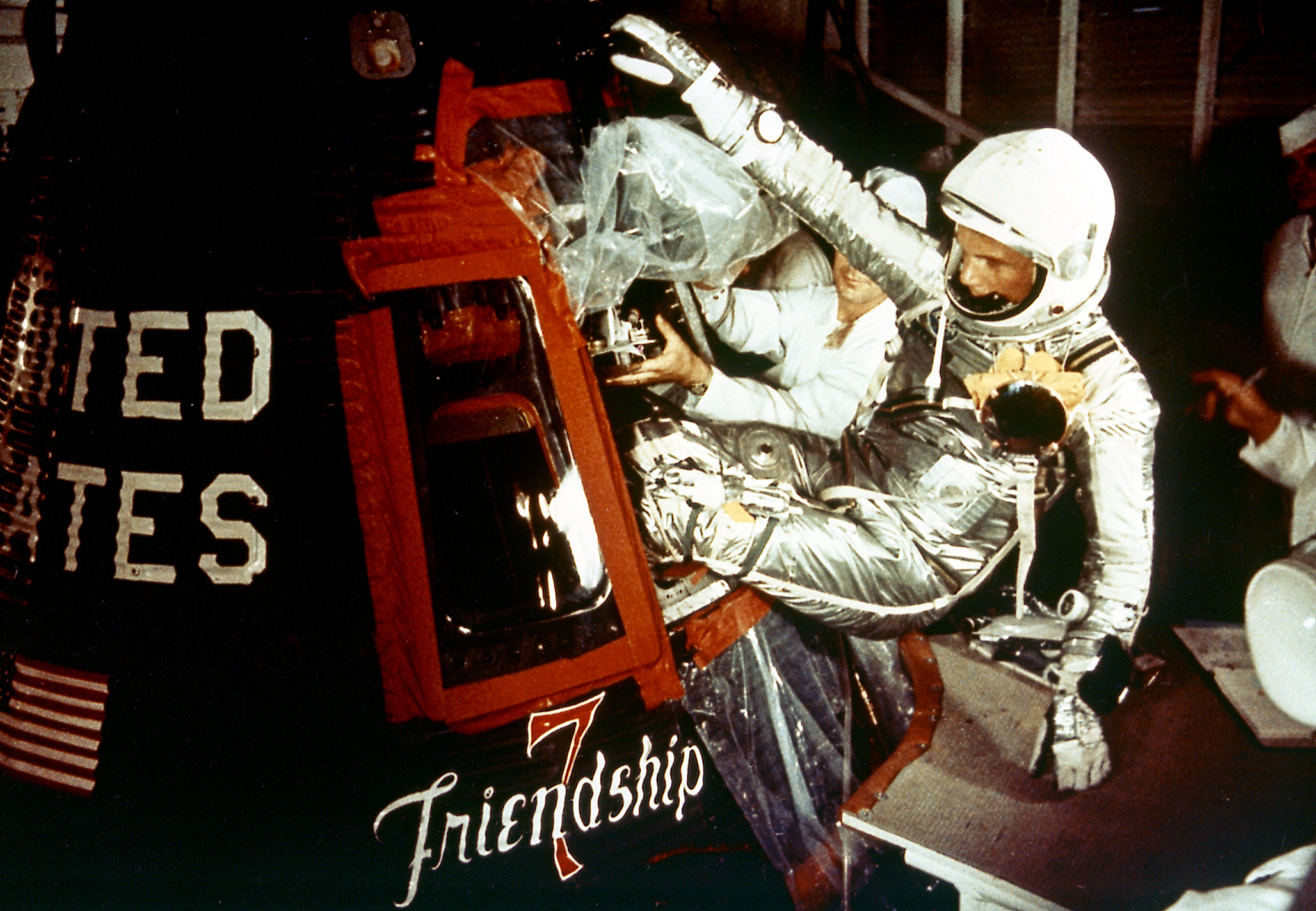
Glenn entering his spacecraft, Friendship 7, prior to the launch of Mercury-Atlas 6 on February 20, 1962

Glenn was the backup pilot for Shepard and Grissom on the first two crewed Project Mercury flights, the sub-orbital missions Mercury-Redstone 3 and Mercury-Redstone 4. Glenn was selected for Mercury-Atlas 6, NASA's first crewed orbital flight, with Carpenter as his backup. Putting a man in orbit would achieve one of Project Mercury's most important goals. Shepard and Grissom had named their spacecraft Freedom 7 and Liberty Bell 7. The numeral 7 had originally been the production number of Shepard's spacecraft, but had come to represent the Mercury 7. Glenn named his spacecraft, number 13, Friendship 7, and had the name hand-painted on the side like the one on his F-86 had been. Glenn and Carpenter completed their training for the mission in January 1962, but postponement of the launch allowed them to continue rehearsing. Glenn spent 25 hours and 25 minutes in the spacecraft performing hangar and altitude tests, and 59 hours and 45 minutes in the simulator. He flew 70 simulated missions and reacted to 189 simulated system failures.

After a long series of delays, Friendship 7 lifted off from Cape Canaveral Air Force Station on February 20, 1962. During the countdown, there were eleven delays due to equipment malfunctions and improvements and the weather. During Glenn's first orbit, a failure of the automatic-control system was detected. This forced Glenn to operate in manual mode for the second and third orbits, and for re-entry. Later in the flight, telemetry indicated that the heat shield had loosened. If this reading had been accurate, Glenn and his spacecraft would have burned up on re-entry. After a lengthy discussion on how to deal with this problem, ground controllers decided that leaving the retrorocket pack in place might help keep the loose heat shield in place. They relayed these instructions to Glenn, but did not tell him the heat shield was possibly loose; although confused at this order, he complied. The retrorocket pack broke up into large chunks of flaming debris that flew past the window of his capsule during re-entry; Glenn thought this might have been the heat shield. He told an interviewer, "Fortunately it was the rocket pack—or I wouldn't be answering these questions." After the flight, it was determined that the heat shield was not loose; the sensor was faulty due to an improperly rigged switch.

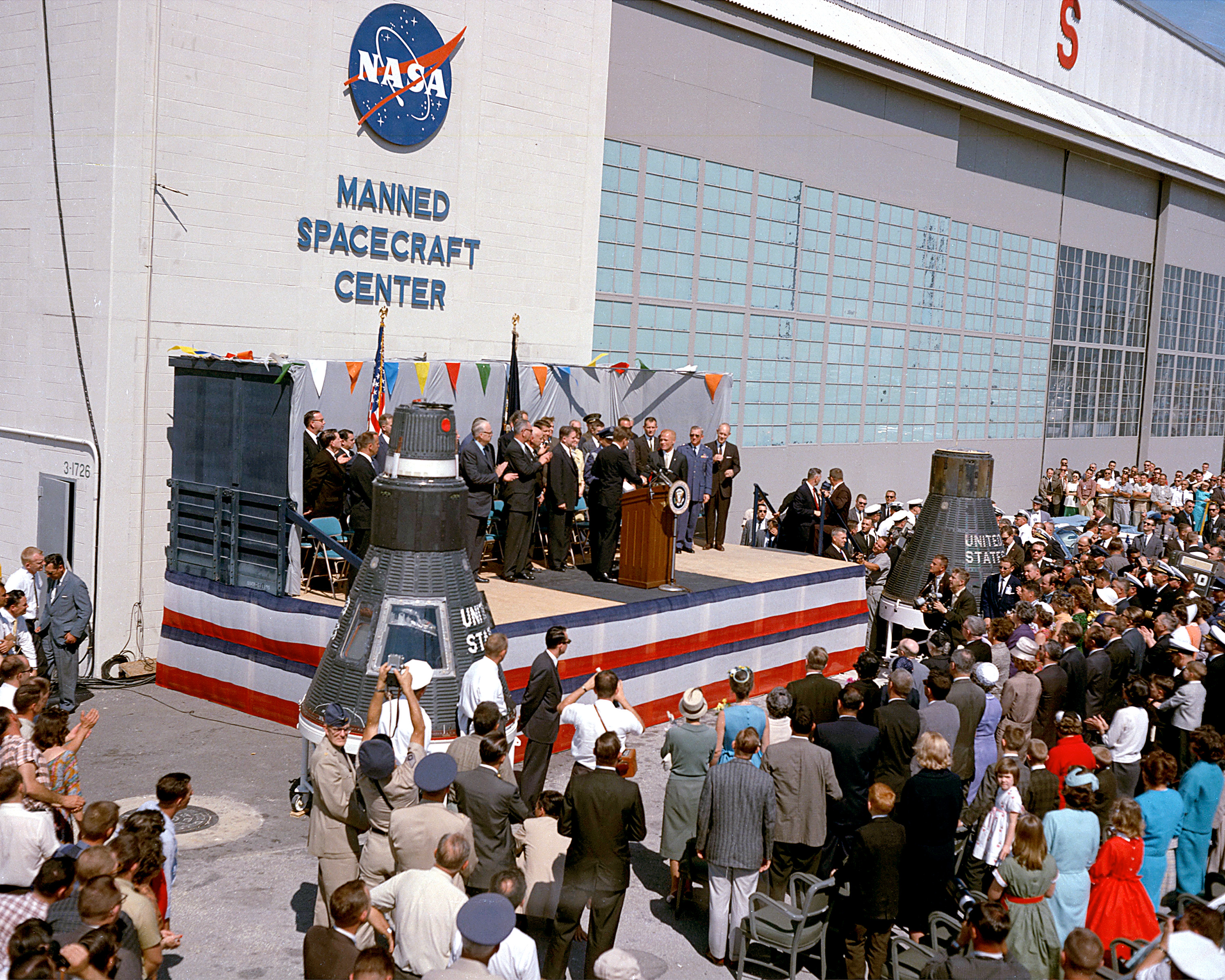
Glenn being honored by U.S. President Kennedy at temporary Manned Spacecraft Center facilities at Cape Canaveral, Florida, three days after his flight

Friendship 7 safely splashed down 800 miles (1,290 km) southeast of Cape Canaveral after Glenn's 4-hour, 55-minute flight. (Note: The spacecraft landed 41 miles (66 km) west and 19 miles (31 km) north of the target landing site. Friendship 7 was recovered by the USS Noa, which had the spacecraft on the deck 21 minutes after landing; Glenn was in the capsule during the recovery operation.) He carried a note on the flight which read, "I am a stranger. I come in peace. Take me to your leader and there will be a massive reward for you in eternity" in several languages, in case he landed near southern Pacific Ocean islands. The original procedure called for Glenn to exit through the top hatch, but he was uncomfortably warm and decided that egress through the side hatch would be faster. During the flight, he endured up to 7.8 g of acceleration and traveled 75,679 miles (121,794 km) at about 17,500 miles per hour (28,200 km/h). The flight took Glenn to a maximum altitude (apogee) of about 162 miles (261 km) and a minimum altitude (perigee) of 100 miles (160 km) . Unlike the crewed missions of Soviet Union's Vostok programme, Glenn remained within the spacecraft during landing. The flight made Glenn the first American to orbit the Earth, the third American in space, and the fifth human in space. (Note: Perth, Western Australia, became known worldwide as the "City of Light" when residents turned on their house, car and streetlights as Glenn passed overhead. The city repeated the act when Glenn rode the Space Shuttle in 1998.) The mission, which Glenn called the "best day of his life", renewed U.S. confidence. His flight occurred while the U.S. and the Soviet Union were embroiled in the Cold War and competing in the Space Race.

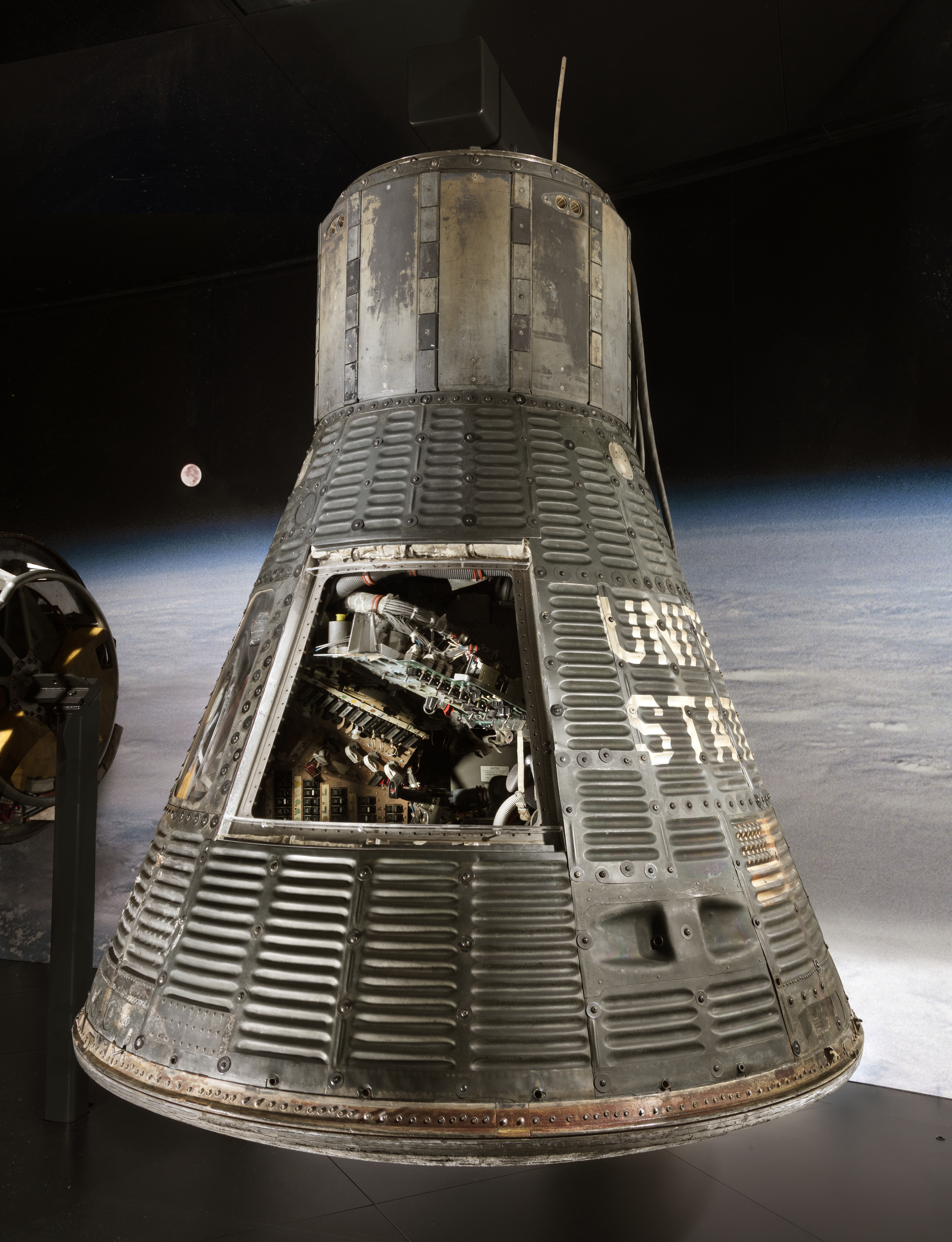
Friendship 7 is currently displayed at the National Air and Space Museum.

As the first American in orbit, Glenn became a national hero, met President John F. Kennedy, and received a ticker-tape parade in New York reminiscent of those honoring Charles Lindbergh and other heroes. He became "so valuable to the nation as an iconic figure", according to NASA administrator Charles Bolden, that Kennedy would not "risk putting him back in space again." Glenn's fame and political potential were noted by the Kennedys, and he became a friend of the Kennedy family. On February 23, 1962, President Kennedy gave him the NASA Distinguished Service Medal for his Friendship 7 flight. Upon receiving the award, Glenn said, "I would like to consider I was a figurehead for this whole big, tremendous effort, and I am very proud of the medal I have on my lapel." Glenn also received his sixth Distinguished Flying Cross for his efforts. He was among the first group of astronauts to be awarded the Congressional Space Medal of Honor. The award was presented to him by President Jimmy Carter in 1978. After his 1962 spaceflight, NASA proposed giving Glenn the Medal of Honor, but Glenn did not think that would be appropriate. Instead, he was awarded the Congressional Space Medal of Honor. His military and space awards were stolen from his home in 1977, and he remarked that he would keep this medal in a safe.

=== Comments about women in space ===
In 1962, NASA contemplated recruiting women to the astronaut corps via the Mercury 13, but Glenn gave a speech before the House Space Committee detailing his opposition to sending women into space, in which he said:

I think this gets back to the way our social order is organized, really. It is just a fact. The men go off and fight the wars and fly the airplanes and come back and help design and build and test them. The fact that women are not in this field is a fact of our social order.

In May 1965, after he left NASA, Glenn was quoted in the Miami Herald as saying NASA "offer a serious chance for space women" as scientist astronauts.

NASA had no official policy prohibiting women, but the requirement that astronauts had to be test pilots or have jet pilot experience effectively excluded them. NASA dropped this requirement when it selected scientist astronauts in 1965, but did not select any women as astronauts until 1978, when six women were selected, none as pilots. In June 1963, the Soviet Union launched a female cosmonaut, Valentina Tereshkova, into orbit. After Tereshkova, no women of any nationality flew in space again until August 1982, when the Soviet Union launched pilot-cosmonaut Svetlana Savitskaya. During the late 1970s, Glenn reportedly supported Space Shuttle mission specialist Judith Resnik in her career.

== Political campaigning ==
=== 1964 Senate campaign ===
At 42, Glenn was the oldest member of the astronaut corps and would likely be close to 50 by the time the lunar landings took place. During Glenn's training, NASA psychologists determined that he was the astronaut best suited for public life. Attorney General Robert F. Kennedy suggested to Glenn and his wife in December 1962 that he run for the 1964 United States Senate election in Ohio, challenging aging incumbent Stephen M. Young (1889–1984) in the Democratic primary election. As it seemed unlikely that he would be selected for Project Apollo missions, he resigned from NASA on January 16, 1964, and announced his Democratic Party candidacy for the U.S. Senate from his home state of Ohio the following day, becoming the first astronaut-politician. Glenn was still a Marine and had plenty of unused leave time, so he elected to use it while he waited for his retirement papers to go through.

To avoid partisanship, NASA quickly closed Glenn's agency office. The New York Times reported that while many Ohioans were skeptical of Glenn's qualifications for the Senate, he could defeat Young in the Democratic primary; whether he could defeat Representative Robert Taft Jr., the likely Republican candidate, in the general election was much less clear. In late February he was hospitalized for a concussion sustained in a fall against a bathtub while attempting to fix a mirror in a hotel room; an inner-ear injury from the accident left him unable to campaign. Both his wife and Scott Carpenter campaigned on his behalf during February and March, but doctors gave Glenn a recovery time of one year. Glenn did not want to win solely because of his astronaut fame, so he dropped out of the race on March 30.

Glenn was still on leave from the Marine Corps, and he withdrew his papers to retire so he could keep a salary and health benefits. Glenn was on the list of potential candidates to be promoted to full colonel, but he notified the commandant of the Marine Corps of his intention to retire so another Marine could receive the promotion. President Johnson later decided to promote Glenn to full colonel status without taking someone else's slot. He retired as a colonel on January 1, 1965. Glenn was approached by RC Cola to join their public relations department, but Glenn declined it because he wanted to be involved with a business and not just the face of it. The company revised their offer and offered Glenn a vice president of corporate development position, as well as a place on the board of directors. The company later expanded Glenn's role, promoting him to president of Royal Crown International. A Senate seat was open in 1968, and Glenn was asked about his current political aspirations. He said he had no current plan, and "Let's talk about it one of these days." Glenn also said that a 1970 Senate run was a possibility.

In 1973, he and a friend bought a Holiday Inn near Disney World. The success of Disney World expanded to their business, and the pair built three more hotels. One of Glenn's business partners was Henri Landwirth, a Holocaust survivor who became his best friend. He remembered learning about Landwirth's background: "Henri doesn't talk about it much. It was years before he spoke about it with me and then only because of an accident. We were down in Florida during the space program. Everyone was wearing short-sleeved Ban-Lon shirts—everyone but Henri. Then one day I saw Henri at the pool and noticed the number on his arm. I told Henri that if it were me I'd wear that number like a medal with a spotlight on it."

=== 1970 Senate campaign ===
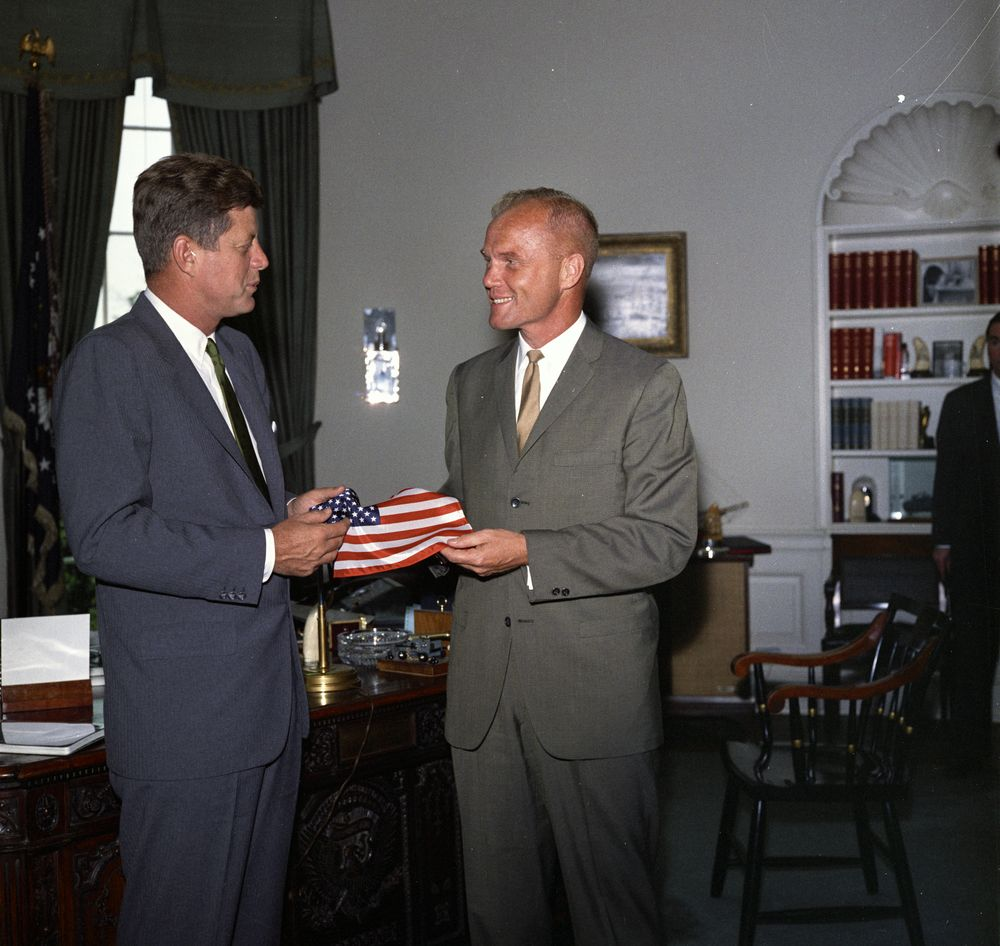
Glenn presents President Kennedy with an American flag he carried inside his space suit on Friendship 7.

Glenn remained close to the Kennedy family, and campaigned for Robert F. Kennedy during his 1968 presidential campaign. In 1968, Glenn was in Kennedy's hotel suite when Kennedy heard he had won California. Glenn was supposed to go with him to celebrate but decided not to as there would be many people there. Kennedy went downstairs to make his victory speech and was assassinated. Glenn and Annie went with Kennedy to the hospital, and the next morning took Kennedy's children home to Virginia. Glenn was later a pallbearer at the funeral in New York.

In 1970, Young did not seek reelection and the seat was open. Businessman Howard Metzenbaum, Young's former campaign manager, was backed by the Ohio Democratic Party and major labor unions, which provided him a significant funding advantage over Glenn. Glenn's camp persuaded him to be thrifty during the primary so he could save money for the general election. By the end of the primary campaign, Metzenbaum was spending four times as much as Glenn. Glenn was defeated in the Democratic primary by Metzenbaum (who received 46.3 percent of the vote to Glenn's 44.9 percent). Some prominent Democrats said Glenn was a "hapless political rube", and one newspaper called him "the ultimate square".

Metzenbaum lost the general election to Robert Taft Jr. Glenn remained active in the political scene following his defeat. Governor John J. Gilligan appointed Glenn to be the chairman of the Citizens Task Force on Environmental Protection in 1970. The task force was created to survey environmental problems in the state and released a report in 1971 detailing the issues. The meetings and the final report of the task force were major contributors to the formation of Ohio's Environmental Protection Agency.

=== 1974 Senate campaign ===
In 1973, President Nixon ordered Attorney General Elliot Richardson to fire Watergate special prosecutor Archibald Cox. Richardson refused and resigned in protest, triggering the Saturday Night massacre. Ohio senator William Saxbe, elected in 1968, was appointed attorney general. Both Glenn and Metzenbaum sought the vacated seat, which was to be filled by Governor John Gilligan. Gilligan was planning on a presidential or vice-presidential run in the near future, and offered Glenn the lieutenant governor position, with the thought that Glenn would ascend to governor when Gilligan was elected to a higher position. The Ohio Democratic Party backed this solution to avoid what was expected to be a divisive primary battle between Metzenbaum and Glenn. He declined, denouncing their attempts as "bossism" and "blackmail". Glenn's counteroffer suggested that Gilligan fill the position with someone other than Metzenbaum or Glenn so neither would have an advantage going into the 1974 election. Metzenbaum's campaign agreed to back Gilligan in his governor re-election campaign, and Metzenbaum was subsequently appointed in January 1974 to the vacated seat. At the end of Saxbe's term, Glenn challenged Metzenbaum in the primary for the Ohio Senate seat.

Glenn's campaign changed their strategy after the 1970 election. In 1970, Glenn won most of the counties in Ohio but lost in those with larger populations. The campaign changed its focus, and worked primarily in the large counties. In the primary, Metzenbaum contrasted his strong business background with Glenn's military and astronaut credentials and said that his opponent had "never held a payroll". Glenn's reply became known as the "Gold Star Mothers" speech. He told Metzenbaum to go to a veterans' hospital and "look those men with mangled bodies in the eyes and tell them they didn't hold a job. You go with me to any Gold Star mother and you look her in the eye and tell her that her son did not hold a job". He defeated Metzenbaum 54 to 46 percent before defeating Ralph Perk (the Republican mayor of Cleveland) in a landslide in the general election, winning every county in the state and beginning a Senate career which would continue until 1999.

=== 1976 vice presidential consideration ===
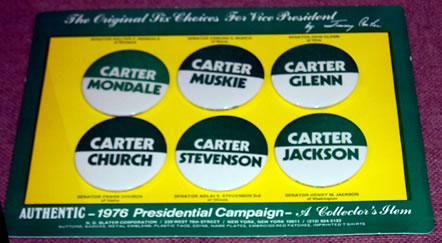
Buttons of Carter's options for vice president

After Jimmy Carter became the presumptive Democratic nominee for president in the 1976 election, Glenn was reported to be in consideration to be Carter's running mate because he was a senator in a pivotal state and for his fame and straightforwardness. Some thought he was too much like Carter, partially because they both had military backgrounds, and he did not have enough experience to become president. Barbara Jordan was the first keynote speaker at the Democratic National Convention. Her speech electrified the crowd and was filled with applause and standing ovations. Glenn's keynote address immediately followed Jordan's, and he failed to impress the delegates. Walter Cronkite described it as "dull", and other delegates complained that he was hard to hear. Carter called Glenn to inform him the nomination was going to another candidate and later nominated the veteran politician Walter Mondale. It was also reported that Carter's wife thought Annie Glenn, who had a stutter, would hurt the campaign.

=== 1980 Senate campaign ===
In his first reelection campaign, Glenn ran opposed in the primary for the 1980 Senate election. His opponents, engineer Francis Hunstiger and ex-teacher Frances Waterman, were not well-known and poorly funded. His opponents spent only a few thousand dollars on the campaign, while Glenn spent $700,000. Reporters noted that for a race he was likely to win, Glenn was spending a lot of time and money on the campaign. His chief strategist responded to the remarks saying, "It's the way he does things. He takes nothing for granted." Glenn won the primary by a landslide, with 934,230 of the 1.09 million votes.

Jim Betts, who ran unopposed in the Republican primary, challenged Glenn for his seat. Betts publicly stated that Glenn's policies were part of the reason for inflation increases and a lower standard of living. Betts's campaign also attacked Glenn's voting record, saying that he often voted for spending increases. Glenn's campaign's response was that he has been a part of over 3,000 roll calls and "any one of them could be taken out of context". Glenn was projected to win the race easily, and won by the largest margin ever for an Ohio Senator, defeating Betts by over 40 percent.

=== 1984 presidential campaign ===
Glenn was unhappy with how divided the country was, and thought labels like conservative and liberal increased the divide. He considered himself a centrist. Glenn thought a more centrist president would help unite the country. Glenn believed his experience as a senator from Ohio was ideal because of the state's diversity. Glenn thought that Ted Kennedy could win the election, but after Kennedy's announcement in late 1982 that he would not seek the presidency, Glenn thought he had a much better chance of winning. He hired a media consultant to help him with his speaking style.

Glenn announced his candidacy for president on April 21, 1983, in the John Glenn High School gymnasium. He started out the campaign out-raising the front-runner, Mondale. He also polled the highest of any Democrat against Reagan. During the fall of 1983, The Right Stuff, a film about the Mercury Seven astronauts, was released. Reviewers saw Ed Harris's portrayal of Glenn as heroic and his staff began to publicize the film to the press. One reviewer said that "Harris's depiction helped transform Glenn from a history-book figure into a likable, thoroughly adoration-worthy Hollywood hero," turning him into a big-screen icon. Others considered the movie to be damaging to Glenn's campaign, serving as only a reminder that Glenn's most significant achievement had occurred decades earlier. Glenn's autobiography said the film "had a chilling effect on the campaign."

William White managed Glenn's campaign until his replacement by Jerry Vento on January 26, 1984. Glenn's campaign decided to forgo the traditional campaigning in early caucuses and primaries and focus on building campaign offices nationwide. He opened offices in 43 states by January 1984. Glenn's campaign spent a significant amount of money on television advertising in Iowa, and Glenn chose not to attend an Iowan debate on farm issues. He finished fifth in the Iowa caucus and went on to lose New Hampshire. Glenn's campaign continued into Super Tuesday, and he lost there as well. He announced his withdrawal from the race on March 16, 1984. After Mondale defeated him for the nomination, Glenn carried $3 million in campaign debt for over 20 years before receiving a reprieve from the Federal Election Commission.

=== 1986 Senate campaign ===
Glenn's Senate seat was challenged by Thomas Kindness. Kindness was unopposed in his primary, while Glenn faced Lyndon LaRouche supporter Don Scott. LaRouche supporters had been recently elected in Illinois, but the Ohio Democratic Party chairman did not think it was likely they would see the same success in Ohio. LaRouche was known for his fringe theories, such as the queen of England being a drug dealer. Kindness spoke to his supporters and warned them against LaRouche candidates. He issued a statement telling voters to reject LaRouche candidates in both Republican and Democratic primaries. Glenn won the primary contest with 88% of the vote.

With the primary complete, Glenn began his campaign against Kindness. Glenn believed he and other Democrats were the targets of a negative campaign thought up by the GOP strategists in Washington. Kindness focused on Glenn's campaign debts for his failed presidential run and the fact he stopped payments on it while campaigning for the Senate seat. After winning the race with 62% of the vote, Glenn remarked, "We proved that in 1986, they couldn't kill Glenn with Kindness."

=== 1992 Senate campaign ===
In 1992, Republican Mike DeWine won the Republican primary and challenged Glenn in the Senate election. Glenn ran unopposed in the primary. DeWine's campaign focused on the need for change and for term limits for senators. This would be Glenn's fourth term as senator. DeWine also criticized Glenn's campaign debts, using a bunny dressed as an astronaut beating a drum, with an announcer saying, "He just keeps owing and owing and owing," a play on the Energizer Bunny. During a debate, Glenn asked DeWine to stop his negative campaign ads, saying "This has been the most negative campaign." DeWine responded that he would if Glenn would disclose how he spent the money he received from Charles Keating, fallout from Glenn being named one of the Keating Five. Glenn won the Senate seat, with 2.4 million votes to DeWine's 2 million votes. It was DeWine's first-ever campaign loss. DeWine later worked on the intelligence committee with Glenn and watched his second launch into space.

== U.S. Senate (1974–1999) ==
=== Committee on Governmental Affairs ===
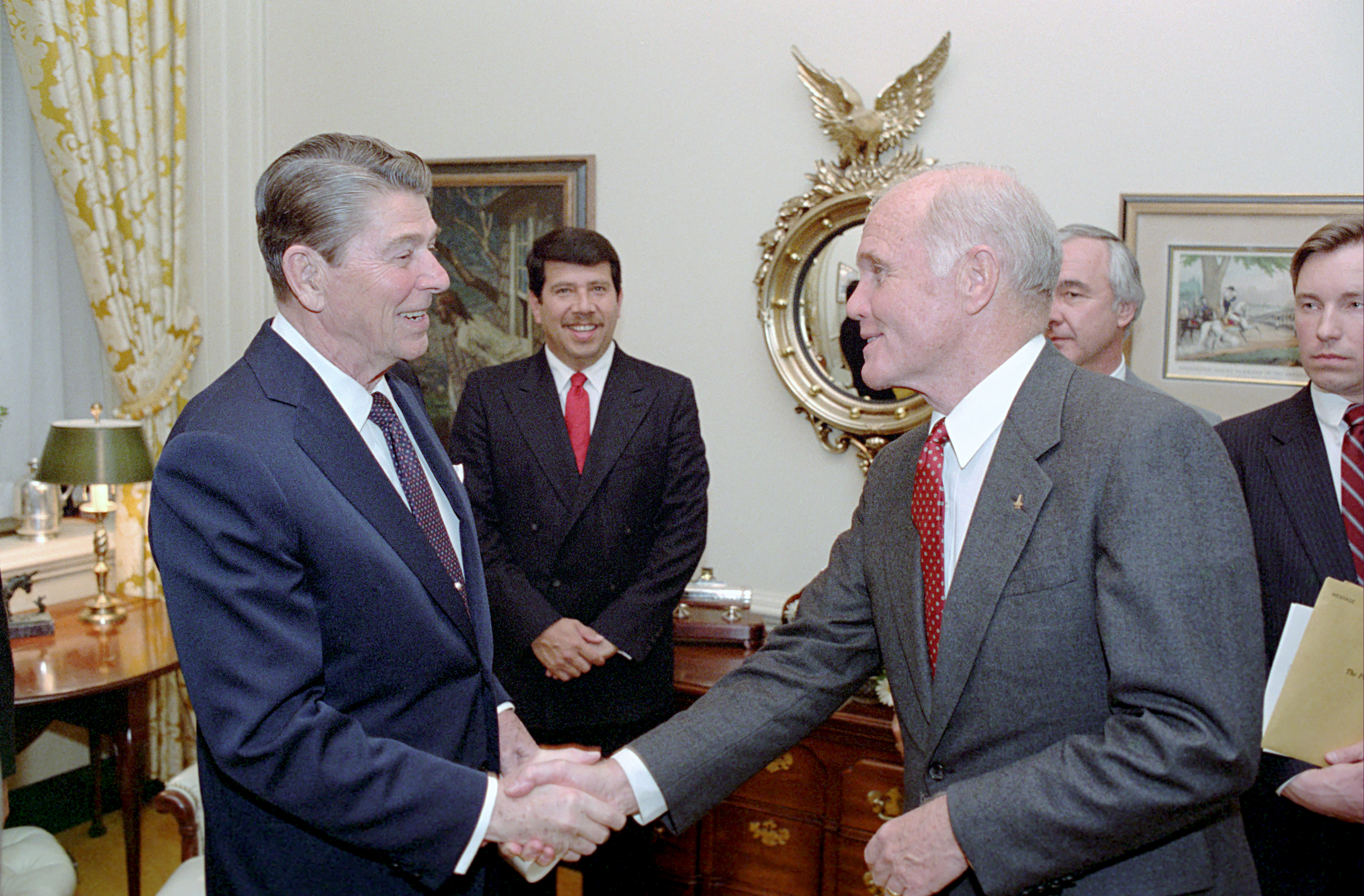
Glenn shaking hands with President Ronald Reagan in 1986

Glenn requested to be assigned to two committees during his first year as senator: the Government Operations Committee (later known as the Committee on Governmental Affairs), and the Foreign Relations Committee. He was immediately assigned to the Government Operations Committee and waited for a seat on the Foreign Relations Committee. In 1977, Glenn wanted to chair the Energy, Nuclear Proliferation, and Federal Services Subcommittee of the Governmental Affairs Committee. Abraham Ribicoff, chair of the Governmental Affairs Committee, said he could chair the subcommittee if he also chaired the less popular Federal Services Subcommittee, which was in charge of the U.S. Postal Service. Previous chairs of the Federal Services Subcommittee had lost elections in part because of negative campaigns associated with the poorly regarded mail service to the chairmen, but Glenn accepted the offer and became the chair of both subcommittees. One of his goals as a new senator was developing environmental policies. Glenn introduced bills on energy policy to try to counter the energy crisis in the 70s. Glenn also introduced legislation promoting nuclear non-proliferation and was the chief author of the Nuclear Non-Proliferation Act of 1978, the first of six major pieces of legislation that he produced on the subject.

Glenn chaired the Committee on Governmental Affairs from 1987 to 1995. It was in this role that he discovered safety and environmental problems with the nation's nuclear weapons facilities. Glenn was made aware of the problem at the Fernald Feed Materials Production Center near Cincinnati and soon found that it affected sites across the nation. Glenn requested investigations from the General Accounting Office of Congress and held several hearings on the issue. He also released a report on the potential costs of hazardous waste cleanup at former nuclear weapons manufacturing facilities, known as the Glenn Report. He spent the remainder of his Senate career acquiring funding to clean up the nuclear waste left at the facilities.

Glenn also focused on reducing government waste. He created legislation to mandate CFOs for large governmental agencies. Glenn wrote a bill to add the office of the inspector general to federal agencies, to help find waste and fraud. He also created legislation intended to prevent the federal government from imposing regulations on local governments without funding. Glenn founded the Great Lakes Task Force, which helped protect the environment of the Great Lakes.

In 1995 Glenn became the ranking minority member of the Committee on Governmental Affairs. Glenn disputed the focus on illegal Chinese donations to the Democrats and asserted that Republicans also had egregious fundraising issues. The committee chair, Fred Thompson of Tennessee, disagreed and continued the investigation. Thompson and Glenn continued to work together poorly for the duration of the investigation. Thompson would give Glenn only information he was legally required to. Glenn would not authorize a larger budget and tried to expand the scope of the investigation to include members of the GOP. The investigation concluded with a Republican-written report, which Thompson described as, "... a lot of things strung together that paint a real ugly picture." The Democrats, led by Glenn, said the report "... does not support the conclusion that the China plan was aimed at, or affected, the 1996 presidential election."

Glenn was the vice chairman of the Permanent Subcommittee on Investigations, a subcommittee of the Committee on Governmental Affairs. When the Republican Party regained control of the Senate in 1996, Glenn became the ranking minority member on the Permanent Subcommittee on Investigations until he was succeeded by Carl Levin. During this time, the committee investigated issues such as fraud on the Internet, mortgage fraud, and day trading of securities.

=== Other committees and activities ===
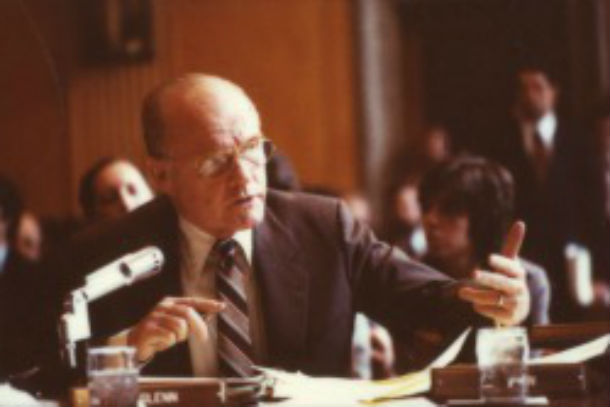
Glenn in the U.S. Senate c. 1987–1995

Glenn's father spent his retirement money battling cancer and would have lost his house if Glenn had not intervened. His father-in-law also had expensive treatments for Parkinson's disease. These health and financial issues motivated him to request a seat on the Special Committee on Aging.

Glenn was considered an expert in matters of science and technology. He was a supporter of continuing the B-1 bomber program, which he considered successful. This conflicted with President Carter's desire to fund the B-2 bomber program. Glenn did not fully support development of the B-2 because he had doubts about the feasibility of the stealth technology. He drafted a proposal to slow down the development of the B-2, which could have potentially saved money, but the measure was rejected.

Glenn joined the Foreign Relations Committee in 1978. He became the chairman of the East Asian and Pacific Affairs Subcommittee, for which he traveled to Japan, Korea, the Republic of China, and the People's Republic of China. Glenn helped to pass the Taiwan Enabling Act of 1979. The same year, Glenn's stance on the SALT II treaty caused another dispute with President Carter. Given the loss of radar listening posts in Iran, Glenn did not believe that the U.S. had the capability to monitor the Soviet Union accurately enough to verify compliance with the treaty. During the launching ceremony for the USS Ohio, he spoke about his doubts about verifying treaty compliance. First Lady Rosalynn Carter also spoke at the event, during which she criticized Glenn for speaking publicly about the issue. The Senate never ratified the treaty, in part because of the Soviet invasion of Afghanistan. Glenn served on the committee until 1985, when he traded it for the Armed Services Committee.

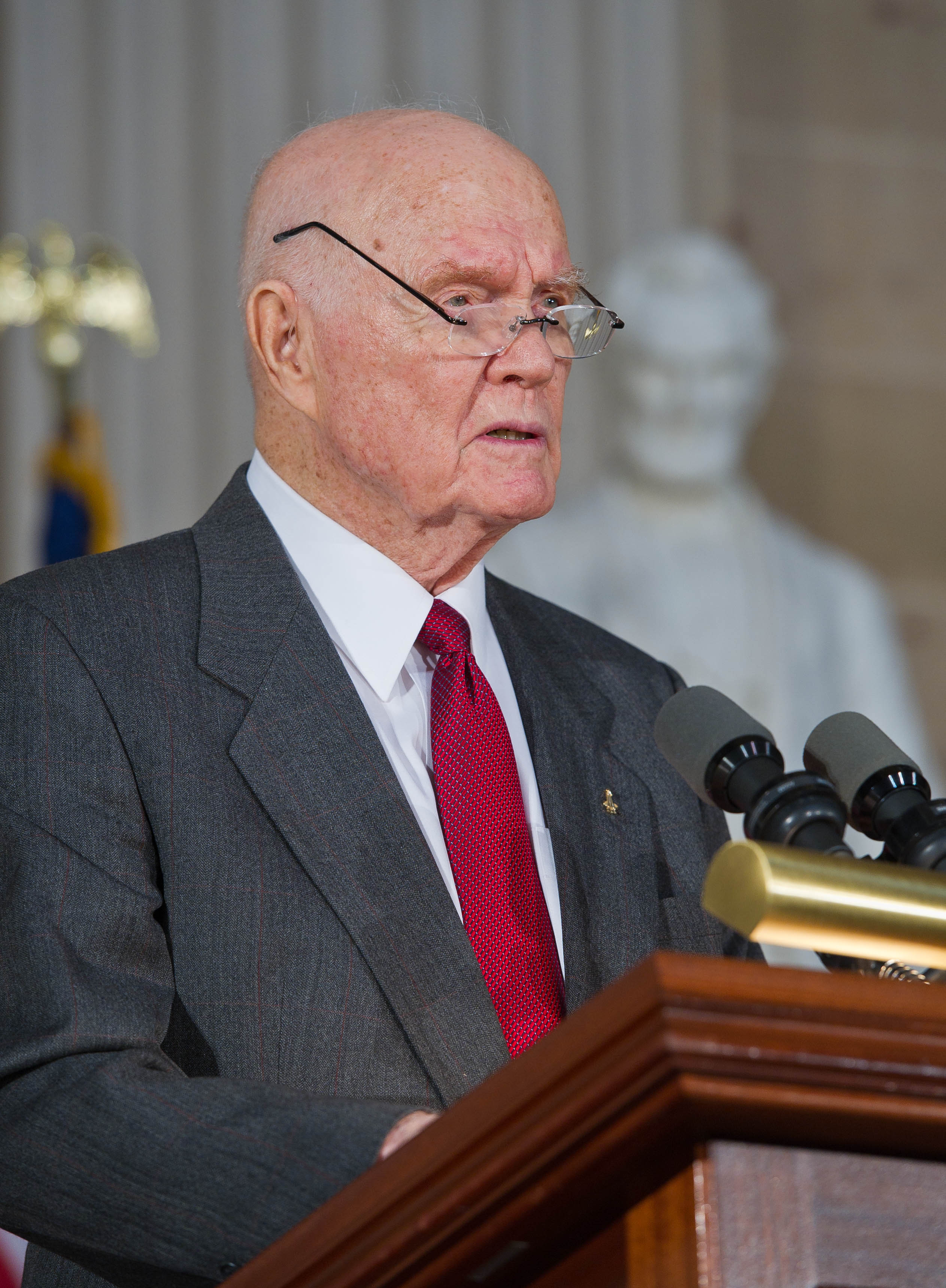
Glenn delivers remarks during a Congressional Gold Medal ceremony honoring the Apollo 11 astronauts in the Rotunda at the U.S. Capitol in 2011.

Glenn became chairman of the Manpower Subcommittee of the Armed Services Committee in 1987. He introduced legislation such as increasing pay and benefits for American troops in the Persian Gulf during the Gulf War. He served as chairman until 1993, becoming chairman of the Armed Services Subcommittee on Military Readiness and Defense Infrastructure.

=== Keating Five ===
Glenn was one of the Keating Five—the U.S. Senators involved with the savings and loan crisis—after he accepted a $200,000 campaign contribution from Lincoln Savings and Loan Association head Charles Keating. During the crisis, the senators were accused of delaying the seizure of Keating's S&L, which cost taxpayers an additional $2 billion. The combination of perceived political pressure and Keating's monetary contributions to the senators led to an investigation.

The Ethics Committee's outside counsel, Robert Bennett, wanted to eliminate Republican senator John McCain and Glenn from the investigation. The Democrats did not want to exclude McCain, as he was the only Republican being investigated, which means they could not excuse Glenn from the investigation either. McCain and Glenn were reprimanded the least of the five, as the Senate commission found that they had exercised "poor judgment". The GOP focused on Glenn's "poor judgment" rather than what Glenn saw as complete exoneration. GOP chairman Robert Bennett said, "John Glenn misjudged Charles Keating. He also misjudged the tolerance of Ohio's taxpayers, who are left to foot the bill of nearly $2 billion." After the Senate's report, Glenn said, "They so firmly put this thing to bed ... there isn't much there to fuss with. I didn't do anything wrong." In his autobiography, Glenn wrote, "outside of people close to me dying, these hearings were the low point of my life." The case cost him $520,000 in legal fees. The association of his name with the scandal made Republicans hopeful that he could be defeated in the 1992 campaign, but Glenn defeated Lieutenant Governor Mike DeWine to retain his seat.

=== Retirement ===
On February 20, 1997, which was the 35th anniversary of his Friendship 7 flight, Glenn announced that his retirement from the Senate would occur at the end of his term in January 1999. Glenn retired because of his age, noting that he would have been 83 at the end of another term and musing that "... there is still no cure for the common birthday".

== Return to space ==
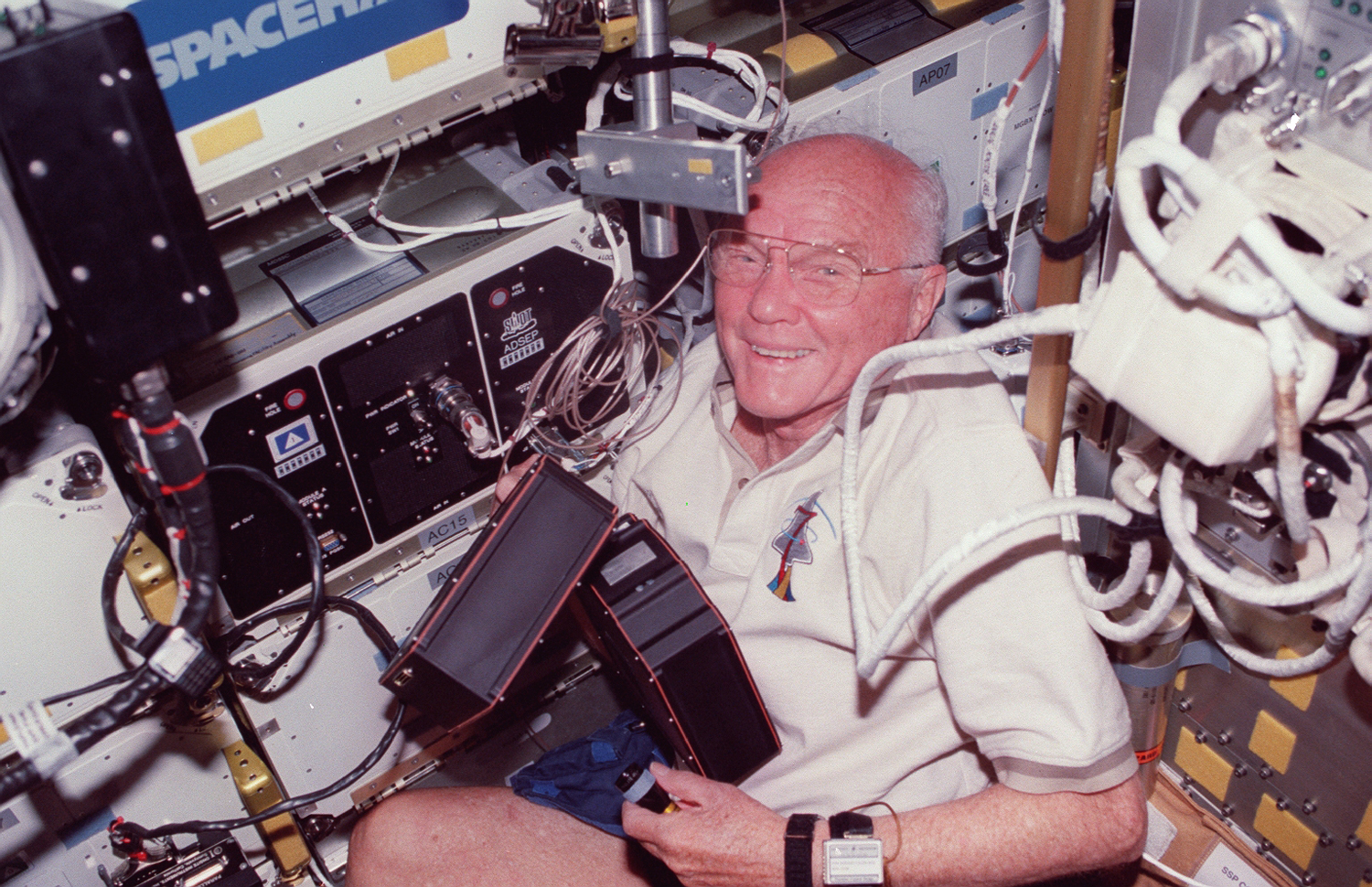
Glenn on the Space Shuttle Discovery in 1998

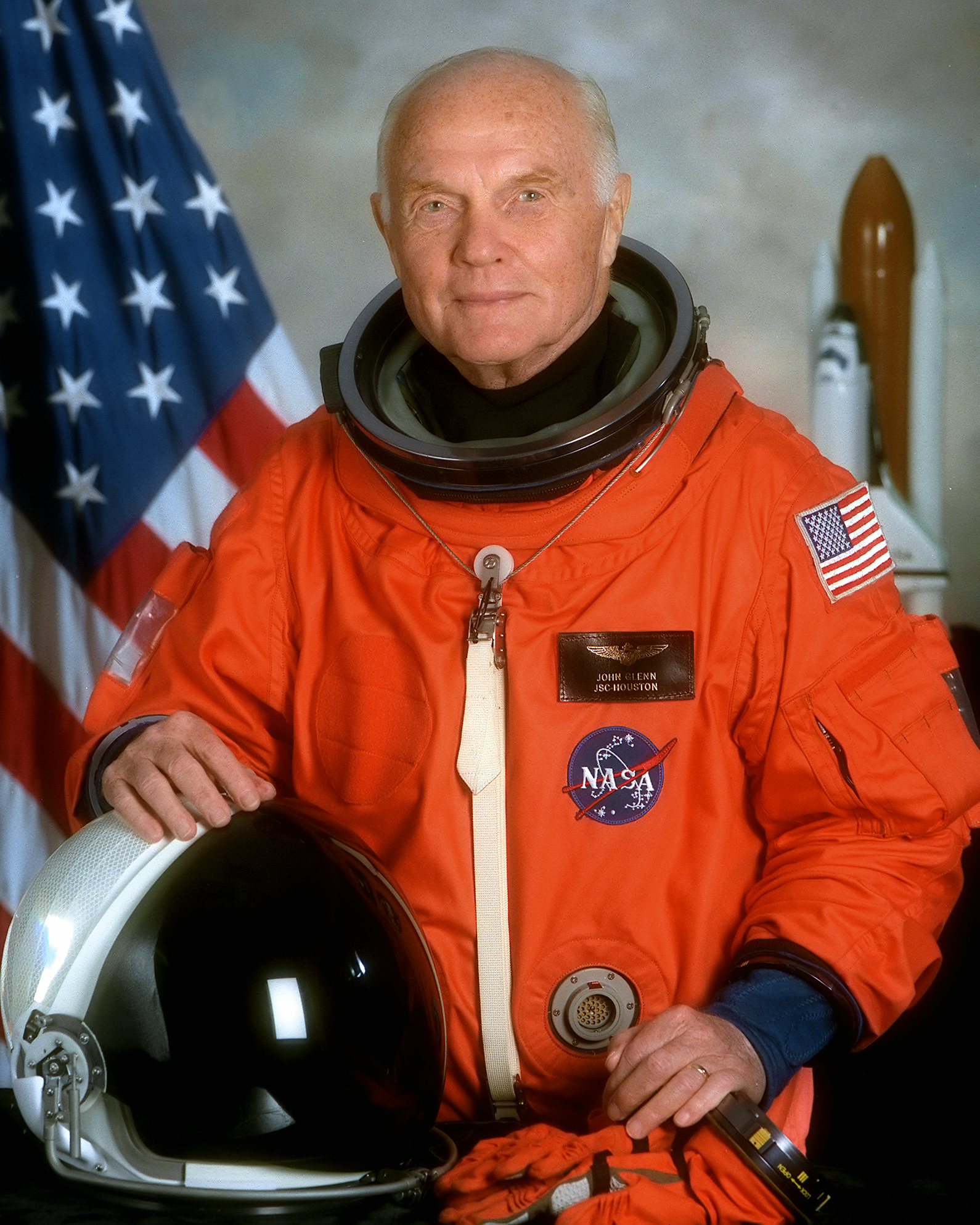
STS-95 portrait

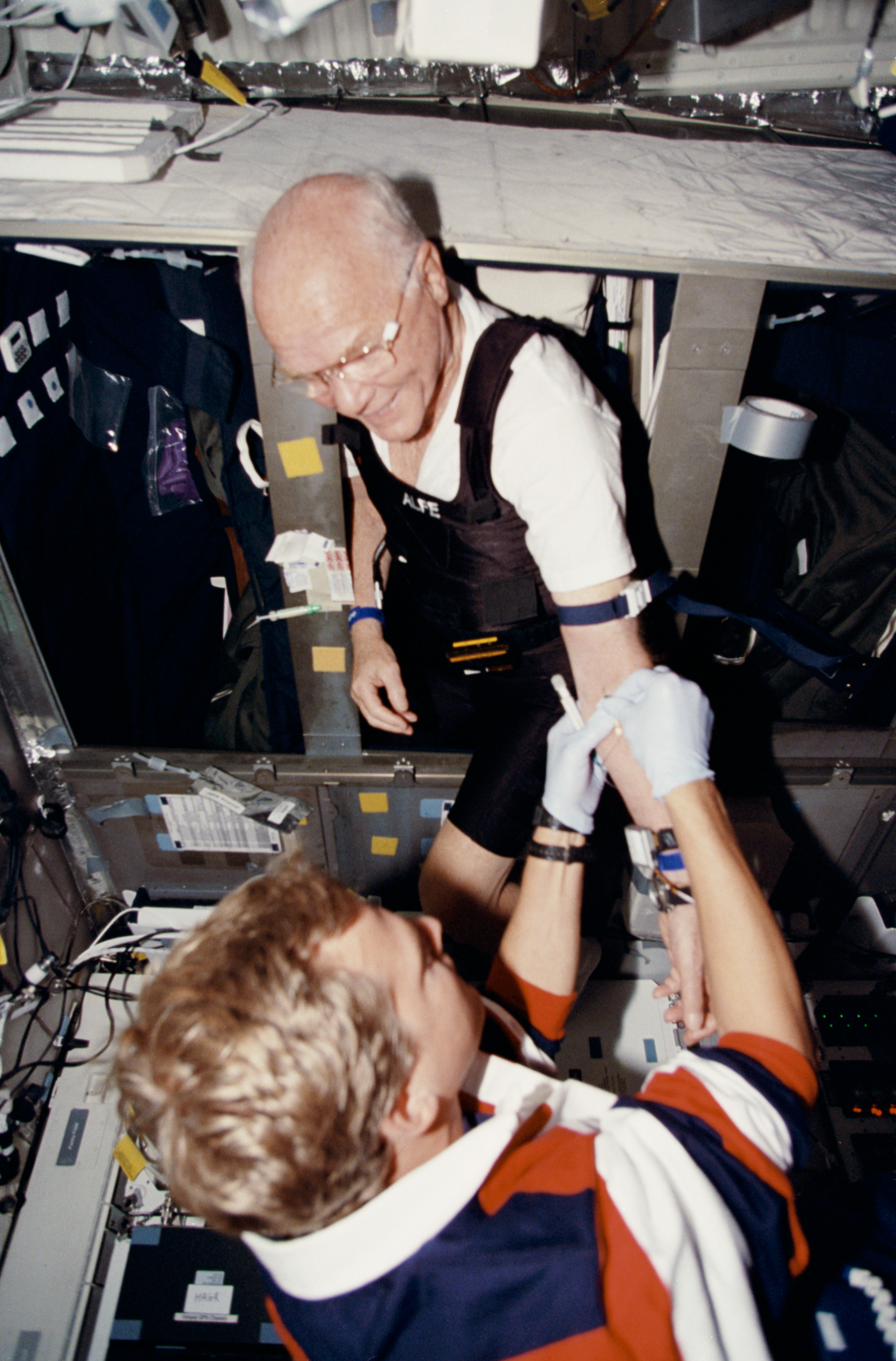
Glenn getting his blood drawn in space for an experiment

After the Space Shuttle Challenger disaster in 1986, Glenn criticized putting a "lay person in space for the purpose of gaining public support ... while the shuttle is still in its embryonic stage". He supported flying research scientists. In 1995, Glenn read Space Physiology and Medicine, a book written by NASA doctors. He realized that many changes that occur to physical attributes during space flight, such as loss of bone and muscle mass and blood plasma, are the same as changes that result from aging. Glenn thought NASA should send an older person on a shuttle mission, and that it should be him. Starting in 1995, he began lobbying NASA director Dan Goldin for the mission. Goldin said he would consider it if there was a scientific reason, and if Glenn could pass the same physical examination the younger astronauts took. Glenn performed research on the subject and passed the physical examination. On January 16, 1998, NASA Administrator Dan Goldin announced that Glenn would be part of the STS-95 crew; this made him, at age 77, the oldest person to fly in space at that time.

NASA and the National Institute of Aging (NIA) planned to use Glenn as a test subject for research, with biometrics taken before, during, and after his flight. Some experiments (in circadian rhythms, for example) compared him with the younger crew members. In addition to these tests, he was in charge of the flight's photography and videography. Glenn returned to space on the Space Shuttle on October 29, 1998, as a payload specialist on Space Shuttle Discovery. Shortly before the flight, researchers disqualified Glenn from one of the flight's two major human experiments (on the effect of melatonin) for undisclosed medical reasons; he participated in experiments on sleep monitoring and protein use. On November 6, President Bill Clinton sent a congratulatory email to Glenn aboard Discovery. This is often cited as the first email sent by a sitting U.S. president, but records exist of emails being sent by President Clinton several years earlier.

His participation in the nine-day mission was criticized by some members of the space community as a favor granted by Clinton; John Pike, director of the Federation of American Scientists' space-policy project, said: "If he was a normal person, he would acknowledge he's a great American hero and that he should get to fly on the shuttle for free ... He's too modest for that, and so he's got to have this medical research reason. It's got nothing to do with medicine".

In a 2012 interview, Glenn said he regretted that NASA did not continue its research on aging by sending additional elderly people into space. After STS-95 returned safely, its crew received a ticker-tape parade. On October 15, 1998, NASA Road 1 (the main route to the Johnson Space Center) was temporarily renamed John Glenn Parkway for several months. Glenn was awarded the NASA Space Flight Medal in 1998 for flying on STS-95. In 2001, Glenn opposed sending Dennis Tito, the world's first space tourist, to the International Space Station because Tito's trip had no scientific purpose.

== Personal life ==
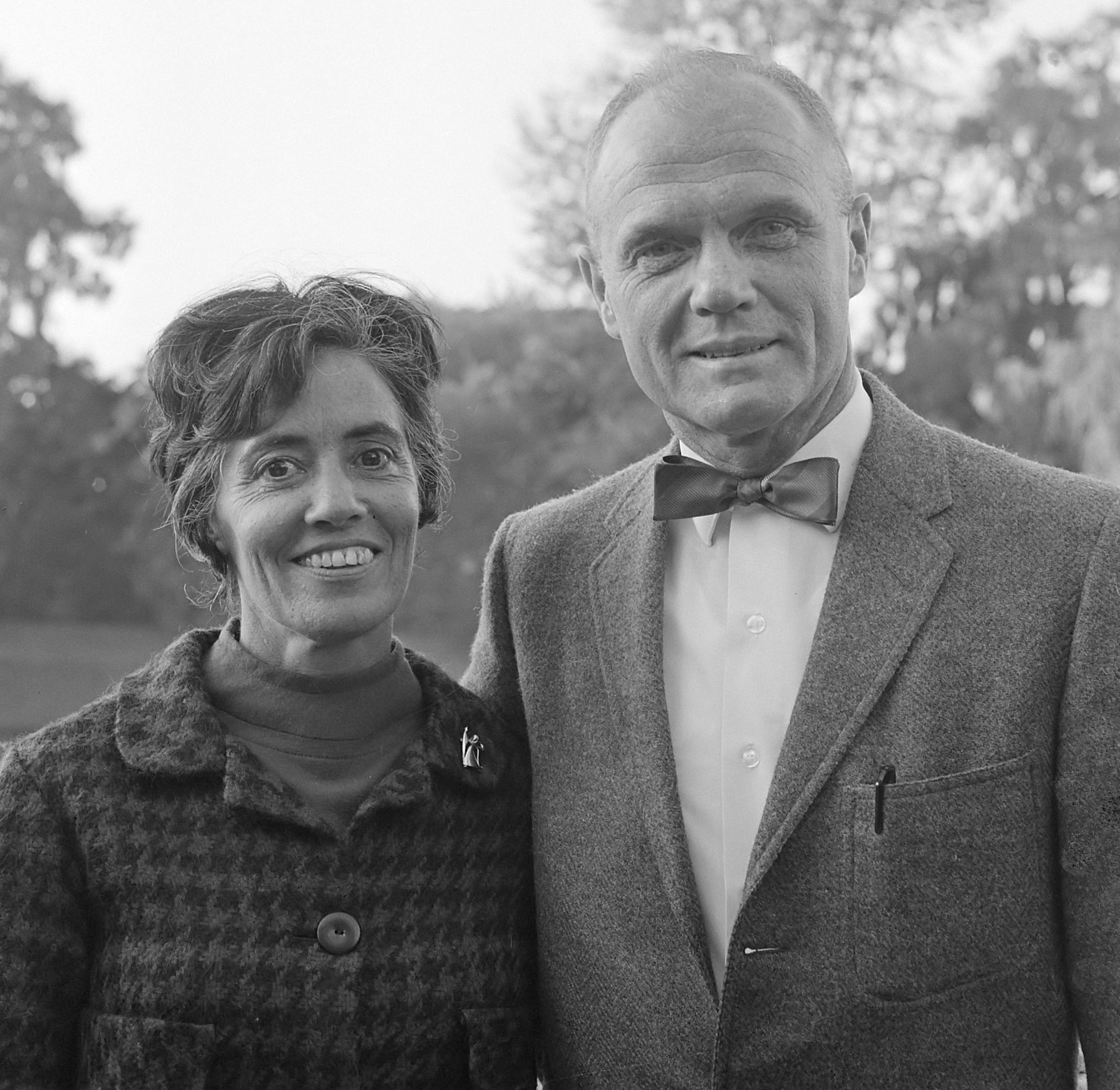
Annie and John Glenn in 1965

Glenn and Annie had two children—John David and Carolyn Ann—and two grandchildren, and remained married for 73 years until his death.

A Freemason, Glenn was a member of Concord Lodge No. 688 in New Concord, Ohio. He received all his degrees in full in a Freemason at sight ceremony from the Grand Master of Ohio in 1978, 14 years after petitioning his lodge. In 1999, Glenn became a 33rd-degree Scottish Rite Mason in the Valley of Cincinnati (NMJ). As an adult, he was honored as part of the DeMolay Legion of Honor by DeMolay International, a Masonic youth organization for boys.

Glenn was an ordained elder of the Presbyterian Church. His religious faith began before he became an astronaut and was reinforced after he traveled in space. "To look out at this kind of creation and not believe in God is to me impossible", said Glenn after his second (and final) space voyage. He saw no contradiction between belief in God and the knowledge that evolution is "a fact" and believed evolution should be taught in schools: "I don't see that I'm any less religious that I can appreciate the fact that science just records that we change with evolution and time, and that's a fact. It doesn't mean it's less wondrous and it doesn't mean that there can't be some power greater than any of us that has been behind and is behind whatever is going on."

== Public appearances ==
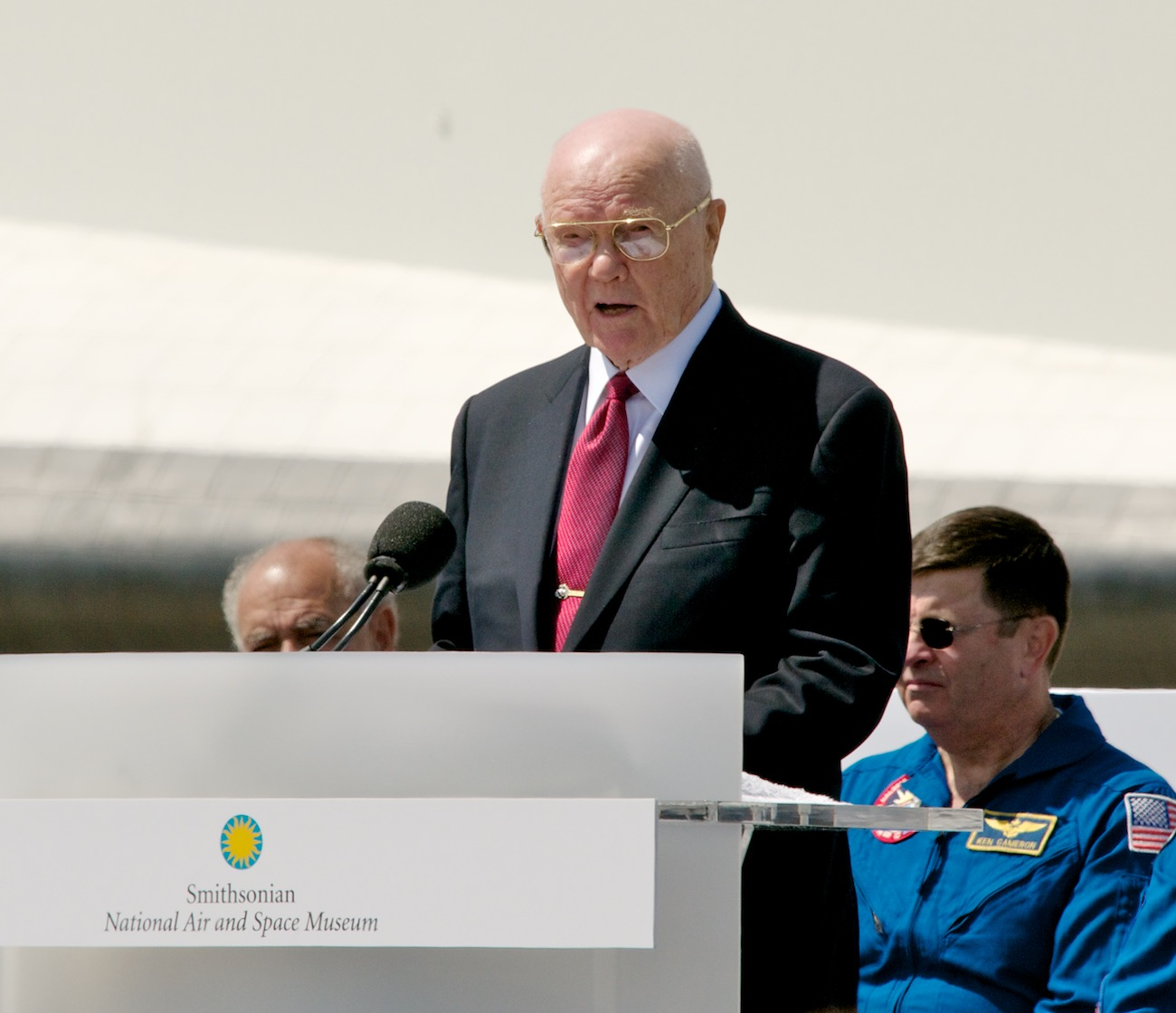
Glenn at the ceremony transferring the Space Shuttle Discovery to the Smithsonian Institution

Glenn was an honorary member of the International Academy of Astronautics and a member of the Society of Experimental Test Pilots, Marine Corps Aviation Association, Order of Daedalians, National Space Club board of trustees, National Space Society board of governors, International Association of Holiday Inns, Ohio Democratic Party, State Democratic Executive Committee, Franklin County (Ohio) Democratic Party and the 10th District (Ohio) Democratic Action Club. In 2001 he guest-starred as himself on the American television sitcom Frasier.

On September 5, 2009, John and Annie Glenn dotted the "i" in Ohio State University's Script Ohio marching band performance during the Ohio State–Navy football-game halftime show, which is normally reserved for veteran band members. To commemorate the 50th anniversary of the Friendship 7 flight on February 20, 2012, he had an unexpected opportunity to speak with the orbiting crew of the International Space Station when he was onstage with NASA Administrator Charlie Bolden at Ohio State University. On April 19, 2012, Glenn participated in the ceremonial transfer of the retired Space Shuttle Discovery from NASA to the Smithsonian Institution for permanent display at the Steven F. Udvar-Hazy Center. He used the occasion to criticize the "unfortunate" decision to end the Space Shuttle program, saying that grounding the shuttles delayed research.

== Illness and death ==
Glenn was in good health for most of his life. He retained a private pilot's license until 2011 when he was 90. In June 2014, Glenn underwent successful heart valve replacement surgery at the Cleveland Clinic. In early December 2016, he was hospitalized at the James Cancer Hospital of Ohio State University Wexner Medical Center in Columbus. According to a family source, Glenn had been in declining health, and his condition was grave; his wife and their children and grandchildren were at the hospital.

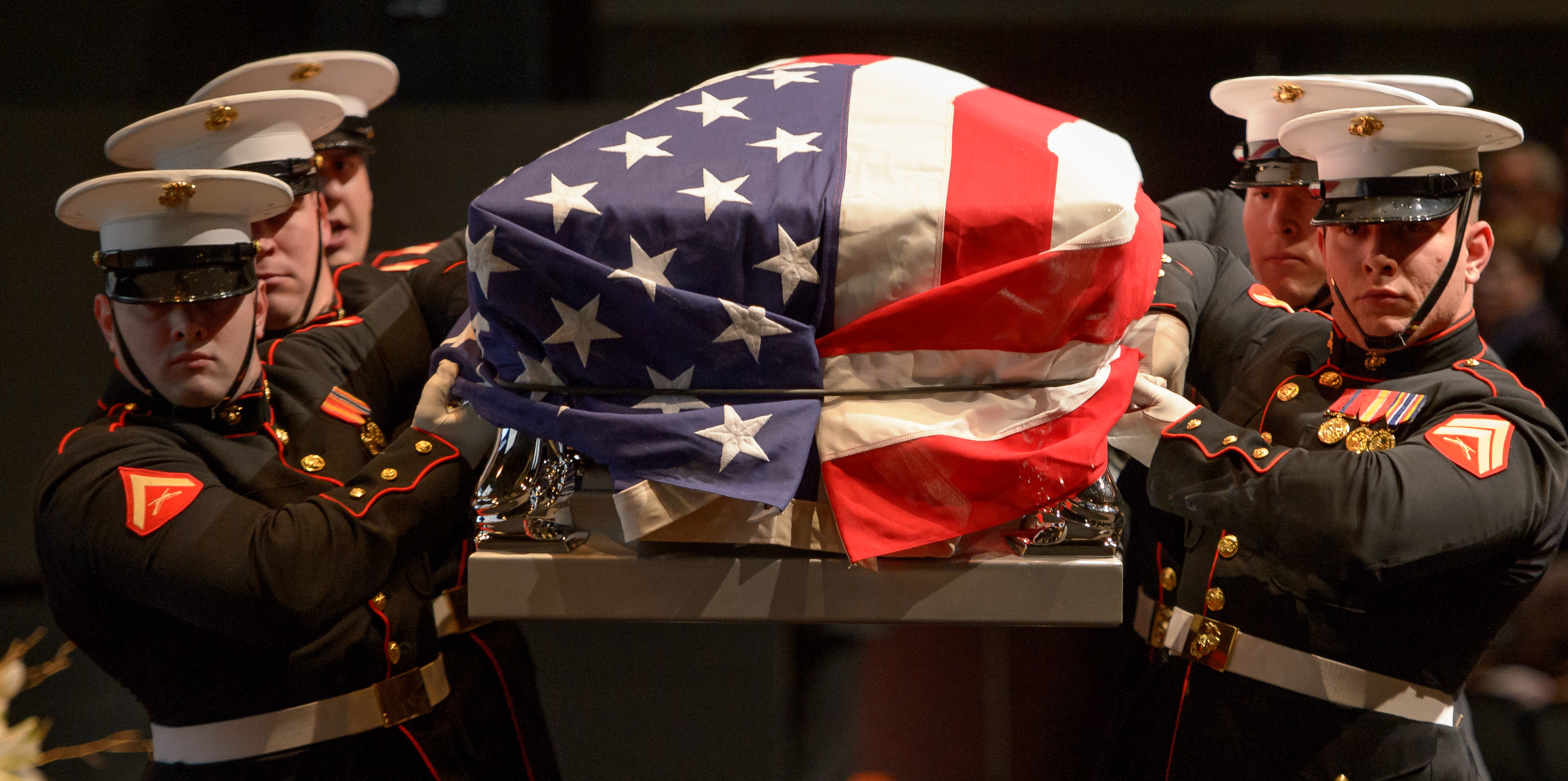
Glenn's casket carried by Marine Corps pallbearers

Glenn died on December 8, 2016, at the OSU Wexner Medical Center; he was 95 years old. No cause of death was disclosed. After his death, his body lay in state at the Ohio Statehouse. There was a memorial service at Mershon Auditorium at Ohio State University. Another memorial service was performed at Kennedy Space Center near the Heroes and Legends building. His body was interred at Arlington National Cemetery on April 6, 2017. At the time of his death, Glenn was the last surviving member of the Mercury Seven.

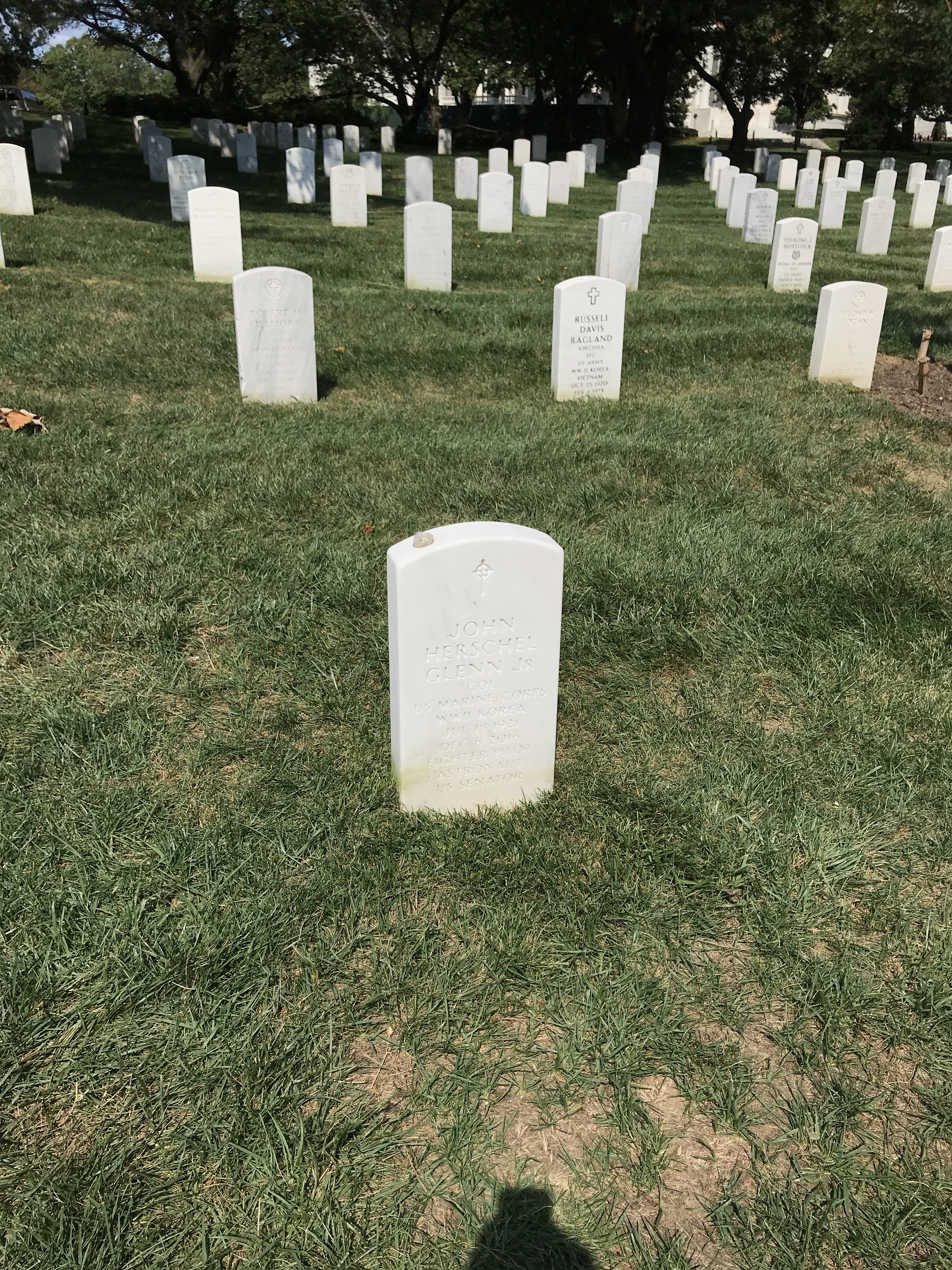
Glenn's headstone at Arlington National Cemetery

The Military Times reported that William Zwicharowski, a senior mortuary official at Dover Air Force Base, had offered to let visiting inspectors view Glenn's remains, sparking an official investigation. Zwicharowski has denied the remains were disrespected. At the conclusion of the investigation, officials said the remains were not disrespected as inspectors did not accept Zwicharowski's offer, and that Zwicharowski's actions were improper. No administrative action was taken as he had retired.

President Barack Obama said that Glenn, "the first American to orbit the Earth, reminded us that with courage and a spirit of discovery there's no limit to the heights we can reach together". Tributes were also paid by Vice President Joe Biden, President-elect Donald Trump and former Secretary of State Hillary Clinton.

The phrase "Godspeed, John Glenn", which fellow Mercury astronaut Scott Carpenter had used to hail Glenn's launch into space, became a social-media hashtag: #GodspeedJohnGlenn. Former and current astronauts added tributes; so did NASA Administrator and former shuttle astronaut Charles Bolden, who wrote: "John Glenn's legacy is one of risk and accomplishment, of history created and duty to country carried out under great pressure with the whole world watching." President Obama ordered flags to be flown at half-staff until Glenn's burial. On April 5, 2017, President Donald Trump issued presidential proclamation 9588, titled "Honoring the Memory of John Glenn".

== Awards and honors ==
Glenn was awarded the John J. Montgomery Award in 1963. Glenn received the National Geographic Society's Hubbard Medal in 1962. Glenn, along with 37 other space race astronauts, received the Ambassador of Space Exploration Award in 2006. He was also awarded the General Thomas D. White National Defense Award and the Prince of Asturias Award for International Cooperation. In 1964, Glenn received the Golden Plate Award of the American Academy of Achievement. In 2004, he received the Woodrow Wilson Award for Public Service from the Woodrow Wilson International Center for Scholars of the Smithsonian Institution and was awarded the National Collegiate Athletic Association's Theodore Roosevelt Award for 2008.

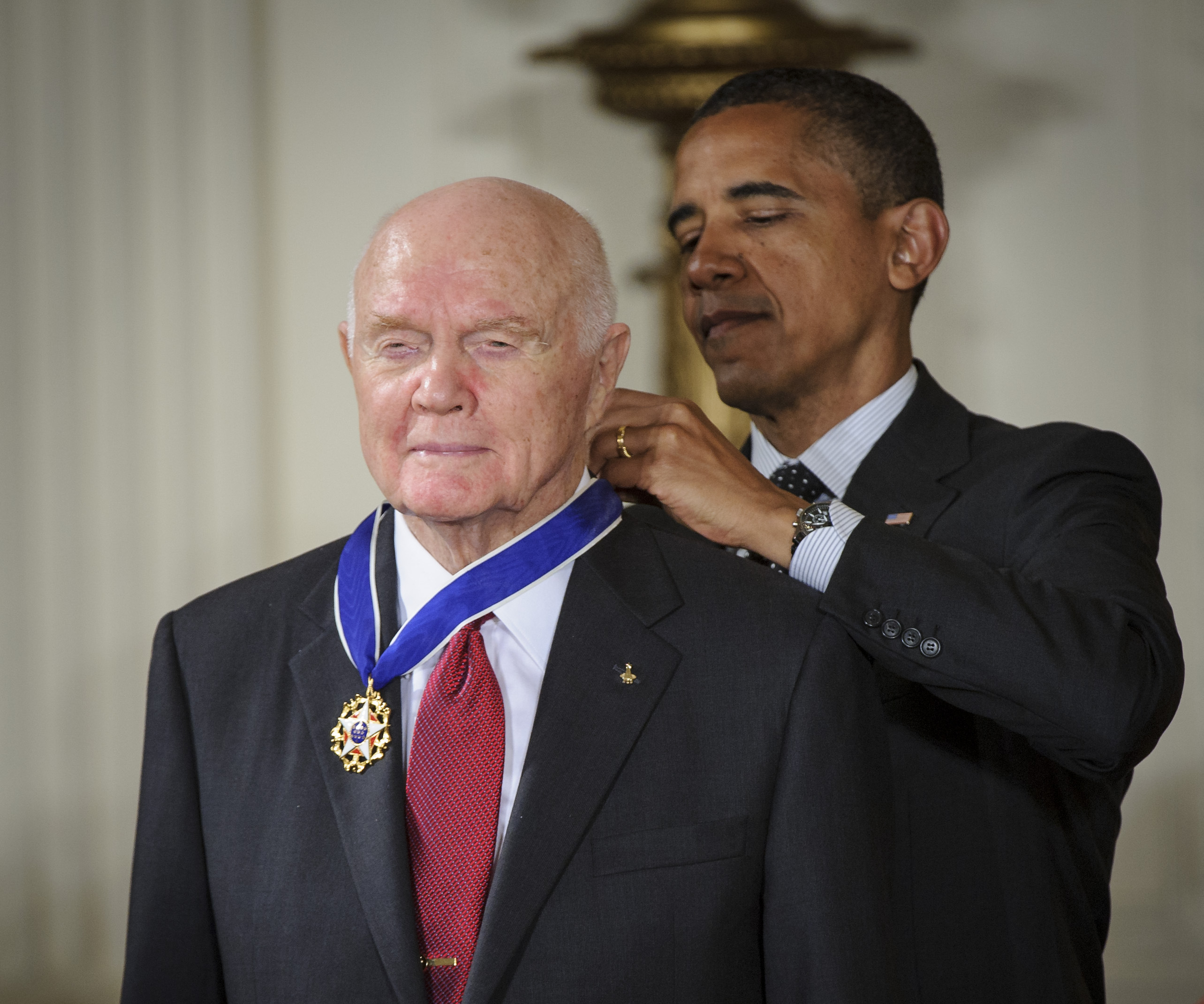
Glenn receiving the Presidential Medal of Freedom from President Barack Obama in 2012

Glenn earned the Navy's astronaut wings and the Marine Corps' Astronaut Medal. He was awarded the Congressional Gold Medal in 2011 and was among the first group of astronauts to be granted the distinction. In 2012, President Barack Obama presented Glenn with the Presidential Medal of Freedom. Glenn was the seventh astronaut to receive this distinction. The Congressional Gold Medal and the Presidential Medal of Freedom are considered the two most prestigious awards that can be bestowed on a civilian. The Society of Experimental Test Pilots awarded Glenn the Iven C. Kincheloe award in 1963, and he was inducted into the International Air & Space Hall of Fame in 1968, National Aviation Hall of Fame in 1976, the International Space Hall of Fame in 1977, and the U.S. Astronaut Hall of Fame in 1990. In 2000, he received the U.S. Senator John Heinz Award for public service by an elected or appointed official, one of the annual Jefferson Awards.

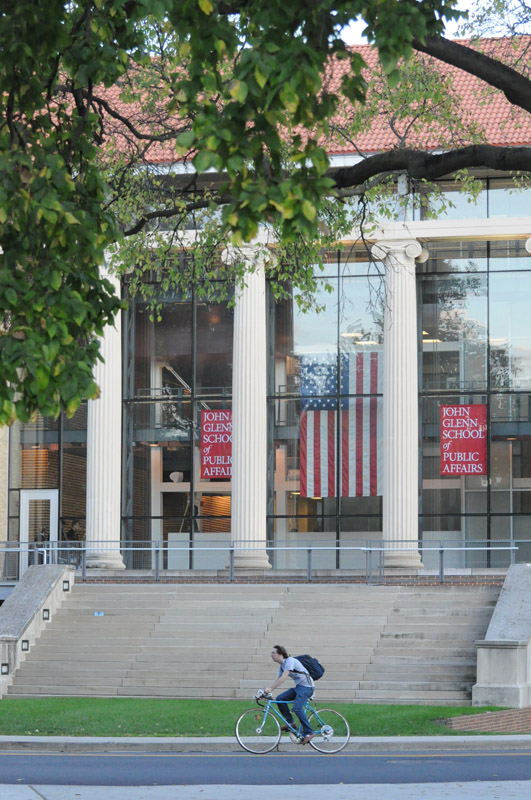
The John Glenn College of Public Affairs at the Ohio State University.

In 1961, Glenn received an honorary LL.D from Muskingum University, the college he attended before joining the military in World War II. He also received honorary doctorates from Nihon University in Tokyo; Wagner College in Staten Island, New York; Ohio Northern University; Williams College; and Brown University. In 1998, he helped found the John Glenn Institute for Public Service and Public Policy at Ohio State University to encourage public service. The institute merged with OSU's School of Public Policy and Management to become the John Glenn School of Public Affairs. He held an adjunct professorship at the school. In February 2015, it was announced that it would become the John Glenn College of Public Affairs in April.

The Glenn Research Center at Lewis Field in Cleveland is named after him, and the Senator John Glenn Highway runs along a stretch of I-480 in Ohio across from the Glenn Research Center. Colonel Glenn Highway (which passes Wright-Patterson Air Force Base and Wright State University near Dayton, Ohio), John Glenn High School in his hometown of New Concord, Elwood-John H. Glenn High School in the hamlet of Elwood, Town of Huntington, Long Island, New York, and the former Col. John Glenn Elementary in Seven Hills, Ohio, were also named for him. Colonel Glenn Road in Little Rock, Arkansas, was named for him in 1962. High schools in Westland and Bay City, Michigan; Walkerton, Indiana; and Norwalk, California bear Glenn's name. The fireboat John H. Glenn Jr., operated by the District of Columbia Fire and Emergency Medical Services Department and protecting sections of the Potomac and Anacostia Rivers which run through Washington, D.C., was named for him, as was USNS John Glenn (T-MLP-2), a mobile landing platform delivered to the U.S. Navy on March 12, 2014. In June 2016, the Port Columbus International Airport in Columbus, Ohio, was renamed John Glenn Columbus International Airport. Glenn and his family attended the ceremony, during which he spoke about how visiting the airport as a child had kindled his interest in flying. On September 12, 2016, Blue Origin announced the New Glenn, a rocket. Orbital ATK named the Cygnus space capsule used in the NASA CRS OA-7 mission to the international space station "S.S. John Glenn" in his honor. The mission successfully lifted off on April 16, 2017.

Although never a Scout himself, Glenn heavily endorsed the Boy Scouts. His son, John David, attained the coveted rank of Eagle Scout that many of Glenn's aviator peers also achieved.

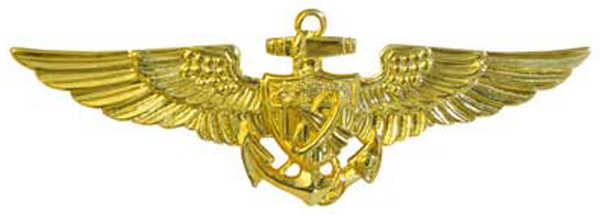

Naval Aviator Astronaut Insignia
Distinguished Flying Cross with three gold stars and one bronze cluster
Air Medal with one silver and 2 gold stars and two silver clusters	Navy Presidential Unit Citation	Navy Unit Commendation
Presidential Medal of Freedom	Congressional Space Medal of Honor	NASA Distinguished Service Medal
NASA Space Flight Medal with one oak leaf cluster	Marine Corps Expeditionary Medal	China Service Medal
American Campaign Medal	Asiatic-Pacific Campaign Medal with one star	World War II Victory Medal
Navy Occupation Service Medal with "ASIA" clasp	National Defense Service Medal with one star	Korean Service Medal with two campaign stars
Presidential Unit Citation (Korea)	United Nations Korea Medal	Korean War Service Medal

== Legacy ==
Glenn's public life and legacy began when he received his first ticker-tape parade for breaking the transcontinental airspeed record. As a senator, he used his military background to write legislation to reduce nuclear proliferation. He also focused on reducing government waste. Buzz Aldrin wrote that Glenn's Friendship 7 flight "... helped to galvanize the country's will and resolution to surmount significant technical challenges of human spaceflight."

President Barack Obama said, "With John's passing, our nation has lost an icon and Michelle and I have lost a friend. John spent his life breaking barriers, from defending our freedom as a decorated Marine Corps fighter pilot in World War II and Korea, to setting a transcontinental speed record, to becoming, at age 77, the oldest human to touch the stars." Obama issued a presidential proclamation on December 9, 2016, ordering the U.S. flag to be flown at half-staff in Glenn's memory. NASA administrator Charles Bolden said: "Senator Glenn's legacy is one of risk and accomplishment, of history created and duty to country carried out under great pressure with the whole world watching".

Party political offices
Preceded by John J. Gilligan	Democratic nominee for U.S. Senator from Ohio (Class 3); 1974, 1980, 1986, 1992	Succeeded by Mary O. Boyle
Preceded by Reubin Askew	Keynote Speaker of the Democratic National Convention; 1976; Served alongside: Barbara Jordan	Succeeded by Mo Udall
U.S. Senate
Preceded by Howard Metzenbaum	United States Senator (Class 3) from Ohio; 1974–1999; Served alongside: Robert Taft, Howard Metzenbaum, Mike DeWine	Succeeded by George Voinovich
Preceded by William Roth	Chair of Senate Governmental Affairs Committee; 1987–1995	Succeeded by William Roth
Preceded by William Roth	Ranking Member of the Senate Governmental Affairs Committee; 1995–1999	Succeeded by Joe Lieberman
Honorary titles
Preceded by Edward Brooke	Oldest living United States senator (current or former); 2015–2016	Succeeded by Fritz Hollings
