= Jim Betts (politician) =

American politician

Member of the Ohio House of Representatives from the 3rd district
- In office January 3, 1975 – December 31, 1981
- Preceded by: George Mastics
- Succeeded by: Jim Petro

Personal details
- Born: 1932 or 1933 (age 93–94)
- Party: Republican

James E. Betts (born circa 1932) is an attorney and politician from Ohio. He served in the Ohio House of Representatives from 1975 to 1980. He ran against incumbent U.S. Senator John Glenn in 1980. He ran in 1982 for lieutenant governor as the running mate of Bud Brown but lost to the Democratic ticket of Dick Celeste and Myrl Shoemaker.

Betts graduated from the Ohio State University in 1954 with a B.A. in communications and from Cleveland State University in 1976 with a Juris Doctor degree. He was admitted to the Ohio bar in 1976. Governor George Voinovich in 1991 appointed Betts chairman of the Ohio High Speed Rail Authority. Betts worked for changes in Ohio's system for funding public schools.

Party political offices
Preceded by Ralph Perk	Republican nominee for U.S. Senator from Ohio (Class 3); 1980	Succeeded by Tom Kindness
Preceded by George Voinovich	Republican nominee for Lieutenant Governor of Ohio; 1982	Succeeded by Bob Taft
