= 1980 United States Senate election in Ohio =

- November 4, 1980
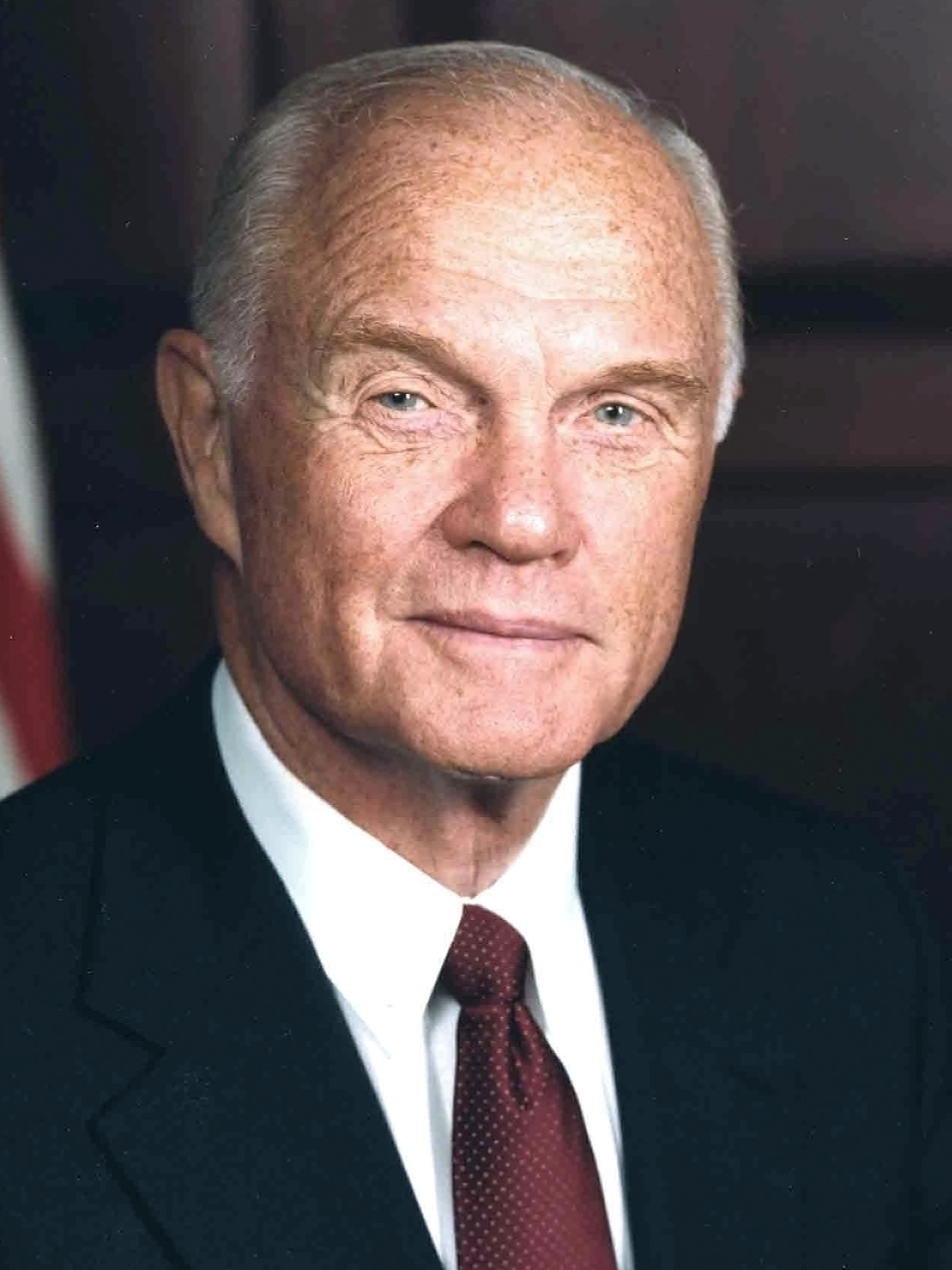

Nominee	John Glenn	Jim Betts
Party	Democratic	Republican
Popular vote	2,770,786	1,137,695
Percentage	68.80%	28.25%
- County results Glenn: 40–50% 50–60% 60–70% 70–80% 80–90% Betts: 50–60%
U.S. senator before election
John Glenn
Democratic
Elected U.S. Senator
John Glenn
Democratic

The 1980 United States Senate election in Ohio took place on November 4, 1980. Incumbent Democratic senator John Glenn was re-elected to a second term over Republican state representative Jim Betts. Despite Ronald Reagan's victory in the concurrent presidential election in Ohio, Glenn's historic margin of victory remains one of the largest in Ohio history, and it established him as a leading early contender for the 1984 Democratic presidential nomination.

== General election ==
=== Candidates ===
- Jim Betts, state representative from Cuyahoga County (Republican)
- John Glenn, incumbent U.S. senator since 1975 (Democratic)
- Rick Nagin (Independent)
- John E. Powers (Independent)

=== Results ===
1980 United States Senate election in Ohio
Party	Candidate	Votes	%
Democratic	John Glenn (incumbent)	2,770,786	68.80%
Republican	Jim Betts	1,137,695	28.25%
Independent	John E. Powers	76,412	1.90%
Independent	Rick Nagin	42,410	1.05%
Democratic hold			

== See also ==
- 1980 United States Senate elections
