= Grant Mouser =

Grant Mouser may refer to:

- Grant E. Mouser (1868–1949) U.S. Representative from Ohio
- Grant E. Mouser Jr. (1895–1943), U.S. Representative from Ohio
