= Ohio's 8th congressional district =

U.S. House district for Ohio

Coordinates: 40°0′N 84°30′W

- Interactive map of district boundaries
- Representative: Warren Davidson; R–Troy
- Distribution: 77.95% urban; 22.05% rural
- Population (2025): 809,131
- Median household income: $82,058
- Ethnicity: 74.5% White; 12.6% Black; 5.0% Hispanic; 4.3% Two or more races; 3.0% Asian; 0.7% other
- Cook PVI: R+12

Ohio's 8th congressional district sits on the west side of Ohio, bordering Indiana and Kentucky. The cities of Hamilton, Fairfield, Middletown, Eaton, and Greenville are part of the district. The district was represented by Republican John Boehner, the 53rd Speaker of the United States House of Representatives. On September 25, 2015, Boehner announced his resignation from the speakership and retirement from Congress, which became effective on October 31, 2015.

The current representative for this district is Republican Warren Davidson, who defeated Democrat Corey Foister and Green Party candidate James J. Condit Jr. in the 2016 special election to fill Boehner's seat.

== Recent election results from statewide races ==
=== 2023-2027 boundaries ===
| Year | Office | Results |
|---|---|---|
| 2008 | President | McCain 59% - 39% |
| 2012 | President | Romney 61% - 39% |
| 2016 | President | Trump 61% - 35% |
| 2016 | Senate | Portman 68% - 28% |
| 2018 | Senate | Renacci 57% - 43% |
| 2018 | Governor | DeWine 60% - 37% |
| 2018 | Secretary of State | LaRose 60% - 38% |
| 2018 | Treasurer | Sprague 63% - 37% |
| 2018 | Auditor | Faber 60% - 35% |
| 2018 | Attorney General | Yost 61% - 39% |
| 2020 | President | Trump 60% - 38% |
| 2022 | Senate | Vance 61% - 39% |
| 2022 | Governor | DeWine 69% - 31% |
| 2022 | Secretary of State | LaRose 66% - 33% |
| 2022 | Treasurer | Sprague 66% - 34% |
| 2022 | Auditor | Faber 66% - 34% |
| 2022 | Attorney General | Yost 67% - 33% |
| 2024 | President | Trump 61% - 38% |
| 2024 | Senate | Moreno 57% - 40% |

=== 2027–2033 boundaries ===
| Year | Office | Results |
|---|---|---|
| 2008 | President | McCain 58% - 41% |
| 2012 | President | Romney 60% - 40% |
| 2016 | President | Trump 58% - 38% |
| 2016 | Senate | Portman 66% - 30% |
| 2018 | Senate | Renacci 54% - 46% |
| 2018 | Governor | DeWine 57% - 40% |
| 2018 | Attorney General | Yost 58% - 42% |
| 2020 | President | Trump 57% - 42% |
| 2022 | Senate | Vance 57% - 43% |
| 2022 | Governor | DeWine 66% - 34% |
| 2022 | Secretary of State | LaRose 63% - 36% |
| 2022 | Treasurer | Sprague 63% - 37% |
| 2022 | Auditor | Faber 63% - 37% |
| 2022 | Attorney General | Yost 64% - 36% |
| 2024 | President | Trump 57% - 42% |
| 2024 | Senate | Moreno 53% - 43% |

== Composition ==
For the 118th and successive Congresses (based on redistricting following the 2020 census), the district contains all or portions of the following counties, townships, and municipalities:

Butler County (20)

All 20 townships and municipalities

Darke County (41)

All 41 townships and municipalities

Hamilton County (23)

Addyston, Cheviot, Cleves, Colerain Township, Crosby Township, Forest Park, Glendale, Greenhills, Green Township, Harrison, Harrison Township, Lincoln Heights, Lockland, Miami Township, Mount Healthy, North Bend, North College Hill, Sharonville (part; also 1st), Springdale, Springfield Township, Whitewater Township, Woodlawn, Wyoming

Miami County (9)

Concord Township (part; also 15th), Laura, Ludlow Falls, Newton Township, Pleasant Hill, Potsdam, Union, Union Township, West Milton

Preble County (23)

All 23 townships and municipalities

== List of members representing the district ==
| Member | Party | Years | Cong ress | Electoral history | Counties represented |
|---|---|---|---|---|---|
District established March 4, 1823
| William Wilson (Newark) | Democratic-Republican | March 4, 1823 – March 3, 1825 | 18th 19th 20th | Elected in 1822. Re-elected in 1824. Re-elected in 1826. Died. | |
| William Wilson (Newark) | Anti-Jacksonian | March 4, 1825 – June 6, 1827 | 18th 19th 20th | Elected in 1822. Re-elected in 1824. Re-elected in 1826. Died. | |
| Vacant | | June 6, 1827 – October 9, 1827 | 20th | | |
| William Stanbery (Newark) | Jacksonian | October 9, 1827 – March 3, 1831 | 20th 21st 22nd | Elected to finish Wilson's term. Re-elected in 1828. Re-elected in 1830. Lost renomination. | |
| William Stanbery (Newark) | Anti-Jacksonian | March 4, 1831 – March 3, 1833 | 20th 21st 22nd | Elected to finish Wilson's term. Re-elected in 1828. Re-elected in 1830. Lost renomination. | |
| Jeremiah McLene (Columbus) | Jacksonian | March 4, 1833 – March 3, 1837 | 23rd 24th | Elected in 1832. Re-elected in 1834. Lost re-election. | |
| Joseph Ridgway (Columbus) | Whig | March 4, 1837 – March 3, 1843 | 25th 26th 27th | Elected in 1836. Re-elected in 1838. Re-elected in 1840. [data missing] | |
| John I. Vanmeter (Piketon) | Whig | March 4, 1843 – March 3, 1845 | 28th | Elected in 1843. [data missing] | |
| Allen G. Thurman (Chillicothe) | Democratic | March 4, 1845 – March 3, 1847 | 29th | Elected in 1844. [data missing] | |
| John L. Taylor (Chillicothe) | Whig | March 4, 1847 – March 3, 1853 | 30th 31st 32nd | Elected in 1846. Re-elected in 1848. Re-elected in 1850. Redistricted to the 10th district. | |
| Moses Bledso Corwin (Urbana) | Whig | March 4, 1853 – March 3, 1855 | 33rd | Elected in 1852. [data missing] | |
| Benjamin Stanton (Bellefontaine) | Anti-Nebraska | March 4, 1855 – March 3, 1857 | 34th 35th 36th | Elected in 1854. Re-elected in 1856. Re-elected in 1858. [data missing] | |
| Benjamin Stanton (Bellefontaine) | Republican | March 4, 1857 – March 3, 1861 | 34th 35th 36th | Elected in 1854. Re-elected in 1856. Re-elected in 1858. [data missing] | |
| Samuel Shellabarger (Springfield) | Republican | March 4, 1861 – March 3, 1863 | 37th | Elected in 1860. [data missing] | |
| William Johnston (Mansfield) | Democratic | March 4, 1863 – March 3, 1865 | 38th | Elected in 1862. [data missing] | |
| James Randolph Hubbell (Delaware) | Republican | March 4, 1865 – March 3, 1867 | 39th | Elected in 1864. [data missing] | |
| Cornelius S. Hamilton (Marysville) | Republican | March 4, 1867 – December 22, 1867 | 40th | Elected in 1866. Died. | |
| Vacant | | December 22, 1867 – February 5, 1868 | 40th | | |
| John Beatty (Cardington) | Republican | February 5, 1868 – March 3, 1873 | 40th 41st 42nd | Elected to finish Hamilton's term. Re-elected in 1868. Re-elected in 1870. [data missing] | |
| William Lawrence (Bellefontaine) | Republican | March 4, 1873 – March 3, 1877 | 43rd 44th | Elected in 1872. Re-elected in 1874. [data missing] | |
| J. Warren Keifer (Springfield) | Republican | March 4, 1877 – March 3, 1879 | 45th | Elected in 1876. Redistricted to the 4th district. | |
| Ebenezer B. Finley (Bucyrus) | Democratic | March 4, 1879 – March 3, 1881 | 46th | Redistricted from the 14th district and re-elected in 1878. [data missing] | |
| J. Warren Keifer (Springfield) | Republican | March 4, 1881 – March 3, 1885 | 47th 48th | Redistricting from the 4th district and re-elected in 1880. Re-elected in 1882. [data missing] | |
| John Little (Xenia) | Republican | March 4, 1885 – March 3, 1887 | 49th | Elected in 1884. Redistricted to the 7th district and lost re-election. | |
| Robert P. Kennedy (Bellefontaine) | Republican | March 4, 1887 – March 3, 1891 | 50th 51st | Elected in 1886. Re-elected in 1888. [data missing] | |
| Darius D. Hare (Upper Sandusky) | Democratic | March 4, 1891 – March 3, 1893 | 52nd | Elected in 1890. Redistricted to the 13th district. | |
| Luther M. Strong (Kenton) | Republican | March 4, 1893 – March 3, 1897 | 53rd 54th | Elected in 1892. Re-elected in 1894. [data missing] | |
| Archibald Lybrand (Delaware) | Republican | March 4, 1897 – March 3, 1901 | 55th 56th | Elected in 1896. Re-elected in 1898. Lost re-election | |
| William R. Warnock (Urbana) | Republican | March 4, 1901 – March 3, 1905 | 57th 58th | Elected in 1900. Re-elected in 1902. Retired. | |
| Ralph D. Cole (Findlay) | Republican | March 4, 1905 – March 3, 1911 | 59th 60th 61st | Elected in 1904. Re-elected in 1906. Re-elected in 1908. Lost re-election. | |
| Frank B. Willis (Ada) | Republican | March 4, 1911 – January 9, 1915 | 62nd 63rd | Elected in 1910; Re-elected in 1912. Retired then resigned early when elected Governor of Ohio. | |
| Vacant | | January 9, 1915 – March 3, 1915 | 63rd | | |
| John A. Key (Marion) | Democratic | March 4, 1915 – March 3, 1919 | 64th 65th | Elected in 1914. Re-elected in 1916. Lost re-election. | |
| R. Clint Cole (Findlay) | Republican | March 4, 1919 – March 3, 1925 | 66th 67th 68th | Elected in 1918. Re-elected in 1920. Re-elected in 1922. Lost re-election. | |
| Thomas B. Fletcher (Marion) | Democratic | March 4, 1925 – March 3, 1929 | 69th 70th | Elected in 1924. Re-elected in 1926. Lost re-election. | |
| Grant E. Mouser Jr. (Marion) | Republican | March 4, 1929 – March 3, 1933 | 71st 72nd | Elected in 1928. Re-elected in 1930. Lost re-election. | |
| Thomas B. Fletcher (Marion) | Democratic | March 4, 1933 – January 3, 1939 | 73rd 74th 75th | Elected in 1932. Re-elected in 1934. Re-elected in 1936. Lost re-election. | |
| Frederick Cleveland Smith (Marion) | Republican | January 3, 1939 – January 3, 1951 | 76th 77th 78th 79th 80th 81st | Elected in 1938. Re-elected in 1940. Re-elected in 1942. Re-elected in 1944. Re-elected in 1946. Re-elected in 1948. Retired. | |
| Jackson Edward Betts (Findlay) | Republican | January 3, 1951 – January 3, 1973 | 82nd 83rd 84th 85th 86th 87th 88th 89th 90th 91st 92nd | Elected in 1950. Re-elected in 1952. Re-elected in 1954. Re-elected in 1956. Re-elected in 1958. Re-elected in 1960. Re-elected in 1962. Re-elected in 1964. Re-elected in 1966. Re-elected in 1968. Re-elected in 1970. Retired. | |
| Walter E. Powell (Fairfield) | Republican | January 3, 1973 – January 3, 1975 | 93rd | Redistricted from the 24th district and re-elected in 1972. Retired. | |
| Tom Kindness (Hamilton) | Republican | January 3, 1975 – January 3, 1987 | 94th 95th 96th 97th 98th 99th | Elected in 1974. Re-elected in 1976. Re-elected in 1978. Re-elected in 1980. Re-elected in 1982. Re-elected in 1984. Retired to run for U.S. Senator. | |
| Buz Lukens (Middletown) | Republican | January 3, 1987 – October 24, 1990 | 100th 101st | Elected in 1986. Re-elected in 1988. Lost renomination and resigned. | |
| Vacant | | October 24, 1990 – January 3, 1991 | 101st | | |
| John Boehner (West Chester) | Republican | January 3, 1991 – October 31, 2015 | 102nd 103rd 104th 105th 106th 107th 108th 109th 110th 111th 112th 113th 114th | Elected in 1990. Re-elected in 1992. Re-elected in 1994. Re-elected in 1996. Re-elected in 1998. Re-elected in 2000. Re-elected in 2002. Re-elected in 2004. Re-elected in 2006. Re-elected in 2008. Re-elected in 2010. Re-elected in 2012. Re-elected in 2014. Resigned. | |
| John Boehner (West Chester) | Republican | January 3, 1991 – October 31, 2015 | 102nd 103rd 104th 105th 106th 107th 108th 109th 110th 111th 112th 113th 114th | Elected in 1990. Re-elected in 1992. Re-elected in 1994. Re-elected in 1996. Re-elected in 1998. Re-elected in 2000. Re-elected in 2002. Re-elected in 2004. Re-elected in 2006. Re-elected in 2008. Re-elected in 2010. Re-elected in 2012. Re-elected in 2014. Resigned. | 2003–2013 |
| John Boehner (West Chester) | Republican | January 3, 1991 – October 31, 2015 | 102nd 103rd 104th 105th 106th 107th 108th 109th 110th 111th 112th 113th 114th | Elected in 1990. Re-elected in 1992. Re-elected in 1994. Re-elected in 1996. Re-elected in 1998. Re-elected in 2000. Re-elected in 2002. Re-elected in 2004. Re-elected in 2006. Re-elected in 2008. Re-elected in 2010. Re-elected in 2012. Re-elected in 2014. Resigned. | 2013–2023 |
| Vacant | | October 31, 2015 – June 7, 2016 | 114th | | 2013–2023 |
| Warren Davidson (Troy) | Republican | June 7, 2016 – present | 114th 115th 116th 117th 118th 119th | Elected to finish Boehner's term. Re-elected in 2016. Re-elected in 2018. Re-elected in 2020. Re-elected in 2022. Re-elected in 2024. Re-elected in 2026. | 2013–2023 |
| Warren Davidson (Troy) | Republican | June 7, 2016 – present | 114th 115th 116th 117th 118th 119th | Elected to finish Boehner's term. Re-elected in 2016. Re-elected in 2018. Re-elected in 2020. Re-elected in 2022. Re-elected in 2024. Re-elected in 2026. | 2023–2027 |

== Recent election results ==
| Year | Democratic | Republican | Other |
|---|---|---|---|
| 1920 | Fred H. Guthery: 36,665 | √ Clint Cole (incumbent): 43,473 | |
| 1922 | H. H. Hartmann: 34,105 | √ Clint Cole (incumbent): 37,065 | |
| 1924 | √ Thomas B. Fletcher: 38,439 | Clint Cole (incumbent): 33,258 | Charles E. Lukens: 555 |
| 1926 | √ Thomas B. Fletcher (incumbent): 30,167 | James R. Hopley: 23,247 | |
| 1928 | Thomas B. Fletcher (incumbent): 38,651 | √ Grant E. Mouser Jr.: 42,199 | |
| 1930 | Carl W. Smith: 33,906 | √ Grant E. Mouser Jr. (incumbent): 35,663 | |
| 1932 | √ Thomas B. Fletcher: 45,930 | Grant E. Mouser Jr.: 41,234 | |
| 1934 | √ Thomas B. Fletcher (incumbent): 39,466 | Gertrude Jones: 36,112 | |
| 1936 | √ Thomas B. Fletcher (incumbent): 49,668 | Grant E. Mouser Jr.: 42,565 | |
| 1938 | Thomas B. Fletcher (incumbent): 33,972 | √ Frederick C. Smith: 40,772 | |
| 1940 | Kenneth M. Petri: 44,605 | √ Frederick C. Smith (incumbent): 49,218 | |
| 1942 | Thomas B. Fletcher: 22,753 | √ Frederick C. Smith (incumbent): 33,797 | |
| 1944 | Roy Warren Roof: 34,494 | √ Frederick C. Smith (incumbent): 51,253 | |
| 1946 | John T. Siemon: 22,945 | √ Frederick C. Smith (incumbent): 40,755 | |
| 1948 | Andrew T. Durbin: 36,685 | √ Frederick C. Smith (incumbent): 43,929 | |
| 1950 | W. Dexter Hazen: 28,379 | √ Jackson E. Betts: 47,761 | |
| 1952 | Henry P. Drake: 34,474 | √ Jackson E. Betts (incumbent): 75,768 | |
| 1954 | Thomas M. Dowd: 30,592 | √ Jackson E. Betts (incumbent): 52,196 | |
| 1956 | Robert M. Corry: 40,716 | √ Jackson E. Betts (incumbent): 70,690 | |
| 1958 | Virgil M. Gase: 39,343 | √ Jackson E. Betts (incumbent): 62,232 | |
| 1960 | Virgil M. Gase: 38,871 | √ Jackson E. Betts (incumbent): 81,373 | |
| 1962 | Morris Laderman: 28,400 | √ Jackson E. Betts (incumbent): 66,458 | |
| 1964 | Frank B. Bennett: 45,445 | √ Jackson E. Betts (incumbent): 73,395 | |
| 1966 | Frank B. Bennett: 38,787 | √ Jackson E. Betts (incumbent): 78,933 | |
| 1968 | Marie Baker: 40,898 | √ Jackson E. Betts (incumbent): 101,974 | |
| 1970 | | √ Jackson E. Betts (incumbent): 90,916 | |
| 1972 | James D. Ruppert: 73,344 | √ Walter E. Powell*: 80,050 | |
| 1974 | T. Edward Strinko: 45,701 | √ Tom Kindness: 51,097 | Don Gingerich: 23,616 |
| 1976 | John W. Griffin: 46,424 | √ Tom Kindness (incumbent): 110,775 | Joseph F. Payton: 4,158 |
| 1978 | Luella R. Schroeder: 32,493 | √ Tom Kindness (incumbent): 81,156 | George Hahn: 3 |
| 1980 | John W. Griffin: 44,162 | √ Tom Kindness (incumbent): 139,590 | |
| 1982 | John W. Griffin: 49,877 | √ Tom Kindness (incumbent): 98,527 | |
| 1984 | John T. Francis: 46,673 | √ Tom Kindness (incumbent): 155,200 | |
| 1986 | John W. Griffin: 46,195 | √ Buz Lukens: 98,475 | |
| 1988 | John W. Griffin: 49,084 | √ Buz Lukens (incumbent): 154,164 | |
| 1990 | Gregory V. Jolivette: 63,584 | √ John Boehner*: 99,955 | |
| 1992 | Fred Sennet: 62,033 | √ John Boehner (incumbent): 176,362 | |
| 1994 | | √ John Boehner (incumbent): 148,338 | |
| 1996 | Jeffrey D. Kitchen: 61,515 | √ John Boehner (incumbent): 165,815 | William Baker (N): 8,613 |
| 1998 | John W. Griffin: 52,912 | √ John Boehner (incumbent): 127,979 | |
| 2000 | John G. Parks: 66,293 | √ John Boehner (incumbent): 179,756 | David R. Shock (L): 3,802 |
| 2002 | Jeff Hardenbrook: 49,444 | √ John Boehner (incumbent): 119,947 | |
| 2004 | Jeff Hardenbrook: 87,769 | √ John Boehner (incumbent): 195,923 | |
| 2006 | Mort Meier: 74,641 | √ John Boehner (incumbent): 132,743 | |
| 2008 | Nicholas von Stein: 74,848 | √ John Boehner (incumbent): 163,586 | |
| 2010 | Justin Coussoule: 65,883 | √ John Boehner (incumbent): 142,731 | David Harlow (L): 5,121; James Condit (C): 3,701 |
| 2012 | | √ John Boehner (incumbent): 246,380 | James Condit (C) : 1,938 |
| 2014 | Tom Poetter: 51,534 | √ John Boehner (incumbent): 126,539 | James Condit (C): 10,257 |
| 2016 (special) | Corey Foister: 5,937 | √ Warren Davidson: 21,618 | James Condit (G): 607 |
| 2016 | Steve Fought: 87,794 | √ Warren Davidson (incumbent): 223,833 | Derrick Hendricks (G): 13,879 |
| 2018 | Vanessa Enoch: 89,451 | √ Warren Davidson (incumbent): 177,892 | |
| 2020 | Vanessa Enoch: 110,766 | √ Warren Davidson (incumbent): 246,277 | Isaac Reed (I) (WI): 114 |
| 2022 | Vanessa Enoch: 98,629 | √ Warren Davidson (incumbent): 180,287 | |
| 2024 | Vanessa Enoch: 137,284 | √ Warren Davidson (incumbent): 237,503 | |
| 2026 | Vanessa Enoch: 154,828 | √Warren Davidson (incumbent): 168,689 | |

== See also ==
- Ohio's congressional districts
- List of United States congressional districts

U.S. House of Representatives
| Preceded by Pennsylvania's 3rd congressional district | Home district of the speaker December 5, 1881 – March 4, 1883 | Succeeded by Kentucky's 6th congressional district |
| Preceded by California's 8th congressional district | Home district of the speaker January 5, 2011 – October 29, 2015 | Succeeded by Wisconsin's 1st congressional district |
