= Mouser =

Mouser may refer to:

- A working cat used for hunting rodents
- A ratter, a dog used to catch mice and rats
- Chief Mouser to the Cabinet Office, the official resident cat of the Prime Minister of the United Kingdom
- Mouser (video game), a 1981 video game
- Mouser Electronics, an online distributor of electronic components
- A fictional type of rat catching robots from the Teenage Mutant Ninja Turtles series
- A boss in the video game Super Mario Bros. 2 and recurring villain for cartoon segments of The Super Mario Bros. Super Show!
- A homemade grenade used by the fictional character Powder in the television series Arcane

== People ==
- Grant Mouser (disambiguation), list of people with the name
- Mary Mouser (born 1996), American actress
- Michelle Mouser (born 1973), American beauty queen

== Places ==
=== United States ===
- Mouser, Oklahoma

== Other ==
- Munich Mouser

== See also ==
- Fafhrd and the Gray Mouser
- Mauser
