= 1978 Ohio State Auditor election =

- November 7, 1978

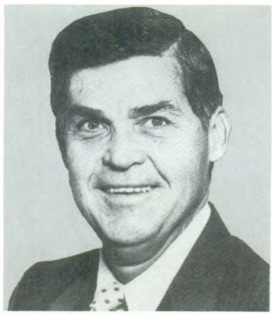
Nominee	Thomas E. Ferguson	Buz Lukens
Party	Democratic	Republican
Popular vote	1,455,219	1,177,329
Percentage	55.28%	44.72%
- County results Ferguson: 50–60% 60–70% 70–80% Lukens: 50–60% 60–70%
State Auditor before election
Thomas E. Ferguson
Democratic
Elected State Auditor
Thomas E. Ferguson
Democratic

The 1978 Ohio State Auditor election was held on November 7, 1978, to elect the Ohio State Auditor. Primaries were held on June 6, 1978. Democratic incumbent Ohio State Auditor Thomas E. Ferguson won re-election to a second term, defeating Republican Ohio State Senator Buz Lukens by ten percentage points.

== Democratic primary ==
=== Candidates ===
- Thomas E. Ferguson, incumbent Ohio State Auditor (1975–1995)

=== Campaign ===
Ferguson won renomination unopposed.

=== Results ===
Democratic primary results
Party	Candidate	Votes	%
Democratic	Thomas E. Ferguson	477,610	100.00%
Total votes		477,610	100.00%

== Republican primary ==
=== Candidates ===
- Buz Lukens, Ohio State Senator (1971–1987)

=== Campaign ===
Lukens won the Republican nomination without opposition.

=== Results ===
Republican primary results
Party	Candidate	Votes	%
Republican	Buz Lukens	437,075	100.00%
Total votes		437,075	100.00%

== General election ==
=== Candidates ===
- Thomas E. Ferguson, incumbent Ohio State Auditor (1975–1995) (Democratic)
- Buz Lukens, Ohio State Senator (1971–1987) (Republican)

=== Results ===
1978 Ohio State Auditor election results
Party	Candidate	Votes	%	±%
Democratic	Thomas E. Ferguson	1,455,219	55.28%	−0.41
Republican	Buz Lukens	1,177,329	44.72%	+0.41
Total votes		2,632,548	100.00%	
Democratic hold				
