= Thomas B. Fletcher =

American politician

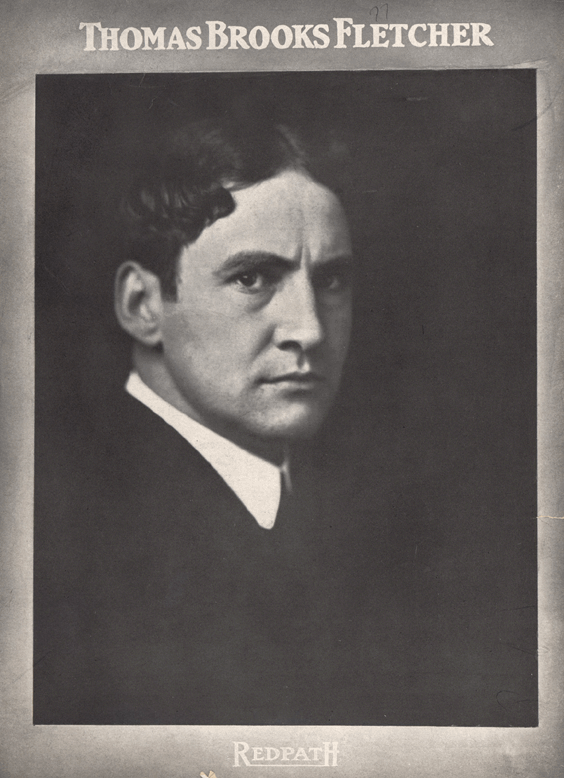
- c. 1910

Member of the U.S. House of Representatives from Ohio's 8th district
- In office March 4, 1933 – January 3, 1939
- Preceded by: Grant E. Mouser Jr.
- Succeeded by: Frederick Cleveland Smith
- In office March 4, 1925 – March 3, 1929
- Preceded by: R. Clint Cole
- Succeeded by: Grant E. Mouser Jr.

Personal details
- Born: Thomas Brooks Fletcher; October 10, 1879 Mechanicstown, Ohio, US
- Died: July 1, 1945 (aged 65) Washington, D. C., US
- Resting place: Mechanicstown Cemetery; 40°36′59″N 80°57′24″W
- Party: Democratic
- Education: Mount Union College

Thomas Brooks Fletcher (October 10, 1879 – July 1, 1945) was an American newspaperman and politician who served five terms as a U.S. representative from Ohio between 1925 and 1939.

== Biography ==
Born in Mechanicstown, Ohio, Fletcher attended the public schools, a private school at Augusta, Ohio, and the Richard School of Dramatic Art in Cleveland. He graduated from Mount Union College, Alliance, Ohio, in 1900.

=== Newspaper career ===
He was editor of the Daily Leader, Alliance, Ohio, from 1903 to 1905. He served on the staff of the Morning News, Canton, Ohio, from 1905 to 1906. He became a Redpath lecturer in 1906. He was editor and publisher of the Daily Tribune at Marion, Ohio, from 1910 to 1922.

=== Congress ===
Fletcher was elected as a Democrat to the Sixty-ninth and Seventieth Congresses (March 4, 1925 – March 3, 1929). He was an unsuccessful candidate for reelection in 1928 to the Seventy-first Congress.

Fletcher was elected to the Seventy-third, Seventy-fourth, and Seventy-fifth Congresses (March 4, 1933 – January 3, 1939). He served as chairman of the Committee on Election of President, Vice President, and Representatives (Seventy-fourth and Seventy-fifth Congresses), Committee on the Census (Seventy-fifth Congress). He was an unsuccessful candidate for reelection in 1938 to the Seventy-sixth Congress and for election in 1942 to the Seventy-eighth Congress.

=== Later career and death ===
He resumed lecturing and chautauqua work.

He died in Washington, D.C., July 1, 1945. He was interred in Mechanicstown Cemetery, Mechanicstown, Ohio.

== Electoral history ==
Year	Democratic	Republican	Other
1924	√ Thomas B. Fletcher: 38,439	Clint Cole (incumbent): 33,258	Charles E. Lukens: 555
1926	√ Thomas B. Fletcher (incumbent): 30,167	James R. Hopley: 23,247	
1928	Thomas B. Fletcher (incumbent): 38,651	√ Grant E. Mouser Jr.: 42,199	
1932	√ Thomas B. Fletcher: 45,930	Grant E. Mouser Jr.: 41,234	
1934	√ Thomas B. Fletcher (incumbent): 39,466	Gertrude Jones: 36,112	
1936	√ Thomas B. Fletcher (incumbent): 49,668	Grant E. Mouser Jr.: 42,565	
1938	Thomas B. Fletcher (incumbent): 33,972	√ Frederick C. Smith: 40,772	

== Sources ==
- United States Congress. "Thomas B. Fletcher (id: F000205)". Biographical Directory of the United States Congress.

U.S. House of Representatives
Preceded by R. Clint Cole	Member of the U.S. House of Representatives from Ohio's 8th congressional district 1925–1929	Succeeded by Grant E. Mouser Jr.
Preceded by Grant E. Mouser Jr.	Member of the U.S. House of Representatives from Ohio's 8th congressional district 1933–1939	Succeeded by Frederick C. Smith
