= Tom Kindness =

American politician

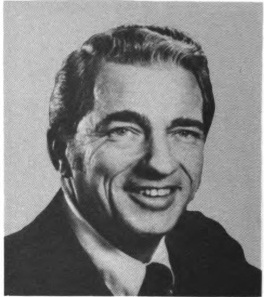

Member of the U.S. House of Representatives from Ohio's 8th district
- In office January 3, 1975 – January 3, 1987
- Preceded by: Walter E. Powell
- Succeeded by: Buz Lukens

Member of the Ohio House of Representatives from the 58th district
- In office January 3, 1971 – December 31, 1974
- Preceded by: Thomas Rentschler
- Succeeded by: Michael A. Fox

Personal details
- Born: Thomas Norman Kindness; August 26, 1929 Knoxville, Tennessee, U.S.
- Died: January 8, 2004 (aged 74) Exeter, Devonshire, England
- Party: Republican
- Education: University of Maryland (BA); George Washington University (LLB)

Thomas Norman Kindness (August 26, 1929 – January 8, 2004) was an American politician who served six terms as a member of the United States House of Representatives representing Ohio from January 3, 1975, to January 3, 1987.

== Life ==
Born in Knoxville, Tennessee, Kindness graduated from Glendale High School in Glendale, California, in 1947. Kindness received his bachelor of arts degree from the University of Maryland in 1951 and his bachelor of laws degree from George Washington University in 1953. While a student at Maryland, Kindness became a member of the Alpha Tau Omega fraternity.

=== Career ===
He was assistant counsel for paper company Champion International, in Hamilton, Ohio, from 1957 to 1973, and was elected to the city council of Hamilton in 1964, serving until 1969. He served as mayor of Hamilton from 1964 to 1967. He served in the Ohio House of Representatives from 1971 to 1974, when he was elected to Congress from Ohio's eighth congressional district, defeating Democrat T. Edward Strinko.

Kindness was re-elected five times: defeating Democrats John W. Griffin in 1976, Luella R. Schroeder in 1978, John W. Griffin again in 1980 and 1982, and John T. Francis in 1984.

In 1986, Kindness was one of the House impeachment managers who prosecuted the case in the impeachment trial of Judge Harry E. Claiborne. Claiborne was found guilty by the United States Senate and removed from his federal judgeship.

In 1986, Kindness won the Republican nomination for the U.S. Senate, but he lost to incumbent John Glenn.

=== Later career ===
After this loss, Kindness stayed in Washington, D.C., and worked as a lobbyist. When Donald "Buz" Lukens, who had replaced Kindness as the 8th district's representative, was caught in a sex scandal in 1989, Kindness attempted to win his old seat, opposing Lukens in the 1990 Republican primary.

He entered a Republican primary battle that included Lukens, state Representative John Boehner (who would later be elected to the seat and become House Speaker during his tenure in Congress) and lesser-known candidates.

Early polls gave Kindness a 60-point lead over the relatively obscure Boehner. But Boehner attacked Kindness's ethics, citing Kindness's votes for congressional pay raises and against limits on fees for speeches by congressmen. Boehner also depicted Kindness as a carpetbagger who had abandoned his district for Washington. Despite Kindness's outspending him 5–1, Boehner won the nomination with 49 percent of the vote. Kindness finished with 32 percent and Lukens with 17 percent.

== Death ==
Kindness died in Exeter, Devonshire, England at the age of 74.

== See also ==
- List of United States representatives from Ohio
- List of mayors of Hamilton, Ohio

Party political offices
Preceded by Jim Betts	Republican nominee for U.S. Senator from Ohio (Class 3); 1986	Succeeded by Mike DeWine
U.S. House of Representatives
Preceded by Walter E. Powell	Member of the U.S. House of Representatives from Ohio's 8th congressional district 1975–1987	Succeeded by Buz Lukens
