= Ralph D. Cole =

American lawyer and politician

Ralph Dayton Cole
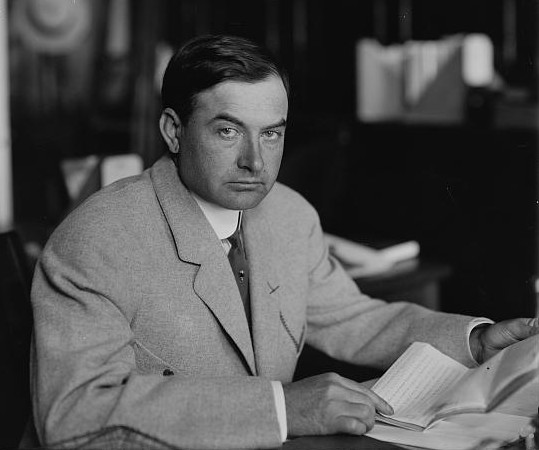
- Cole in 1920

Member of the U.S. House of Representatives from Ohio's 8th district
- In office March 4, 1905 – March 3, 1911
- Preceded by: William R. Warnock
- Succeeded by: Frank B. Willis

Member of the Ohio House of Representatives from the Hancock County district
- In office January 1, 1900 – January 3, 1904
- Preceded by: Oliver P. Shaw
- Succeeded by: M. M. Carrothers

Personal details
- Born: November 30, 1873 Vanlue, Ohio, U.S.
- Died: October 15, 1932 (aged 58) Warren, Ohio, U.S.
- Resting place: Maple Grove Cemetery, Findlay, Ohio, U.S.
- Party: Republican
- Spouse: Blanche Davis (m. 1907)
- Children: 1
- Education: University of Findlay; Ohio Northern University
- Profession: Attorney

Military service
- Service: United States Army
- Years of service: 1917–1919
- Rank: Lieutenant Colonel
- Unit: 37th Division
- Commands: 112th Military Police Battalion
- Wars: World War I

Ralph Davis Cole (November 30, 1873 – October 15, 1932) was an American lawyer and politician from Ohio. A Republican, he served three terms as a U.S. representative, March 4, 1905 to March 3, 1911. He was the brother of Raymond Clinton Cole, who also served in Congress.

A native of Vanlue, Ohio, Cole was raised and educated in Findlay, graduated from Findlay College in 1896, then attended Ada College (now Ohio Northern University). He worked as deputy clerk of Hancock County, Ohio while studying law, and he was admitted to the bar in 1900 and practiced in Findlay.

In addition to practicing law, Cole was active in politics as a Republican and served in the Ohio House of Representatives from 1900 to 1904. In 1904 he won election to the United House of Representatives; he was reelected in 1906 and 1908 and served from March 4, 1905 to March 3, 1911. After leaving Congress, Cole was a delegate to several national Republican conventions and ran unsuccessfully for the U.S. Senate and governor of Ohio. During World War I, Cole served in combat with the 37th Division and attained the rank of lieutenant colonel.

In October 1932, Cole was severely injured in an automobile; his injuries proved fatal and he died in Warren, Ohio on October 15, 1932. He was buried at Maple Grove Cemetery in Findlay.

== Early life ==
Ralph D. Cole was born in Vanlue, Ohio on November 30, 1873, a son of John W. Cole and Sarah McRea (or McCree) Cole. He attended the public schools of Findlay, then began attendance at Findlay College, from which he graduated with a Bachelor of Philosophy degree in 1896. After graduating, Cole continued his studies at Ada College (now Ohio Northern University).

From 1897 to 1899, Cole served as the deputy clerk of Hancock County, Ohio. While working in the clerk's office, he studied law in preparation for a career as an attorney. Cole was admitted to the bar in 1900 and commenced practice in Findlay.

== Political career ==
A Republican, Cole served as member of the Ohio House of Representatives from 1900 to 1904. In 1904, he was elected to the 59th United States Congress. He won reelection to the 60th and 61st Congresses, and served from March 4, 1905 to March 3, 1911. He was an unsuccessful candidate for renomination in 1910.

After leaving Congress, Cole returned to Ohio, where he resumed the practice of law in Findlay, Toledo, and Columbus. From 1912 to 1913, he was a legal advisor to the U.S. Comptroller of the Currency. While practicing law, Cole maintained his interest in Republican politics, including an unsuccessful candidacy for the Republican nomination in the 1914 United States Senate election in Ohio. In 1916, he served as chairman of the speakers' bureau for the Republican National Committee. He was also a delegate to the Republican National Conventions in 1916, 1924, and 1928. Cole was an unsuccessful candidate for the Republican nomination in the 1920 Ohio gubernatorial election.

== Military career ==
Cole enlisted in the United States Army on June 6, 1917. He served during combat in France as commander of the 112th Military Police Battalion, a unit of the 37th Division. He later as the division's assistant adjutant, and he attained the rank of lieutenant colonel.

Following the termination of hostilities, Cole became one of the founders of the American Legion at Paris on February 15, 1919. He was honorably discharged from the service April 6, 1919.

== Death and legacy ==
Cole sustained serious injuries in an automobile accident near Parkman, Ohio. They proved fatal and he died in Warren, Ohio, on October 15, 1932. Cole was interred at Maple Grove Cemetery in Findlay.

=== Honors ===
Cole received the honorary degree of LL.D. from Ohio University in 1915, and from Marietta College and Ohio Northern University, both in 1919. American Legion Post 3 in Findlay is named in Cole's honor.

== Family ==
In 1907, Cole married Blanche Davis of Findlay. They were the parents of a son, Ralph D. Cole Jr.

U.S. House of Representatives
Preceded by William R. Warnock	Member of the U.S. House of Representatives from Ohio's 8th congressional district 1905-1911	Succeeded by Frank B. Willis
