= Frederick Cleveland Smith =

American politician

Frederick C. Smith
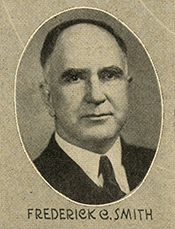

Member of the U.S. House of Representatives from Ohio's 8th district
- In office January 3, 1939 – January 3, 1951
- Preceded by: Thomas B. Fletcher
- Succeeded by: Jackson Edward Betts

Personal details
- Born: Frederick Cleveland Smith; July 29, 1884 Shanesville, Ohio, US
- Died: July 16, 1956 (aged 71) Marion, Ohio, US
- Resting place: Marion Cemetery
- Party: Republican
- Education: A.T. Still University
- Occupation: Osteopathic physician

Frederick Cleveland Smith (July 29, 1884 – July 16, 1956) was an American physician and politician who served six terms as a Republican member of the U.S. House of Representatives from Ohio from 1939 to 1951.

== Early life and career ==
Frederick C. Smith was born in Shanesville, Ohio. He pursued higher education in osteopathic medicine in Kirksville, Missouri, and practiced there for several years. He then traveled overseas to continue his study of medicine in Frankfurt, Germany, and in Vienna, Austria.

In 1917, Smith was licensed to practice medicine and surgery in the State of Ohio and opened his practice in Marion, Ohio. He also served as mayor in Marion, Ohio from January 1936 until January 1, 1939, when he resigned.

Smith founded the Frederick C. Smith Clinic in Marion, which brought together doctors in various fields in a practice that benefited from each doctor's specialty. The original clinic was located on East Church Street. The concern continues in Marion, Ohio, and still bears Smith's name.

== Tenure in Congress ==
Smith was elected as a Republican to the Seventy-sixth and to the five succeeding Congresses. He supported $7 billion in aid to Britain, Lend-Lease, and the 1941 amendment to the Neutrality Act to remove restrictions that forbade U.S. vessels from entering combat zones and US citizens from sailing on vessels of belligerents.

He also denounced "isolationism" and took a staunchly "pro-British" position in between the "fall of France" in the summer of 1940 and the Nazi invasion of the Soviet Union in the summer of 1941, during which time Great Britain was essentially alone. He frequently spoke in favor of aiding Britain.

During the early 1950s, Smith "would invariably draw 'zero' ratings from the Americans for Democratic Action and other leftist groups." One of the most conservative members of Congress between 1937 and 1970, he has been labeled by some writers as the sixth most conservative overall since 1937.

He was not a candidate for renomination in 1950.

== Later years, death and interment ==
Smith resumed his medical profession. He died in Marion, Ohio, on July 16, 1956, and was interred in the Marion Cemetery.

== Sources ==
- United States Congress. "Frederick Cleveland Smith (id: S000536)". Biographical Directory of the United States Congress.
- The Political Graveyard

U.S. House of Representatives
Preceded by Thomas B. Fletcher	Member of the U.S. House of Representatives from Ohio's 8th congressional district 1939 - 1951	Succeeded by Jackson E. Betts
