= Ohio's 24th congressional district =

Defunct U.S. Congress electoral division

Coordinates: 39°25′N 84°17′W

- Obsolete district
- Created: 1967
- Eliminated: 1970
- Years active: 1967-1973

The 24th congressional district of Ohio was created for the 1966 election, after the banning of at-large seats by the Voting Rights Act of 1965. It replaced Ohio's at-large congressional district. It was eliminated in the redistricting following the 1970 census. At the time of its creation, it consisted of the southwestern counties of Preble, Butler, Warren and parts of southern and eastern Montgomery.

== List of members representing the district ==
Member	Party	Year(s)	Cong ress	Electoral history
District established January 3, 1967
Buz Lukens (Middletown)	Republican	January 3, 1967 – January 3, 1971	90th 91st	Elected in 1966. Re-elected in 1968. Retired to run for Governor of Ohio.
Walter E. Powell (Fairfield)	Republican	January 3, 1971 – January 3, 1973	92nd	Elected in 1970. Redistricted to the 8th district.
District dissolved January 3, 1973

== Election results ==
The following chart shows historic election results. Bold name indicates victor. Italic name indicates incumbent.

Year	Democratic	Republican	Other
1966	James H. Pelley: 43,418	Donald E. "Buz" Lukens: 61,194	
1968	Lloyd D. Miller: 44,400	**Donald E. "Buz" Lukens**: 105,350	
1970	James D. Ruppert: 55,455	**Walter E. Powell***: 63,344	Joseph F. Payton (AI): 4,179
