= Archibald Lybrand =

American politician

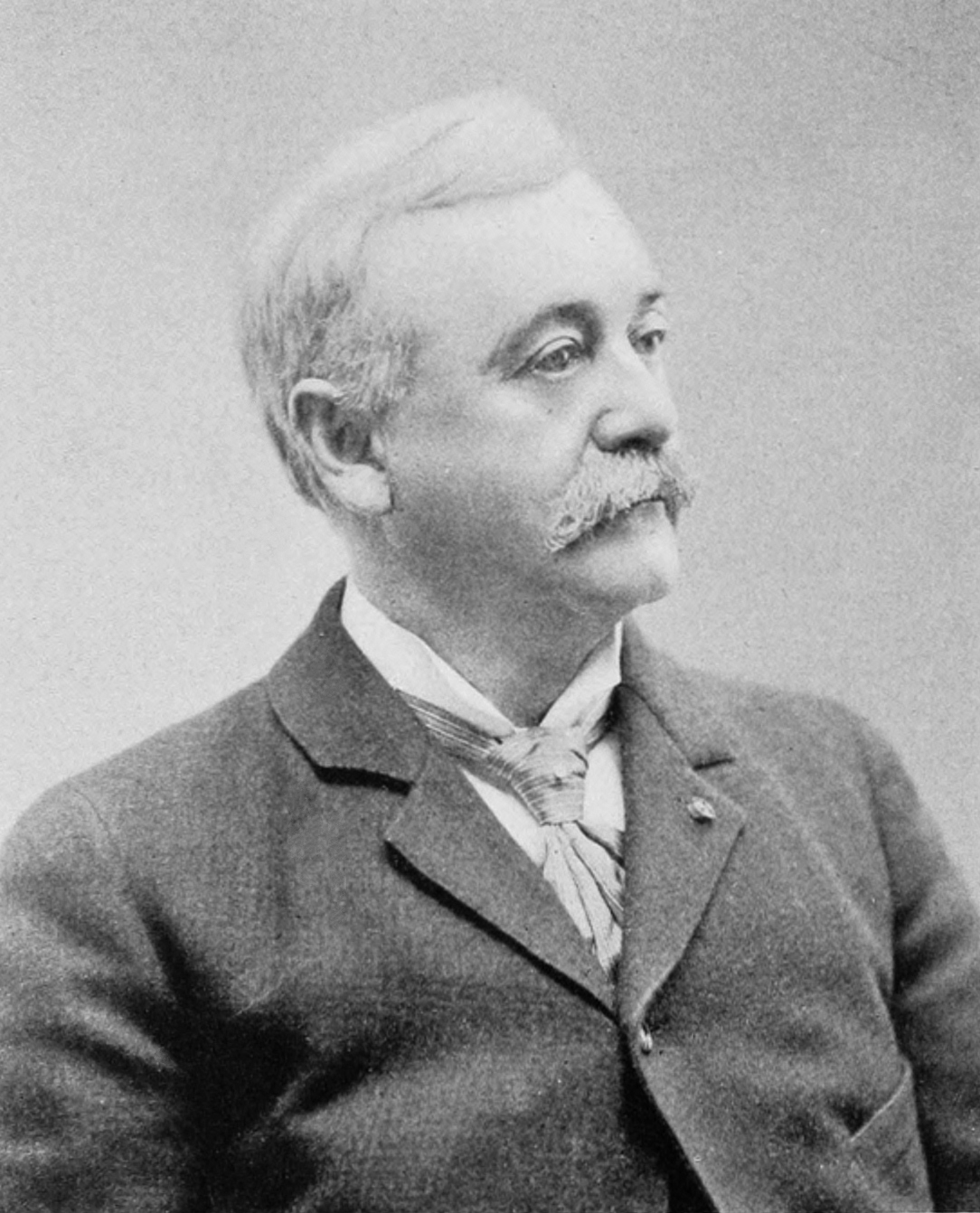

Member of the U.S. House of Representatives from Ohio's 8th district
- In office March 4, 1897 – March 4, 1901
- Preceded by: Luther M. Strong
- Succeeded by: William R. Warnock

Personal details
- Born: May 23, 1840 Tarlton, Ohio, U.S.
- Died: February 7, 1910 (aged 69) Daytona, Florida, U.S.
- Resting place: Oak Grove Cemetery, Delaware, Ohio
- Party: Republican
- Education: Ohio Wesleyan University

Archibald Lybrand (May 23, 1840 – February 7, 1910) was a lawyer, soldier, businessman, and a U.S. representative from Ohio for two terms from 1897 to 1901.

== Biography ==
Born in Tarlton, Ohio, Lybrand moved to Delaware, Ohio, in 1857. He attended the common schools and the Ohio Wesleyan University at Delaware.

During the Civil War, he enlisted in the Union Army on April 26, 1861, and served in Company I, Fourth Regiment, Ohio Volunteer Infantry. He later transferred to Company E, Seventy-third Regiment, Ohio Volunteer Infantry, and was promoted to first lieutenant. He was later commissioned as the company's captain. He remained in the service three years.

After mustering out, he returned to Delaware, Ohio, where he served as mayor in 1869. He studied law and was admitted to the bar in 1871. He was a landowner and also engaged in agricultural and mercantile pursuits. He served as the postmaster of Delaware from 1881–85.

=== Congress ===
Lybrand was elected as a Republican to the Fifty-fifth and Fifty-sixth Congresses (March 4, 1897 – March 3, 1901). He was an unsuccessful candidate for renomination in 1900 and resumed his business activities in Delaware, Ohio.

=== Death ===
He died in Daytona, Florida, February 7, 1910, and was interred in Oak Grove Cemetery, Delaware, Ohio.

== Notes ==
U.S. House of Representatives
Preceded by Luther M. Strong	Member of the U.S. House of Representatives from Ohio's 8th congressional district 1897-1901	Succeeded by William R. Warnock
