= Walter E. Powell =

American politician (1931–2020)

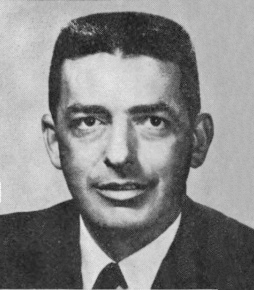

Member of the U.S. House of Representatives from Ohio
- In office January 3, 1971 – January 3, 1975
- Preceded by: Buz Lukens
- Succeeded by: Tom Kindness
- Constituency: 24th district (1971–1973); 8th district (1973–1975)

Member of the Ohio Senate from the 4th district
- In office January 3, 1967 – January 3, 1971
- Preceded by: Inaugural holder
- Succeeded by: Buz Lukens

Personal details
- Born: April 25, 1931 Hamilton, Ohio, U.S.
- Died: January 17, 2020 (aged 88) Hamilton, Ohio, U.S.
- Party: Republican
- Spouse: Bobbi Mae (m. 1952, died)
- Children: 2
- Education: Miami University; Heidelberg University (Ohio); University of Cincinnati
- Occupation: Educator, lawyer

Walter Eugene Powell (April 25, 1931 – January 17, 2020) was an American educator and politician of the Republican party who served two terms as a U.S. representative from Ohio from 1971 to 1975.

== Life and career ==
Powell was born in Hamilton, Ohio, the son of Anna and Walter Powell. Before entering politics, Powell was a history teacher.

He met his wife, Bobbi Mae, in the summer of 1951, as summer employees of LeSourdsville Lake. They married June 2, 1952.

=== Early political career ===
He began his career as the city clerk of Fairfield, Ohio in 1956, and became a member of Fairfield City Council in 1958. In 1960, Powell successfully ran for the Ohio House of Representatives. He was reelected in 1962, and 1964.

The Voting Rights Act of 1965 provided Powell with incentive to run for the Ohio Senate, which he did. He ended up winning, and took a seat in the upper chamber on January 3, 1967. While he was up for reelection to the Senate in 1970, he instead initially opted to run for Ohio State Treasurer. However, he eventually entered the race for a seat in the United States House of Representatives.

=== Congress ===
He went on to win the seat, and ultimately swapped seats with his predecessor, Buz Lukens, who then was appointed to Powell's senate seat.

Powell went on to serve two terms in Congress, and opted to retire after his second term ended in 1975. He was succeeded by Tom Kindness.

== Retirement ==
Following his tenure in Congress, he retired to Middletown, Ohio. He became a high school administrator, rising to the level of principal. He later changed careers, attending University of Cincinnati Law School and passing the bar exam at age 53. He worked for many years thereafter as a real estate, tax, and probate lawyer.

=== Death ===
Powell died on January 17, 2020.

== See also ==
- List of United States representatives from Ohio

U.S. House of Representatives
Preceded by Buz Lukens	Member of the U.S. House of Representatives from Ohio's 24th congressional district 1971–1973	Succeeded by District eliminated
Preceded by Jackson Edward Betts	Member of the U.S. House of Representatives from Ohio's 8th congressional district 1973–1975	Succeeded by Tom Kindness
