= John A. Key =

American politician

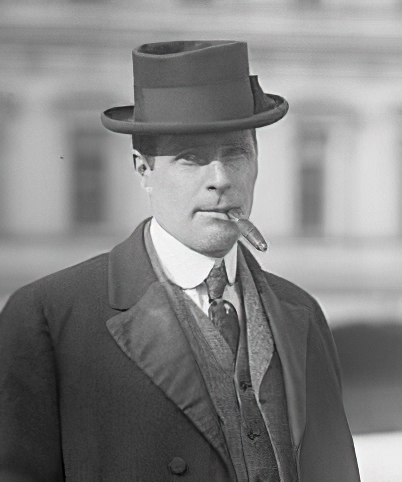
- Key in Washington, D.C. (1914)

Member of the U.S. House of Representatives from Ohio
- In office March 4, 1913 – March 3, 1919
- Preceded by: Carl C. Anderson
- Succeeded by: R. Clint Cole
- Constituency: 13th district (1913–1915); 8th district (1915–1919)

Personal details
- Born: John Alexander Key; December 30, 1871 Marion, Ohio, U.S.
- Died: March 4, 1954 (aged 82) Marion, Ohio, U.S.
- Resting place: Marion Cemetery
- Party: Democratic

John Alexander Key (December 30, 1871 – March 4, 1954) was an American politician who served as a U.S. representative from Ohio for three terms from 1913 to 1919.

== Early life and career ==
Born in Marion, Ohio, Key attended the public schools. He learned the printer's trade. He was a city letter carrier from 1897 to 1903. He was Recorder of Marion County from 1903 to 1908. He was Secretary to Representative Carl C. Anderson, of Ohio from 1908 to 1912.

== Congress ==
Key was elected as a Democrat to the Sixty-third, Sixty-fourth, and Sixty-fifth Congresses (March 4, 1913 – March 3, 1919). He served as chairman of the Committee on Pensions (Sixty-third through Sixty-fifth Congresses). He was an unsuccessful candidate for reelection in 1918 to the Sixty-sixth Congress.

== Later career and death ==
He engaged in the petroleum industry. He served as inspector of Federal prisons from 1934 until his retirement in 1941.

=== Death ===
He died in Marion, Ohio, March 4, 1954, at the age of 82. He was interred in Marion Cemetery.

== Sources ==
- United States Congress. "John A. Key (id: K000157)". Biographical Directory of the United States Congress.

U.S. House of Representatives
Preceded by Carl C. Anderson	Member of the U.S. House of Representatives from Ohio's 13th congressional district 1913-1915	Succeeded by Arthur W. Overmyer
Preceded by Frank B. Willis	Member of the U.S. House of Representatives from Ohio's 8th congressional district 1915-1919	Succeeded by R. Clint Cole
