= Stephen Ross Harris =

American politician

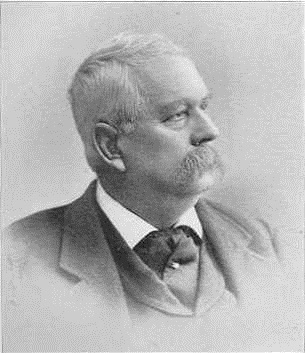

Member of the U.S. House of Representatives from Ohio's 13th district
- In office March 4, 1895 – March 3, 1897
- Preceded by: Darius D. Hare
- Succeeded by: James A. Norton

Personal details
- Born: May 22, 1824 Wayne County, Ohio, U.S.
- Died: January 15, 1905 (aged 80) Bucyrus, Ohio, U.S.
- Resting place: Oakwood Cemetery, Bucyrus
- Party: Republican
- Spouse: Mary Jane Monnett
- Children: 4
- Education: Washington College; Western Reserve College
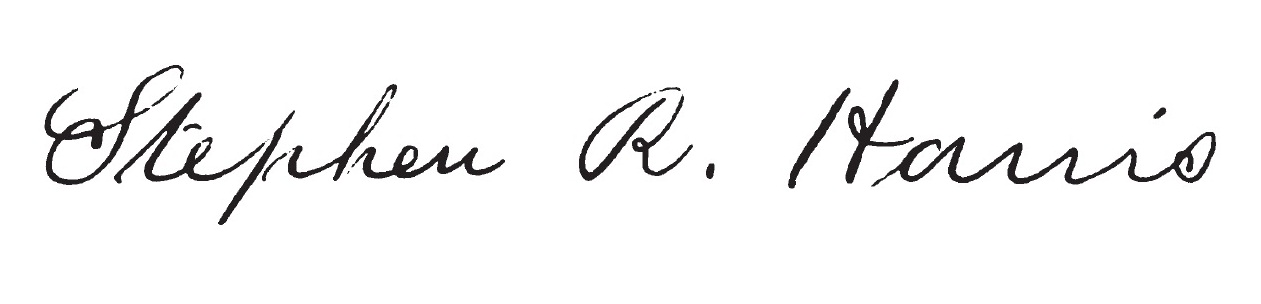
- Signature

Stephen Ross Harris (May 22, 1824 – January 15, 1905) was an American lawyer and politician who served one term as a U.S. representative from Ohio from 1895 to 1897. He was an uncle of Ebenezer Byron Finley.

== Biography ==
Born seven miles west of Massillon, Ohio, Harris attended the common and select schools, Washington College (Pennsylvania), Norwalk (Ohio) Seminary, and Western Reserve College, then at Hudson, Ohio. He studied law. He was admitted to the bar in 1849 and commenced practice in Columbus, Ohio. He moved to Bucyrus, Ohio, the same year and continued the practice of law. He became law partner of Josiah Scott from 1850 to Scott's death in 1879, except that time Scott was on the Ohio Supreme Court. He served as mayor of Bucyrus 1852, 1853, 1861, and 1862. Deputy United States marshal in 1861. He served as president of the Ohio State Bar Association in 1893 and 1894.

Harris was elected as a Republican to the Fifty-fourth Congress (March 4, 1895 - March 4, 1897). He was an unsuccessful candidate for reelection in 1896 to the Fifty-fifth Congress. He engaged in the practice of law in Bucyrus, Ohio, until his death there January 15, 1905. He was interred in Oakwood Cemetery. Harris was married September 15, 1853 to Mary Jane Monnett, who died in 1888, with two sons and two daughters surviving her.

== Sources ==
- United States Congress. "Stephen Ross Harris (id: H000253)". Biographical Directory of the United States Congress.

U.S. House of Representatives
| Preceded by Darius D. Hare | Member of the U.S. House of Representatives from Ohio's 13th congressional district 1895-1897 | Succeeded by James A. Norton |
