= William R. Warnock =

American politician

William Robert Warnock
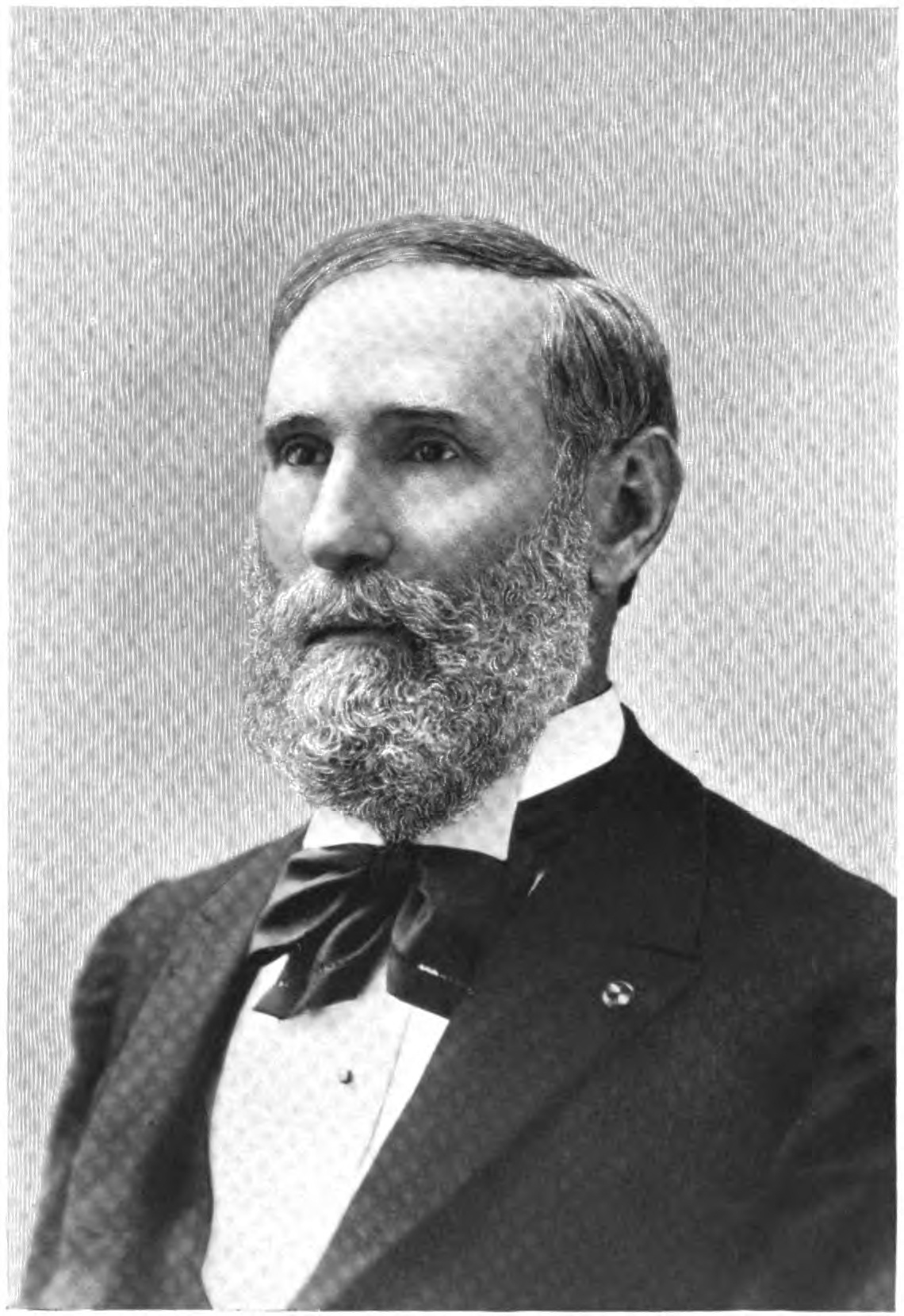
- circa 1897

Member of the U.S. House of Representatives from Ohio's 8th district
- In office March 4, 1901 – March 3, 1905
- Preceded by: Archibald Lybrand
- Succeeded by: Ralph D. Cole

Member of the Ohio Senate from the 11th district
- In office January 3, 1876 – January 6, 1878
- Preceded by: Alex Waddle
- Succeeded by: George W. Wilson

Personal details
- Born: August 29, 1838 Urbana, Ohio
- Died: July 30, 1918 (aged 79) Urbana, Ohio
- Resting place: Oakdale Cemetery
- Party: Republican
- Spouse: Catherine Murray
- Children: three
- Education: Ohio Wesleyan University
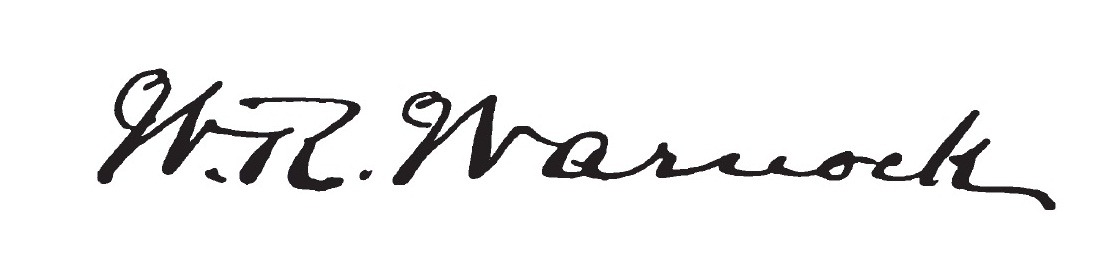
- Signature

William Robert Warnock (August 29, 1838 – July 30, 1918) was an American lawyer, politician, and veteran of the Civil War who served two terms as a U.S. representative from Ohio from 1901 to 1905.

== Biography ==
Born in Urbana, Ohio, Warnock attended public schools. He taught school in Urbana 1856-1868. During this time, he graduated from Ohio Wesleyan University, Delaware, Ohio, in 1861. He then commenced the study of law.

=== Civil War ===
He entered the Union Army on July 21, 1862, as captain of Company G, 95th Ohio Infantry. He was promoted to major on July 28, 1863, he was promoted to major and further promoted on March 15, 1865 to become a brevetted lieutenant colonel. From April to August 1865, Warnock was the Chief of staff for the Eastern District of Mississippi. He mustered out August 14, 1865.

=== Career ===
Warnock then resumed the study of law and was admitted to the bar in 1866 and commenced practice in Urbana. He served as prosecuting attorney 1868-1872. Warnock also served as member of the board of school examiners of Champaign County 1870-1876. Along with his position as a trustee of Ohio Wesleyan University, which he held for twenty-five years, Warnock was also a member of the Ohio State Senate in 1876 and 1877. Warnock also resided as the judge of the court of common pleas in the second district of Ohio from 1879 through 1889. Warnock was also the president of the National Bank of Urbana.

=== Congress ===
Warnock was elected as a Republican to the Fifty-seventh and Fifty-eighth Congresses (March 4, 1901 – March 3, 1905). He served as chairman of the Committee on Expenditures in the Department of War (Fifty-eighth Congress). However, he was not a candidate for renomination. He became a United States pension agent in Columbus, Ohio from 1906 to 1910. Warnock then held a position as the Commander of the department of Ohio, Grand Army of the Republic, in 1913 and 1914.

=== Death ===
Warnock died in Urbana, Ohio, July 30, 1918 and was interred in Oakdale Cemetery.

=== Family ===
Warnock was married August 20, 1868 to Catherine Murray of Clark County and had three children.

Warnock was a Methodist, a member of the Grand Army of the Republic, and a Freemason.

U.S. House of Representatives
Preceded by Archibald Lybrand	Member of the U.S. House of Representatives from Ohio's 8th congressional district 1901-1905	Succeeded by Ralph D. Cole
