= Luther M. Strong =

American politician

Luther Martin Strong
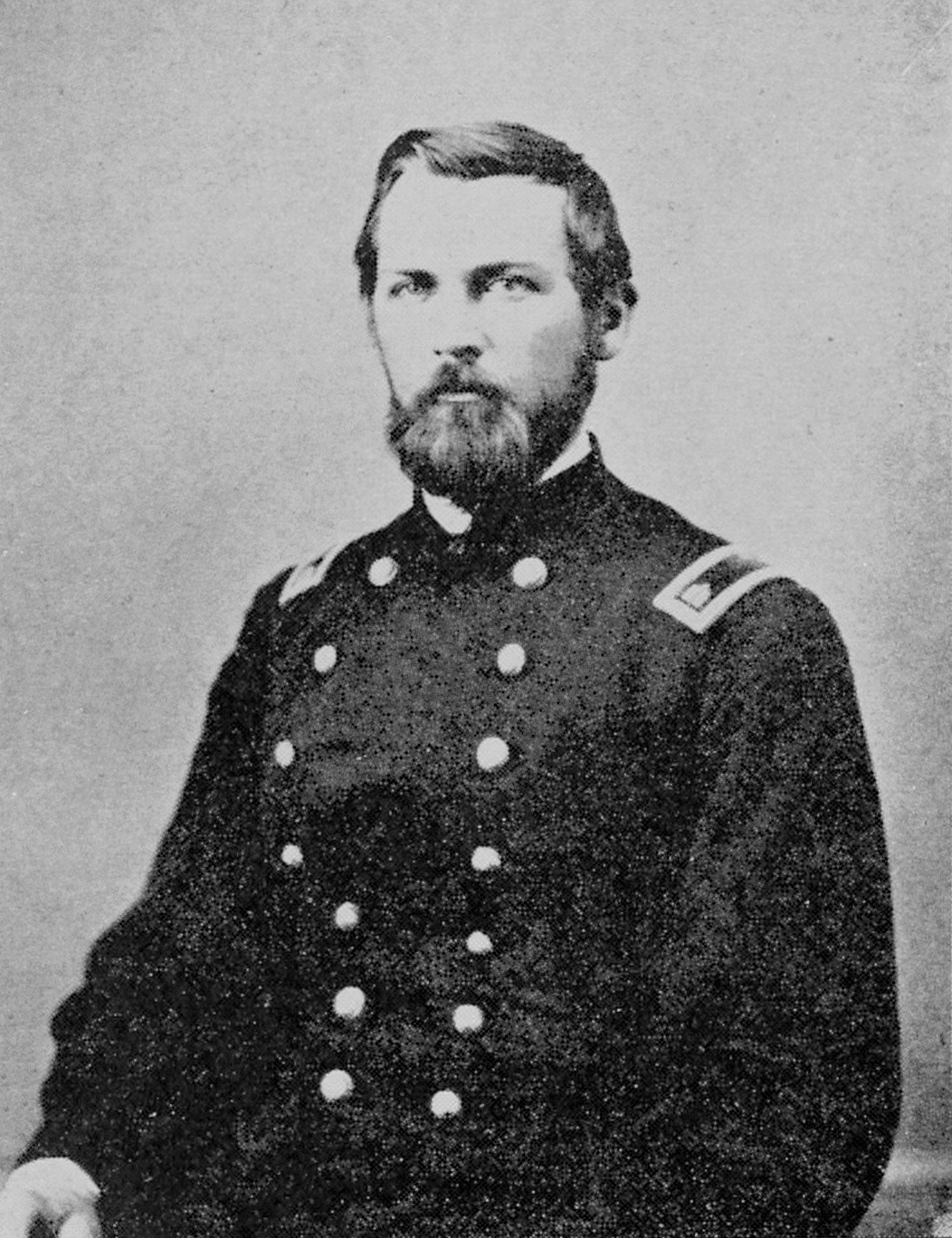

Member of the U.S. House of Representatives from Ohio's 8th district
- In office March 4, 1893 – March 3, 1897
- Preceded by: Darius D. Hare
- Succeeded by: Archibald Lybrand

Member of the Ohio Senate from the 13th district
- In office January 5, 1880 – January 6, 1884
- Preceded by: Hylas Sabine
- Succeeded by: John J. Hane

Personal details
- Born: June 23, 1838 Tiffin, Ohio, U.S.
- Died: April 26, 1903 (aged 64) Kenton, Ohio, U.S.
- Party: Republican

Luther Martin Strong (June 23, 1838 – April 26, 1903) was an American lawyer, jurist, and veteran of the Civil War who served two terms as a U.S. representative from Ohio from 1893 to 1897.

== Biography ==
Born near Tiffin, Ohio, Strong attended the common schools and Aaron Schuyler's Academy, Republic, Ohio. He taught school.

He enlisted in the Forty-ninth Regiment, Ohio Volunteer Infantry, in 1861 and served until March 13, 1865.

He studied law and was admitted to the bar by the Supreme Court of Ohio on January 30, 1867. He moved to Kenton and practiced his profession. He served as member of the board of education.

He was elected to the State senate in 1879 and 1881. He was appointed judge of the court of common pleas by Governor Foster in 1883 to fill an unexpired term.

=== Congress ===
Strong was elected as a Republican to the Fifty-third and Fifty-fourth Congresses (March 4, 1893 – March 3, 1897). He was an unsuccessful candidate for renomination in 1896 to the Fifty-fifth Congress.

=== Later career and death ===
He engaged in agricultural pursuits.

He died in Kenton, Ohio, April 26, 1903. He was interred in Grove Cemetery.

== Sources ==
- United States Congress. "Luther M. Strong (id: S001014)". Biographical Directory of the United States Congress.

U.S. House of Representatives
Preceded by Darius D. Hare	Member of the U.S. House of Representatives from Ohio's 8th congressional district 1893-1897	Succeeded by Archibald Lybrand
