= Amos H. Jackson =

American politician

Amos Henry Jackson
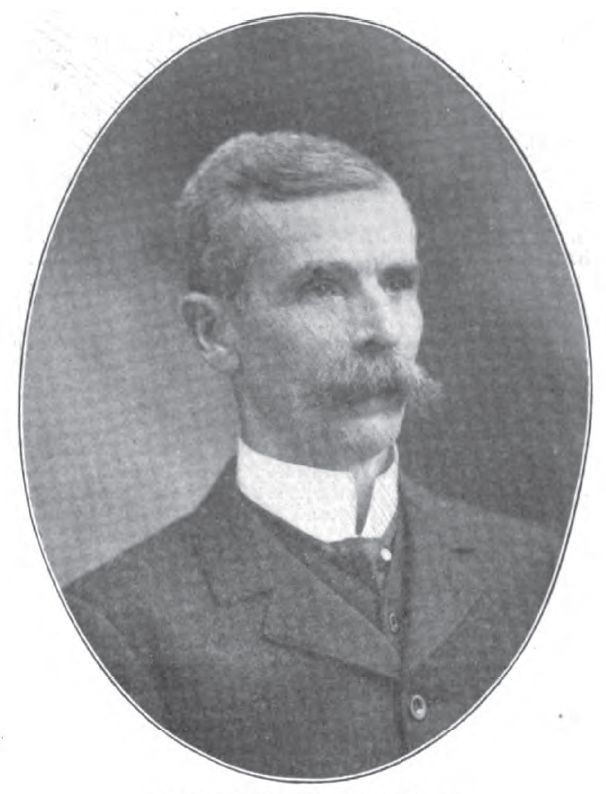

Member of the U.S. House of Representatives from Ohio's 13th district
- In office March 4, 1903 – March 3, 1905
- Preceded by: James A. Norton
- Succeeded by: Grant E. Mouser

Personal details
- Born: May 10, 1846 Franklin, New York
- Died: August 30, 1924 (aged 78) Fremont, Ohio
- Resting place: Oakwood Cemetery
- Party: Republican

Amos Henry Jackson (May 10, 1846 – August 30, 1924) was a U.S. representative from Ohio for one term from 1903 to 1905.

== Biography ==
Born near Franklin, New York, Jackson moved with his parents to Gibson, New York, in 1854 and to a farm near Corning, New York, in 1862, where he attended the common schools. He moved to Ohio in 1866. He was employed as a carpenter for several years and then engaged in selling notions from a wagon. He settled in Fremont, Ohio, in 1882 and engaged in the retail dry goods and shoe business and later engaged in manufactures. He served as mayor of Fremont 1897–1901.

Jackson was elected as a Republican to the Fifty-eighth Congress (March 4, 1903 – March 3, 1905). He was not a candidate for renomination in 1904. He resumed manufacturing interests in Fremont, Ohio, until 1922 when he retired. He died in Fremont, Ohio, on August 30, 1924. He was interred in Oakwood Cemetery.

== Sources ==
- United States Congress. "Amos H. Jackson (id: J000004)". Biographical Directory of the United States Congress.

U.S. House of Representatives
Preceded by James A. Norton	Member of the U.S. House of Representatives from Ohio's 13th congressional district 1903–1905	Succeeded by Grant E. Mouser
