= 1920 Ohio gubernatorial election =

- November 2, 1920
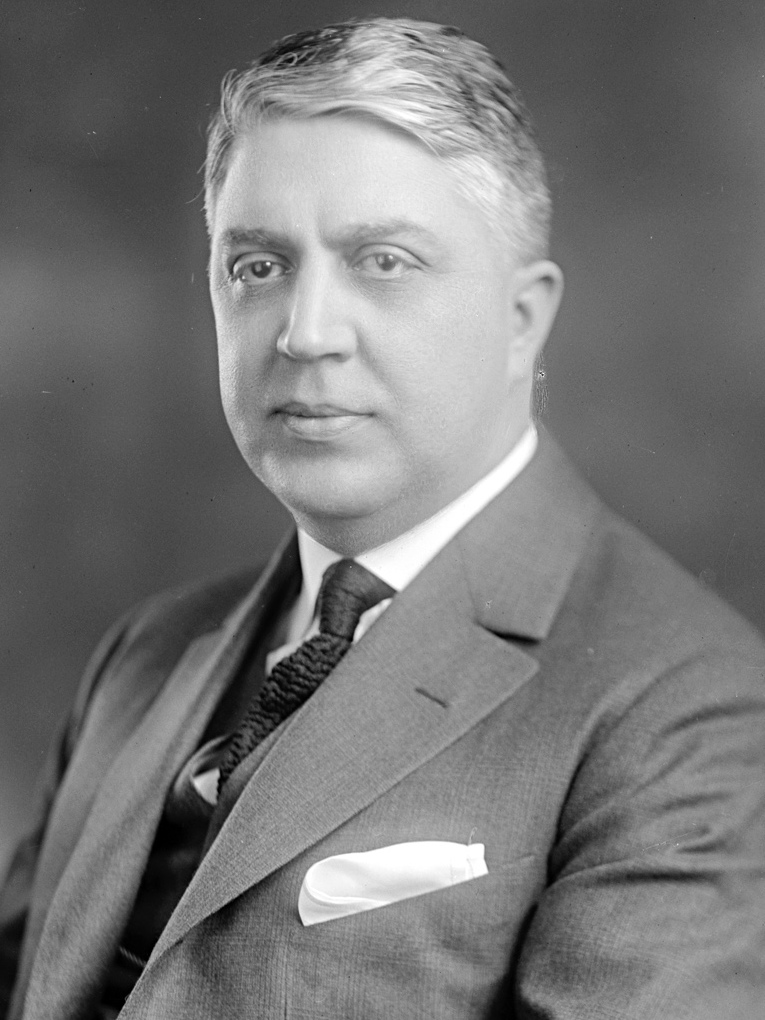

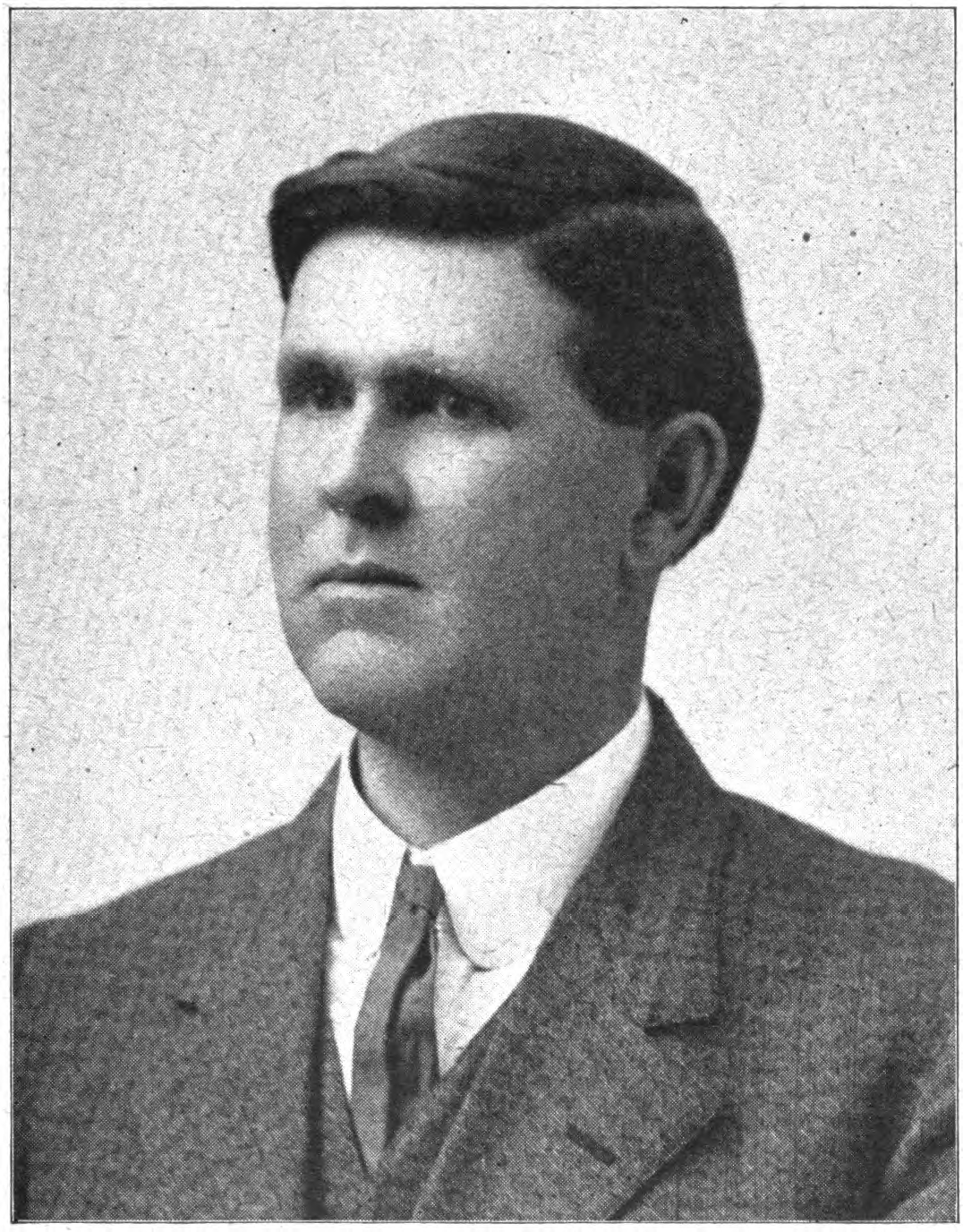
Nominee	Harry L. Davis	A. Victor Donahey
Party	Republican	Democratic
Popular vote	1,039,835	918,962
Percentage	51.91%	45.88%
- County results Davis: 40–50% 50–60% 60–70% Donahey: 40–50% 50–60% 60–70% 70–80%
Governor before election
James M. Cox
Democratic
Elected Governor
Harry L. Davis
Republican

The 1920 Ohio gubernatorial election was held on November 2, 1920. Republican nominee Harry L. Davis defeated Democratic nominee A. Victor Donahey with 51.91% of the vote.

== Primary elections ==
Primary elections were held on August 10, 1920.

=== Republican primary ===
==== Candidates ====
- Harry L. Davis, former mayor of Cleveland
- Ralph D. Cole, former U.S. Representative from Findlay
- Roscoe C. McCulloch, U.S. Representative from Canton
- David Wesley Wood

==== Results ====
Republican primary results
Party	Candidate	Votes	%
Republican	Harry L. Davis	139,789	39.95
Republican	Ralph D. Cole	124,889	35.70
Republican	Roscoe C. McCulloch	70,396	20.12
Republican	David Wesley Wood	14,803	4.23
Total votes		349,877	100.00

== General election ==
=== Candidates ===
Major party candidates

- Harry L. Davis, Republican
- A. Victor Donahey, Democratic

Other candidates

- Frank B. Hamilton, Socialist
- Earl H. Foote, Independent

=== Results ===
1920 Ohio gubernatorial election
Party	Candidate	Votes	%	±%
Republican	Harry L. Davis	1,039,835	51.91%	
Democratic	A. Victor Donahey	918,962	45.88%	
Socialist	Frank B. Hamilton	42,889	2.14%	
Independent	Earl H. Foote	1,497	0.08%	
Majority		120,873		
Turnout				
Republican gain from Democratic		Swing		
