= John W. Griffin (politician) =

John William Griffin (June 9, 1927 – March 23, 2006) was an Ohio farmer and a perennial candidate for various local, state, and federal offices in Ohio. While he lost far more political races than he won, at the time of his death he was a duly-elected member of the Ohio State Board of Education. A resident of Miami Township in south central Montgomery County, Ohio between Miamisburg and Germantown, he irritated party and education officials with his bids for office and had been the subject of scathing articles in the Dayton press.

Griffin was the son of Francis and Genevieve (Stenger) Griffin. He graduated from Jefferson Township High School and attended the University of Dayton. Griffin was a Catholic and a member of the Knights of Columbus.

Griffin won the Democratic nomination for U.S. Representative from Ohio's Eighth Congressional District in 1976, 1980, and 1982, each time losing to Republican incumbent Tom Kindness. In 1978, Griffin ran for Congress again, winning the Democratic nomination to challenge incumbent Republican Tennyson Guyer in the Fourth District. He was again unsuccessful.

Griffin ran again in the Eighth District in 1986 and 1988, both times losing to Kindness's successor Donald "Buz" Lukens. (Rather than seek re-election to the U.S. House of Representatives, Kindness had sought election to the U.S. Senate in 1986.) In 1998, Griffin again won the Democratic nomination in the Eighth District, defeating the Democratic party's endorsed candidate, but lost in the general election to Lukens's successor John Boehner. He sought the Democratic nomination in 2000 to challenge Boehner again, but lost the primary to John G. Parks – 15,924 (53 percent) for Parks, 14,126 (47 percent) for Griffin.

In 1976, Griffin ran as an alternate delegate to the Democratic National Convention, pledged to U.S. Rep. Morris K. Udall (D-Arizona) for President. Griffin was an elected member of the Ohio Democratic Party's State Central Committee for two decades, losing his seat in the mid-1990s. He unsuccessfully sought re-election to the committee in 1998 and 2000.

In 1990, he ran simultaneously for the Ohio House of Representatives from the 73rd district and the Ohio State Board of Education from the Eighth District, losing both races. Griffin was elected in 1992 to the Ohio State Board of Education, defeating three-term incumbent Chester A. Roush in the Third District for a two-year term. Griffin finished second to Diana M. Fessler in a six-candidate field in 1994 when he ran for a full four-year term. He moved to Minster, in northern Ohio, in 1996 to run against Virginia E. Jacobs for the First District seat on the Ohio State Board of Education and lost. In 1997, 1999, and 2001, he ran for the Board of Education of the Miamisburg City School District in Montgomery County and came in last all three times. In 2001, he was last in a field of six, receiving 993 votes (9.135%). In 1998, he again ran against Fessler in the Third District and again lost. Griffin campaigned against school vouchers and for reform of school funding in Ohio.

In 2002, Griffin again sought a seat on the State Board of Education. The Dayton Daily News that year ran a series of scathing pieces about Griffin's behavior during his first term on the state board and his tax problems. Dennis Lieberman, chairman of the Montgomery County Democratic Party, stated "He has constantly been an embarrassment to our whole community." Nevertheless, Griffin unseated Third District incumbent Carl Wick to return to the State Board of Education. Immediately after the election, party leaders in Dayton vowed they would try to remove him from office and the Daily News ran more scathing opinions – one writer called him a "rat" – but Griffin served on the board until his death. "I am so disillusioned with our electorate," Lieberman said after Griffin's election.

Griffin died at Middletown Regional Hospital in Middletown, Ohio at age 78. "He was an advocate for children, and his work on the state board of education reflected his desire to see all Ohio students succeed in the classroom," said J.C. Benton of the Ohio Department of Education upon the occasion of Griffin's death.

== See also ==
- List of Knights of Columbus members
- Ohio's 4th congressional district
- Ohio's 8th congressional district
