= List of mayors of Hamilton, Ohio =

The following is a list of mayors of the city of Hamilton, Ohio, United States.

- Robert Hargitt, 1855-1857
- John S. Wiles, 1857-1859
- Ransford Smith, 1859-1861
- Daniel Longfellow, 1861-1866
- A. C. Stephenson, 1866-1871
- M. N. Maginnis, 1871-1873, 1875-1877
- J. B. Lawder, 1873-1875
- Edward Hughes, 1877-1879
- Frederick Egry, 1879-1881
- F. B. Puthoff, 1881-1883
- D. B. Sanders, 1883-1887
- Alex. Getz, 1887-1889
- John Dirk, 1889-1891
- L. M. Larsh, 1891-1893
- Charles S. Bosch, 1893-1897
- Thad. Straub, c.1912-1914
- Culla J. Smith, c.1919-1920
- Raymond H. Burke, c.1928-1940
- Leo J. Welsh
- William Beckett, c.1951
- George E. Radcliffe, c.1952-1953
- Arthur Wilson, c.1954
- Thomas N. Kindness, 1964-1967
- Mark C. Petty, c.1971
- Geo. V. McNally, c.1984
- Thomas E. Nye, c.1999
- Donald V. Ryan, 2002-2010
- Pat Moeller, 2010-present

== See also ==
- Hamilton history
