= R. Clint Cole =

American lawyer and politician

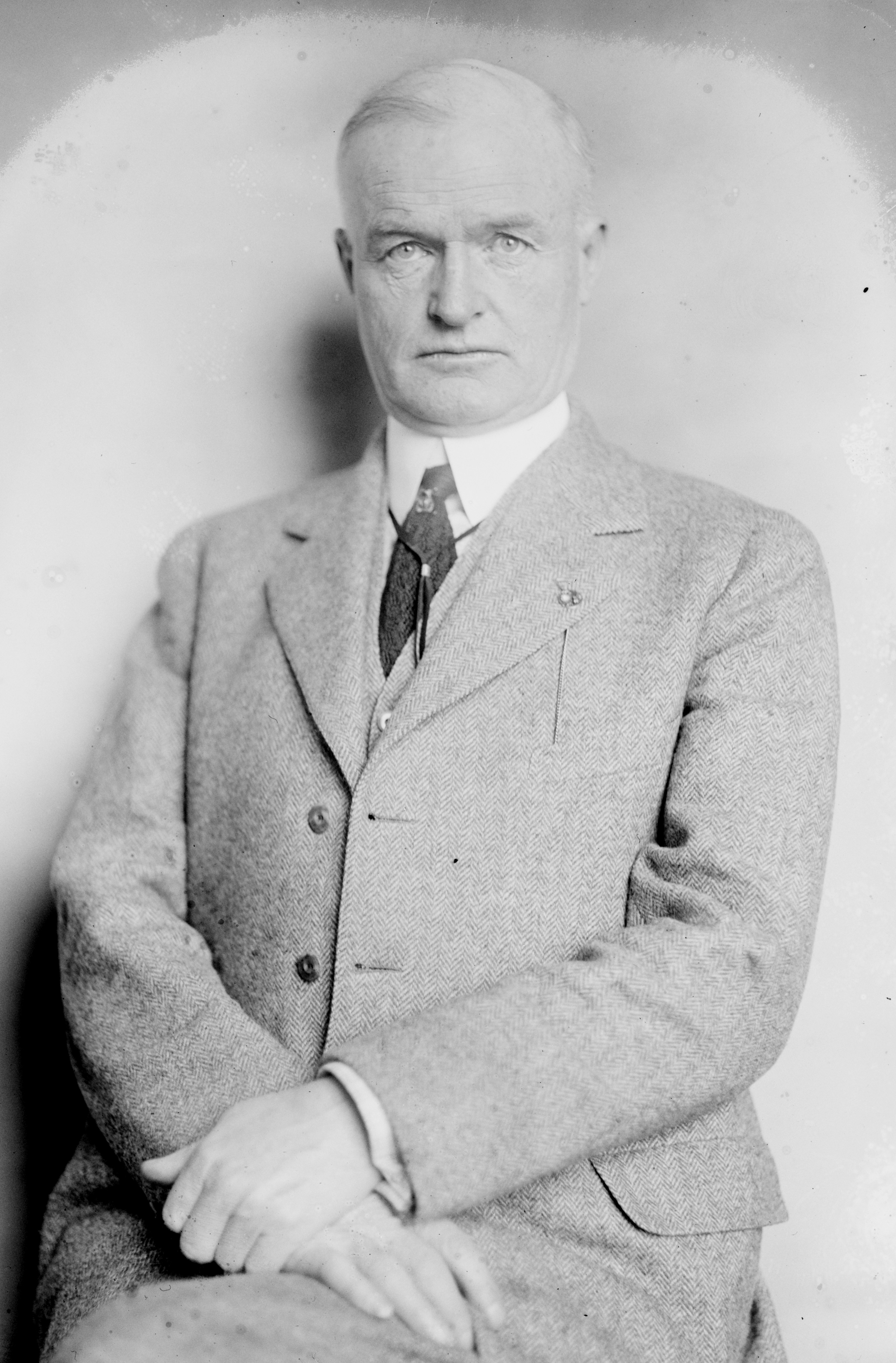

Member of the U.S. House of Representatives from Ohio's 8th district
- In office March 4, 1919 – March 3, 1925
- Preceded by: John A. Key
- Succeeded by: Thomas B. Fletcher

Personal details
- Born: Raymond Clinton Cole; August 21, 1870 Biglick Township, Ohio, U.S.
- Died: February 8, 1957 (aged 86) Findlay, Ohio, U.S.
- Resting place: Bright Cemetery
- Party: Republican
- Education: Findlay College; Ohio Northern University Pettit College of Law

Raymond Clinton Cole (August 21, 1870 – February 8, 1957) was an American lawyer and politician who served three terms a U.S. Representative from Ohio from 1919 to 1925. He was the brother of Ralph Dayton Cole, who also served in Congress.

== Biography ==
Born in Biglick Township, near Findlay, Ohio, Cole attended the common schools and Findlay College, Findlay, Ohio. He taught school nine years. He was graduated from the law department of Ohio Northern University at Ada in 1900.

He was admitted to the bar of Ohio the same year and commenced practice in Findlay, Ohio, in 1901.

=== National Guard ===
He served as member of the Ohio National Guard from 1903 to 1913. He served as city solicitor from 1912 to 1916.

=== Congress ===
Cole was elected as a Republican to the Sixty-sixth, Sixty-seventh, and Sixty-eighth Congresses (March 4, 1919 – March 3, 1925). He served as chairman of the Committee on Elections No. 1 (Sixty-eighth Congress).

He was an unsuccessful candidate for reelection in 1924 to the Sixty-ninth Congress.

He resumed the practice of law.

=== Death and burial ===
He died in Findlay, Ohio, on February 8, 1957. He was interred in Bright Cemetery.

== Electoral history ==
Year	Democratic	Republican	Other
1920	Fred H. Guthery: 36,665	√ Clint Cole (incumbent): 43,473	
1922	H. H. Hartmann: 34,105	√ Clint Cole (incumbent): 37,065	
1924	√ Thomas B. Fletcher: 38,439	Clint Cole (incumbent): 33,258	Charles E. Lukens: 555

== Sources ==
- Media related to R. Clint Cole at Wikimedia Commons
- United States Congress. "R. Clint Cole (id: C000613)". Biographical Directory of the United States Congress.

U.S. House of Representatives
Preceded by John A. Key	Member of the U.S. House of Representatives from Ohio's 8th congressional district 1919-1925	Succeeded by Thomas B. Fletcher
