= Jackson Betts =

American politician (1904–1993)

Jackson Edward Betts
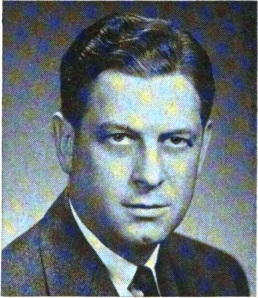
- c. 1955

Member of the U.S. House of Representatives from Ohio's 8th district
- In office January 3, 1951 – January 3, 1973
- Preceded by: Frederick Cleveland Smith
- Succeeded by: Walter E. Powell

Speaker of the Ohio House of Representatives
- In office January 1, 1945 – January 5, 1947
- Preceded by: William M. McCulloch
- Succeeded by: C. William O'Neill

Member of the Ohio House of Representatives
- In office 1937–1947

Personal details
- Born: May 26, 1904 Findlay, Ohio
- Died: August 13, 1993 (aged 89) Findlay, Ohio
- Party: Republican
- Education: Kenyon College; Yale Law School

Jackson Edward Betts (May 26, 1904 – August 13, 1993) was a Republican member of the U.S. House of Representatives from Ohio from 1951 to 1973. He also served as Speaker of the House in the Ohio Legislature.

== Early life and career ==
Jackson Edward Betts was born in Findlay, Ohio, to John and Elizabeth (Fisher) Betts. He graduated from Kenyon College in Gambier, Ohio, in 1926, and from Yale Law School in New Haven, Connecticut, in 1929. He was admitted to the bar in 1930, and commenced the practice of law in Findlay, Ohio. He served as prosecuting attorney of Hancock County, Ohio, from 1933 to 1937.

== Legislative career ==
He was a member of the Ohio House of Representatives from 1937 to 1947, serving as speaker in 1945 and 1946.

In 1972, near the end of his final term in office, he was honored with the SAR Legislator's Award by the National Society Sons of the American Revolution (SAR). His membership in the society was traced back to his ancestral descent from Hezekiah Betts, a Continental Army sergeant from Norwalk, Connecticut who fought in the Revolutionary War.

== Congress ==
Betts was elected as a Republican to the Eighty-second and to the ten succeeding Congresses. He was not a candidate in 1972 for reelection to the Ninety-third Congress. He was a part-time teacher at Findlay College from 1973 to 1983 and acting judge of Findlay Municipal Court from 1981 to 1989. He was a resident of Findlay, Ohio, until his death there on August 13, 1993. Betts voted in favor of the Civil Rights Acts of 1957, 1960, 1964, and 1968, and the Voting Rights Act of 1965.

== Death ==
He died in 1993 in Findlay, Ohio at the age of 89.

== Sources ==
- United States Congress. "Jackson Betts (id: B000426)". Biographical Directory of the United States Congress.
- The Political Graveyard

U.S. House of Representatives
Preceded by Frederick C. Smith	Member of the U.S. House of Representatives from Ohio's 8th congressional district 1951–1973	Succeeded by Walter E. Powell
