= James A. Norton =

American politician

James Albert Norton
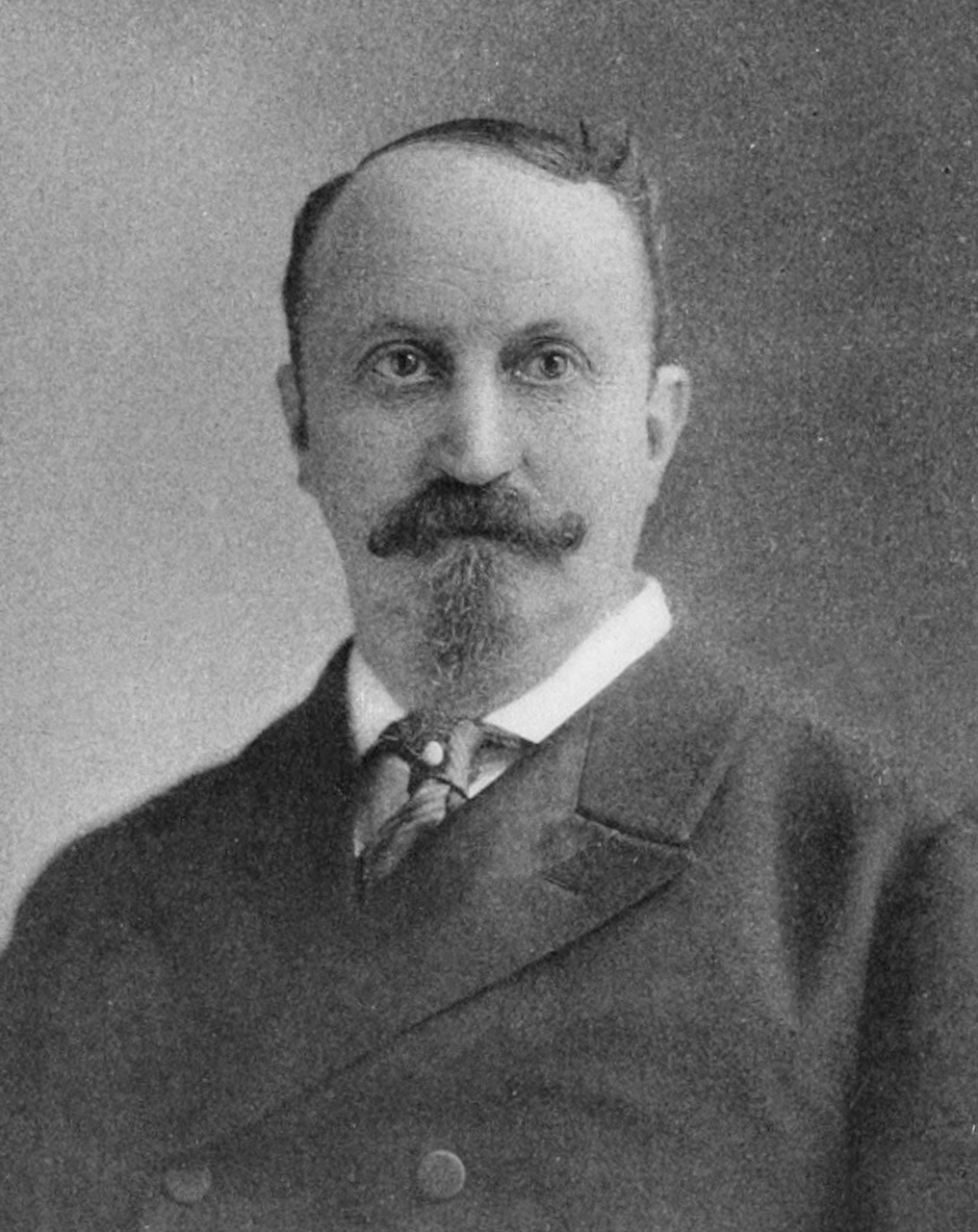

Member of the U.S. House of Representatives from Ohio's 13th district
- In office March 4, 1897 – March 3, 1903
- Preceded by: Stephen Ross Harris
- Succeeded by: Amos H. Jackson

Member of the Ohio House of Representatives from the Seneca County district
- In office January 5, 1874 – January 3, 1880
- Preceded by: John Seitz
- Succeeded by: Amos Decker

Personal details
- Born: November 11, 1843 Bettsville, Ohio, U.S.
- Died: July 24, 1912 (aged 68) Tiffin, Ohio, U.S.
- Resting place: Green Lawn Cemetery (Tiffin, Ohio)
- Party: Democratic

James Albert Norton (November 11, 1843 – July 24, 1912) was an American educator and Civil War veteran who served three terms a U.S. representative from Ohio from 1897 to 1903.

== Biography ==
Norton was born in Bettsville, Ohio, and attended the district schools where he graduated from Tiffin High School.

During the Civil War he enlisted in the Union Army in August 1862. He was a sergeant in Company K, One Hundred and First Regiment, Ohio Volunteer Infantry. He was later promoted to first lieutenant and adjutant of the One Hundred and Twenty-third Regiment, United States Colored Infantry, in 1864.

He mustered out of the service in 1865.

== Postbellum ==
After the war Norton studied medicine and commenced practice in Ohio in 1867 and continued in that profession until 1879.

He studied law and was admitted to the bar in 1879.

He served as member of the State house of representatives 1873-1879, and as chairman of the State Democratic committee 1887-1892.

From 1885-1892, he served as Seneca county auditor and as commissioner of railroads and telegraphs from 1889 to 1895, when he resigned to accept a position in the legal department of the Baltimore and Ohio Railroad.

== Congress ==
Norton was elected as a Democrat to the Fifty-fifth, Fifty-sixth, and Fifty-seventh Congresses (March 4, 1897 - March 3, 1903).

He was an unsuccessful candidate for reelection in 1902 to the Fifty-eighth Congress and resumed legal service with the Baltimore and Ohio Railroad.

== Death ==
He died July 24, 1912, in Tiffin, Ohio, and was interred in the mausoleum of Greenlawn Cemetery in Tiffin.

U.S. House of Representatives
Preceded by Stephen Ross Harris	Member of the U.S. House of Representatives from Ohio's 13th congressional district 1897-1903	Succeeded by Amos H. Jackson
