= Carl C. Anderson =

American politician

Carl Carey Anderson
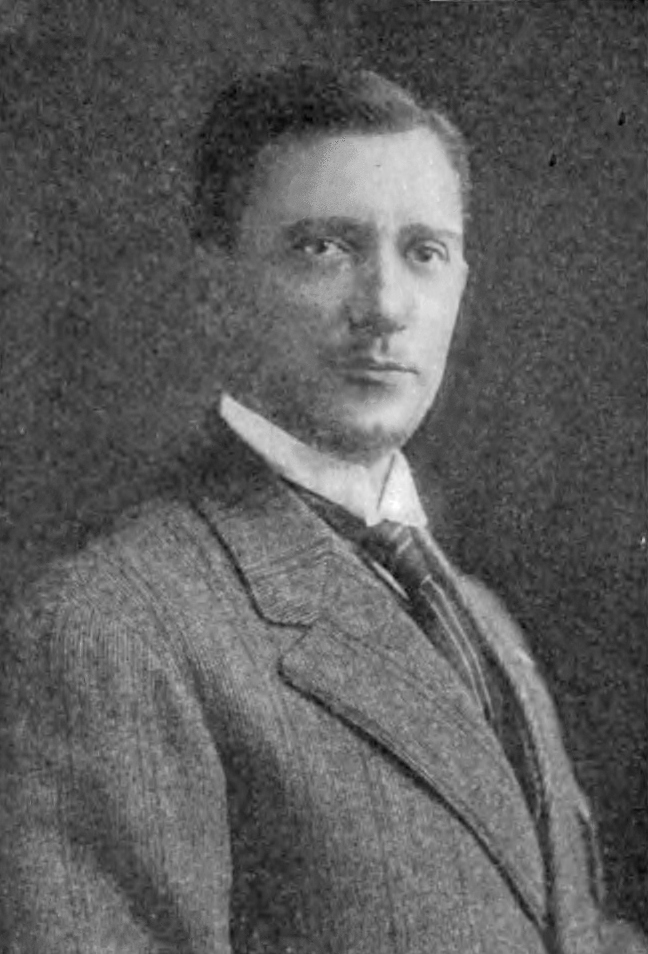

Member of the U.S. House of Representatives from Ohio's 13th district
- In office March 4, 1909 – October 1, 1912
- Preceded by: Grant E. Mouser
- Succeeded by: John A. Key

Personal details
- Born: December 2, 1877 Bluffton, Ohio, US
- Died: October 1, 1912 (aged 34) Fostoria, Ohio, US
- Resting place: Oakwood Cemetery (Fremont, Ohio)
- Party: Democratic

Carl Carey Anderson (December 2, 1877 – October 1, 1912) was a U.S. representative from Ohio. He was elected to two terms, serving from 1909 until 1912, when he died as a result of an automobile accident at the age of 34.

== Early life and career ==
Born in Bluffton, Ohio, Anderson moved to Sandusky County in 1881 with his parents, who settled in Fremont. He attended the common schools, and then worked as a traveling salesman. He moved to Fostoria, Seneca County, and engaged in the manufacture of underwear.

== Political career ==
Anderson was elected mayor of Fostoria, Ohio, in 1905 and again in 1907, on each occasion for a term of two years. He served as president of the city hospital board and director in a number of manufacturing enterprises.

== Congress ==
Anderson was elected as a Democrat to the Sixty-first and Sixty-second Congresses and served from March 4, 1909, until his death in an automobile accident near Fostoria, Ohio, October 1, 1912.

He was interred in Oakwood Cemetery (Fremont, Ohio).

== See also ==
- List of members of the United States Congress who died in office (1900–1949)

== Sources ==
- United States Congress. "Carl C. Anderson (id: A000182)". Biographical Directory of the United States Congress.
- Carl C. Anderson, late a representative from Ohio, Memorial addresses delivered in the House of Representatives and Senate frontispiece 1913

U.S. House of Representatives
Preceded by Grant E. Mouser	Member of the U.S. House of Representatives from Ohio's 13th congressional district 1909-1912	Succeeded by John A. Key
