= Grant E. Mouser =

American politician

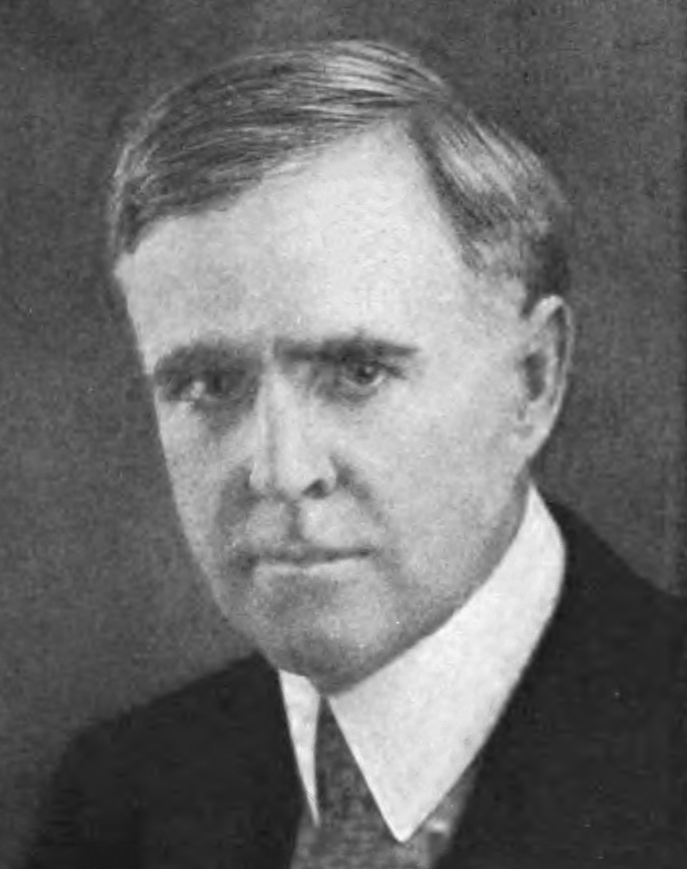

Member of the U.S. House of Representatives from Ohio's 13th district
- In office March 4, 1905 – March 3, 1909
- Preceded by: Amos H. Jackson
- Succeeded by: Carl C. Anderson

Personal details
- Born: Grant Earl Mouser; September 11, 1868 LaRue, Ohio, U.S.
- Died: May 6, 1949 (aged 80) Marion, Ohio, U.S.
- Resting place: Marion Cemetery
- Party: Republican
- Spouse: Della E. Ridgway
- Children: 3
- Education: Ohio Northern University; Cincinnati Law School

Grant Earl Mouser (September 11, 1868 – May 6, 1949) was a U.S. representative from Ohio for two terms from 1905 to 1909. He was the father of Grant E. Mouser Jr., who also became a United States Congressman from Ohio.

== Biography ==
Born in LaRue, Ohio, Mouser attended the LaRue Union Schools and Ohio Northern University, Ada, Ohio. He graduated from the Cincinnati Law School in 1890 and was admitted to the bar the same year. He commenced practice of law in Marion, Ohio, where he served as prosecuting attorney of Marion County from 1893 to 1896. He served as a delegate to many state conventions.

=== Family and personal life ===
Mouser was the son of Justus and Sara (DeLong) Mouser.

Mouser married Della E. Ridgway, of LaRue, November 28, 1892. They had three children: Helena, Grant Earl Jr., and Annabel.

Mouser was a member of the Presbyterian Church, B.P.O.E., K. of P. and I.O.O.F.

=== Congress ===
In 1904 Mouser ran for and was elected as a Republican to the 59th Congress. He successfully ran for re-election in 1906, serving in the 60th Congress.

=== Later career ===
He was an unsuccessful candidate for re-election in 1908 to the 61st Congress.

After the election, he resumed practicing law in Marion until his retirement in 1935. He also served as delegate to the 1908 Republican National Convention. From 1916 to 1925, he served as a judge in the Court of Common Pleas of Marion County.

=== Harding patrimony controversy ===
Mouser cross-examined Nan Britton in Britton's lawsuit (Britton v. Klunk), in which she claimed that the late U.S. President Warren G. Harding was the father of her daughter Elizabeth Ann Blaesing. Britton was unable to provide any concrete evidence, and was shaken by the vicious personal attacks made by Mouser, which cost her the case. Carl Sferrazza Anthony, author of Florence Harding, a biography of Harding's wife, wrote that court transcripts in Toledo, Ohio, show that Mouser referred to Britton as a "degenerate and pervert", and "brought (Florence Kling Harding) in by using Warren's 'love of his good wife' against a 'distorted... deranged... demented... [and] diabolical' Nan who had no respect for the marriage tie...."

DNA testing in 2015 confirmed that Blaesing was indeed Harding's daughter.

=== Death ===
Mouser died in Marion, Ohio, May 6, 1949 and is interred in Marion Cemetery.

U.S. House of Representatives
Preceded by Amos H. Jackson	Member of the U.S. House of Representatives from Ohio's 13th congressional district 1905–1909	Succeeded by Carl C. Anderson
