= 1986 United States Senate election in Ohio =

- November 4, 1986
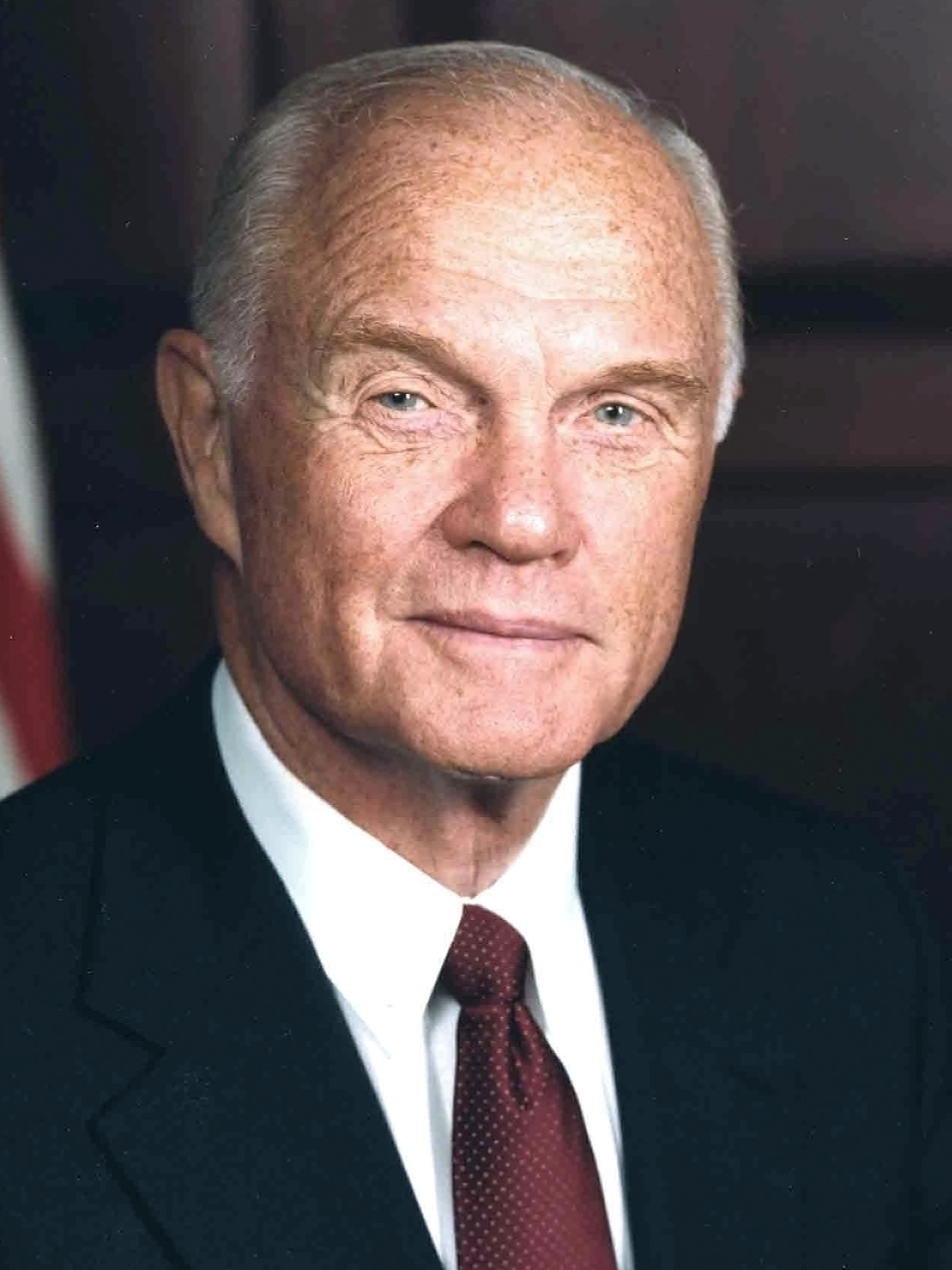

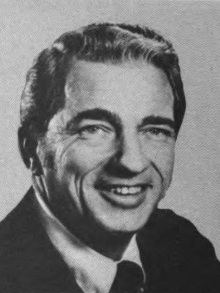
Nominee	John Glenn	Tom Kindness
Party	Democratic	Republican
Popular vote	1,949,208	1,171,893
Percentage	62.45%	37.55%
- Glenn: 50–60% 60–70% 70–80% 80–90% >90% Kindness: 50–60% 60–70% 70–80% 80–90% >90%
U.S. senator before election
John Glenn
Democratic
Elected U.S. Senator
John Glenn
Democratic

The 1986 United States Senate election in Ohio took place on November 4, 1986. It was concurrent with elections to the United States House of Representatives. Incumbent Democratic U.S Senator John Glenn won re-election to a third term.

== General election ==
=== Candidates ===
- Kathleen M. Button (Independent)
- John Glenn, incumbent U.S. Senator (Democratic)
- William M. Harris (Independent)
- Tom Kindness, U.S. Representative from Hamilton (Republican)

=== Results ===
1986 United States Senate election in Ohio
Party	Candidate	Votes	%
Democratic	John Glenn (incumbent)	1,949,208	62.45%
Republican	Tom Kindness	1,171,893	37.55%
Independent	Kathleen M. Button (write-in)	59	0.00%
Independent	William M. Harris (write-in)	29	0.00%
Democratic hold			

== See also ==
- 1986 United States Senate elections
