= Buz Lukens =

American politician and sex offender

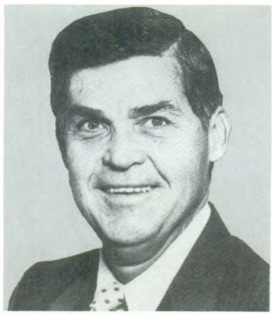

Member of the U.S. House of Representatives from Ohio
- In office January 3, 1987 – October 24, 1990
- Preceded by: Tom Kindness
- Succeeded by: John Boehner
- Constituency: 8th district
- In office January 3, 1967 – January 3, 1971
- Preceded by: Constituency established
- Succeeded by: Walter E. Powell
- Constituency: 24th district

Member of the Ohio Senate from the 4th district
- In office January 3, 1971 – January 2, 1987
- Preceded by: Walter E. Powell
- Succeeded by: Barry Levey

Personal details
- Born: Donald Edgar Lukens; February 11, 1931 Harveysburg, Ohio, U.S.
- Died: May 22, 2010 (aged 79) Dallas, Texas, U.S.
- Party: Republican
- Education: Ohio State University (BA); University of Maryland, College Park

Donald Edgar "Buz" Lukens (February 11, 1931 – May 22, 2010) was an American politician, criminal, and sex offender. He was a Republican member of the United States House of Representatives from Ohio from 1967 to 1971, and again from 1987 to 1990. His political career ended in 1990 when he was charged with contributing to the delinquency of a minor. Six years later, he was convicted for accepting a bribe during his time in Congress.

== Early years ==
Lukens was born at Harveysburg, Ohio. He attended schools in Harveysburg and graduated from high school in Waynesville, Ohio. He earned a bachelor's degree from Ohio State University in Columbus, Ohio in 1954. After finishing college, Lukens joined the U.S. Air Force, reaching the rank of captain after six-and-a-half years of active duty. Remaining a member of the Air Force Reserve, in 1961 Lukens accepted a job as minority counsel for the Republican staff of the House Rules Committee.

== Political career ==
Lukens was president of the national Young Republicans in the early 1960s.

=== Congress ===
In 1966, Lukens won a seat in the United States House of Representatives, defeating Democrat James H. Pelley. He began serving in the House in 1967 (90th Congress). In 1968, Lukens won re-election, defeating Democrat Lloyd D. Miller. Lukens chose not to run again for the House seat in 1970. Instead, he made a run for Governor of Ohio. However, Lukens was defeated in the Republican primary by Roger Cloud, who went on to lose the general election to Democrat John J. Gilligan.

Lukens was a supporter of California Governor Ronald Reagan's campaign for the Republican nomination for president in 1968.

Lukens then was appointed to the Ohio State Senate, serving from 1971 to 1986. In 1986, Tom Kindness, who held Lukens’ old seat, opted to challenge U.S. Senator John Glenn rather than run for re-election. Lukens sought to take back his old seat, and defeated perennial Democratic candidate John W. Griffin. Lukens started serving this term in 1987 (101st Congress). In 1988, Lukens won re-election, defeating Griffin once again.

== Sex scandals and resignation ==
On February 1, 1989, an Ohio television station caught Lukens on camera at a Columbus, Ohio, McDonald's restaurant talking with the mother of a teenage girl, and openly discussing his sexual relationship with the girl. Soon afterward, a grand jury brought charges against him of contributing to the delinquency of a minor because of allegations that he paid the girl $40 and gifts in exchange for sex when she was 16 years old. Further allegations had been made that the relationship with the girl began when she was 13, but a grand jury declined to pursue further charges against Lukens beyond a single charge of "contributing to the delinquency of a minor".

On June 30, 1989, a jury in the Franklin County Juvenile Court convicted Lukens of the misdemeanor crimes of contributing to the delinquency of a minor and contributing to the unruliness of a minor for paying $40 to the girl for sex in his Columbus apartment on November 6, 1988. A friend of the girl's, a 19-year-old, accompanied her that day, but was not directly involved. The judge set aside the conviction on the first charge but upheld the second, for which Lukens received the maximum penalty, 180 days in jail and a fine of $1,000. The judge suspended all but 30 days in jail and half the fine, and ordered Lukens to attend sex offender programs and be tested for venereal diseases. Bond was set at $100,000, which the judge declared "eminently reasonable for a man with no remorse whatsoever."

Though Ohio's age of consent is 16, Lukens' conviction was under a misdemeanor statute that states that "no person shall... aid, abet, induce, cause, encourage, or contribute to a child or ward of the juvenile court (into) becoming an unruly or (delinquent) child."

Lukens made an unsuccessful appeal to the Franklin County Court of Appeals. Of particular contention was that the girl had a considerable juvenile delinquency record (which included curfew violations, running away, and petty theft), but this record (as well as a psychiatric report) was ruled inadmissible. She lived with her mother, but was a ward of the Juvenile Court. Lukens' defense was that the juvenile record would show that the girl was already a delinquent and not a reliable witness. The reliability of her testimony was already under attack, as there were significant testimony inconsistencies, a fact conceded by County Prosecutor Michael Miller.

Refusing to resign from his seat despite the demands of the Republican leadership, Lukens lost the 1990 Republican primary—the real contest in this heavily Republican district—to state representative John Boehner, who would later become Speaker of the United States House of Representatives.

On October 23, 1990, the House Ethics Committee voted to investigate charges that Lukens had fondled and propositioned a Capitol elevator operator. Realizing his position was untenable, Lukens resigned from Congress on October 24, 1990. In January 1991 he served nine days of the 30-day jail sentence handed down in 1989.

Dan Quayle, who was the incumbent Vice President at the time Lukens' sex scandal was unfolding, was ridiculed in the press for conflating Lukens with astronaut Buzz Aldrin. During a speech on July 15, 1989, the gaffe-prone Quayle stated, "This next Thursday, July 20th...America celebrates the 20th anniversary of Neil Armstrong and Buz Lukens walking on the moon."

== House banking scandal ==
In 1995, the task force investigating the House banking scandal charged him with five counts of bribery and conspiracy related to actions he took while in Congress. He was accused of accepting a bribe of $15,000. He was convicted in March 1996 after a second trial, and sentenced to 30 months in prison.

== Personal life ==
Lukens married Toshiko Shirley Jane Davis, a model 21 years his junior, in Columbus, Ohio in June 1973. They divorced in 1983.

== Death ==
Lukens died of cancer in Dallas, Texas in 2010 at the age of 79.

== See also ==
- List of American federal politicians convicted of crimes
- List of federal political scandals in the United States
- List of federal political sex scandals in the United States

Party political offices
| Preceded by Roger Tracy | Republican nominee for Ohio State Auditor; 1978 | Succeeded by Vincent C. Campanella |
U.S. House of Representatives
| New constituency | Member of the U.S. House of Representatives from Ohio's 24th congressional district 1967–1971 | Succeeded by Walter E. Powell |
| Preceded by Tom Kindness | Member of the U.S. House of Representatives from Ohio's 8th congressional district 1987–1990 | Succeeded by John Boehner |
