= Grant E. Mouser Jr. =

American politician

Grant Earl Mouser Jr.
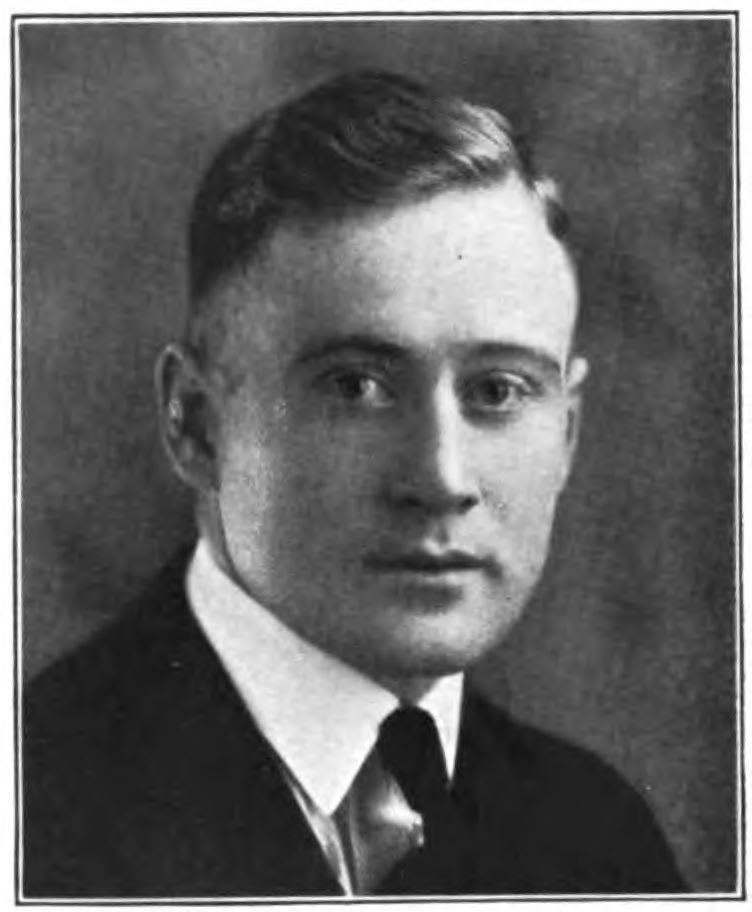
- circa 1921

Member of the U.S. House of Representatives from Ohio's 8th district
- In office March 4, 1929 – March 3, 1933
- Preceded by: Thomas B. Fletcher
- Succeeded by: Thomas B. Fletcher

Personal details
- Born: Grant Earl Mouser Jr. February 20, 1895 Marion, Ohio
- Died: December 21, 1943 (aged 48) Marion, Ohio
- Resting place: Marion Cemetery
- Party: Republican
- Spouse: Hilda Gorham
- Education: Ohio Wesleyan University; Ohio State University College of Law

Grant Earl Mouser Jr. (February 20, 1895 – December 21, 1943) was a U.S. representative from Ohio for two terms from 1929 to 1933.

He was the son of Grant E. Mouser, who also served as a United States congressman from Ohio.

== Biography ==
Born in Marion, Ohio, Mouser attended public schools and Ohio Wesleyan University at Delaware in 1913 and 1914. He graduated from the law college of Ohio State University at Columbus in 1917 and was admitted to the bar the same year. During the First World War, he graduated from the Army Medical School at Washington, D.C., in 1918, and served in the United States Army as a second lieutenant in the Medical Corps with the Western Reserve University College Ambulance Unit. He commenced the practice of law in Marion, Ohio, in 1920, and was City Solicitor of Marion from 1924 to 1927, resigning to become special counsel in the office of the Ohio Attorney General, serving in this capacity until 1929. He also served as attorney for the State highway department in 1927 and 1928.

=== Congress ===
Mouser was elected as a Republican to the Seventy-first and Seventy-second Congresses (March 4, 1929 – March 3, 1933). He was an unsuccessful candidate for re-election in 1932 to the Seventy-third Congress and for election in 1936 to the Seventy-fifth Congress.

=== Later career and family life ===
He continued the practice of law until his death in Marion, Ohio on December 21, 1943. He was interred in Marion Cemetery.

Mouser Jr. married Hilda Gorham in Marion, Ohio, on November 7, 1918.

Mouser Jr. was a Mason, Elk, and member of Methodist Episcopal Church, American Legion, Phi Gamma Delta and Phi Delta Phi.

== Sources ==
- United States Congress. "Grant E. Mouser Jr. (id: M001049)". Biographical Directory of the United States Congress.

U.S. House of Representatives
Preceded by Thomas B. Fletcher	Member of the U.S. House of Representatives from Ohio's 8th congressional district 1929–1933	Succeeded by Thomas B. Fletcher
