= National Register of Historic Places listings in Ross County, Ohio =

Location of Ross County in Ohio

This is a list of the National Register of Historic Places listings in Ross County, Ohio.

This is intended to be a complete list of the properties and districts on the National Register of Historic Places in Ross County, Ohio, United States. The locations of National Register properties and districts for which the latitude and longitude coordinates are included below, may be seen in an online map.

There are 45 properties and districts listed on the National Register in the county, including 2 National Historic Landmarks. Another property was once listed but has been removed.

This National Park Service list is complete through NPS recent listings posted September 26, 2025.

== Current listings ==
	Name on the Register	Image	Date listed	Location	City or town	Description
1	Adena (Thomas Worthington House)	Adena (Thomas Worthington House)	November 10, 1970 (#70000515)	Box 831 Adena Rd. 39°21′13″N 83°00′55″W	Chillicothe	
2	Adena Mound	Adena Mound	June 5, 1975 (#75001529)	947-999 Orange St. 39°21′20″N 83°00′29″W	Chillicothe	Levelled after excavation
3	Administration Building-United States Industrial Reformatory		June 11, 2021 (#100006638)	15802 OH 104 North; 39°22′09″N 83°00′19″W	Chillicothe vicinity	
4	Levi Anderson House	Levi Anderson House	December 12, 1976 (#76001524)	West of Chillicothe on Anderson Station Rd. 39°21′38″N 83°04′32″W	Union Township	
5	Howard Baum Site (33RO270)		August 14, 1986 (#86001663)	South of Bourneville along Paint Creek; 39°15′53″N 83°09′12″W	Twin Township	
6	Austin Brown Mound	Austin Brown Mound	February 15, 1974 (#74001613)	Near Brown Chapel, northwest of Chillicothe; 39°28′56″N 83°05′53″W	Deerfield Township	
7	Buchwalter House-Applethorpe Farm	Buchwalter House-Applethorpe Farm	May 26, 1983 (#83002053)	292 Whissler Rd., north of Hallsville; 39°27′10″N 82°49′14″W	Colerain Township	
8	T.C. Campbell Mound	T.C. Campbell Mound	July 15, 1974 (#74001610)	1 mile (1.6 km) southwest of Bainbridge; 39°13′26″N 83°16′55″W	Paxton Township	Last surviving component of the Trefoil Works; also known as the "Rockhold Mound"
9	Canal Warehouse	Canal Warehouse	April 24, 1973 (#73001522)	Main and Mulberry Sts. 39°20′03″N 82°58′44″W	Chillicothe	
10	Cedar-Bank Works	Cedar-Bank Works	February 15, 1974 (#74001614)	Eastern bank of the Scioto River, north of Chillicothe; 39°24′04″N 82°58′36″W	Green Township	
11	Chillicothe Business District	Chillicothe Business District	June 11, 1979 (#79001931)	Roughly bounded by Water, 4th, Walnut and Hickory Sts. 39°20′03″N 82°58′56″W	Chillicothe	
12	Chillicothe Veterans Administration Hospital	Chillicothe Veterans Administration Hospital	March 12, 2012 (#12000110)	17273 State Route 104, north of Chillicothe; 39°23′19″N 83°01′07″W	Union Township	
13	Chillicothe Water and Power Company Pumping Station	Chillicothe Water and Power Company Pumping Station	November 15, 1979 (#79001932)	Enderlin Circle; 39°20′22″N 82°58′55″W	Chillicothe	
14	Chillicothe's Old Residential District	Chillicothe's Old Residential District	November 28, 1973 (#73001523)	Roughly bounded by 4th, S. Mulberry, S. Walnut and 7th Sts. 39°19′43″N 82°59′04″W	Chillicothe	
15	Elmdale Grange Hall 2162 and Watson One-Room School		August 26, 2024 (#100010717)	3020 Dry Run Road; 39°22′09″N 82°53′25″W	Chillicothe	
16	Frankfort Works Mound	Frankfort Works Mound	May 17, 1973 (#73001530)	Western side of Frankfort; 39°24′17″N 83°11′14″W	Frankfort	
17	Gartner Mound and Village Site	Gartner Mound and Village Site	July 27, 2005 (#05000752)	Along the Scioto River, 6 miles (9.7 km) north of Chillicothe; 39°24′46″N 82°59′00″W	Green Township	
18	Grandview Cemetery	Grandview Cemetery	December 19, 1978 (#78002180)	240 S. Walnut St. 39°19′28″N 82°59′10″W	Chillicothe	
19	Great Seal Park Archeological District	Great Seal Park Archeological District	December 2, 1974 (#74001615)	In Great Seal State Park, 3 miles (4.8 km) from Chillicothe; 39°22′N 82°56′W	Springfield Township	
20	Dr. John Harris Dental School	Dr. John Harris Dental School	July 23, 1973 (#73001521)	Main St. 39°13′38″N 83°16′21″W	Bainbridge	
21	Higby House	Higby House	November 29, 1979 (#79001933)	South of Chillicothe on Three Locks Rd. 39°11′50″N 82°51′58″W	Franklin Township	
22	High Banks Works	High Banks Works	July 16, 1973 (#73001524)	Eastern bank of the Scioto River, southeast of Chillicothe; 39°17′48″N 82°55′03″W	Liberty Township	
23	Highbank Farm	Highbank Farm	October 20, 1980 (#80003215)	Southeast of Chillicothe at 28532 Old U.S. Route 35; 39°16′15″N 82°53′49″W	Liberty Township	
24	Hopeton Earthworks	Hopeton Earthworks	October 15, 1966 (#66000623)	On a terrace of the Scioto River at Hopetown, 1 mile (1.6 km) east of the main Mound City group 39°23′11″N 82°58′45″W	Springfield Township	
25	Hopewell Mound Group	Hopewell Mound Group	February 12, 1974 (#74001616)	Northern bank of the North Fork of Paint Creek; 39°21′40″N 83°05′24″W	Union Township	
26	Kinzer Mound		January 17, 1974 (#74001617)	Address Restricted	South Salem	
27	Henry Mace House	Henry Mace House	February 12, 1998 (#98000101)	17380 State Route 104, N. 39°23′32″N 83°00′45″W	Union Township	
28	Mary Worthington Macomb House	Mary Worthington Macomb House	April 26, 1976 (#76001525)	490 S. Paint St. 39°19′19″N 82°58′48″W	Chillicothe	
29	McCafferty Run Farmstead	McCafferty Run Farmstead	September 3, 2004 (#04000945)	17114 and 17226 State Route 104; 39°23′25″N 83°00′43″W	Union Township	
30	Charles Metzger Mound		June 18, 1973 (#73001526)	2 miles (3.2 km) southwest of Yellow Bud, on a hilltop above Deer Creek; 39°26′58″N 83°02′16″W	Union Township	
31	Mound City Group National Monument	Mound City Group National Monument	October 15, 1966 (#66000119)	North of Chillicothe; 39°22′33″N 83°00′16″W	Union Township	
32	Mountain House	Mountain House	December 29, 1978 (#78002181)	Highland Ave. 39°19′55″N 82°59′29″W	Chillicothe	
33	Oak Hill	Oak Hill	April 3, 1973 (#73001527)	Dun Rd. 39°19′35″N 83°01′28″W	Scioto Township	
34	Renick House, Paint Hill	Renick House, Paint Hill	May 9, 1973 (#73001528)	17 Mead Dr. 39°19′24″N 82°59′26″W	Chillicothe	
35	Seip Earthworks and Dill Mounds District	Seip Earthworks and Dill Mounds District	August 13, 1974 (#74001611)	Southern side of U.S. Route 50, 3 miles (4.8 km) east of Bainbridge; 39°14′16″N 83°13′13″W	Paxton Township	
36	Seip House	Seip House	May 12, 1981 (#81000450)	345 Allen Ave. 39°20′30″N 82°59′37″W	Chillicothe	
37	South Salem Academy	South Salem Academy	February 23, 1979 (#79001937)	Church St. 39°20′10″N 83°18′38″W	South Salem	
38	South Salem Covered Bridge	South Salem Covered Bridge	March 4, 1975 (#75001530)	West of South Salem on Lower Twin Rd. across Buckskin Creek; 39°20′03″N 83°18′52″W	Buckskin Township	
39	Spruce Hill Works	Spruce Hill Works	February 23, 1972 (#72001039)	On a hill overlooking Bourneville; 39°16′33″N 83°08′15″W	Twin Township	
40	David Stitt Mound		November 9, 1972 (#72001040)	Address Restricted	Chillicothe	
41	Story Mound State Memorial	Story Mound State Memorial	March 7, 1973 (#73001529)	East of the junction of Cherokee and Delano Streets; 39°20′31″N 82°59′58″W	Chillicothe	
42	Tanglewood	Tanglewood	June 20, 1979 (#79001934)	177 Belleview Ave. 39°19′39″N 82°59′19″W	Chillicothe	
43	Vanmeter Church Street House	Vanmeter Church Street House	February 21, 1979 (#79001935)	178 Church St. 39°20′10″N 82°59′29″W	Chillicothe	
44	Anthony and Susan Cardinal Walke House	Anthony and Susan Cardinal Walke House	February 21, 2007 (#07000065)	381 Western Ave. 39°20′06″N 82°59′55″W	Chillicothe	
45	Wesley Chapel	Wesley Chapel	February 2, 1979 (#79001936)	Off U.S. Route 23 at Hopetown; 39°22′40″N 82°58′22″W	Springfield Township	

== Former listing ==
	Name on the Register	Image	Date listed	Date removed	Location	City or town	Description
1	Kendrick-Barrett House	Kendrick-Barrett House	March 14, 1973 (#73001525)	November 25, 1977	475 Western Ave. 39°20′03″N 83°00′09″W	Springfield Township	Demolished on November 25, 1977.

== See also ==
- List of National Historic Landmarks in Ohio
- Listings in neighboring counties: Fayette, Highland, Hocking, Jackson, Pickaway, Pike, Vinton
- National Register of Historic Places listings in Ohio
