= Colerain Township, Ohio =

Colerain Township, Ohio, may refer to:

- Colerain Township, Belmont County, Ohio
- Colerain Township, Hamilton County, Ohio
- Colerain Township, Ross County, Ohio
