= Canal warehouse (disambiguation) =

Canal warehouse may refer to:

- Canal warehouse, a commercial building along a canal
- Canal Warehouse (Chillicothe, Ohio), a former warehouse in Chillicothe, Ohio, U.S.

== See also ==
- Black River Canal Warehouse
- Rail and Titsworth Canal Warehouse
