= Yoctangee Park =

Park in Ohio, United States of America

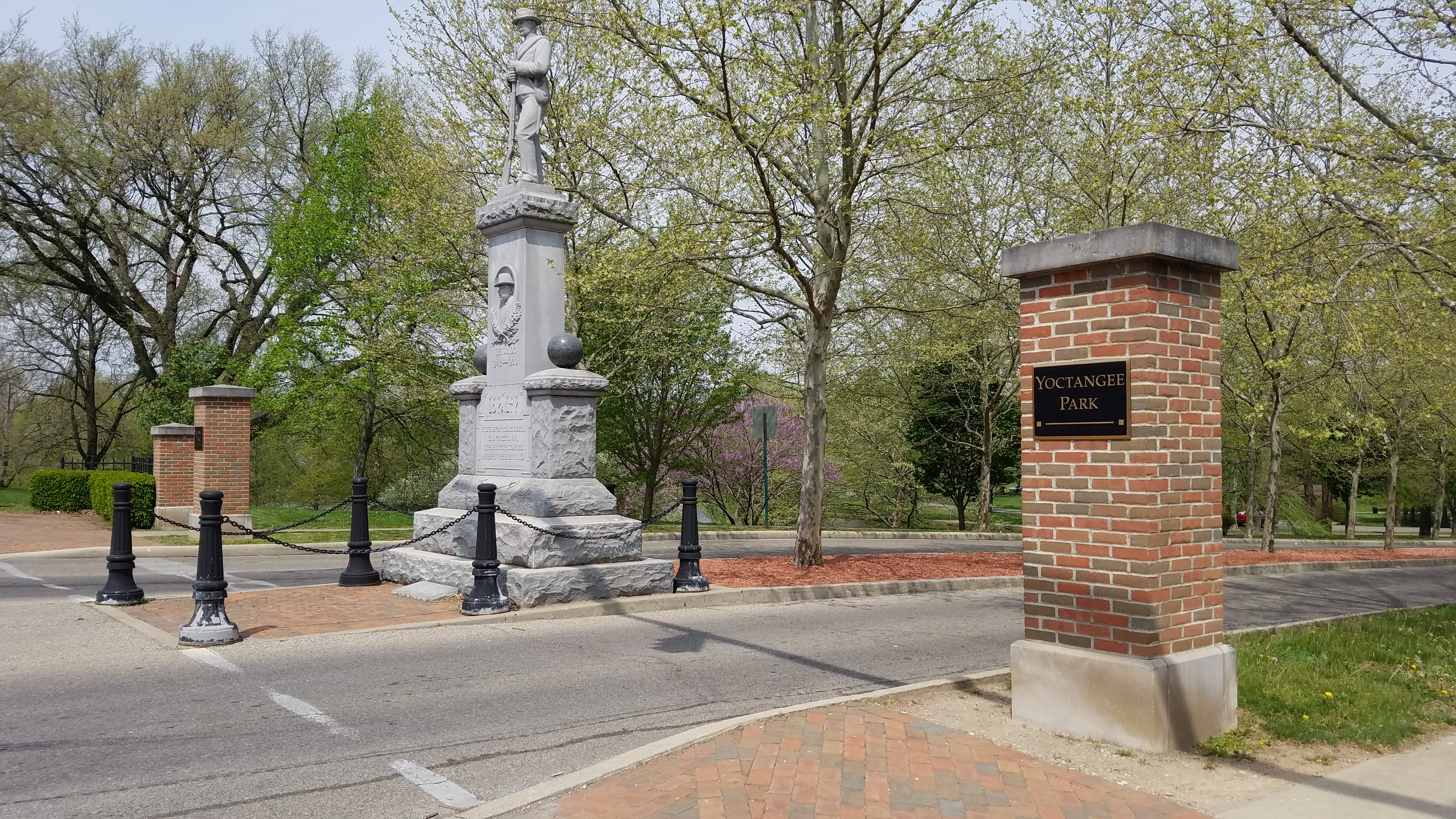
- Interactive map of Yoctangee Park
- Type: Public
- Location: Chillicothe, Ohio
- Coordinates: 39°20′22″N 82°59′05″W

Yoctangee Park is a public park in Chillicothe, Ohio, adjacent to the Historic First Capital District. City Park was the official name of the park from its establishment in 1875 until it was changed to Yoctangee Park sometime in the 1890s by William H. Hunter.

The name Yoctangee is a Native American word for "paint", a reference to the skin and clothing pigments of the culture native to the area.

== History ==
The park was once known as the "Old Bed" of the river, or the "Island", because the old Marietta and Cincinnati Railroad (now the Baltimore and Ohio) built an embankment to redirect the Scioto River, leaving a marshy river bed with an island left in the center where the river once flowed through the park. For twenty years afterwards Chillicotheans attributed the chills and fever and the shaking ague to the overgrowth in the park, and every epidemic of malaria was attributed to the area, considered a plague spot.

The "Old Bed" is a part of the original Ebenezer Zane Section. This man of history is the one who blazed the trail from Wheeling to Maysville, at the beginning of the nineteenth century, under a contract with the Government, that for his services in laying out the large highway, he was to receive, at the crossing of every navigable stream, a full section of land at Wheeling one near Lancaster, and one down on the Ohio River across from Maysville, he was given a patent right by the United States of America to a plot of ground, on February 14, 1800, and surveyed the required area which ran Northwardly for the South bank of the old Scioto River, between what are now Bridge and Mill Streets, and Northwardly, almost up to Hopetown. Zanesville got its name from Ebenezer Zane, and Zane's Trace and Trail is to become a National Pike.

After the Civil War, Chillicothe's newspapers regularly had communications from citizens and physicians, demanding that the great nuisance of the "Old Bed" had to be abated. There came a demand for the acquirement of this spot by the city, for the purpose of draining and cleaning up this pestilential and poisonous cesspool.

To finance the purchase of the property, Honorable John H. Putnam member of the Ohio Legislature from this city, had a special Act passed, whereby the municipality had a right to levy a tax for the purchase.

It appears that out of the virulence of the miasma and much shaking for ague, grew the demand for a clean-up of the unhealthy zone, and contemporaneously there happened to be an abnormal amount of unemployment, so that when the proposition was put to the Council to eradicate the evil, there were willing hands.

== Historical landmarks ==
The Pump House Center for the Arts occupies the building which was once Chillicothe's pump house and is now part of Yoctangee Park. The 1882 historical brick building offers tours rentals, and free admission.

The Pump House Center for the Arts is housed in the former Pump House of the Chillicothe Water and Sewer Co. The Pump House was constructed in 1883 as a municipal pumping station for distribution of water from the deep well field located in Yoctangee Park to a reservoir situated on Carlisle Hill. In March 1977, the Pump House was placed on the Ohio History Inventory. On November 15, 1979, it was listed in the National Register of Historic Places kept by the U.S. Department of Interior. The Pump House was used by the Jaycees group for its annual Haunted House fund-raiser until it was condemned in 1984 as unsafe. A group of artists, preservationists, and an attorney formed a coalition to restore and preserve the building. In 1986, City Council designated the Pump House as part of the city’s Preservation District. Coursework was replaced, bricks were repaired, floors were poured, electricity and water was installed, and the walls were rebuilt. The rooms were transformed into a beautiful art gallery where works could be displayed. The Pump House is an example of Victorian Gothic architecture, featuring a large central tower, Palladian windows, common-bond brick, and a low-pitched, hipped slate roof.

The city owns the former National Guard armory in what is now Yoctangee Park. The building was originally built in the early 20th century. Council has yet to decide what to do with the armory and has mothballed it. There have been a few ideas suggested for the building, such as a military museum or an orangerie, but due to lack of funding nothing has moved forward.

Two historic B&O Railroad caboose cars are on display in Yoctangee Park bordering Water Street. The cars were restored by volunteers who have collected railroad memorabilia and put items on display in the cars. Tours are given on weekdays starting in spring until early fall.

== Geography and facilities ==
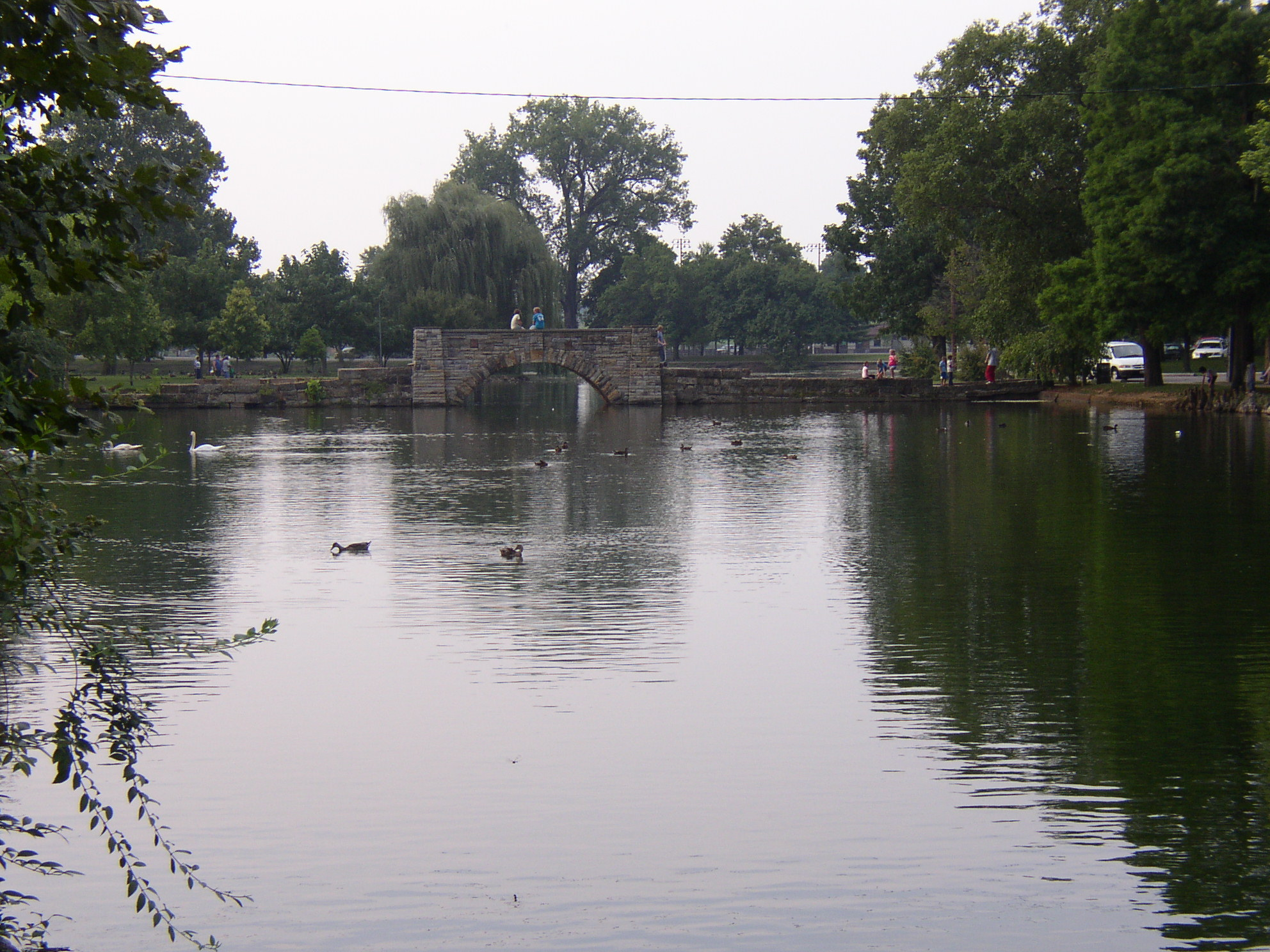
This stone arch bridge crossing Yoctangee Lake is a noteworthy landmark in Chillicothe.

=== Geography ===
Yoctangee Park Lake is a 12-acre (49,000 m^{2}) lake contained within Yoctangee Park. Canoeing is sometimes available on the lake during festivals or by reservation.

=== Facilities ===
Swimming pool, six tennis courts, basketball and volleyball courts, baseball/softball diamonds, picnicking facilities, playground, shelter houses, grandstand, restrooms.

== Park annex ==
An annex to the original Yoctangee Park area provides 40+ acres of soccer and baseball/softball fields to the north, and a boat access to the river on the south end. The Chillicothe Youth Soccer League (CYSL) and YMCA provide youth soccer leagues in this area.

== Events ==
=== Hoverally ===
Hoverclub of America sponsors an annual hovercraft race is held in the Yoctangee Park Annex, spanning a section of park land and circling a small island area in the Scioto River. It is even claimed to be the largest hovercraft event in the world 1. It unfortunately was cancelled in 2009.

=== Feast of the Flowering Moon ===
This is a three-day event held in late May. The festival is held in Yoctangee Park, and most years also along Water St. between Mulberry and Walnut streets, and Paint St. from the Park to US-50. It typically features Native American Music, Dancing, Food, Arts & Crafts, Story Telling, Educational Demonstrations and much more. Special Guests have included: Douglas Blue Feather, 2002 & 2003 NAMMY Winner. Joseph FireCorw, 2003 NAMMY Winner. Native Violinist Arvel Bird of Singing Wolf Records.

Also see the Chillicothe, Ohio article on this topic.

=== Farmer's Fall Festival ===
The Farmer's Fall Festival, or Fall Harvest Festival is often held the first weekend in October. The festival has entertainment, crafts, flea market and more.

=== Concerts ===
The Columbus Symphony Orchestra performs a free concert annually in Yoctangee Park. Various passing bands perform concerts in the park from time to time as well.

== Bicentennial renovations ==
The entrance to Yoctangee Park was partially completed in 2003 and completed in 2004 at a total cost of $286,000.

A 2-acre (8,100 m^{2}) part just north of the Water Shop on Yoctangee Blvd. is dedicated as a Veterans Memorial Park honoring all World War II veterans.

== Bibliography ==
Allen, Gertrude C. "History of the City Parks of Chillicothe, Ohio." The Chillicothe Parks and Recreation Office.
