= Salt Creek Township, Pickaway County, Ohio =

Township in Ohio, US

- Township
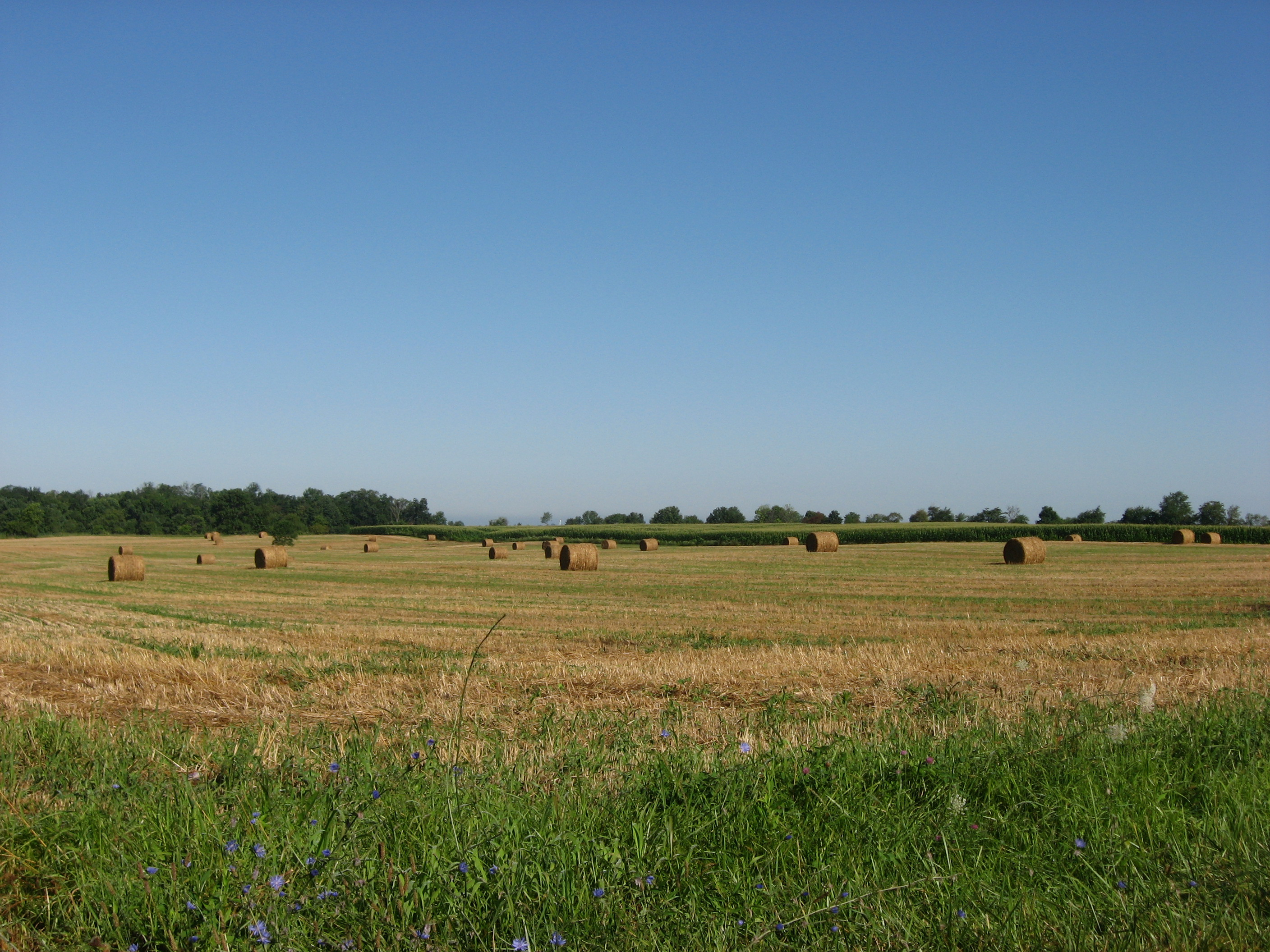
- A field in Salt Creek Township

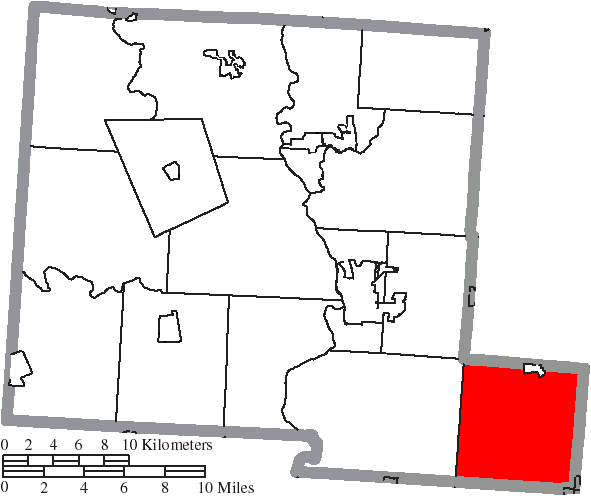
- Location of Salt Creek Township in Pickaway County
- Coordinates: 39°31′15″N 82°46′52″W
- Country: United States
- State: Ohio
- County: Pickaway

Area
  - Total: 35.9 sq mi (93.0 km^{2})
  - Land: 35.9 sq mi (93.0 km^{2})
  - Water: 0 sq mi (0.0 km^{2})
- Elevation: 840 ft (256 m)

Population (2020)
  - Total: 2,727
  - Density: 75.9/sq mi (29.3/km^{2})
- Time zone: UTC-5 (Eastern (EST))
  - Summer (DST): UTC-4 (EDT)
- FIPS code: 39-70184
- GNIS feature ID: 1086802

Salt Creek Township is one of the fifteen townships of Pickaway County, Ohio, United States. The 2020 census found 2,727 people in the township.

== Geography ==
Located in the southeastern corner of the county, it borders the following townships:

- Clearcreek Township, Fairfield County - north
- Perry Township, Hocking County - east
- Salt Creek Township, Hocking County - southeast corner
- Colerain Township, Ross County - south
- Green Township, Ross County - southwest corner
- Pickaway Township - west
- Washington Township - northwest corner

The farthest east township in Pickaway County, it is the only county township to border Hocking County.

The village of Tarlton is located in northern Salt Creek Township.

== Name and history ==
It is one of five Salt Creek Townships statewide.

== Government ==
The township is governed by a three-member board of trustees, who are elected in November of odd-numbered years to a four-year term beginning on the following January 1. Two are elected in the year after the presidential election and one is elected in the year before it. There is also an elected township fiscal officer, who serves a four-year term beginning on April 1 of the year after the election, which is held in November of the year before the presidential election. Vacancies in the fiscal officership or on the board of trustees are filled by the remaining trustees.
