= Scioto Township, Ross County, Ohio =

Township in Ohio, US

- Township
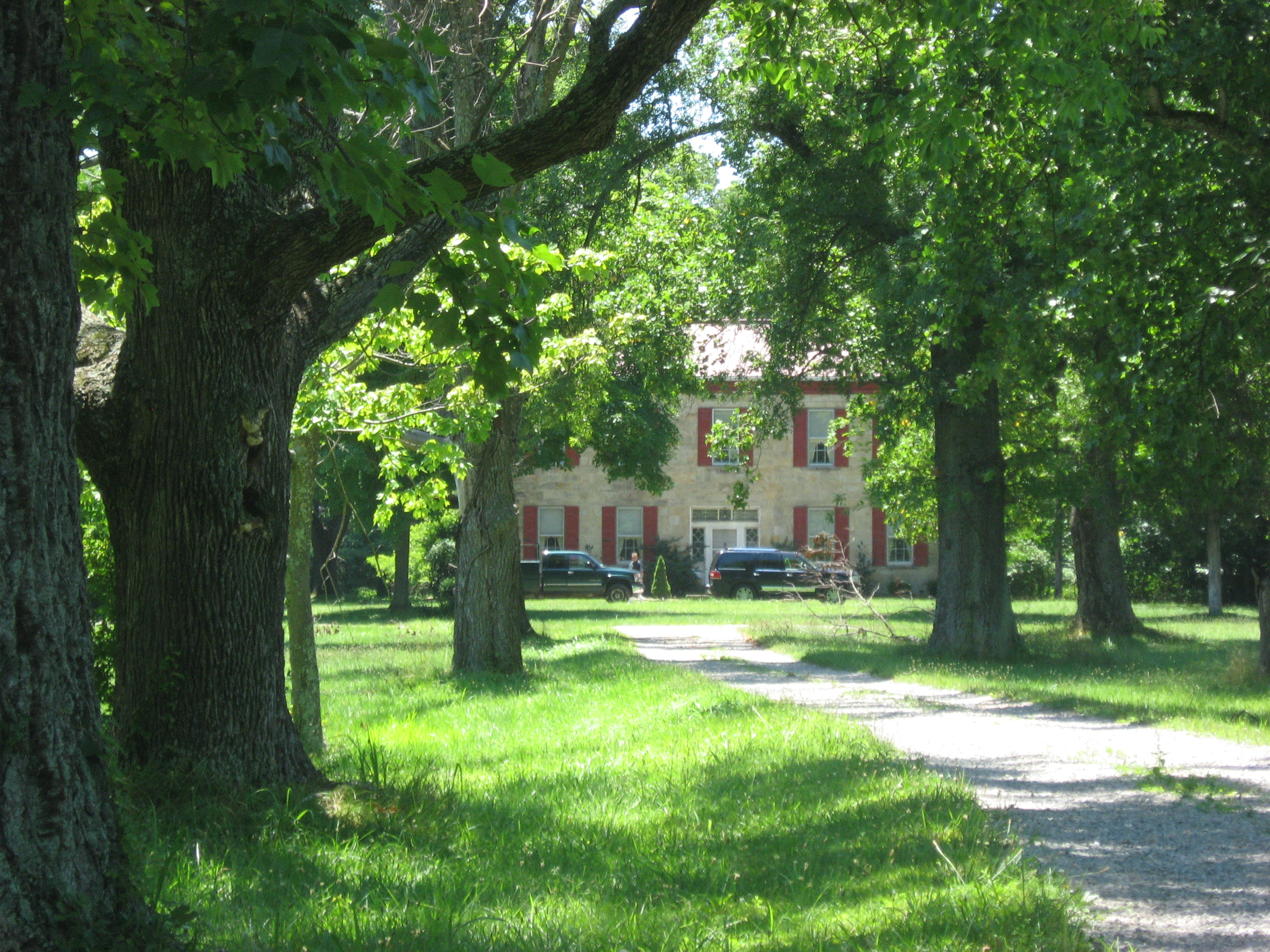
- Oak Hill, built 1840

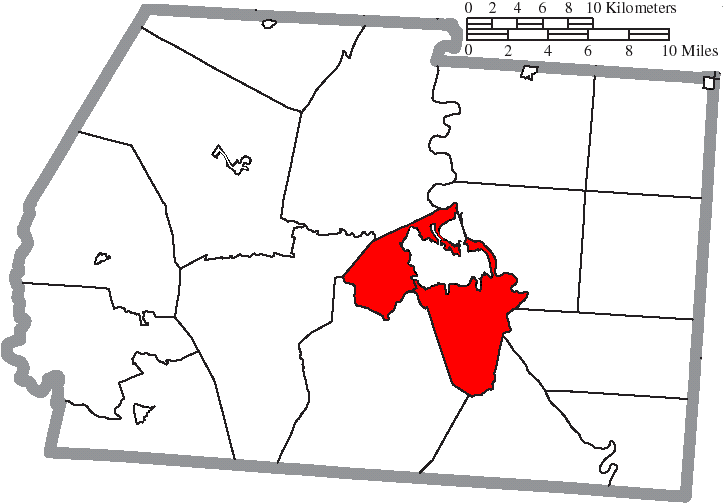
- Location of Scioto Township in Ross County
- Coordinates: 39°19′51″N 82°58′58″W
- Country: United States
- State: Ohio
- County: Ross

Area
  - Total: 41.0 sq mi (106.1 km^{2})
  - Land: 39.5 sq mi (102.4 km^{2})
  - Water: 1.4 sq mi (3.6 km^{2})
- Elevation: 715 ft (218 m)

Population (2020)
  - Total: 27,876
  - Density: 705/sq mi (272.2/km^{2})
- Time zone: UTC-5 (Eastern (EST))
  - Summer (DST): UTC-4 (EDT)
- FIPS code: 39-70898
- GNIS feature ID: 1086903

Scioto Township is one of the sixteen townships of Ross County, Ohio, United States. The 2020 census found 27,876 people in the township.

== Geography ==
Located in the central part of the county, it borders the following townships:

- Springfield Township - northeast
- Liberty Township - southeast
- Franklin Township - south
- Huntington Township - southwest
- Twin Township - west
- Union Township - northwest

Much of central Scioto Township is occupied by the city of Chillicothe, the county seat of Ross County, while some of the area that remains is occupied by the census-designated place of North Fork Village.

== Name and history ==
It is one of five Scioto Townships statewide.

== Government ==
The township is governed by a three-member board of trustees, who are elected in November of odd-numbered years to a four-year term beginning on the following January 1. Two are elected in the year after the presidential election and one is elected in the year before it. There is also an elected township fiscal officer, who serves a four-year term beginning on April 1 of the year after the election, which is held in November of the year before the presidential election. Vacancies in the fiscal officership or on the board of trustees are filled by the remaining trustees.

Chillicothe Correctional Institution of the Ohio Department of Rehabilitation and Correction is in Scioto Township.
