= Pickaway Township, Pickaway County, Ohio =

Township in Ohio, US

- Township
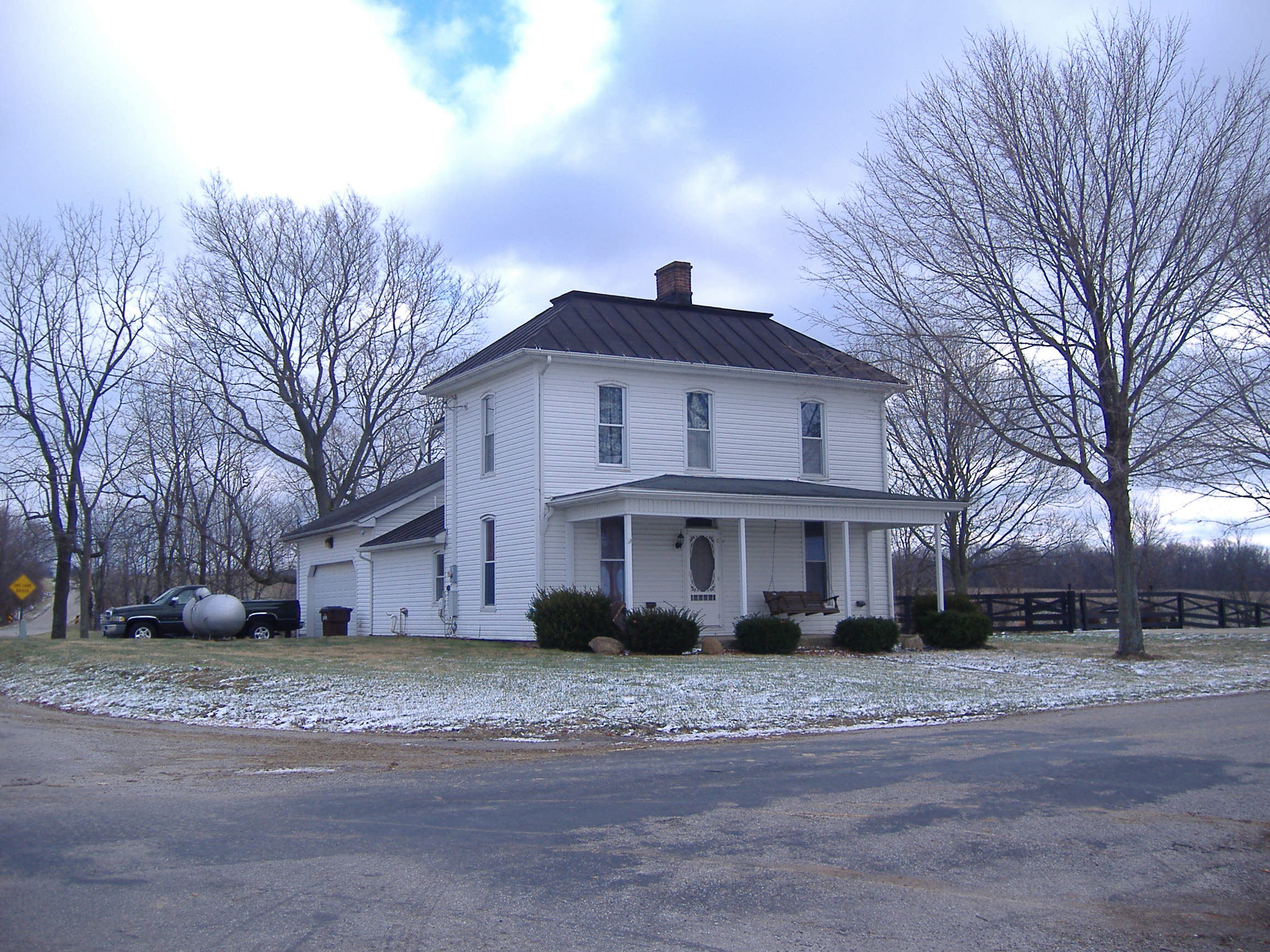
- The Joseph Black Farmhouse, a historic site in the township

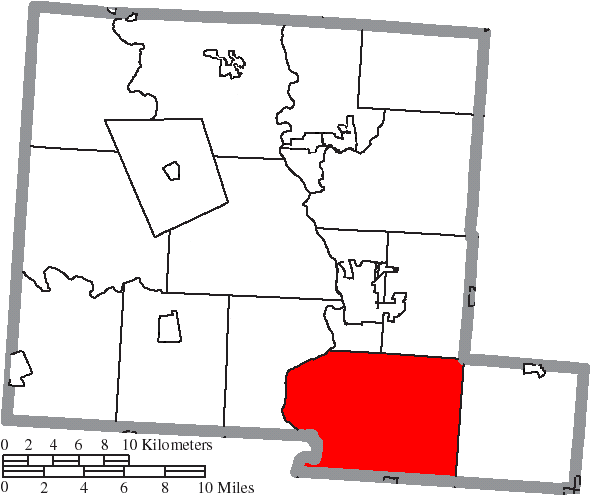
- Location of Pickaway Township in Pickaway County
- Coordinates: 39°31′33″N 82°55′13″W
- Country: United States
- State: Ohio
- County: Pickaway

Area
  - Total: 49.0 sq mi (126.9 km^{2})
  - Land: 48.6 sq mi (126.0 km^{2})
  - Water: 0.35 sq mi (0.9 km^{2})
- Elevation: 764 ft (233 m)

Population (2020)
  - Total: 2,036
  - Density: 42/sq mi (16.1/km^{2})
- Time zone: UTC-5 (Eastern (EST))
  - Summer (DST): UTC-4 (EDT)
- FIPS code: 39-62484
- GNIS feature ID: 1086801

Pickaway Township is one of the fifteen townships of Pickaway County, Ohio, United States. The 2020 census found 2,036 people in the township.

== Geography ==
Located in the southeastern part of the county, it borders the following townships:

- Circleville Township - north, west of Washington Township
- Washington Township - north, east of Circleville Township
- Clearcreek Township, Fairfield County - northeast corner
- Salt Creek Township - east
- Colerain Township, Ross County - southeast corner
- Green Township, Ross County - south
- Union Township, Ross County - southwest
- Wayne Township - northwest

No municipalities are located in Pickaway Township.

== Name and history ==
It is the only Pickaway Township statewide.

== Government ==
The township is governed by a three-member board of trustees, who are elected in November of odd-numbered years to a four-year term beginning on the following January 1. Two are elected in the year after the presidential election and one is elected in the year before it. There is also an elected township fiscal officer, who serves a four-year term beginning on April 1 of the year after the election, which is held in November of the year before the presidential election. Vacancies in the fiscal officership or on the board of trustees are filled by the remaining trustees.
