= Springfield Township, Ross County, Ohio =

Township in Ohio, US

- Township
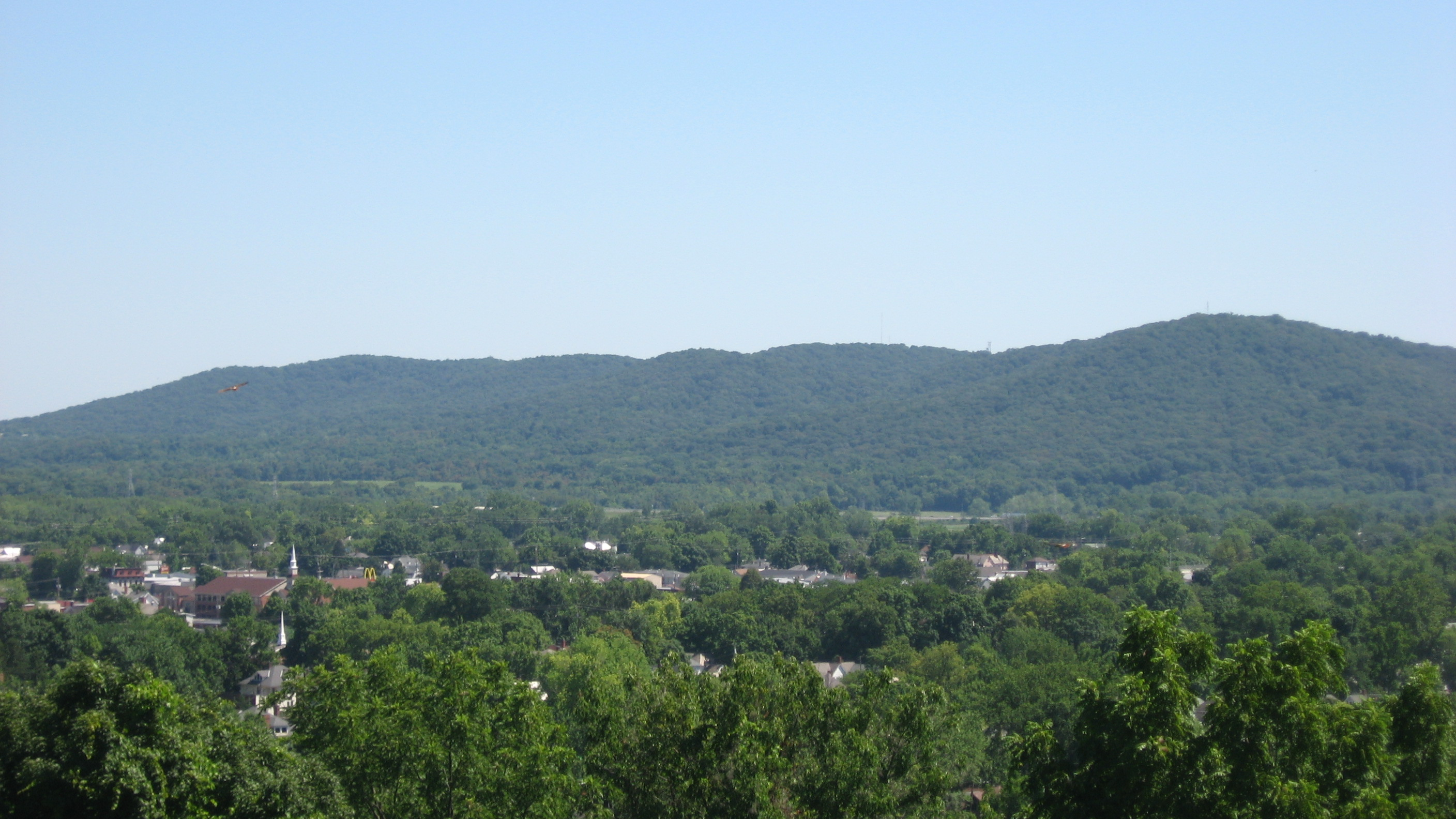
- Hills in Great Seal State Park

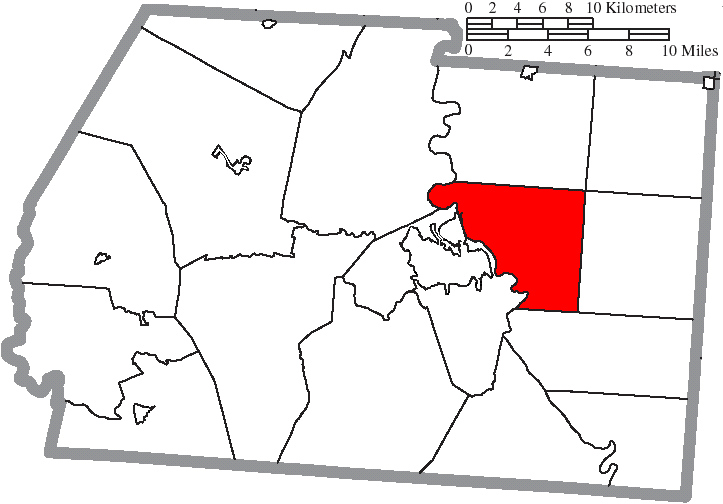
- Location of Springfield Township in Ross County
- Coordinates: 39°20′41″N 82°55′57″W
- Country: United States
- State: Ohio
- County: Ross

Area
  - Total: 30.8 sq mi (79.8 km^{2})
  - Land: 30.4 sq mi (78.7 km^{2})
  - Water: 0.42 sq mi (1.1 km^{2})
- Elevation: 814 ft (248 m)

Population (2020)
  - Total: 2,573
  - Density: 85/sq mi (32.7/km^{2})
- Time zone: UTC-5 (Eastern (EST))
  - Summer (DST): UTC-4 (EDT)
- FIPS code: 39-74129
- GNIS feature ID: 1086904

Springfield Township is one of the sixteen townships of Ross County, Ohio, United States. The 2020 census found 2,573 people in the township.

== Geography ==
Located in the eastern part of the county, it borders the following townships:

- Green Township - north
- Colerain Township - northeast corner
- Harrison Township - east
- Liberty Township - southeast
- Scioto Township - southwest
- Union Township - northwest

No municipalities are located in Springfield Township.

== Name and history ==
It is one of eleven Springfield Townships statewide.

== Government ==
The township is governed by a three-member board of trustees, who are elected in November of odd-numbered years to a four-year term beginning on the following January 1. Two are elected in the year after the presidential election and one is elected in the year before it. There is also an elected township fiscal officer, who serves a four-year term beginning on April 1 of the year after the election, which is held in November of the year before the presidential election. Vacancies in the fiscal officership or on the board of trustees are filled by the remaining trustees.
