= Applethorpe Farm =

Historic house in Ohio, United States

- Buchwalter House-Applethorpe Farm
- U.S. National Register of Historic Places
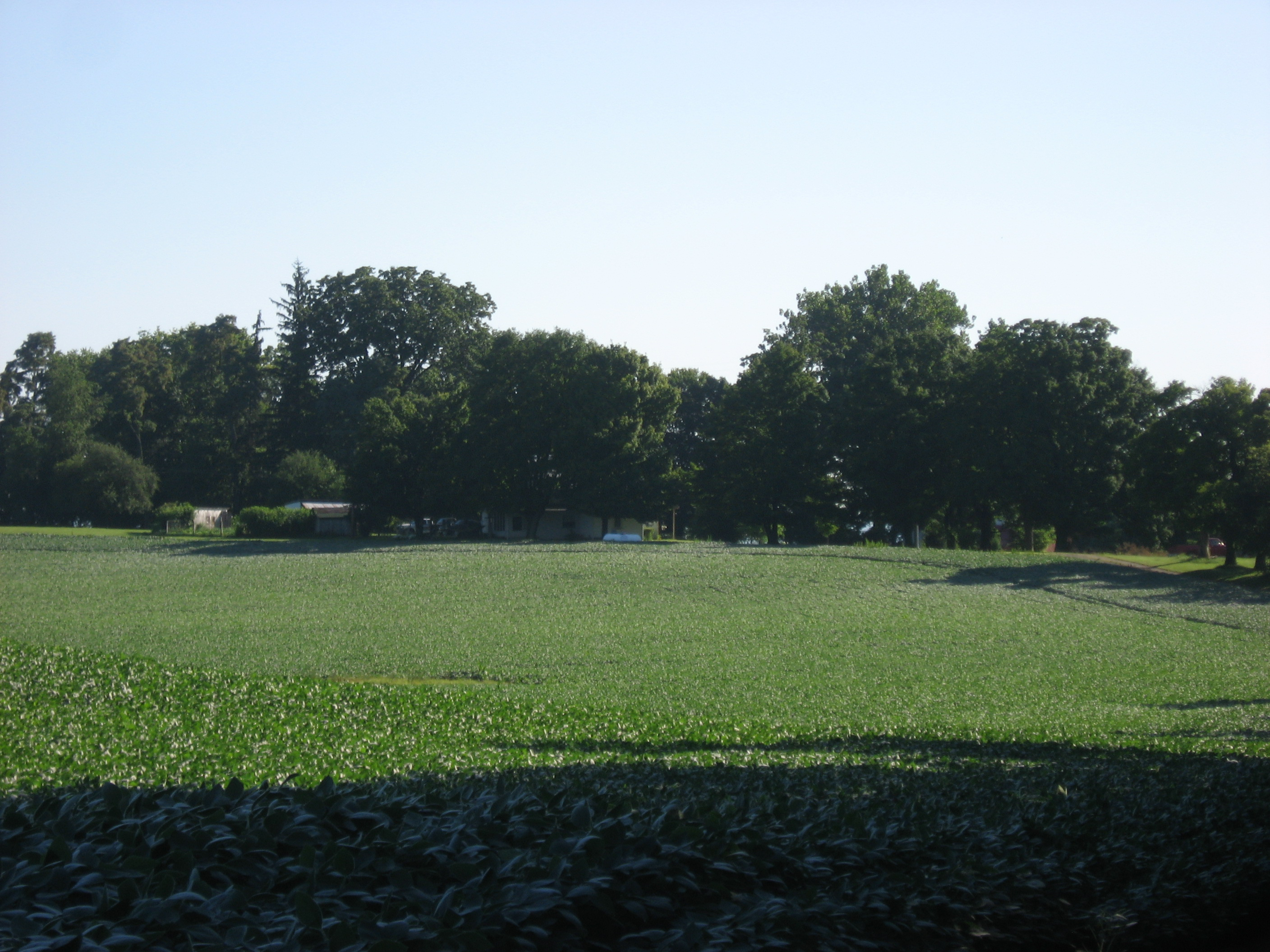
- Driveway view of the farm buildings

- Location within Ohio Location within the United States
- Nearest city: Hallsville, Ohio
- Coordinates: 39°27′10″N 82°49′14″W
- Area: 1 acre (0.40 ha)
- Built: 1840
- Architect: John Jr. Buchwalter
- Architectural style: Greek Revival
- NRHP reference No.: 83002053
- Added to NRHP: May 26, 1983

Applethorpe Farm is a historic farmstead in northeastern Ross County, Ohio, United States. Located along Whissler Road north of the unincorporated community of Hallsville, it was established by the family of John Buchwalter in the early years of the nineteenth century. Among the region's earliest settlers, the Buchwalters erected a large log building soon after taking possession of the property. As the years passed, the farm acquired the name of "Applethorpe" because its grounds included the first apple orchard in Ross County.

By 1840, John Buchwalter, Jr. owned the property; in that year, he decided to construct a new farmhouse. Erecting an elaborate structure in the popular Greek Revival style, he built its two-story walls of brick with sandstone details. The house is generally a very symmetrical structure: the west-facing facade features an entrance in the central of five bays, and twin chimneys rise above each end of the structure. Among its most distinctively Greek Revival elements is the classical portico around the main entrance; it features a triple entablature with square columns, and the doors it shelters are heavy and constructed of multiple large components.

In 1983, the Buchwalter house and the rest of Applethorpe Farm were listed on the National Register of Historic Places. As well as the house, two agricultural outbuildings qualified as contributing properties within the area designated as historic. Key to the farm's recognition was the architecture of the farmhouse, which was seen as an exceptionally well-preserved example of the rural interpretation of the Greek Revival style.
