= Harrison Township, Ross County, Ohio =

Township in Ohio, US

- Township
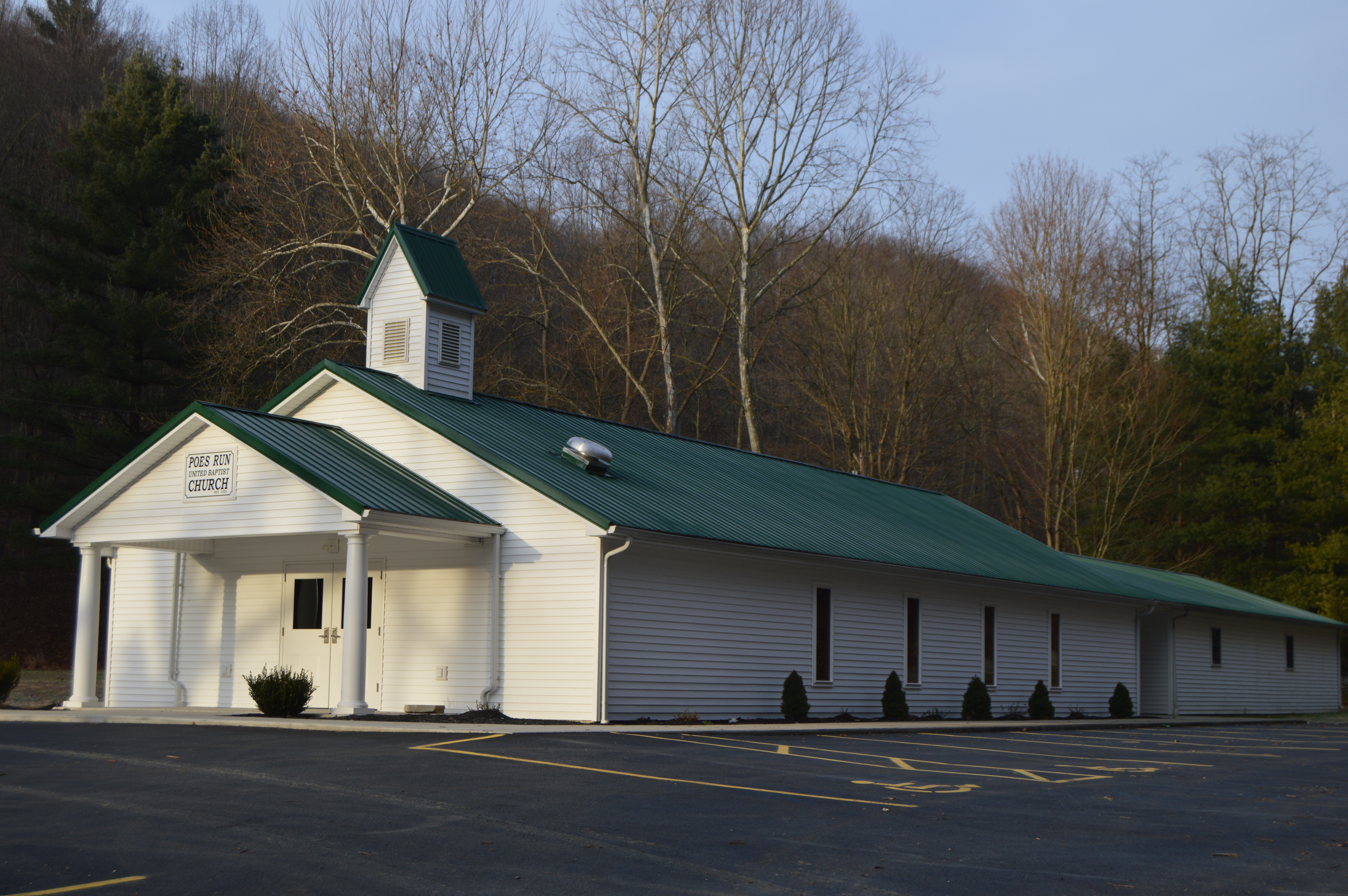
- Poes Run United Baptist Church

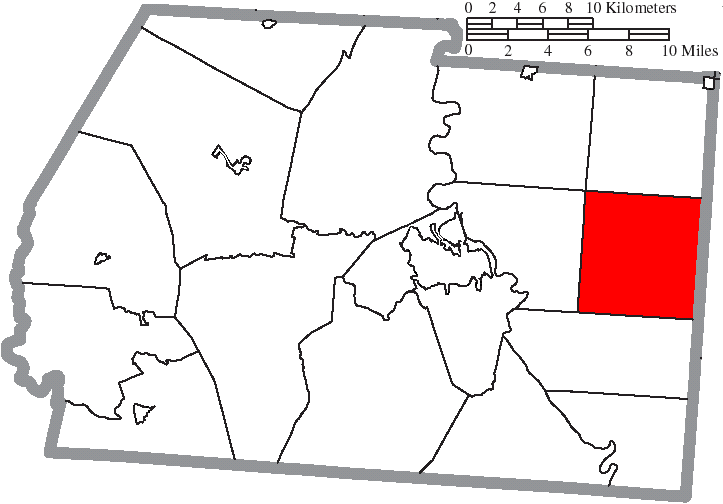
- Location of Harrison Township in Ross County
- Coordinates: 39°20′24″N 82°49′33″W
- Country: United States
- State: Ohio
- County: Ross

Area
  - Total: 36.2 sq mi (93.7 km^{2})
  - Land: 36.2 sq mi (93.7 km^{2})
  - Water: 0 sq mi (0.0 km^{2})
- Elevation: 745 ft (227 m)

Population (2020)
  - Total: 1,189
  - Density: 32.9/sq mi (12.7/km^{2})
- Time zone: UTC-5 (Eastern (EST))
  - Summer (DST): UTC-4 (EDT)
- FIPS code: 39-34006
- GNIS feature ID: 1086897

Harrison Township is one of the sixteen townships of Ross County, Ohio, United States. The 2020 census found 1,189 people in the township.

== Geography ==
Located in the eastern part of the county, it borders the following townships:

- Colerain Township – north
- Salt Creek Township, Hocking County – northeast
- Eagle Township, Vinton County – east
- Liberty Township – south
- Springfield Township – west
- Green Township – northwest corner

No municipalities are located in Harrison Township.

== Name and history ==
It is one of nineteen Harrison Townships statewide.

== Government ==
The township is governed by a three-member board of trustees, who are elected in November of odd-numbered years to a four-year term beginning on the following January 1. Two are elected in the year after the presidential election and one is elected in the year before it. There is also an elected township fiscal officer, who serves a four-year term beginning on April 1 of the year after the election, which is held in November of the year before the presidential election. Vacancies in the fiscal officership or on the board of trustees are filled by the remaining trustees.
