= Levi Anderson House =

Historic house in Ohio, United States

- U.S. National Register of Historic Places
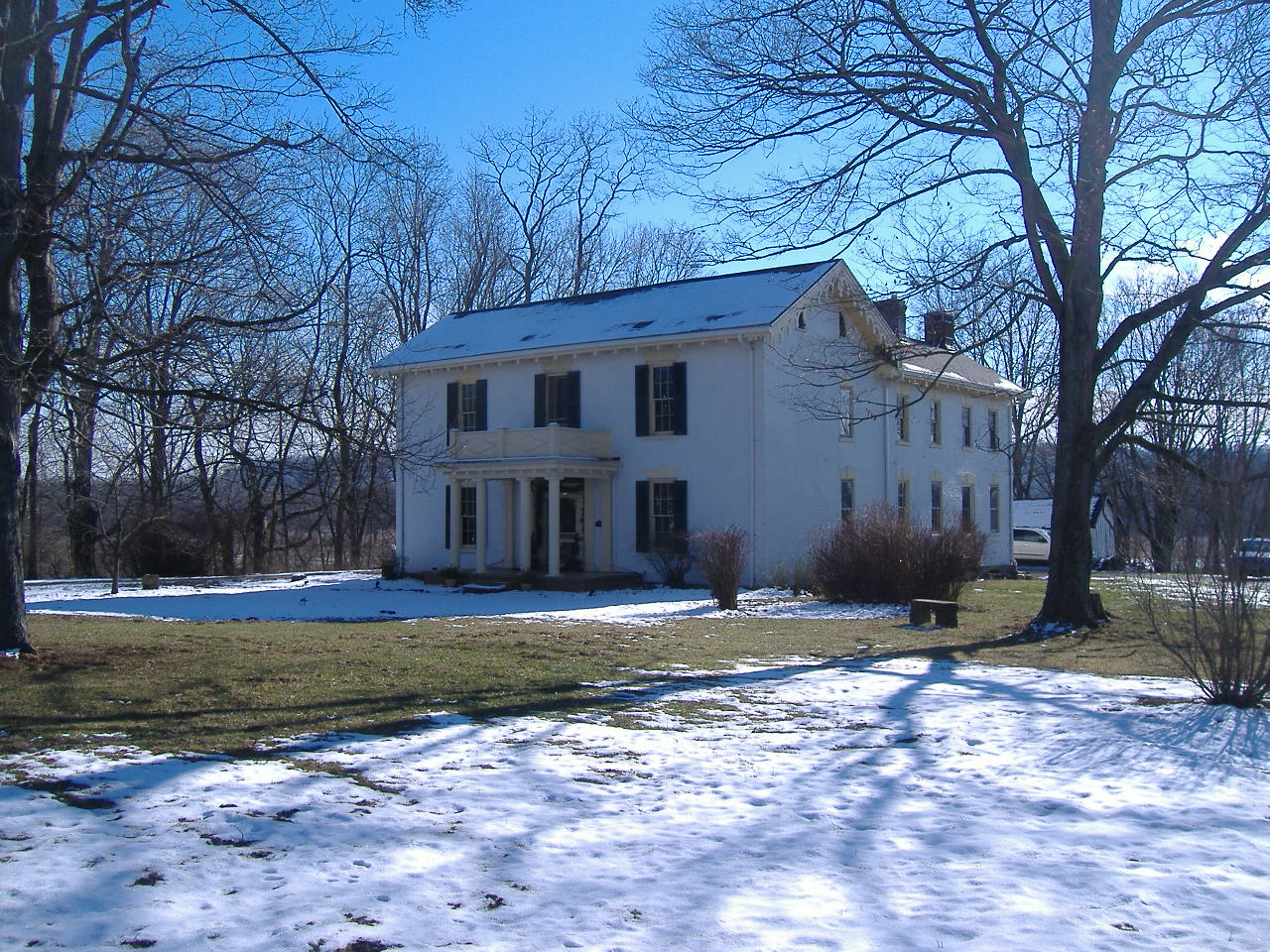
- Front of the house

- Location within Ohio Location within the United States
- Nearest city: Chillicothe, Ohio
- Coordinates: 39°21′38″N 83°4′32″W
- Area: 3 acres (1.2 ha)
- Built: 1826
- Architect: Gershon Anderson
- Architectural style: Greek Revival
- NRHP reference No.: 76001524
- Added to NRHP: December 12, 1976

The Levi Anderson House is a historic house in Union Township, Ross County, Ohio, United States. Located along Anderson Station Road west of the city of Chillicothe, it is a fine example of the Greek Revival farmhouses of early nineteenth-century rural Ross County.

The oldest (rear) part of the house was built in 1826; its first resident appears to have been William Robinson (1764 - 1834), who participated in the first settlement of Ross County in 1795. William was a participant of the last deadly conflict between whites and Native Americans in Ross County while surveying the Indian homeland under the current treaty for future white development with the hope that the Natives would give up their land. The survey party was caught attempting to steal the Natives' horses and the ensuing battle killed William's half-brother Joshua (1769 - 1795) and some of the natives but resulted in the successful theft of all of the Natives' property. (ref. Vol XIX Ohio Archaeological and Historical Publications, Columbus, OH, 1910 "Reminiscences of a Pioneer" by Thomas Rogers, a brother-in-law of Joshua Robinson's son and nephew of Levi Anderson and son of William Rodgers, a member of the survey group, Nov. 1871 edited by Clement L. Martzolff, pages 199 - 200) After a new treaty was made he bought approximately 300 acres (120 ha) of land surrounding the present house and built a log cabin on the property, becoming Union Township's first settler. The property was purchased by Levi Anderson (1790 - 1846) in 1838, who arranged for the expansion of the house and the embellishment of its interior. Responsible for the interior improvements was Levi's brother Gershon Anderson (1780 - 1842); he crafted detailed woodworking, which remains to the present day.

The house itself is a brick structure, covered with weatherboarding; it rests on a foundation of sandstone and is ornamented by elements of wood and stone. Many original elements of the house survive, qualifying it for inclusion on the National Register of Historic Places because of its well-preserved historic architecture. It was added to the Register in late 1976, both because of its architecture and because of its place in local exploration and settlement.
