= Howard Baum Site =

Archaeological site in Ohio, United States

- Baum, Howard, Site (33RO270)
- U.S. National Register of Historic Places
- Nearest city: Bainbridge, Ohio
- Area: 0.1 acres (0.040 ha)
- NRHP reference No.: 86001663
- Added to NRHP: August 14, 1986

Howard Baum Site (also called Clark's Work) is a Hopewell tradition earthworks site located in Ross County, Ohio, in the United States. The work is located near the north fork of Paint Creek. It was described, in 1848, as "one of the largest and most interesting in the Scioto valley."

== History and location ==
The site is located on the north fork of Paint Creek. In the mid-19th century, it was located on the property of W.C. Clark, hence the other name - "Clark's Work". The site dates back to the late Prehistoric period.

== Excavation history ==
=== Visit to the site by Squier and Davis in mid-19th century ===
The site was visited by Ephraim George Squier and Edwin Hamilton Davis in the mid-19th century. They wrote about the site in their 1848 book, Ancient Monuments of the Mississippi Valley. Squier and Davis believed that the site was used as a fortification. Within the main work are multiple smaller works, which they believed were of religious significance. It was described as being shaped like a parallelogram at 2800 feet by 1800 feet, with "corners somewhat rounded."

The creekside section of the work has a wall four feet in height, which runs alongside the bank. An exterior ditch traces the wall, which raises in height to six feet by 35 feet at the base. The ditch that follows matches the dimensions. During their visit, they noted that where the ravine had deepened over time, the ditch had washed away. The site encloses 111 acres of land. Inside of the work are two smaller works: a perfect circle at 350 feet in diameter and a semi-circle that is 2,000 feet in circumference. The semi-circle has seven mounds within it. Three are connected to each other, totaling 30 feet high, 500 feet long, and 180 feet wide.

To the right of the work is a smaller work covering 16 acres. It's a square shape, totaling 850 feet in size. Each side has an entrance in the center of it. Each entrance is 30 feet wide. Each gate has a small mound that accompanies it, and there are two other entrances on two outer corners, without mound accompaniment. There is no ditch around the smaller square work. Additional mounds are located throughout the area. One area of the main fortification was broken down, creating a gully which flowed with water from a nearby spring.

Based on their excavations, the stated that "nearly all mounds examined were places of sacrifice, containing altars,". They also confirmed that the site was also used as a fort. Squier and Davis stated that the amount of labor required to build the works was "immense," and that the embankments total three miles in length with approximately three million cubic feet of soil being used to build it.

=== 20th-century ===
A 1981 paper, Faunal Remains from the Howard Baum Site, Ross County, Ohio, discusses the finding of 1,522 animal remains discovered in the groundmass at the site. The remains found included those of turkey, deer, elk, and other species.
