= Mary Worthington Macomb House =

Historic house in Chillicothe, Ohio, United States

- U.S. National Register of Historic Places
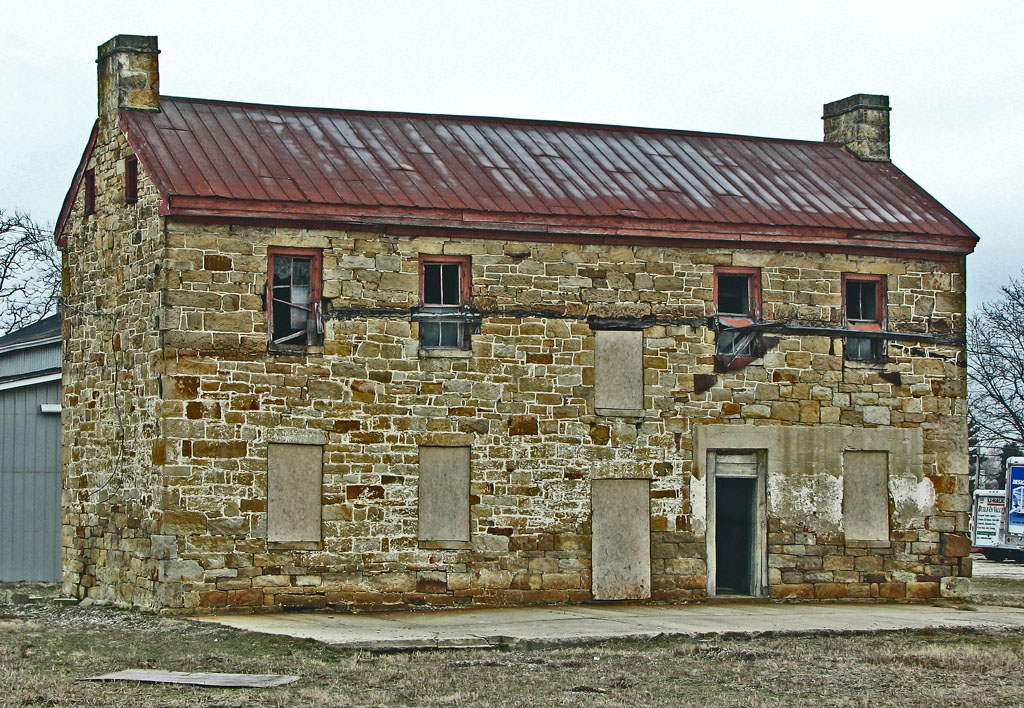
- Front of the house

- Location within Ohio Location within the United States
- Location: 490 S. Paint St., Chillicothe, Ohio
- Coordinates: 39°19′19″N 82°58′48″W
- Area: 1 acre (0.40 ha)
- NRHP reference No.: 76001525
- Added to NRHP: April 26, 1976

The Mary Worthington Macomb House is a historic residence in southern Chillicothe, Ohio, United States. Located on South Paint Street, the house sits on the banks of Paint Creek. One of the oldest buildings still in existence in Chillicothe, the Macomb House sits on a land tract of 35 acres (14 ha) that was originally owned by Nathaniel Massie. A later owner started to build the present house in 1813, and it was completed two years later. In the same year, former U.S. Senator and future Governor Thomas Worthington purchased the property.

The oldest of Governor Worthington's daughters was Mary, who was born in 1797. Although Mary and her family lived in the grand Adena Mansion on Chillicothe's northern side, she chose to marry lower in society circa 1816. Her new husband, David Macomb, was a member of a prominent local family, but his poor management of their property forced them into debt, and they settled in the southern United States, where Mary died while moving to Texas in 1836. Before moving southward, the Macombs resided in the present two-story house, which is built primarily of large blocks of sandstone.

After the Macombs' departure, the property was converted for industrial uses. By 1845, multiple new buildings arose around the old structure, including a frame building and a slaughterhouse. These buildings are no longer on the property. In 1976, the Macomb House was listed on the National Register of Historic Places, qualifying both because of its historically important architecture and because of its place in local history: most significant were its architecture, its role in commerce, and its place in the exploration and settlement of the local area. By the early twenty-first century, the house had deteriorated greatly; with the proposal of an influx of money from the American Recovery and Reinvestment Act of 2009, applications were made for stimulus dollars to restore the house, and a complete restoration was estimated to cost approximately $500,000.
