= Chillicothe Water and Power Company Pumping Station =

- Chillicothe Water And Power Company Pumping Station
- U.S. National Register of Historic Places
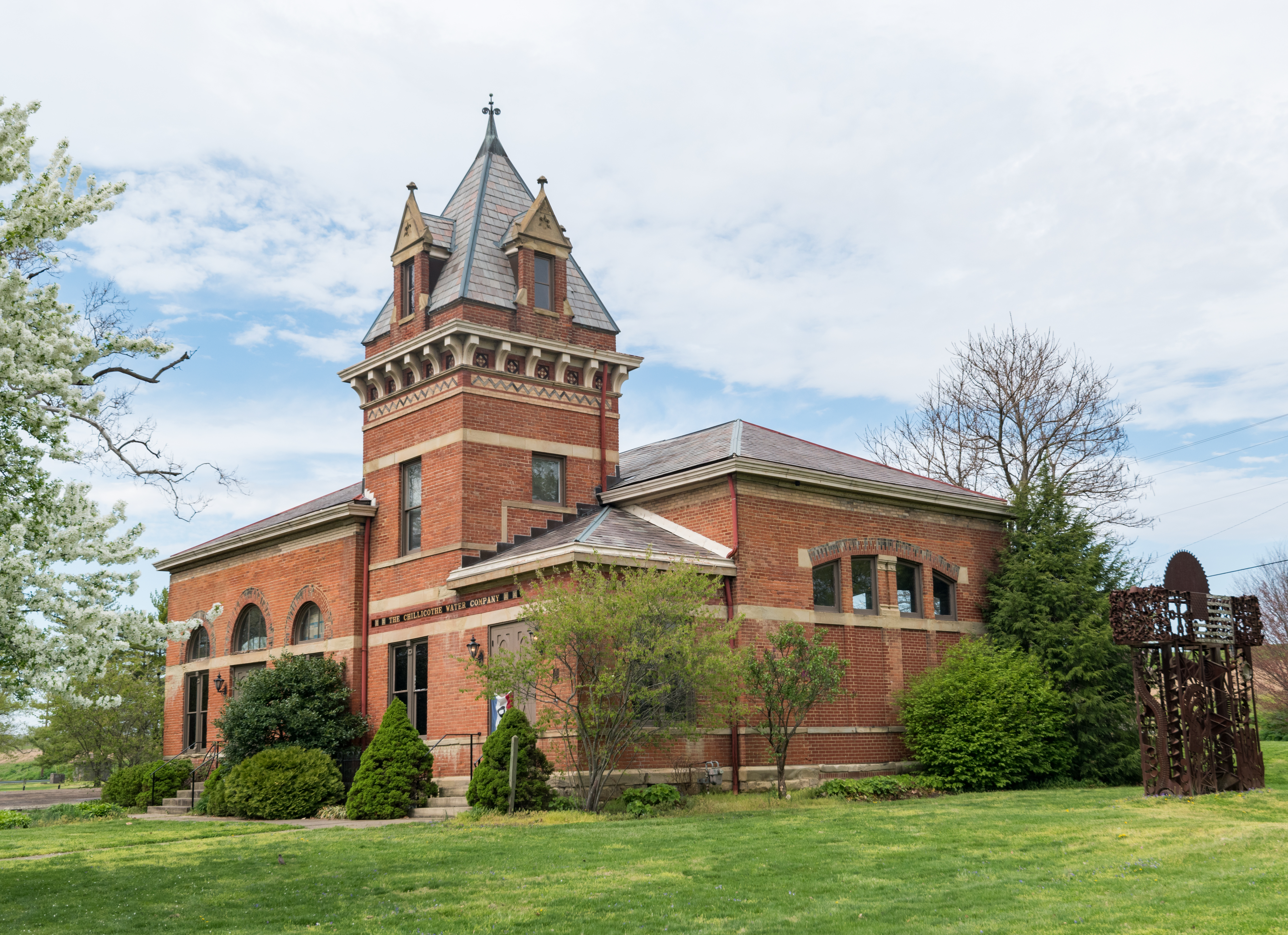

- Location within Ohio Location within the United States
- Location: Enderlin Circle, Chillicothe, Ohio
- Coordinates: 39°20′22″N 82°58′55″W
- Area: Less than 1 acre (0.40 ha)
- Built: 1881
- Architectural style: Gothic Revival
- NRHP reference No.: 79001932
- Added to NRHP: November 15, 1979

The Chillicothe Water and Power Company Pumping Station is a historic building on the northern side of Chillicothe, Ohio, United States. A Gothic Revival structure built in 1881, it was constructed to house the city's waterworks and power plant. Its architecture and its location in Yoctangee Park was chosen specifically in order to beautify the park as well as to have a location near other elements of the city's first waterworks, which were built at the same time as the pumping station.

From 1881 to 1882, Chillicothe constructed a water supply system; among the elements of this system were a well, a massive reservoir, the pumping station in Yoctangee Park, and water mains to supply all parts of the city. A single-story building with a two-and-a-story tower, it is a brick structure with a foundation of sandstone and a slate roof.

By the late 1970s, Chillicothe had erected a new waterworks, and its electricity was supplied by other sources; consequently, the old building was abandoned. Ideas were proposed for its renovation and preservation: plans were laid for its conversion into a community center, and it was listed on the National Register of Historic Places late in 1979. Key to its designation as a historic site was its historic architecture, primarily because of its construction as an "ornament" for Yoctangee Park. Today, the pumping station has been converted into an art gallery, the Pump House Center for the Arts.
