= Hallsville, Ohio =

Unincorporated community in Ohio, U.S.

Coordinates: 39°26′38″N 82°49′38″W

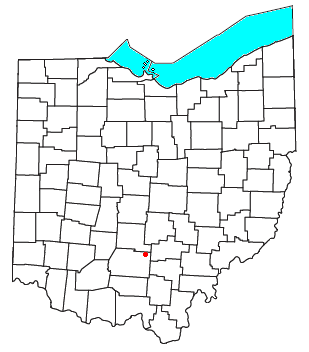
Location of Hallsville, Ohio

Hallsville is an unincorporated community in northeastern Colerain Township, Ross County, Ohio, United States. It has a post office with the ZIP code 45633. It is located along State Route 180.

== History ==
Hallsville was laid out in 1837, and was then also known as Economy, after Economy, Pennsylvania, the previous home of an early settler. The community was originally built up chiefly by Germans. A post office called Hallsville has been in operation since 1830. The present name is derived from William Hall, the first postmaster.

== Gallery ==
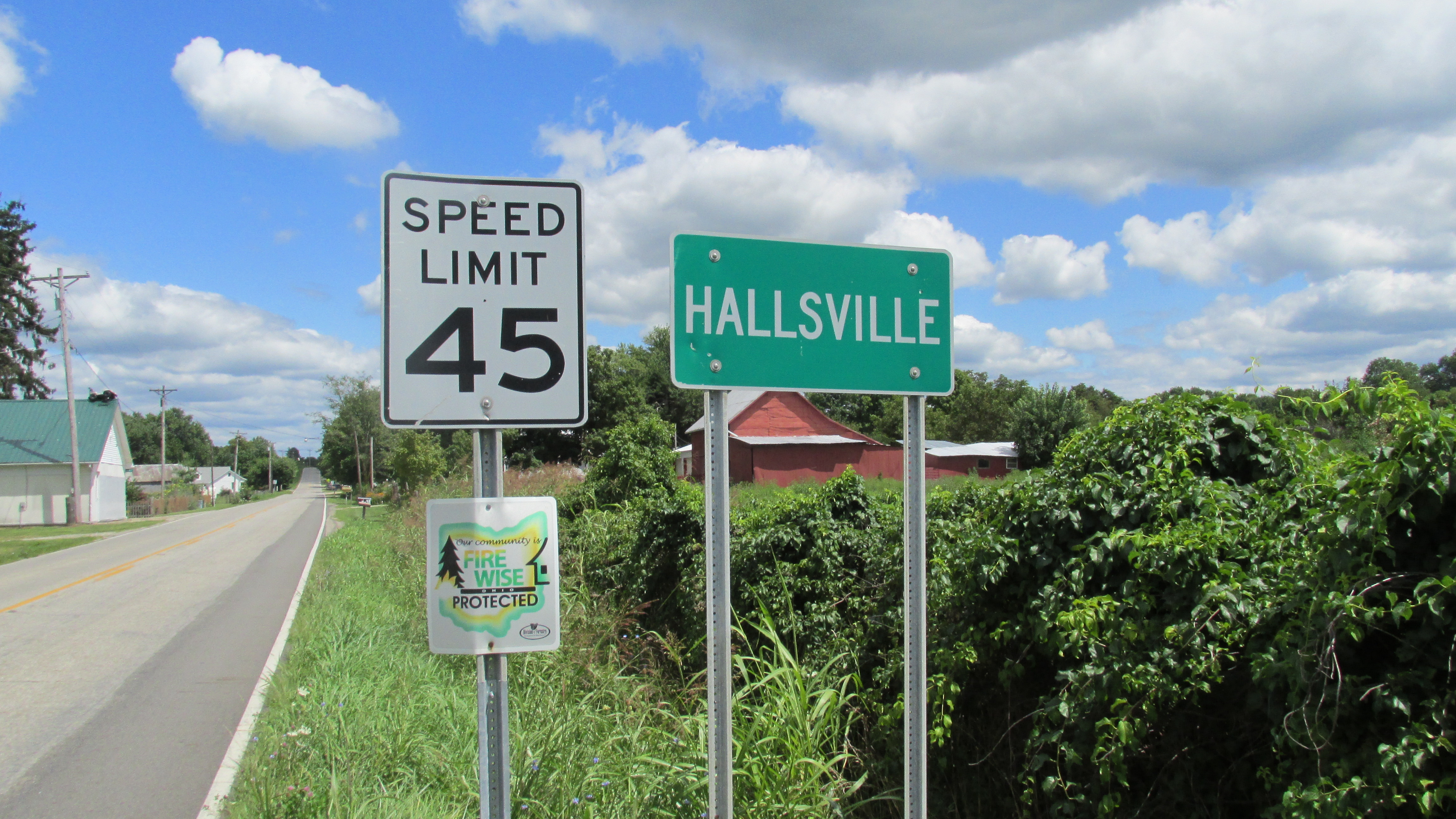
Hallsville community sign

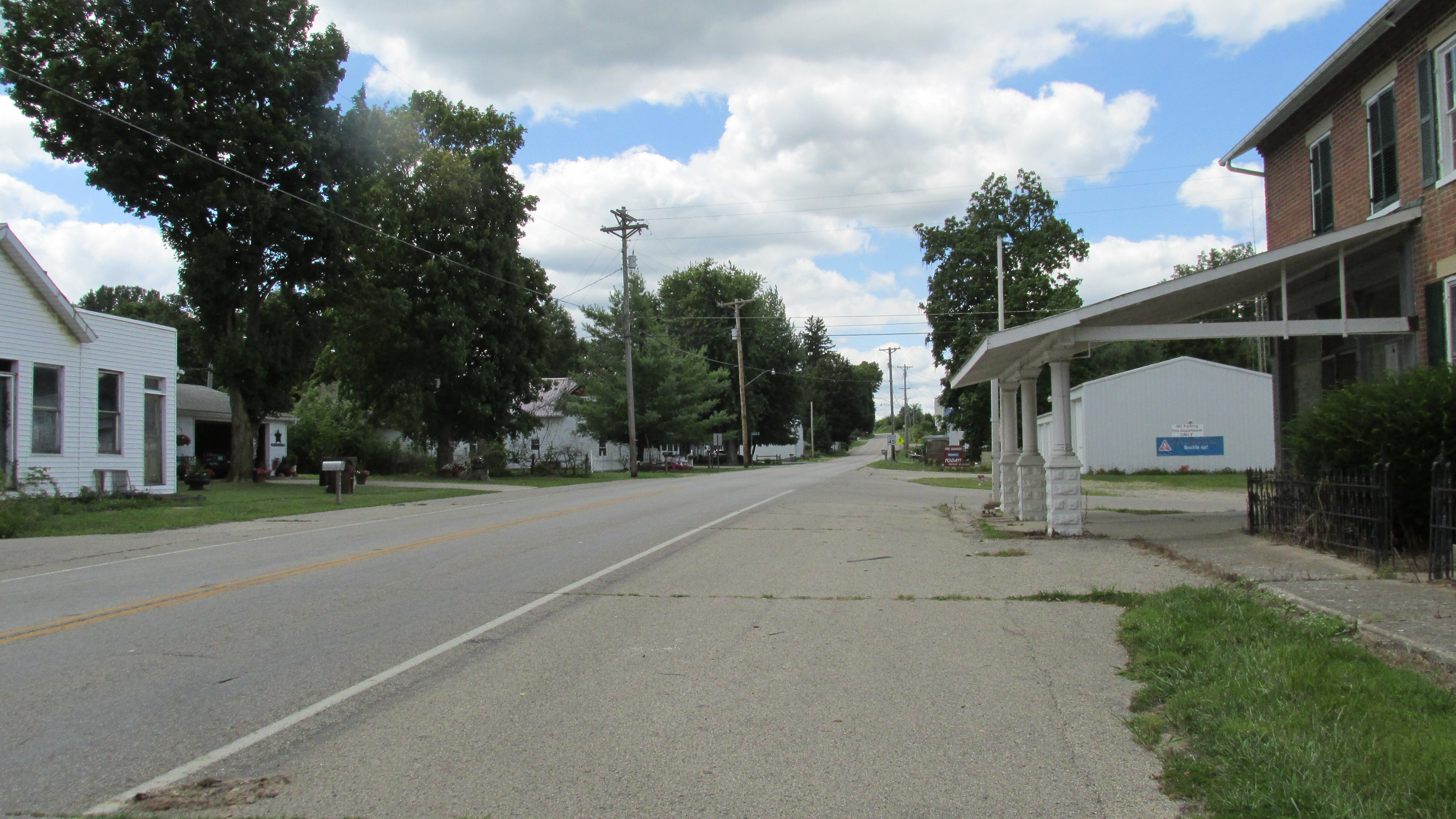
Looking west on Ohio Highway 180 in Hallsville
