= Liberty Township, Ross County, Ohio =

Township in Ohio, US

- Township
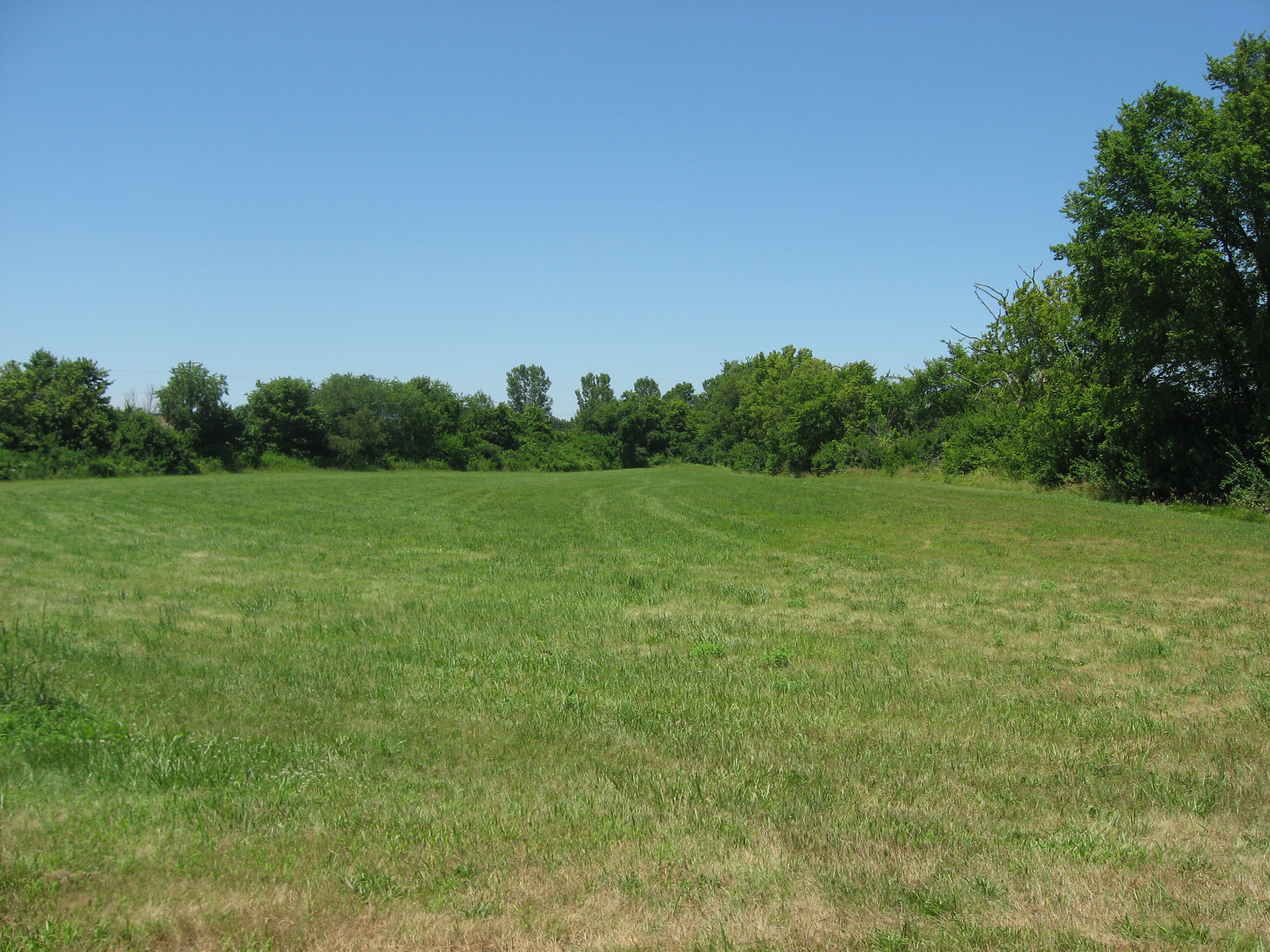
- Interior of the Hopewell High Banks Works

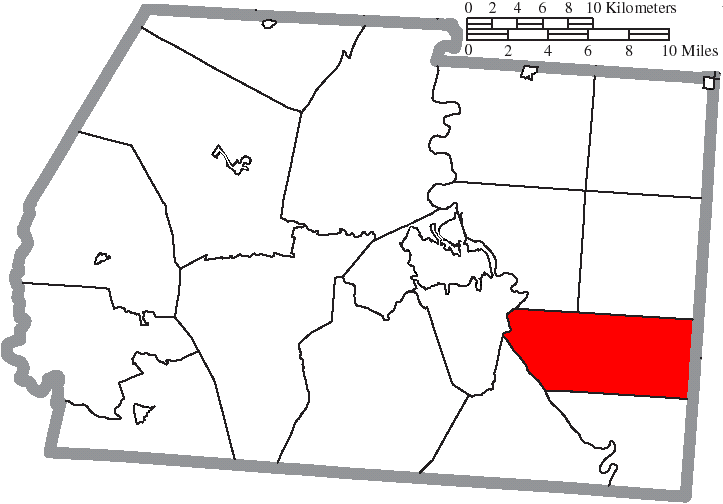
- Location of Liberty Township in Ross County
- Coordinates: 39°16′30″N 82°51′34″W
- Country: United States
- State: Ohio
- County: Ross

Area
  - Total: 34.6 sq mi (89.6 km^{2})
  - Land: 34.4 sq mi (89.1 km^{2})
  - Water: 0.19 sq mi (0.5 km^{2})
- Elevation: 696 ft (212 m)

Population (2020)
  - Total: 2,623
  - Density: 76/sq mi (29.4/km^{2})
- Time zone: UTC-5 (Eastern (EST))
  - Summer (DST): UTC-4 (EDT)
- FIPS code: 39-43302
- GNIS feature ID: 1086900

Liberty Township is one of the sixteen townships of Ross County, Ohio, United States. The 2020 census found 2,623 people in the township.

== Geography ==
Located in the southeastern part of the county, it borders the following townships:

- Harrison Township - north
- Eagle Township, Vinton County - northeast
- Harrison Township, Vinton County - southeast
- Jefferson Township - south
- Scioto Township - southwest
- Franklin Township - west
- Springfield Township - northwest

No municipalities are located in Liberty Township, although the unincorporated community of Londonderry lies in the township's center.

== Name and history ==
It is one of twenty-five Liberty Townships statewide.

== Government ==
The township is governed by a three-member board of trustees, who are elected in November of odd-numbered years to a four-year term beginning on the following January 1. Two are elected in the year after the presidential election and one is elected in the year before it. There is also an elected township fiscal officer, who serves a four-year term beginning on April 1 of the year after the election, which is held in November of the year before the presidential election. Vacancies in the fiscal officership or on the board of trustees are filled by the remaining trustees.
