= Green Township, Ross County, Ohio =

Township in Ohio, US

- Township
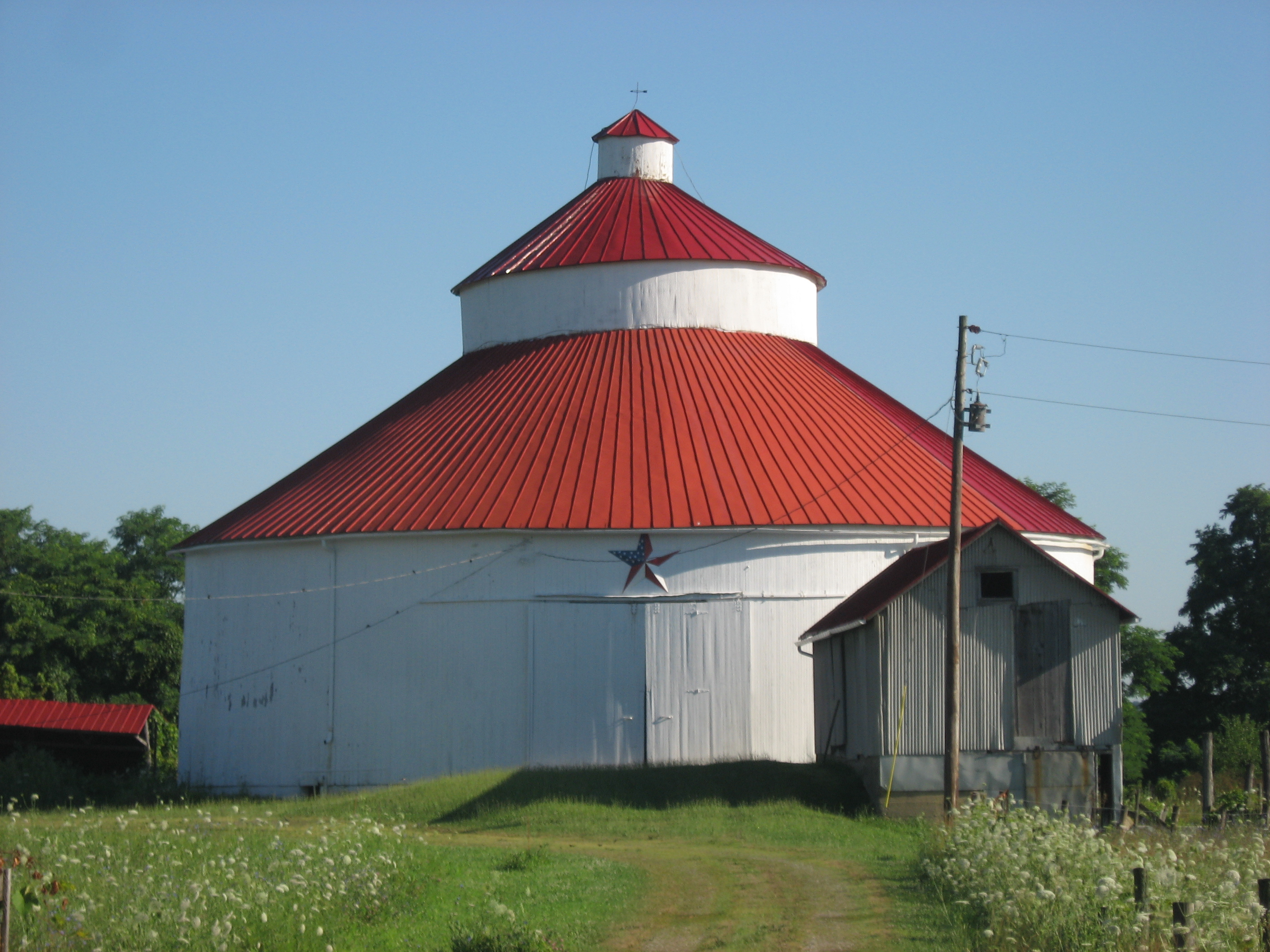
- A round barn in the eastern part of the township

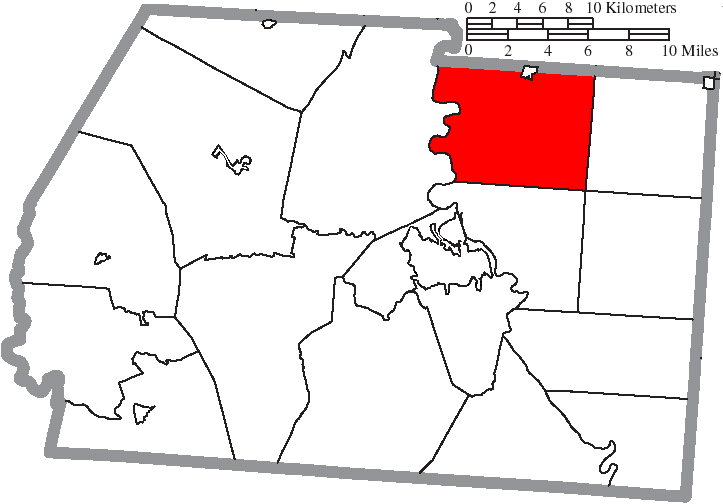
- Location of Green Township in Ross County
- Coordinates: 39°27′1″N 82°55′57″W
- Country: United States
- State: Ohio
- County: Ross

Area
  - Total: 43.4 sq mi (112.5 km^{2})
  - Land: 43.1 sq mi (111.6 km^{2})
  - Water: 0.35 sq mi (0.9 km^{2})
- Elevation: 771 ft (235 m)

Population (2020)
  - Total: 5,186
  - Density: 120/sq mi (46.5/km^{2})
- Time zone: UTC-5 (Eastern (EST))
  - Summer (DST): UTC-4 (EDT)
- FIPS code: 39-31822
- GNIS feature ID: 1086896

Green Township is one of the sixteen townships of Ross County, Ohio, United States. The 2020 census found 5,186 people in the township.

== Geography ==
Located in the northern part of the county, it borders the following townships:

- Pickaway Township, Pickaway County - north
- Salt Creek Township, Pickaway County - northeast corner
- Colerain Township - east
- Harrison Township - southeast corner
- Springfield Township - south
- Union Township - west

The village of Kingston is located in northern Green Township.

== Name and history ==
It is one of sixteen Green Townships statewide.

== Government ==
The township is governed by a three-member board of trustees, who are elected in November of odd-numbered years to a four-year term beginning on the following January 1. Two are elected in the year after the presidential election and one is elected in the year before it. There is also an elected township fiscal officer, who serves a four-year term beginning on April 1 of the year after the election, which is held in November of the year before the presidential election. Vacancies in the fiscal officership or on the board of trustees are filled by the remaining trustees.
