= Renick House =

Historic house in Ohio, United States

- Renick House, Paint Hill
- U.S. National Register of Historic Places
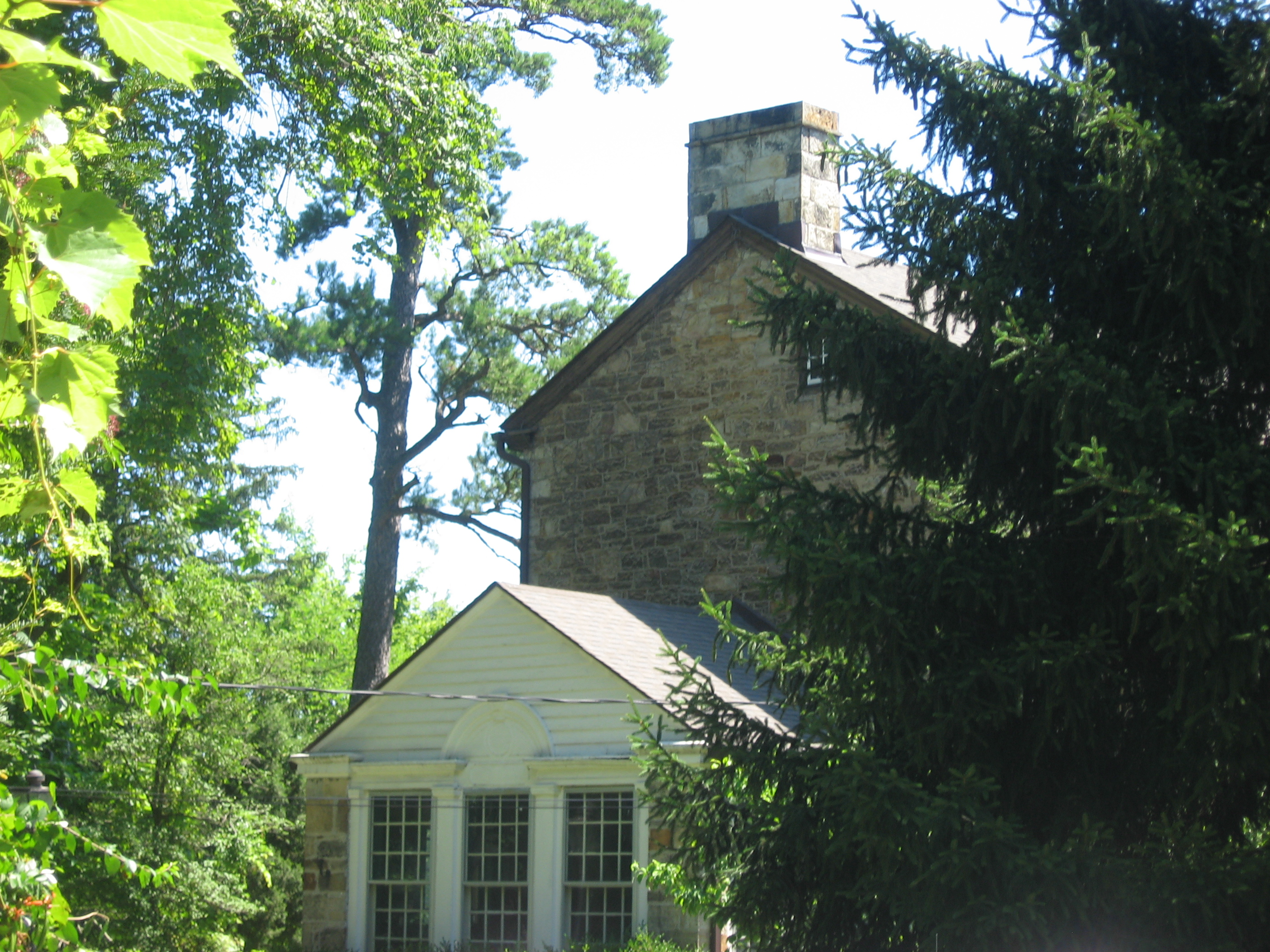
- Western end of the house

- Location within Ohio Location within the United States
- Location: 17 Mead Dr., Chillicothe, Ohio
- Coordinates: 39°19′24″N 82°59′26″W
- Area: 5 acres (2.0 ha)
- Built: 1804
- Architect: Presley Morris
- Architectural style: Virginia Style
- NRHP reference No.: 73001528
- Added to NRHP: May 9, 1973

The Renick House, also known as "Paint Hill", is a historic house in western Chillicothe, Ohio, United States. Built in 1804, it is a two-story stone structure in the shape of the letter "L". Among its most prominent features are gables and large chimneys on each end, a massive central chimney, a central front entrance with a fanlight and a porch with decorative pediment. The house's sandstone façade is pierced by six openings: three windows on the second story and the door and two windows on the first.

This "Virginia-style" Federal house was built under the direction of Presley Morris. Its first inhabitant was prominent Chillicothe resident George Renick, who contributed to one of Ohio's first cattle drives; under his leadership, ninety-six cattle were moved from the Scioto River valley to Baltimore, Maryland. Among the house's later owners was a Presbyterian congregation, which used it as a manse for its minister. In 1904, the house was modified by the addition of an ell on one side.

In 1973, the Renick House was listed on the National Register of Historic Places. It was eligible for the Register both because of its well-preserved historic architecture and its connection to George Renick. One lesser building was sufficiently closely associated with the house that it qualified for inclusion with the house as a contributing property.
