= Anthony and Susan Cardinal Walke House =

Historic house in Ohio, United States

- U.S. National Register of Historic Places
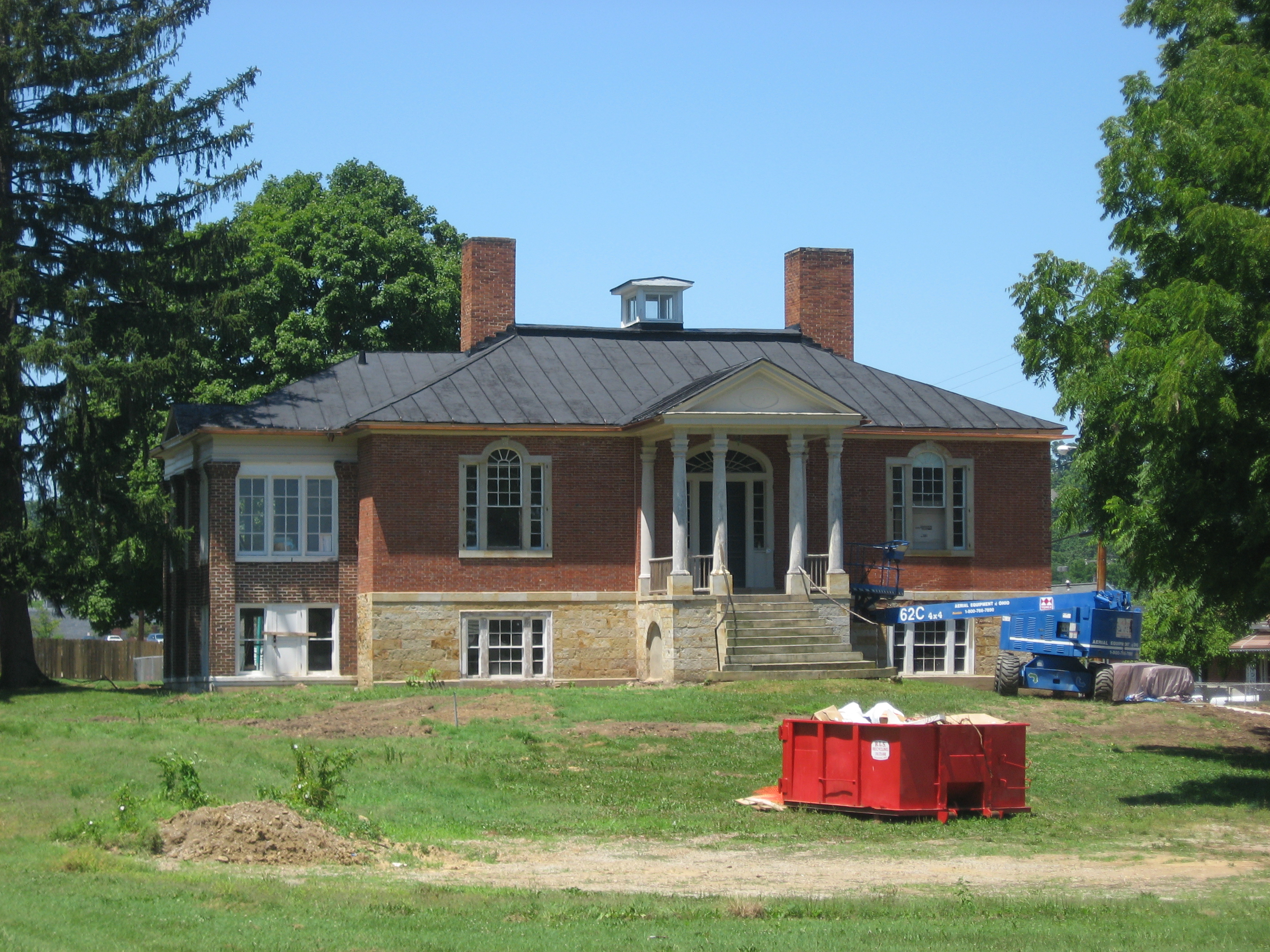
- Front of the house

- Location within Ohio Location within the United States
- Location: 381 Western Ave., Chillicothe, Ohio
- Coordinates: 39°20′6″N 82°59′55″W
- Area: 1.1 acres (0.45 ha)
- Built: 1812
- Architectural style: Early Republic, Colonial Revival
- NRHP reference No.: 07000065
- Added to NRHP: February 21, 2007

The Anthony and Susan Cardinal Walke House is a historic residence on the west side of Chillicothe, Ohio, United States. Erected around 1812, it is a Colonial Revival house built in the style of the early post-independence period of the United States. Its builders, like many other early residents of Chillicothe, were natives of Virginia who brought much of their cultural heritage with them to the Old Northwest.

The approximate construction date for the Walke House is known from local land records, which show that the value of the property rose from $5 to $223 per acre shortly after 1812. It appears that the building was constructed under Thomas James, who owned this piece of land from 1812 to 1819; however, it seems that he never finished construction, for land records suggest that it was completed under the ownership of Cadwallader Wallace, who owned it from 1819 to 1820. Wallace sold this land to Anthony Walke, the namesake of the house; among the members of the Walke family was Anthony's second son, Henry, who became both a prominent artist and an admiral in the United States Navy.

Various elements of the Federal and Classical Revival architectural styles are present at the Walke House, including the prominent front portico with its four columns. A single-story building set on an above-ground basement, which in turn rests on a foundation of sandstone, the house features such elements as a fanlight, multiple Palladian windows, and a hip roof. Despite some modifications made during the early twentieth century, the house remains largely as it was when it was built; the interior woodwork has been preserved, as have all exterior elements except for the roof.

Today, the house is surrounded by its original lawn; although the city has grown to surround the property, the house's immediate vicinity is essentially unchanged and thus presents a significant contrast to the surrounding neighborhood. In 2007, the Walke House was listed on the National Register of Historic Places, due to its prominent place in the architecture of Chillicothe.
