= Seip House =

Historic house in Ohio, United States

- U.S. National Register of Historic Places
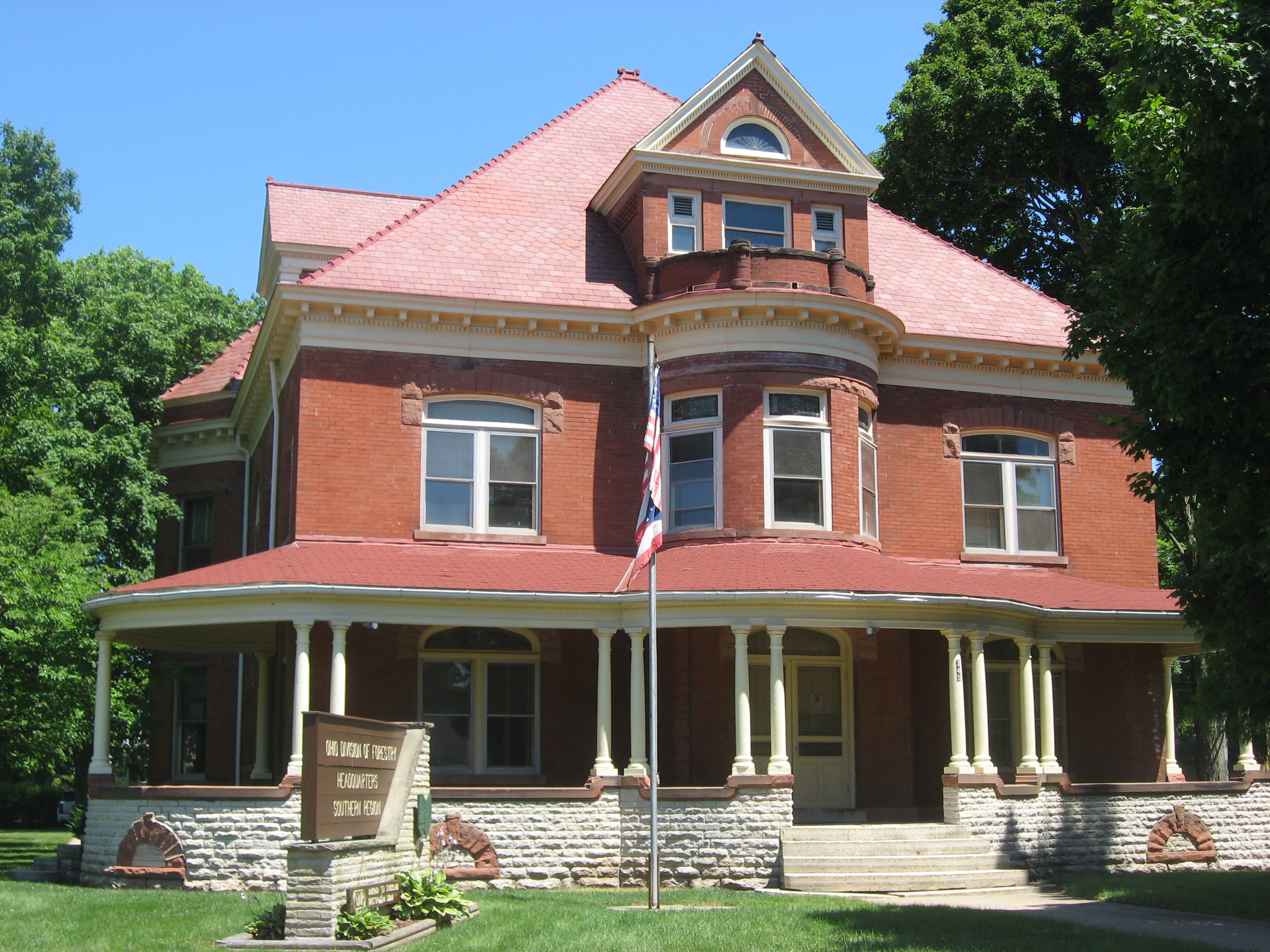
- Front of the house

- Location within Ohio Location within the United States
- Location: 345 Allen Ave., Chillicothe, Ohio
- Coordinates: 39°20′30″N 82°59′37″W
- Area: less than one acre
- Built: 1895
- Architect: John Cook
- Architectural style: Queen Anne
- NRHP reference No.: 81000450
- Added to NRHP: May 12, 1981

The Seip House is a historic building on the west side of Chillicothe, Ohio, United States. Built in 1895, it is among the city's grandest houses.

Born in Germany in the late 1810s, Charles Seip was a butcher who settled in the United States in 1845. Soon after crossing the Atlantic, Seip took up residence in Chillicothe; he soon began operating a butcher shop on Allen Avenue, married, and became prosperous. As his business grew, Seip expanded into downtown premises and began to purchase farms in the Chillicothe vicinity in order to supply more animals for his business.

By the 1890s, Seip's son John had persuaded his father to erect a large house on the site of his original butcher shop. The resulting building took four years to complete, being started in 1895 and completed in 1898. A two-and-a-half story building, designed by John Cook, it is a brick building that sits on a sandstone foundation; its roof, covered with slates, is a hip roof that rises to the center of the house.

At his death in 1902, Seip owned some of the leading properties in Ross County. His house was one of the most prominent Queen Anne homes in Chillicothe, and he owned seven different farms in the region. Since that time, the house has changed hands; in 1955, the Ohio Department of Natural Resources purchased the house and converted it into offices for its regional forestry headquarters. In recognition of its historic architecture, the house was listed on the National Register of Historic Places in 1981.
