= Colerain Township, Ross County, Ohio =

Township in Ohio, US

- Township
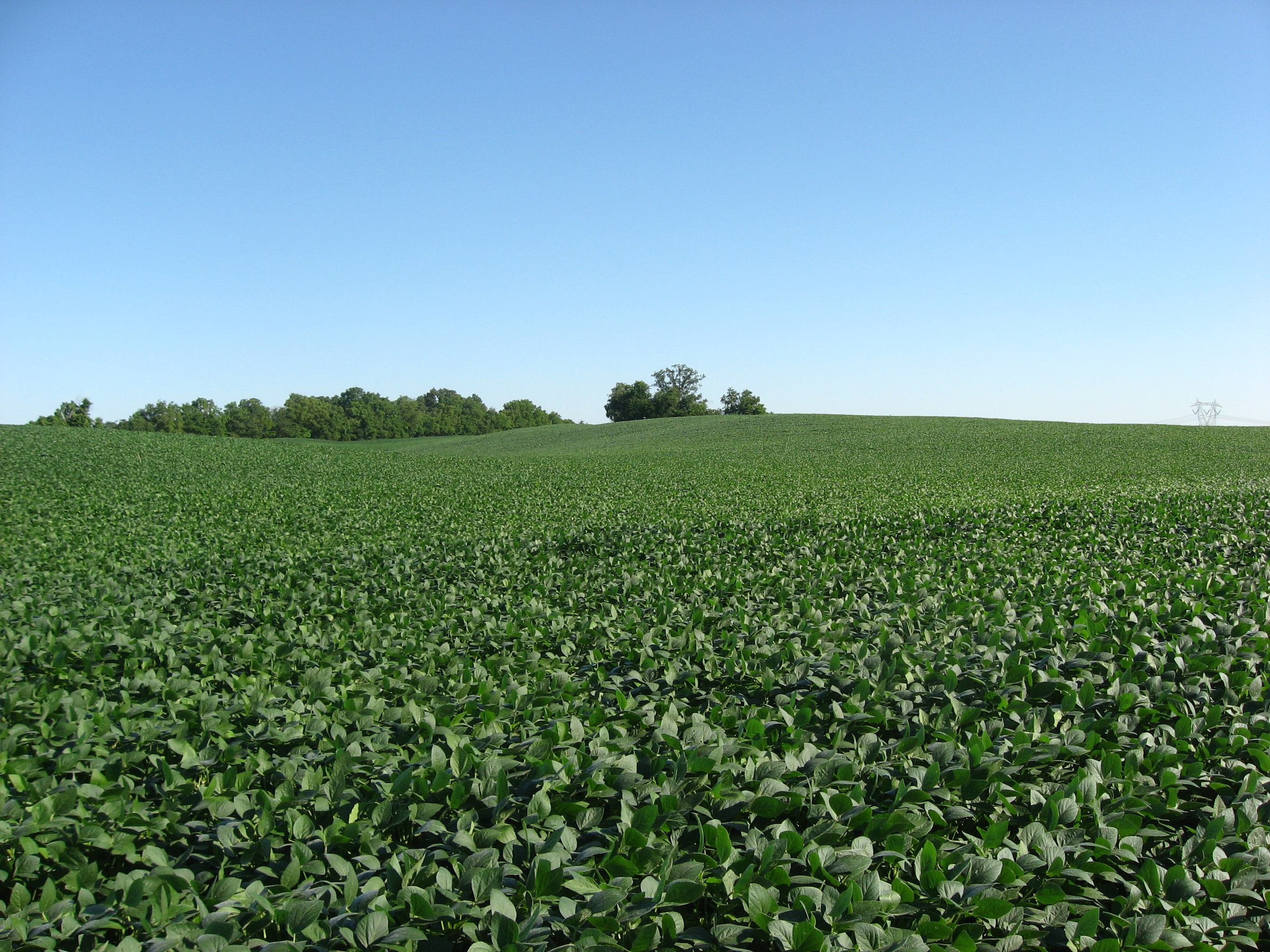
- Soybean fields in the township

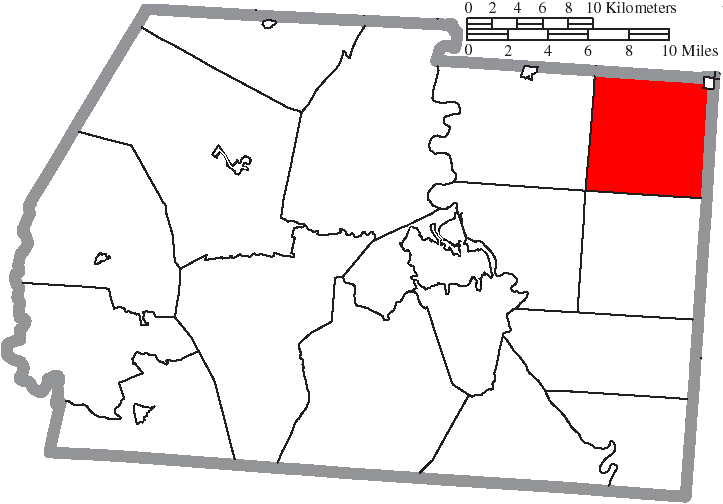
- Location of Colerain Township in Ross County
- Coordinates: 39°26′17″N 82°46′56″W
- Country: United States
- State: Ohio
- County: Ross

Area
  - Total: 35.4 sq mi (91.6 km^{2})
  - Land: 35.3 sq mi (91.5 km^{2})
  - Water: 0.039 sq mi (0.1 km^{2})
- Elevation: 899 ft (274 m)

Population (2020)
  - Total: 2,017
  - Density: 57/sq mi (22/km^{2})
- Time zone: UTC-5 (Eastern (EST))
  - Summer (DST): UTC-4 (EDT)
- FIPS code: 39-16630
- GNIS feature ID: 1086892

Colerain Township is one of the sixteen townships of Ross County, Ohio, United States. The 2020 census found 2,017 people in the township.

== Geography ==
Located in the northeastern corner of the county, it borders the following townships:

- Salt Creek Township, Pickaway County - north
- Perry Township, Hocking County - northeast corner
- Salt Creek Township, Hocking County - east
- Harrison Township - south
- Springfield Township - southwest corner
- Green Township - west
- Pickaway Township, Pickaway County - northwest corner

Two populated places are located in northeastern Colerain Township: the village of Adelphi and the unincorporated community of Hallsville.

== Name and history ==
Statewide, other Colerain Townships are located in Belmont and Hamilton counties.

== Government ==
The township is governed by a three-member board of trustees, who are elected in November of odd-numbered years to a four-year term beginning on the following January 1. Two are elected in the year after the presidential election and one is elected in the year before it. There is also an elected township fiscal officer, who serves a four-year term beginning on April 1 of the year after the election, which is held in November of the year before the presidential election. Vacancies in the fiscal officership or on the board of trustees are filled by the remaining trustees.
