= Great Seal State Park =

State park in Ohio, United States

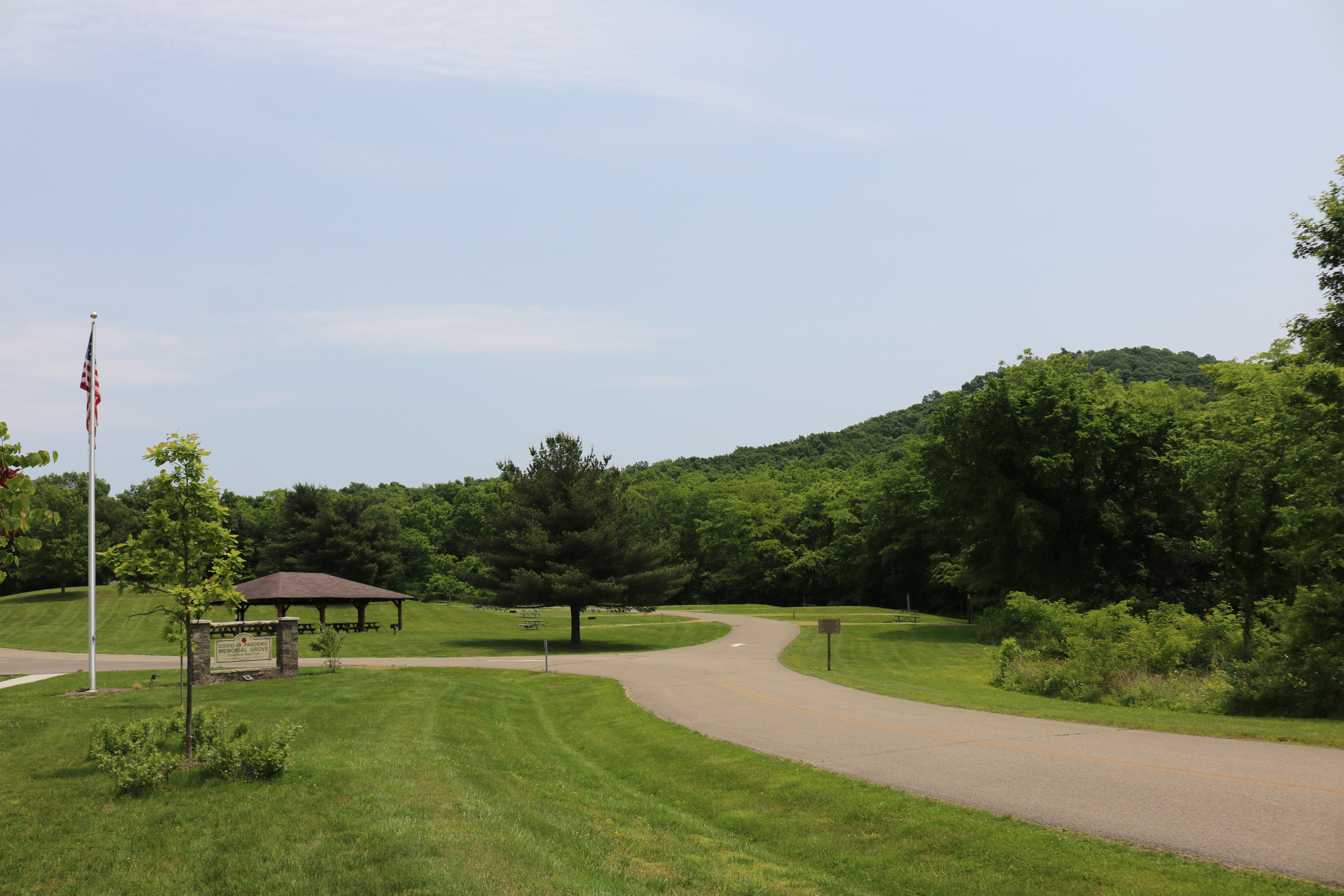
- Looking over the COVID-19 Pandemic State Memorial Grove

- Location within Ohio Location within the United States
- Location: Ross County, Ohio, United States
- Coordinates: 39°22′56″N 82°57′24″W
- Area: 1,682 acres (681 ha)
- Established: 1979
- Administrator: Ohio Department of Natural Resources
- Designation: Ohio state park
- Website: Official website

Great Seal State Park is a 1,682-acre (681 ha) state park located north of Chillicothe in Ross County, Ohio. The park encompasses hilly, forested terrain in the Scioto River valley; it takes its name from the Great Seal of the State of Ohio, as its landscape inspired the seal's design. Park amenities include hiking and multi-use trails, primitive campsites, and an 18-hole disc golf course. The Ohio Department of Natural Resources maintains the park.

The park includes the COVID-19 Pandemic Memorial Grove, which opened in 2021 as a memorial to both the victims and survivors of the COVID-19 pandemic. The site includes 15 trees, all native species to Ohio, and a paved walkway.

== History ==
The Shawnee people inhabited the land that is now Great Seal State Park prior to the arrival of Europeans; Chillicothe was a Shawnee town, and several major trails passed through the area. European settlers first moved into the area in 1790, and Chillicothe became Ohio's first state capital in 1803. Politicians Thomas Worthington, Edward Tiffin, and William Creighton collaborated on the design of the new state's seal; the hills, river, and fields portrayed on the seal were inspired by the view of what is now Great Seal State Park from Worthington's home.

Planning for the state park began in 1972, with state representative Myrl Shoemaker and several local politicians proposing a park to the Department of Natural Resources. While the original plans called for a 7,500-acre (3,000 ha) park, objections from area landowners led to the plans being scaled back to under 2,000 acres (810 ha). The park opened to the public with limited access in 1979.
