= Oak Hill (Chillicothe, Ohio) =

Historic house in Ohio, United States

- U.S. National Register of Historic Places
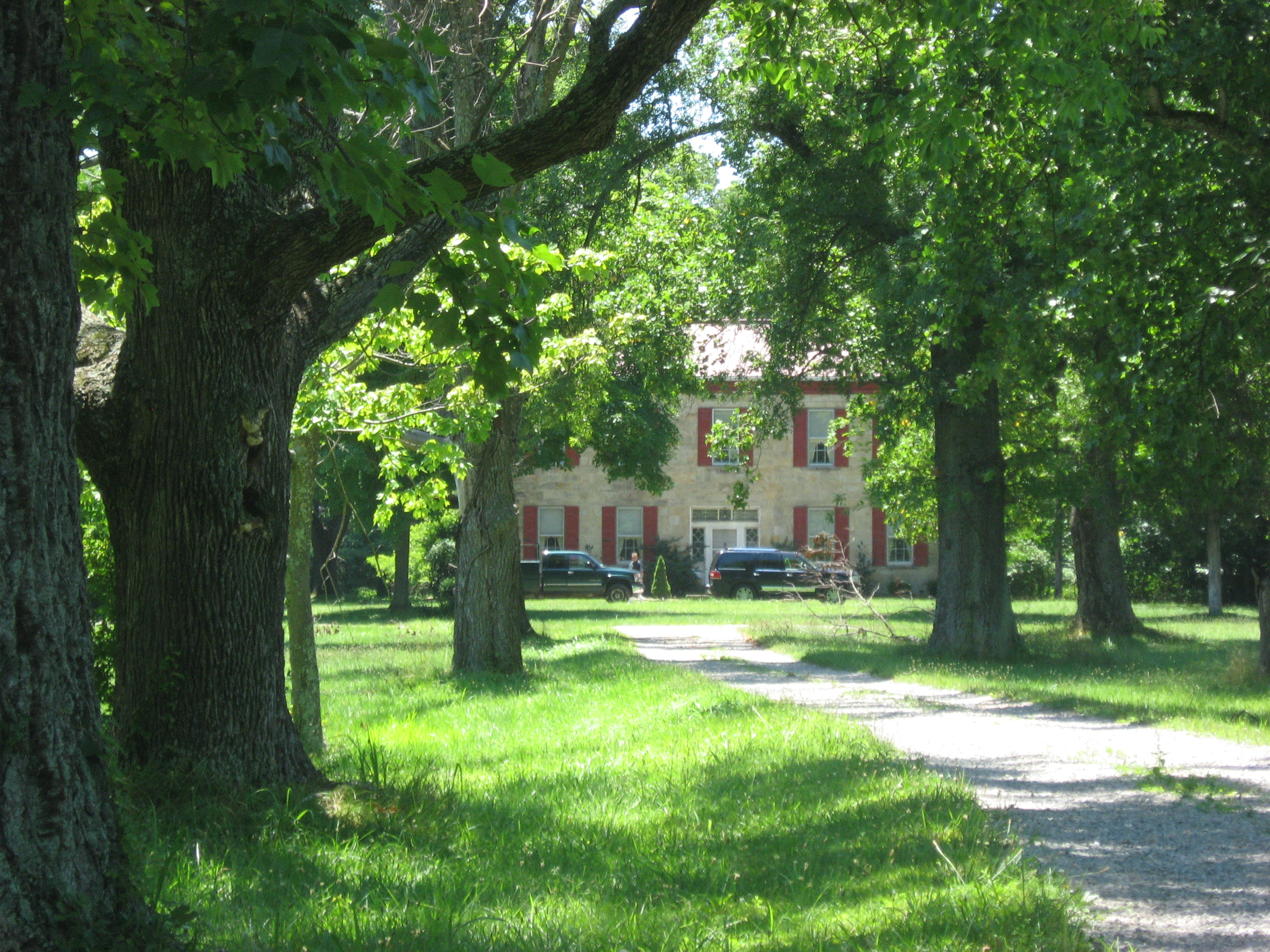
- Distant view of the house

- Location within Ohio Location within the United States
- Location: Dun Rd., Chillicothe, Ohio
- Coordinates: 39°19′35″N 83°1′28″W
- Area: Less than 1 acre (0.40 ha)
- Built: 1838
- Architect: G.W. Dun
- Architectural style: Federal, vernacular Adam style
- NRHP reference No.: 73001527
- Added to NRHP: April 3, 1973

Oak Hill is a historic former farmhouse in the southern part of the U.S. state of Ohio. Located along Dun Road in Ross County, it is one of the finest examples of sandstone farmhouses in the vicinity of the city of Chillicothe.

The house was built by George William Dun, a native of Scotland who settled near Chillicothe in 1838. Almost immediately upon taking up residence at the site, he began the construction of his house, which was completed in 1840. A large two-story building constructed in the Federal style of architecture, it represents an American version of the British Adam style.

In 1973, the house was listed on the National Register of Historic Places because of its well-preserved historic architecture. It received this recognition for multiple reasons: the massive hardwood trees on the grounds evoke a sense of antiquity; the exterior is better preserved than that of almost any other period sandstone house; and the interior retains much of its original condition, including much of the furniture once owned by George Dun's ancestors.
