= Canal Warehouse (Chillicothe, Ohio) =

- U.S. National Register of Historic Places
- U.S. Historic district – Contributing property
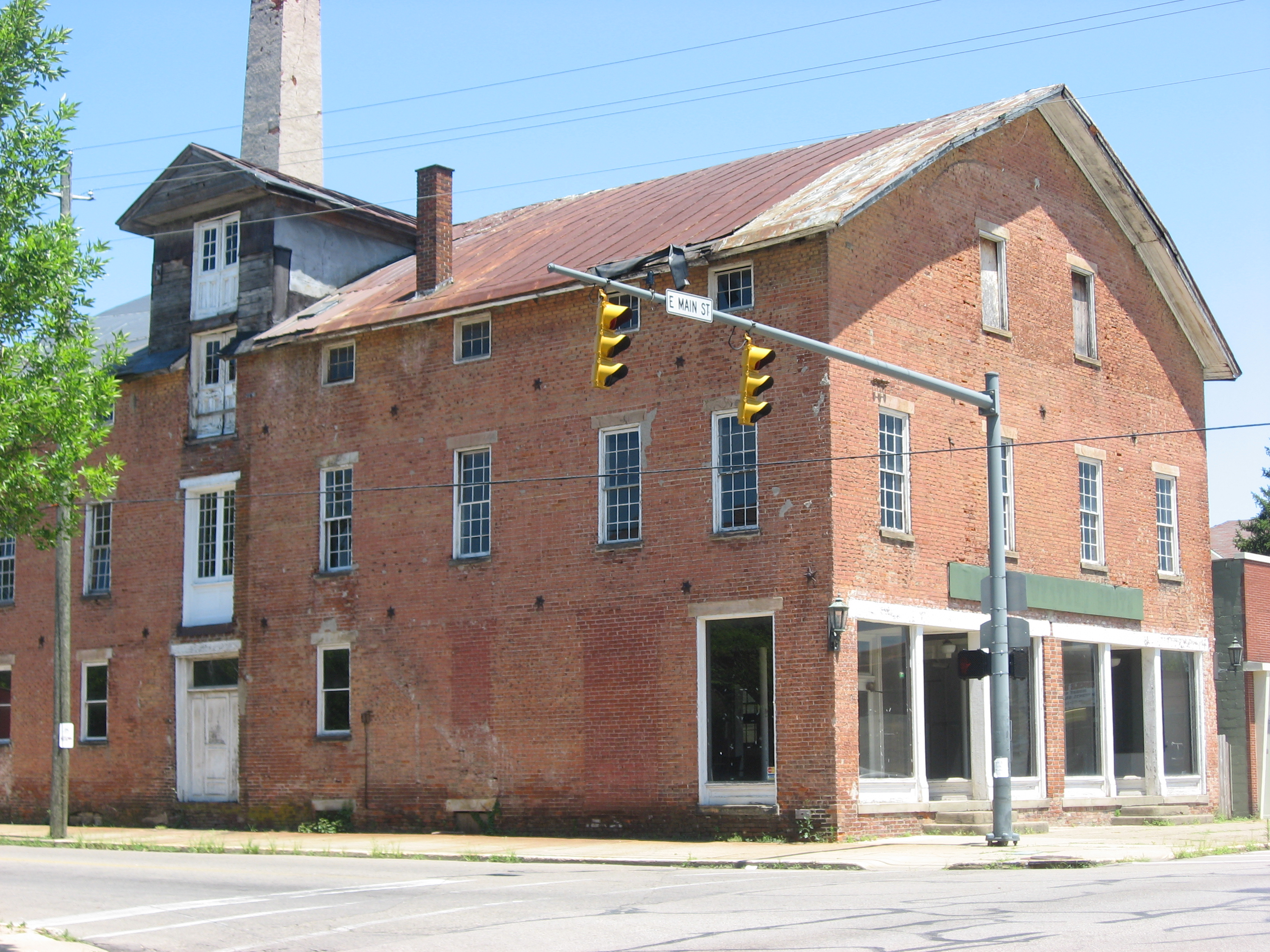
- Front and side of the warehouse. Notice the large dormer on the side.

- Location within Ohio Location within the United States
- Location: Main and Mulberry Sts., Chillicothe, Ohio
- Coordinates: 39°20′3″N 82°58′44″W
- Area: 0 acres (0 ha)
- Built: 1830
- Part of: Chillicothe Business District (ID79001931)
- NRHP reference No.: 73001522
- Added to NRHP: April 24, 1973

The Canal Warehouse is a historic warehouse at the intersection of Main and Mulberry Streets in downtown Chillicothe, Ohio, United States. Built in 1830, along the Ohio and Erie Canal, this three-story brick building is an ornate gabled structure with large dormers set into both sides of the main roof. These dormers served a purpose far different from decoration: their windows connect with first-floor doors to enable longshoremen easily to move goods into or out of the third floor. On the ground level, individuals can enter the warehouse through either of two recessed doorways; three stone steps climb from the sidewalk to each doorway.

After it ceased to operate as a canalside warehouse, the building was converted into a clubhouse for the local post of the Veterans of Foreign Wars. Today, the warehouse has been recognized as a leading example of canal-related architecture; few warehouses built for the Ohio and Erie Canal survive in comparable condition. In recognition of its place in local transportation history, the Canal Warehouse was listed on the National Register of Historic Places in 1974. Additionally, it lies within the boundaries of the Chillicothe Business District, a historic district that was added to the National Register in 1979.
