= Union Township, Ross County, Ohio =

Township in Ohio, US

- Township
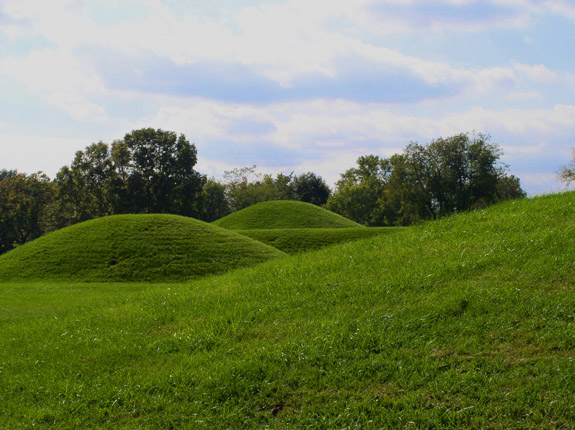
- Reconstructed mounds at Hopewell Culture National Historical Park

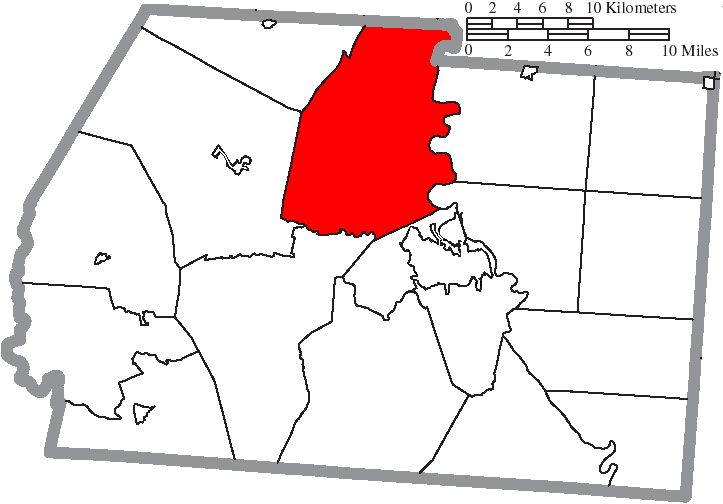
- Location of Union Township in Ross County
- Coordinates: 39°24′20″N 83°2′14″W
- Country: United States
- State: Ohio
- County: Ross

Area
  - Total: 66.8 sq mi (173.1 km^{2})
  - Land: 66.4 sq mi (171.9 km^{2})
  - Water: 0.46 sq mi (1.2 km^{2})
- Elevation: 863 ft (263 m)

Population (2020)
  - Total: 12,530
  - Density: 189/sq mi (72.9/km^{2})
- Time zone: UTC-5 (Eastern (EST))
  - Summer (DST): UTC-4 (EDT)
- FIPS code: 39-78540
- GNIS feature ID: 1086906

Union Township is one of the sixteen townships of Ross County, Ohio, United States. The 2020 census found 12,530 people in the township.

== Geography ==
Located in the northern part of the county, it borders the following townships:

- Wayne Township, Pickaway County - north
- Pickaway Township, Pickaway County - northeast
- Green Township - east
- Springfield Township - southeast
- Scioto Township - south
- Twin Township - southwest
- Concord Township - west
- Deerfield Township - northwest

No municipalities are located in Union Township.

== Name and history ==
It is one of twenty-seven Union Townships statewide.

== Government ==
The township is governed by a three-member board of trustees, who are elected in November of odd-numbered years to a four-year term beginning on the following January 1. Two are elected in the year after the presidential election and one is elected in the year before it. There is also an elected township fiscal officer, who serves a four-year term beginning on April 1 of the year after the election, which is held in November of the year before the presidential election. Vacancies in the fiscal officership or on the board of trustees are filled by the remaining trustees.

Ross Correctional Institution is in the township.
