= Ohio Southern Railroad (1881–1898) =

Map

The Ohio Southern Railroad operated between Ironton, Ohio, and Lima, Ohio, from 1893 and 1905. Beginning in 1878 as the narrow gauge Springfield, Jackson and Pomeroy Railroad, it ran from Jackson-Wellston, Jackson County to Springfield, Ohio. The line was converted to a standard gauge by 1880 and renamed the Ohio Southern Railroad in 1881. From Jeffersonville, branch lines were started towards Columbus to the northeast and Cincinnati to the southwest, but never completed. By September 1893, the Ohio Southern had reached north to Lima with a bridge over the Great Miami River at Quincy. At Lima, the freight could link to the Lima Northern Railway for points further north. In 1898, the Lima Northern became the Detroit and Lima Northern Railroad (D&LN). Ohio Southern depots continue to stand in St. Johns, Uniopolis, Jackson Center, Quincy, and Rosewood.

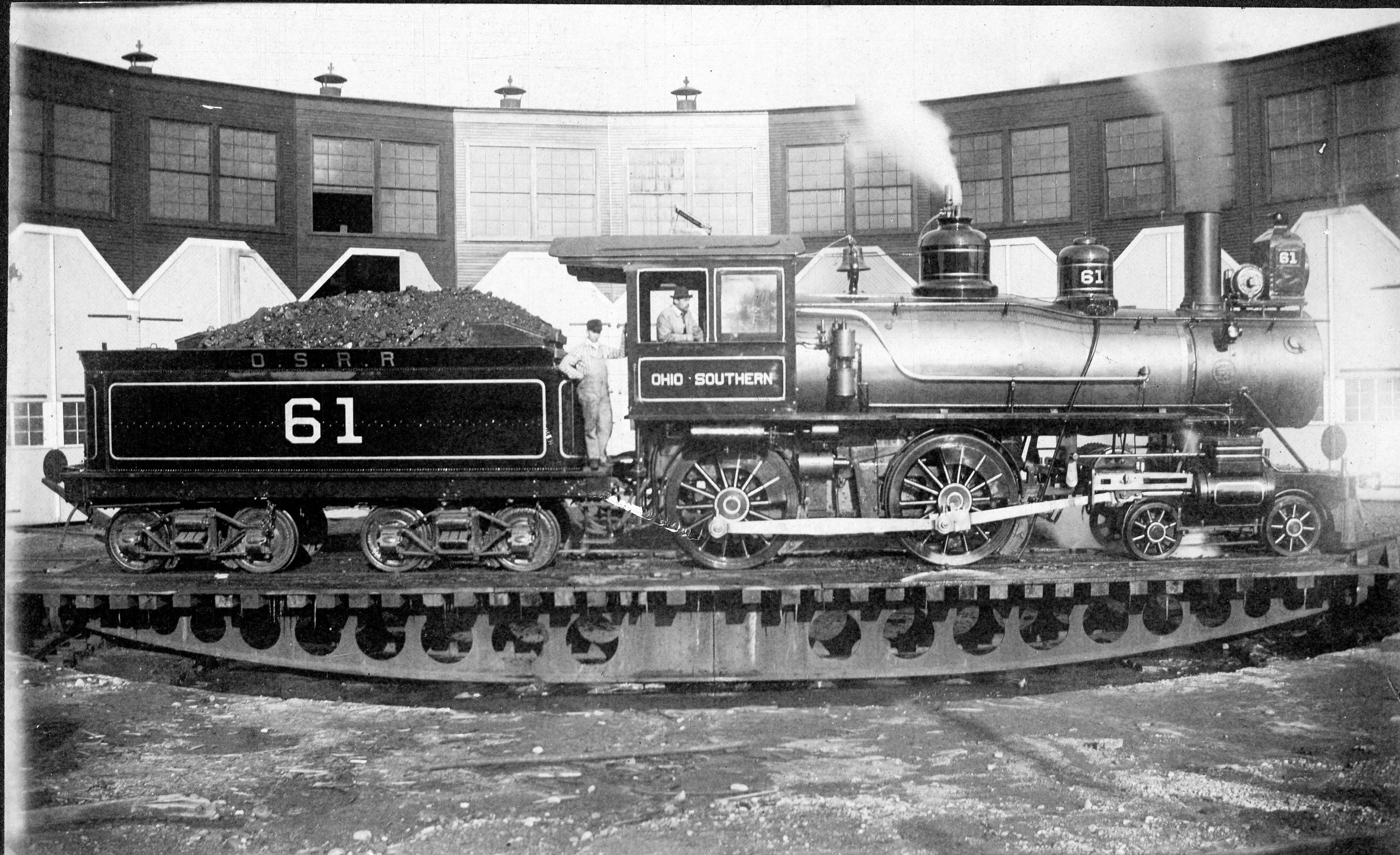

== History ==
Planned as a narrow gauge railroad from the southeastern Ohio mineral lands connecting to Springfield, Fort Wayne and on to Chicago, the Ohio Southern Railroad never left the state of Ohio until it was taken over by the Detroit, Toledo & Ironton (DTI), serving the automobile industry in Detroit, Michigan. Originating as the Springfield, Jackson & Pomeroy Railroad on December 17, 1874, as a means to link the three towns incorporated in its name. The Dayton & South Eastern (D&SE) had been incorporated earlier to provide the same linkages, by a circuitous route, avoiding the large hills on a more direct alignment. The townspeople of Springfield did not wish to be a branch line, so joining with the other towns missed by the D&SE the SJ&P was born.

Both lines were intended to be an outlet for the coal deposits of Jackson and Wellston. Construction began on the SJ&P from Jackson on December 7, 1876. The necessary $800,000 in capital had taken two years to raise. A second construction effort began on March 26, 1877, from Springfield. Until July of that year, the line operated as two routes. In June of the following year a branch line to Eureka was completed. Numerous coal mine spurs were constructed.

In 1879, the Springfield, Jackson & Pomeroy was sold at a sheriff's sale to Oliver S. Kelly. Kelly with a group of ten formed the Springfield Southern Railroad Co on November 3, 1879. The plan to extend the line to Rockwood in Lawrence County was never realized, but the SSR did convert the line to standard gauge. On May 23, 1881, the Spring Southern became the Ohio Southern Railroad Company. The company began to make some money at this time. The Ohio Southern was leased by the Indiana, Bloomington & Western Railroad (IB&W), which was building east from Indianapolis to Springfield, and the Chesapeake & Ohio (C&O) building westward from Springfield. The IB&W later became the Peoria & Eastern. IB&W control of the Ohio Southern ended in April 1892.

In December 1892, the OS began extending its mainline north from Springfield to Lima, creating a longer single haul roadway. It was completed in December 1893. In 1894, a spur was established to Wellston, plus several to coal mines. On May 9, 1895, the Ohio Southern was forced into receivership due to the financial strain caused by the Lima extension. A group of bondholders purchased the property on October 15, 1898. The Ohio Southern ceased to operate as an independent railroad.

=== Extension to Ironton ===
On February 11, 1848, a Special Act of the Ohio General Assembly authorized the incorporation of the Iron Railroad Company, and during 1849-50 a six-mile line was built from Ironton to the Vesuvius Tunnel Mines. It was extended in 1853 to Center Station. By 1858, though, the structure spanning Sterrns Creek north of Ironton was considered too weak to carry increased loads and a wrought iron truss, patented by W. H. Moseley and fabricated in Cincinnati, was erected over the stream. This wrought-iron bridge remained in service until 1924, when it was removed and placed on exhibition in the Henry Ford Museum in Dearborn, Michigan, some years later.

== Cincinnati, Columbus & Hocking Valley Railroad. ==
From November 28, 1883, until May 31, 1884, the Ohio Southern operated a small railroad, the Cincinnati, Columbus & Hocking Valley. The CC&HV extended from Jeffersonville with the Ohio Southern west to Claysville Junction on the Little Miami Railroad's Cincinnati-Xenia main line. Organized on December 9, 1875, as the Waynesville, Port William & Jeffersonville Railroad Co. The owners were among group of ten involved with the Springfield, Jackson & Pomoroy. The CC&HV completed 15 miles from Jeffersonville to Port William by October 1877, and the following month was reorganized as the Columbus, Washington & Cincinnati Railroad Co. By 1887, the W&C was abandoned and tracks removed. In March 1884, the Ohio Southern purchased a portion of the roadbed for a Cincinnati-Columbus line. Built from Sedalia through Jeffersonville and on to Kingman, the line was never finished and it was abandoned in several stages from 1931 and 1941.

The Detroit & Lima Northern (D&LN) was planning a line from Columbus to Fort Wayne, Indiana, the Columbus Northwestern Railway, (CNW) incorporated in August 1897. The CNW constructed a small portion of a line Columbus Junction (later named Salter's) to Peoria in August 1898. The Detroit & Lima Northern finished a link from Columbus Junction to St. Mary's by November 1 of that year. Then the D&LN leased from the Ohio Southern the Lima to Columbus Junction link to the CNW. The bondholders who had purchased the Ohio Southern in 1989 refused to renew this lease. On December 1, 1900, the D&LN ended its financial affiliation with the Columbus Northwestern and ended service into Columbus over the Toledo and Ohio Central Railway. The Columbus Northwestern later was to become a portion of the T&OC system.

== Merger ==
In 1901, the Ohio Southern Railway merged with the Detroit and Lima Northern Railway and formed the Detroit Southern Railroad. This company was purchased at foreclosure on May 1, 1905, by Harry B. Hollins & Company of New York, which reincorporated it in the state of Michigan under the name of the Detroit, Toledo and Ironton Railway.

== Stations ==
The Ohio Southern operated a single mainline in Ohio from Lima to Ironton. Stations included (from north to south):

=== Lima to Springfield ===
- Lima
- Uniopolis
- St. Johns
- Geyer
- Jackson Center
- Maplewood
- Quincy
- Rosewood
- St. Paris
- Tremont City
- Tremont City
- Maitland

=== Springfield to Washington C.H. ===
- Springfield
- Royal
- South Charleston
- South Solon
- Blessing
- Jeffersonville
- Parrott
- Hagler

=== Washington C.H. to Greenfield ===
- Washington C.H.
- Bookwalter or Boyd
- Good Hope

=== Greenfield to Jackson ===
- Greenfield
- Thrifton
- Fruitdale
- Pricer Ridge, now known as Humboldt
- Bainbridge
- Storms (Spargursville)
- Harris
- Summit
- Denver
- Waverly
- Glen Jean
- Greggs
- Givens
- Dove
- Jeffersonville
- Glade
- Cove

=== Jackson to Lisman ===
Along SR 93

- Jackson
- unidentified
- unidentified
- unidentified

=== Lisman to Ironton ===
Along SR 93

- Lisman
- Pedro
- Vesuvius
- La Grange
- Ironton
