= The Devil All the Time =

The Devil All the Time may refer to:

- The Devil All the Time (film)
- The Devil All the Time (novel)
