= Ross County =

Ross County can refer to:

- Ross County, Ohio, a region in the United States
- Ross County F.C., a Scottish football club
- Ross-shire, a county in Scotland
