= Three Locks, Ohio =

Unincorporated community in Ohio, U.S.

Coordinates: 39°15′11″N 82°54′33″W

Three Locks is an unincorporated community in Ross County, in the U.S. state of Ohio.

Three Locks was located on the Ohio and Erie Canal.
