= Slate Mills =

Slate Mills may refer to:

- Slate Mills, Ohio, an unincorporated community in Ross County
- Slate Mills, Virginia, an unincorporated community in Rappahannock County
