= Knockemstiff, Ohio =

Unincorporated area

- Unincorporated community
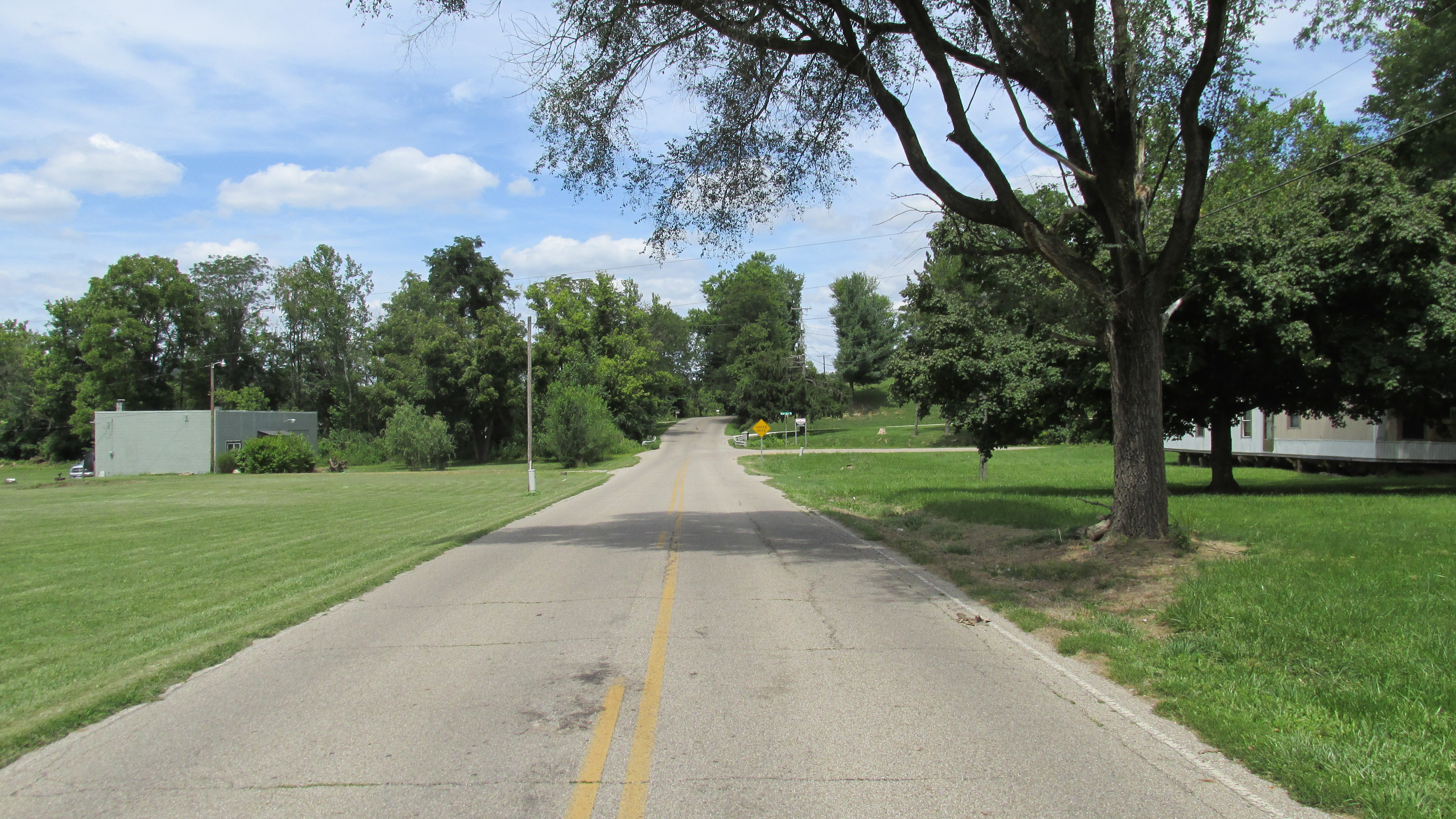
- Junction of Black Run Road and Shady Glen Road in Knockemstiff, Ohio

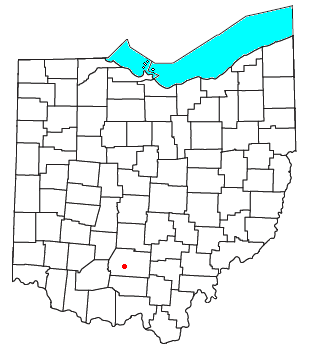
- Location of Knockemstiff, Ohio
- Coordinates: 39.267843°N 83.119073°W
- Country: United States
- State: Ohio
- County: Ross
- Township: Huntington
- Elevation: 692 ft (211 m)

Population (2008)
  - Total: ~ 200
- Time zone: UTC-5 (Eastern (EST))
  - Summer (DST): UTC-4 (EDT)

Knockemstiff, also known as "Glenn Shade" or "Shady Glenn", is an unincorporated area located in northeastern Huntington Township, Ross County, Ohio, United States, to the southwest of Chillicothe.

== History ==
A number of stories exist to explain the community's unusual name. One claims that a tremendous brawl broke out when the community was in its infancy. More humorous is the tale of a woman who confronted her preacher during a Sunday morning worship service, informing the clergyman that her husband was cheating on her. She wanted the preacher's advice, and his response was straightforward: "Knock 'em stiff". A variant of the story is that a preacher came across two women fighting over a man, and advised the women that the man was not likely to be worth their trouble and that someone should "knock him stiff". Another explanation is that it was named from one of the many slang terms used for moonshine. Local residents say that moonshining was formerly common in the area surrounding the community, which had a reputation for rowdiness.

== Geography ==
Knockemstiff sits at an elevation of 692 feet (211 m). The Geographic Names Information System gives Knockemstiff's coordinates as 39°16′04″ N, 83°07′09″ W, placing the original hamlet at the junction of Black Run Road (County Road 156) and Shady Glen Road. A number of more recent rural residences now occupy the same area.

== In popular culture ==
The community's name is also the title of a collection of short stories written by Ross County native Donald Ray Pollock.

Part of the movie The Devil All the Time, based on Pollock's book of the same name, is set in Knockemstiff.
