= Tuson =

Tuson is a surname of British origin. It may refer to:

- Chris Tuson (born 1988), British rugby league player
- Henry Tuson (1836–1916), British general
- John Tuson Bennett (1937–2013), Australian lawyer

== See also ==
- Tucson, Arizona
- Tucson (disambiguation)
