= Mooresville, Ohio =

Unincorporated community in Ohio, U.S.

Coordinates: 39°19′40″N 82°51′05″W

Mooresville is an unincorporated community in Ross County, in the U.S. state of Ohio.

== History ==
The community has the name of the Moore family, first settlers at the town site. A post office called Mooresville was established in 1857, and discontinued in 1858. The post office later was known as Halltown. The Halltown post office operated from 1889 until 1902.
