= Job E. Stevenson =

American politician

Job Stevenson
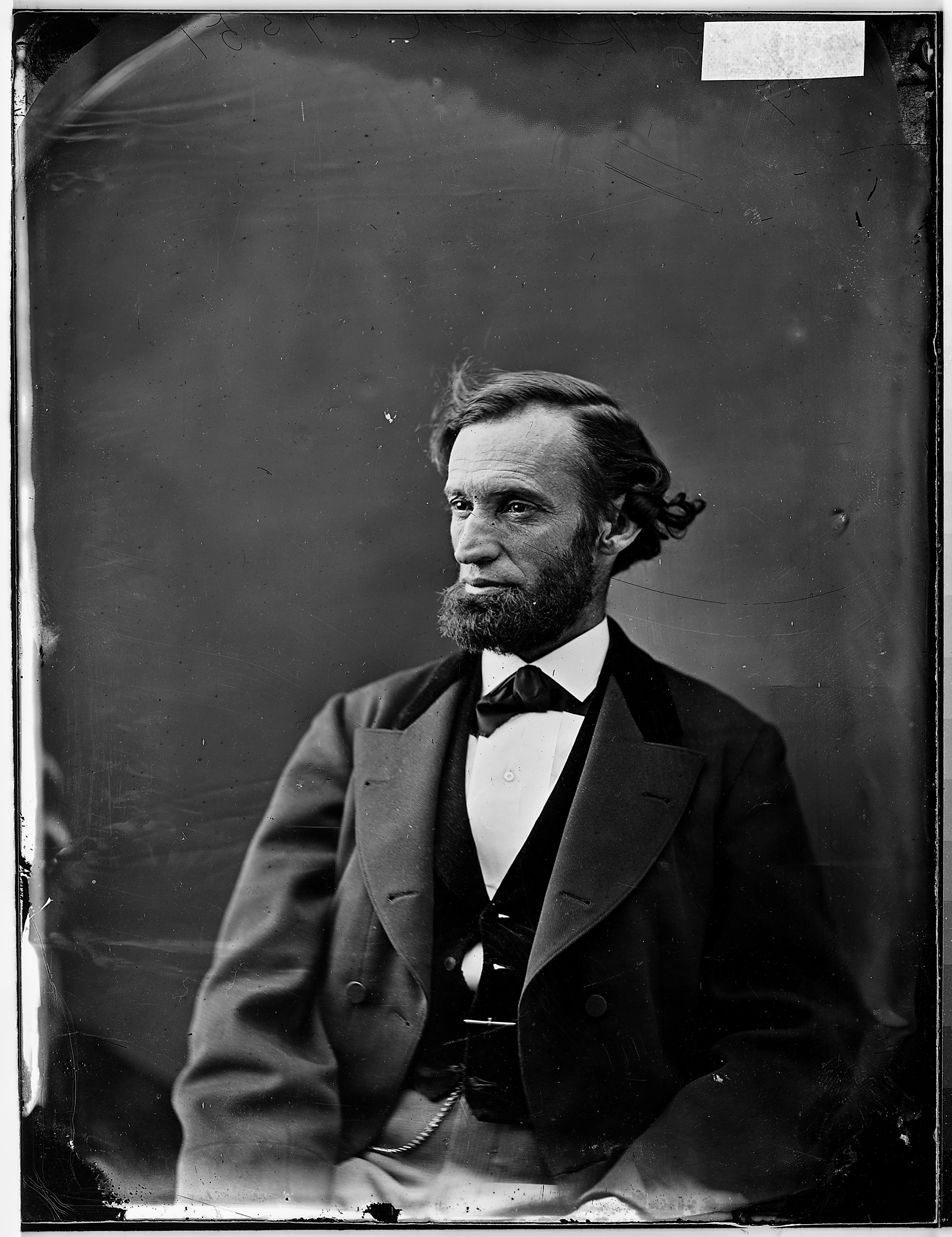
- This is possibly Stevenson

Member of the U.S. House of Representatives from Ohio's 2nd district
- In office March 4, 1869 – March 3, 1873
- Preceded by: Samuel Fenton Cary
- Succeeded by: Henry B. Banning

Member of the Ohio Senate from the 6th district
- In office January 4, 1864 – December 31, 1865
- Preceded by: George W. Ruby
- Succeeded by: Silas Irion

Personal details
- Born: Job Evans Stevenson; February 10, 1832 Yellow Bud, Ohio, US
- Died: July 24, 1922 (aged 90) Corinth, Kentucky, US
- Resting place: Yellow Bud Cemetery
- Party: Republican

Job Evans Stevenson (February 10, 1832 – July 24, 1922) was an American lawyer and politician who served two terms as a U.S. representative from Ohio from 1869 to 1873, as a member of the Republican Party. He also served in the Ohio State Senate from 1864 to 1865.

== Early life and career ==
Born in Yellow Bud, Ohio, Stevenson completed preparatory studies. He studied law. He was admitted to the bar and commenced the practice of his profession in Chillicothe, Ohio. He also engaged in agricultural pursuits.

=== Early political career ===
He served as member of the Ohio Senate from 1863 to 1865. He served as solicitor of Chillicothe from 1859 to 1862. He was an unsuccessful candidate for election in 1864 to the Thirty-ninth Congress.

He moved to Cincinnati, Ohio, in 1865.

== Congress ==
He was elected as a Republican to the Forty-first and Forty-second Congresses from March 4, 1869 to March 3, 1873).

== Later career and death ==
He resumed the practice of law in Cincinnati, Ohio. Resided in Lexington and Corinth, Kentucky.

He died in Corinth, Kentucky, July 24, 1922. He was interred in Yellow Bud Cemetery, Yellow Bud, Ohio.

== Sources ==
- United States Congress. "Job E. Stevenson (id: S000893)". Biographical Directory of the United States Congress.

U.S. House of Representatives
Preceded by Samuel F. Cary	Member of the U.S. House of Representatives from Ohio's 2nd congressional district March 4, 1869 – March 3, 1873	Succeeded by Henry B. Banning
