= 121st Ohio Infantry Regiment =

- Active: September 11, 1862, to June 8, 1865
- Country: United States
- Allegiance: Union
- Branch: Infantry
- Engagements: Defense of Cincinnati; Battle of Perryville; Tullahoma Campaign; Battle of Chickamauga; Siege of Chattanooga; Battle of Lookout Mountain; Battle of Missionary Ridge; Atlanta campaign; Battle of Resaca; Battle of Kennesaw Mountain; Battle of Peachtree Creek; Siege of Atlanta; Battle of Jonesboro; Sherman's March to the Sea; Carolinas campaign; Battle of Bentonville

The 121st Ohio Infantry Regiment, sometimes 121st Ohio Volunteer Infantry (or 121st OVI) was an infantry regiment in the Union Army during the American Civil War.

== Service ==
The 121st Ohio Infantry was organized at Delaware, Ohio, and mustered in for three years service on September 11, 1862, under the command of Colonel William P. Reid. The regiment was recruited in Delaware, Knox, Logan, Union, Marion, and Morrow counties.

The regiment was attached to 34th Brigade, 10th Division, Army of the Ohio, September 1862. 34th Brigade, 10th Division, I Corps, Army of the Ohio, to November 1862. District of West Kentucky, Department of the Ohio, to February 1863. Reed's Brigade, Baird's Division, Army of Kentucky, Department of the Cumberland, to June 1863. 2nd Brigade, 1st Division, Reserve Corps, Army of the Cumberland, to October 1863. 2nd Brigade, 2nd Division, XIV Corps, Army of the Cumberland, to June 1865.

The 121st Ohio Infantry mustered out of service at Washington, D.C. on June 8, 1865.

== Detailed service ==
Ordered to Cincinnati, September 11; thence to Covington, Ky., September 15, and to Louisville, Ky., September 20. Pursuit of Bragg into Kentucky October 1–15, 1862. Battle of Perryville, Ky., October 8. Moved to Lebanon, Ky., and duty there until November, and at Columbia until December. Operations against Morgan December 22, 1862, to January 3, 1863. Ordered to Louisville, thence moved to Nashville, Tenn., February 9; thence to Franklin, Tenn., February 12, and duty there until June. Tullahoma Campaign June 23-July 7. Duty at Fayetteville August 25-September 5. Chickamauga Campaign. Battle of Chickamauga September 19–21. Siege of Chattanooga, September 24-November 23. Chattanooga-Ringgold Campaign November 23–27. Orchard Knob November 23. Tunnel Hill November 24–25. Missionary Ridge November 25. Chickamauga Station November 26. March to relief of Knoxville, November 28-December 17. Duty at Rossville, Ga., until May 1864. Atlanta Campaign May 1 to September 8. Tunnel Hill May 6–7. Demonstration on Rocky Faced Ridge May 8–11. Buzzard's Roost Gap May 8–9. Battle of Resaca May 14–15. Advance on Dallas May 18–25. Operations on line of Pumpkin Vine Creek and battles about Dallas, New Hope Church and Allatoona Hills May 25-June 5. Operations about Marietta and against Kennesaw Mountain June 10-July 2. Pine Hill June 11–14. Lost Mountain June 15–17. Assault on Kennesaw June 27. Ruff's Station July 4. Chattahoochie River July 5–17. Peachtree Creek July 19–20. Siege of Atlanta July 22-August 25. Utoy Creek August 5–7. Flank movement on Jonesboro August 25–30. Battle of Jonesboro August 31-September 1. Operations against Forrest and Hood in northern Georgia and northern Alabama September 29-November 3. March to the Sea November 15-December 10. Sandersville November 26. Siege of Savannah December 10–21. Campaign of the Carolinas January to April 1865. Taylor's Hole Creek, Aversyboro, N. C., March 16. Battle of Bentonville March 19–21. Occupation of Goldsboro March 24. Advance on Raleigh April 10–14. Occupation of Raleigh April 14. Bennett's House April 26. Surrender of Johnston and his army. March to Washington, D.C., via Richmond, Va., April 29-May 19. Grand Review of the Armies May 24.

== Casualties ==
The regiment lost a total of 349 men during service; 9 officers and 92 enlisted men killed or mortally wounded, 2 officers and 246 enlisted men died of disease.

== Commanders ==
- Colonel William P. Reid
- Colonel Henry Blackstone Banning - commanded at the battle of Chickamauga as lieutenant colonel; promoted from lieutenant colonel November 10, 1863

== See also ==
- List of Ohio Civil War units
- Ohio in the Civil War
