= Donald Ray Pollock =

American writer (born 1954)

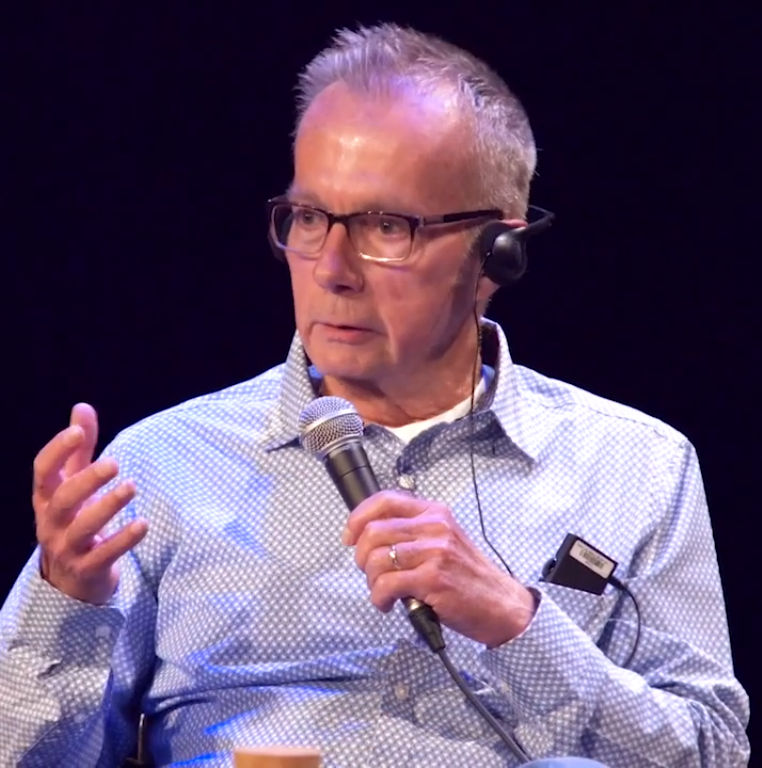
- Donald Ray Pollock in FOLIO - Óbidos International Literary Festival, 2019
- Born: December 23, 1954 (age 71); Ross County, Ohio, U.S.
- Education: Ohio University
- Children: Amber Pollock (Daughter)
- Writing career
- Language: English
- Genres: Gothic, crime

Donald Ray Pollock (born December 23, 1954) is an American writer. He first published his collection of short stories, Knockemstiff, in 2008, based on his experiences growing up in Knockemstiff, Ohio. His debut novel, The Devil All the Time, was published in 2011 to critical acclaim. Pollock served as the narrator of the film adaptation in 2020.

== Biography ==
Born in 1954 and raised in Knockemstiff, Ohio, Pollock has lived his entire adult life in Chillicothe, Ohio, where he worked at the Mead Paper Mill as a laborer and truck driver until age 50. He is a graduate of the Chillicothe branch campus of Ohio University. While there, Pollock published his debut short story collection, Knockemstiff, and the New York Times regularly posted his election dispatches from southern Ohio throughout the 2008 campaign. The Devil All the Time, his first novel, was published in 2011. His work has appeared in various literary journals, including Epoch, Sou'wester, Granta, Third Coast, River Styx, The Journal, Boulevard, Tin House, and PEN America. His latest book, a novel called The Heavenly Table, was published by Doubleday on July 12, 2016. It was awarded first place in the International category of the Deutscher Krimi Preis in January, 2017.

== Reception ==
Pollock's fiction has been referred to as "Hillbilly Gothic" and "Southern Ohio Gothic," and has received positive reviews from critics. Knockemstiff was awarded the PEN/Robert Bingham Prize, and has been published in France, Germany, the Netherlands, Spain, Italy, and England. Discussing The Devil All The Time, Vick Mickunas wrote in The Washington Independent Review of Books that "... there’s an otherness to Pollock’s characters that this reviewer finds strangely compelling. We might not be able to relate to the violence, but we comprehend the humanity — the flaws, the deceits, the crushed dreams, the hope that rises like a delicate flower from ashes." On the other hand, Josh Ritter, an Americana folk singer who reviewed the novel for the New York Times Book Review, was somewhat put off by the violence, but did speak highly of the prose. As of 2015, the book has been translated into twenty-one languages.

== Awards and honors ==
- 2009 PEN/Robert W. Bingham Prize, Knockemstiff, winner
- 2009 Devil's Kitchen Award in Prose (English Department of Southern Illinois University Carbondale), Knockemstiff
- 2012 Publishers Weekly Top Ten Books of the Year, The Devil All The Time
- 2012 Guggenheim Fellowship
- 2012 Thomas and Lillie D. Chaffin Award for Appalachian Writing (for The Devil All the Time)
- 2012 Grand Prix de Littérature Policière (French award for The Devil All the Time)
- 2013 Third Place International Category Deutscher Krimi Preis (German award for The Devil All the Time')
- 2013 First Place Prix Mystère de la critique (for The Devil All the Time) (France)
- 2017 First Place International Category Deutscher Krimi Preis for The Heavenly Table (Germany)

== Bibliography ==
- Knockemstiff (2008)
- The Devil All the Time (2011)
- The Heavenly Table (2016)
