= Andersonville, Ohio =

- CDP
- Interactive map of Andersonville, Ohio
- Coordinates: 39°26′02″N 83°01′08″W
- Country: United States
- State: Ohio
- County: Ross
- Elevation: 719 ft (219 m)

Population (2020)
  - Total: 778
- Time zone: UTC-5 (Eastern (EST))
  - Summer (DST): UTC-4 (EDT)
- GNIS feature ID: 2584360

Andersonville is a census-designated place in Ross County, in the U.S. state of Ohio. The population of the CDP was 778 at the 2020 census.

== History ==
Andersonville was originally called Lewisville, and under the latter name was laid out in 1851 by Mahlon Anderson. A post office called Andersonville was established in 1873, and remained in operation until 1901. The community was a port town on the Ohio and Erie Canal.
