= Esther T. Housh =

American social reformer and editor (1840–1898)

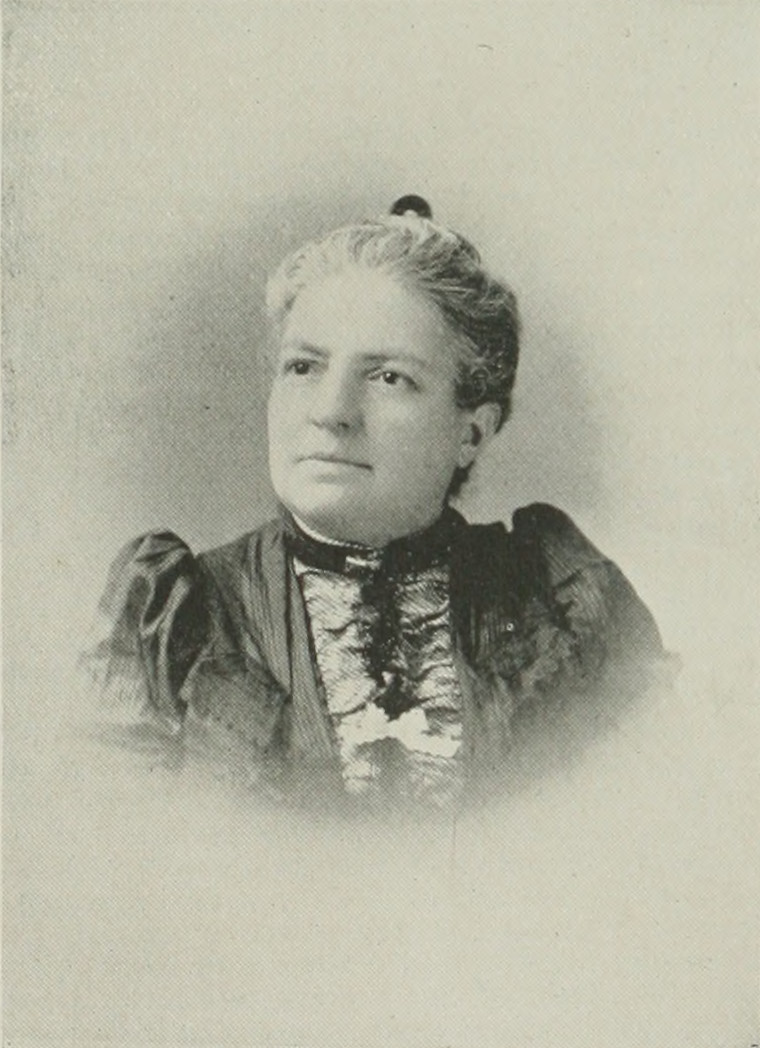
- Portrait photo from "A Woman of the Century"
- Born: Esther Caroline Taylor; October 27, 1840; Ross County, Ohio, U.S.
- Died: May 7, 1898 (aged 57); Boston, Massachusetts, U.S.
- Resting place: Lindenwood Cemetery, Fort Wayne, Indiana, U.S.
- Occupations: temperance leader; editor; author
- Known for: President, Vermont WCTU; Press superintendent, National WCTU
- Spouse: Frank Housh
- Children: 2

Esther T. Housh (née, Taylor; October 27, 1840 – May 7, 1898) was a 19th-century American social reformer, author, and newspaper editor. She was the President of the Vermont State Woman's Christian Temperance Union (WCTU). While serving as press superintendent of the National WCTU, she instituted the National Bulletin. She was the editor of The Woman's Magazine, as well as the author of many temperance leaflets, and poems.

== Early life and education ==
Esther Caroline Taylor was born in Ross County, Ohio, October 27, 1840. She was descended from Scotch and English ancestors. Her grandfather was Col. Robert Stewart, of Ohio, whose home was a station on the Underground Railroad. Her grandmother was the first one of the family to sign the Washingtonian pledge. Her father was a Congregational church minister. Her parents were Isaac Newton Taylor and Margaretta Stewart Taylor. Housh was the second child in a family of eight, and her early days were full of responsibilities. Among her siblings were two brothers, Charles N. Taylor and Robert S. Taylor.

In childhood, she became a believer in woman's rights. She received a liberal education, studying Greek and Latin while busy with the work associated with home.

== Career ==
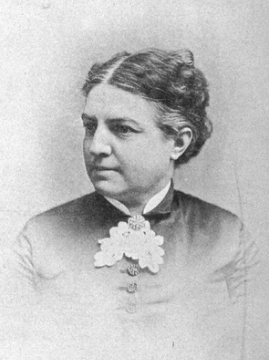
Esther Housh, 1888

At an early age, she married Frank Housh at her grandfather's home, near Champaign, Illinois. He was the publisher of The Woman's Magazine, and she was the editor. They had two children, one of whom died in childhood. The Woman's Century commenced publication in Louisville, Kentucky in 1877, and was continued by Housh in Brattleboro, Vermont, until 1890.

Housh became prominent in the temperance movement. In 1883, she was sent from Brattleboro as a delegate to the Vermont state convention in Randolph, Vermont. She was invited to attend the national convention in Detroit, Michigan, and there, she was elected national press superintendent of the WCTU. She held that position until 1888. She instituted the National Bulletin, which averaged 80,000 copies a year. She wrote special reports and numerous leaflets, some of which reached a sale of 200,000 copies. In the national conventions in Nashville, Tennessee and New York City, she furnished a report to a thousand selected papers. In 1885, she was elected State secretary of the Vermont WCTU, and thereafter had editorial charge of Our Home Guards, the State organ. In 1877, she was elected President of the Vermont State WCTU.

In 1890 and 1891, in Boston, Massachusetts, she edited the Household, which had shifted from Brattleboro. In 1891, she returned to Brattleboro. In 1892, she removed again to Boston to assist on the Household, and subsequently became editor of Our message, the organ of the Massachusetts WCTU. In 1894, she was elected corresponding secretary of the Massachusetts WCTU. She also did literary work while in Boston.

== Death ==
Housh died in Boston, May 7, 1898. Interment was at Lindenwood Cemetery, Fort Wayne, Indiana.
