= Alma, Ohio =

Unincorporated community in Ohio, U.S.

Coordinates: 39°11′17″N 82°58′44″W

Alma is an unincorporated community in Ross County, in the U.S. state of Ohio.

== History ==
A post office called Alma was established in 1869, and remained in operation until 1904. An early variant name was "Pleasant Valley".
