= Lyndon, Ohio =

Unincorporated community in Ohio, U.S.

Coordinates: 39°21′09″N 83°18′44″W

Lyndon is an unincorporated community in Ross County, in the U.S. state of Ohio.

== History ==
Lyndon was originally called "Zora", and under the latter name was platted in 1853. The present name is after Lyndon, Massachusetts, the native home of an early settler. A former variant name was Lyndon Station. A post office called Lyndon Station was established in 1857, and the name was changed to Lyndon in 1882. Lyndon Station was located on the Marietta and Cincinnati Railroad.
