= Harper, Ross County, Ohio =

Unincorporated community in Ohio, U.S.

Coordinates: 39°21′53″N 83°15′42″W

Harper is an unincorporated community in Ross County, in the U.S. state of Ohio.

== History ==
A former variant name was Harpers Station. The namesake Harper's Station depot was located on the Marietta and Cincinnati Railroad. A post office called Harpers Station was established in 1867, and remained in operation until 1927.
