= Pride, Ohio =

Unincorporated community in Ohio, U.S.

Coordinates: 39°14′01″N 82°53′45″W

Pride is an unincorporated community in Ross County, in the U.S. state of Ohio.

== History ==
A post office called Pride was established in 1891, and remained in operation until 1929. Besides the post office, Pride had a large orchard called the Pride Fruit Farm.
