= Henry B. Banning =

American politician

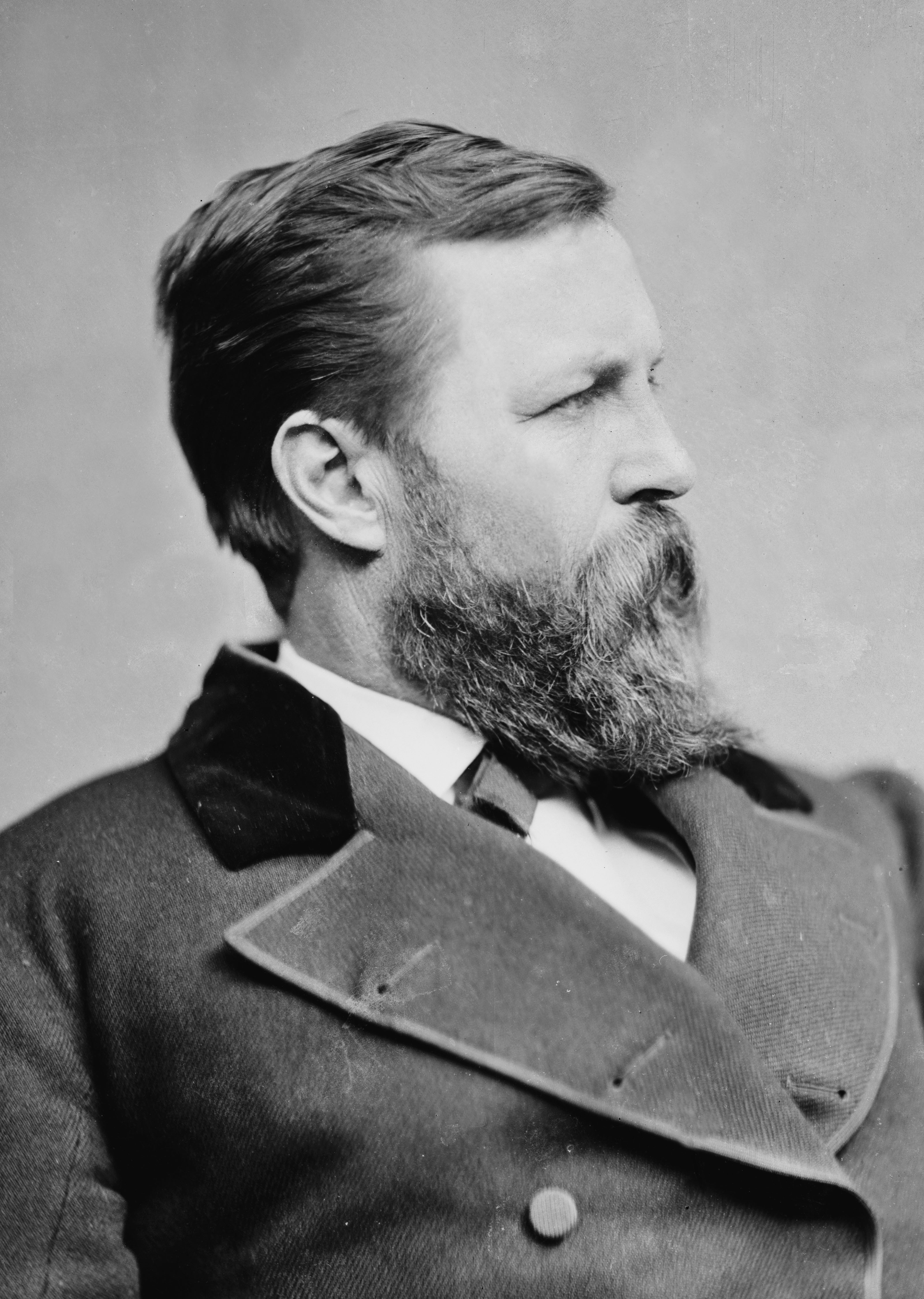
- Banning, c. 1870–1880

Member of the U.S. House of Representatives from Ohio's 2nd district
- In office March 4, 1873 – March 3, 1879
- Preceded by: Job E. Stevenson
- Succeeded by: Thomas L. Young

Member of the Ohio House of Representatives from the Knox County district
- In office January 1, 1866 – January 5, 1868
- Preceded by: Columbus Delano
- Succeeded by: Robert Hoffett

Personal details
- Born: Henry Blackstone Banning; November 10, 1836 Bannings Mills, Ohio, U.S.
- Died: December 10, 1881 (aged 45) Cincinnati, Ohio, U.S.
- Resting place: Spring Grove Cemetery, Cincinnati, Ohio
- Party: Democratic, Independent Republican
- Spouse: Ida Kirby
- Children: four
- Education: Mount Vernon Academy; Kenyon College

Military service
- Allegiance: United States of America; Union
- Branch/service: United States Army; Union Army
- Years of service: 1861–1865
- Rank: Colonel; Brevet Major General
- Commands: 87th Ohio Infantry; 121st Ohio Infantry
- Battles/wars: See list: American Civil War; Battle of Rich Mountain; Battle of Romney; Battle of Blue Gap; Jackson's Valley campaign; First Battle of Winchester; Battle of Cross Keys; Battle of Chickamauga; Atlanta campaign; Battle of Rocky Face Ridge; Battle of Resaca; Battle of Rome Cross Roads; Battle of Dallas; Battle of Kennesaw Mountain; Battle of Peachtree Creek; Battle of Jonesborough; Battle of Nashville

Henry Blackstone Banning (November 10, 1836 – December 10, 1881) was an American lawyer and three-term U.S. representative from Ohio, as well as an infantry officer in the Union Army during the American Civil War.

== Early life and career ==
Born in Bannings Mills, Ohio, Banning attended the Clinton district school, Mount Vernon Academy, and Kenyon College, Gambier, Ohio, where he stayed a short time before returning to Mount Vernon to study law in the office of Hosmer, Curtis & Devin. He was admitted to the bar in 1857 and commenced practice in Mount Vernon, Ohio.

In 1868 he married Ida Kirby of Cincinnati, and had four children.

== Civil War service ==
With the outbreak of the Civil War, he enlisted in April 1861 in the Union Army as a private. He was commissioned as a captain in Company B of the 4th Ohio Infantry, on June 5, 1861. He served as colonel of the 87th Ohio Infantry (a three-month regiment), June 10-September 20, 1862.

Banning was honorably mustered out October 4, 1862. He reenlisted and was commissioned lieutenant colonel of the 125th Ohio Infantry on January 1, 1863. He transferred to the 121st Ohio Infantry on April 5, 1863, being promoted to colonel of that regiment on November 10, 1863. He took part in the battles of Rich Mountain, Romney, Blue Gap, Winchester, Cross Keys, Chickamauga, Buzzard's Roost, Resaca, Rome, Kennesaw Mountain, Dallas, Peachtree Creek, Jonesboro, and Nashville.

== Postbellum career ==
He resigned from the army on January 21, 1865, to return home to Ohio. On January 16, 1866, President Andrew Johnson nominated Banning for appointment to the grade of brevet brigadier general of volunteers, to rank from March 13, 1865, and the U.S. Senate confirmed the appointment on March 12, 1866. On February 21, 1866, President Andrew Johnson nominated Banning for appointment to the grade of brevet major general of volunteers, to rank from March 13, 1865, and the U.S. Senate confirmed the appointment on April 26, 1866.

Banning served as member of the State House of Representatives in 1866 and 1867. He moved to Cincinnati, in 1869 and resumed the practice of law.

=== Congress ===
He was elected as a Liberal Republican to the Forty-third Congress and as a Democrat to the Forty-fourth Congress and Forty-fifth Congress, serving from (March 4, 1873 until March 3, 1879). He served as chairman of the Committee on Military Affairs in the Forty-fourth and Forty-fifth Congresses.

He was an unsuccessful candidate for renomination in 1878 to the Forty-sixth Congress, and for election in 1880 to the Forty-seventh Congress. He then returned to his legal practice in Cincinnati.

== Death and burial ==
Henry Banning died in Cincinnati on December 10, 1881. He was interred in Spring Grove Cemetery. He is buried not far from his brother-in-law, fellow former Civil War general Byron Kirby.

== Namesake ==
Camp 207, Ohio Sons of Union Veterans, was founded in 1903 and named in General Banning's honor and memory. It is still active in Mount Vernon, Ohio.

Banning was inducted to the Ohio Veteran's Hall of Fame in November 2004 by Ohio Governor Bob Taft. The Hall of Fame recognizes Buckeyes who continue to contribute to their community, state, and nation after their military service.

== See also ==
- List of American Civil War brevet generals (Union)
- List of Ohio's American Civil War generals
- Ohio in the American Civil War

== Notes ==
U.S. House of Representatives
Preceded by Job E. Stevenson	Member of the U.S. House of Representatives from Ohio's 2nd congressional district March 4, 1873 – March 3, 1879	Succeeded by Thomas L. Young
