= Spargursville, Ohio =

Unincorporated community in Ohio, U.S.

Coordinates: 39°13′31″N 83°10′02″W

Spargursville is an unincorporated community in Ross County, in the U.S. state of Ohio.

== History ==
A post office called Spargursville was established in 1901, and remained in operation until 1955. The community was named after a pioneer citizen.
