= Kinnikinnick, Ohio =

- Unincorporated community
- Location within Ohio Location within the United States
- Coordinates: 39°25′33″N 82°57′10″W
- Country: United States
- State: Ohio
- County: Ross
- Elevation: 666 ft (203 m)
- Time zone: UTC-5 (Eastern (EST))
  - Summer (DST): UTC-4 (EDT)
- Area code: 740
- GNIS feature ID: 1058188

Kinnikinnick is an unincorporated community in Ross County, Ohio, United States. Kinnikinnick is located at the junction of Ohio State Route 159 and Ohio State Route 180, 16.6 miles (26.7 km) north-northeast of Chillicothe.

== History ==
A post office called Kinnikinnick was established in 1878, and remained in operation until 1910. The community takes its name from Kinnikinnick Creek, which the community is located on.

== Gallery ==
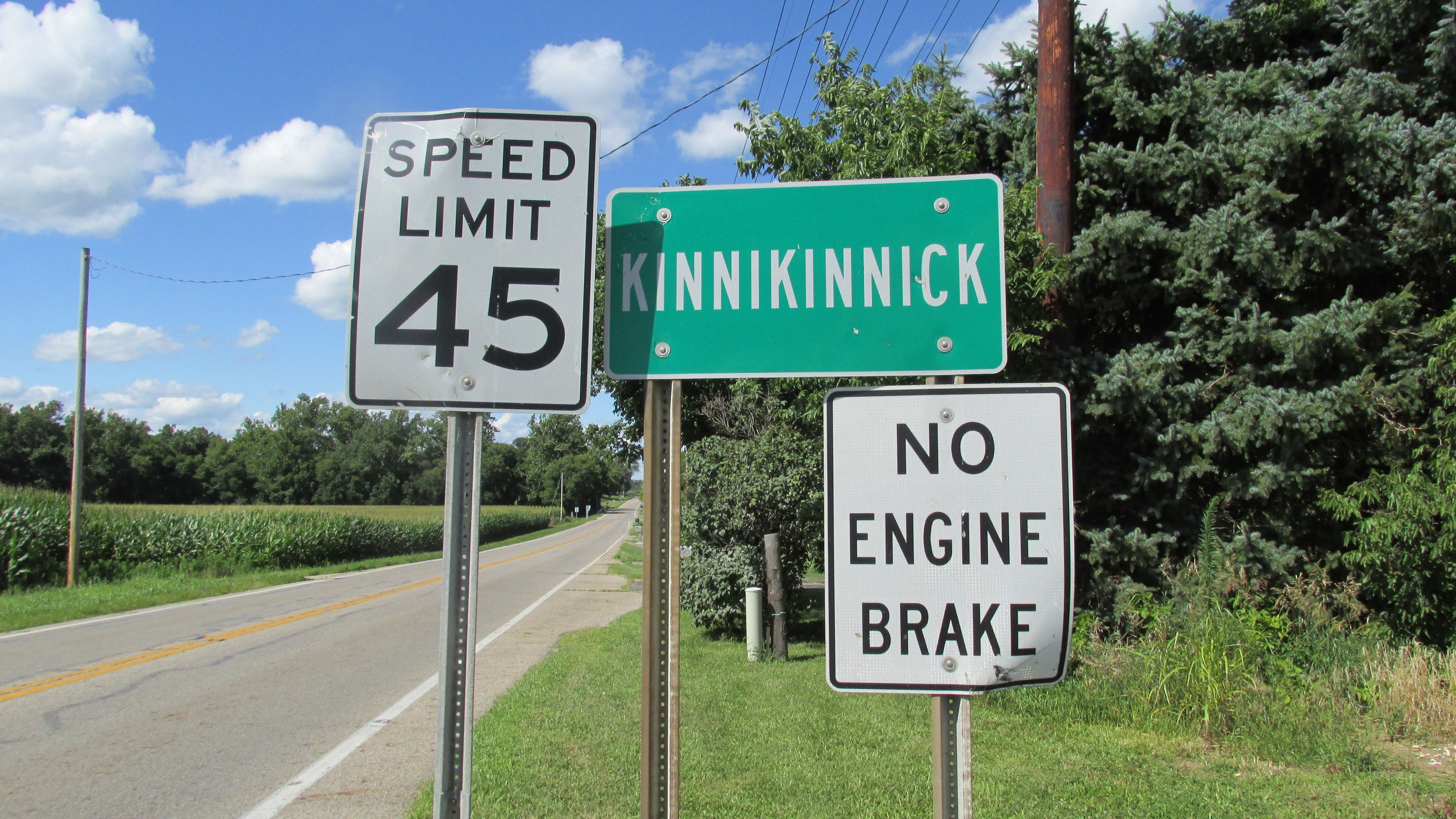
Kinnikinnick community sign.

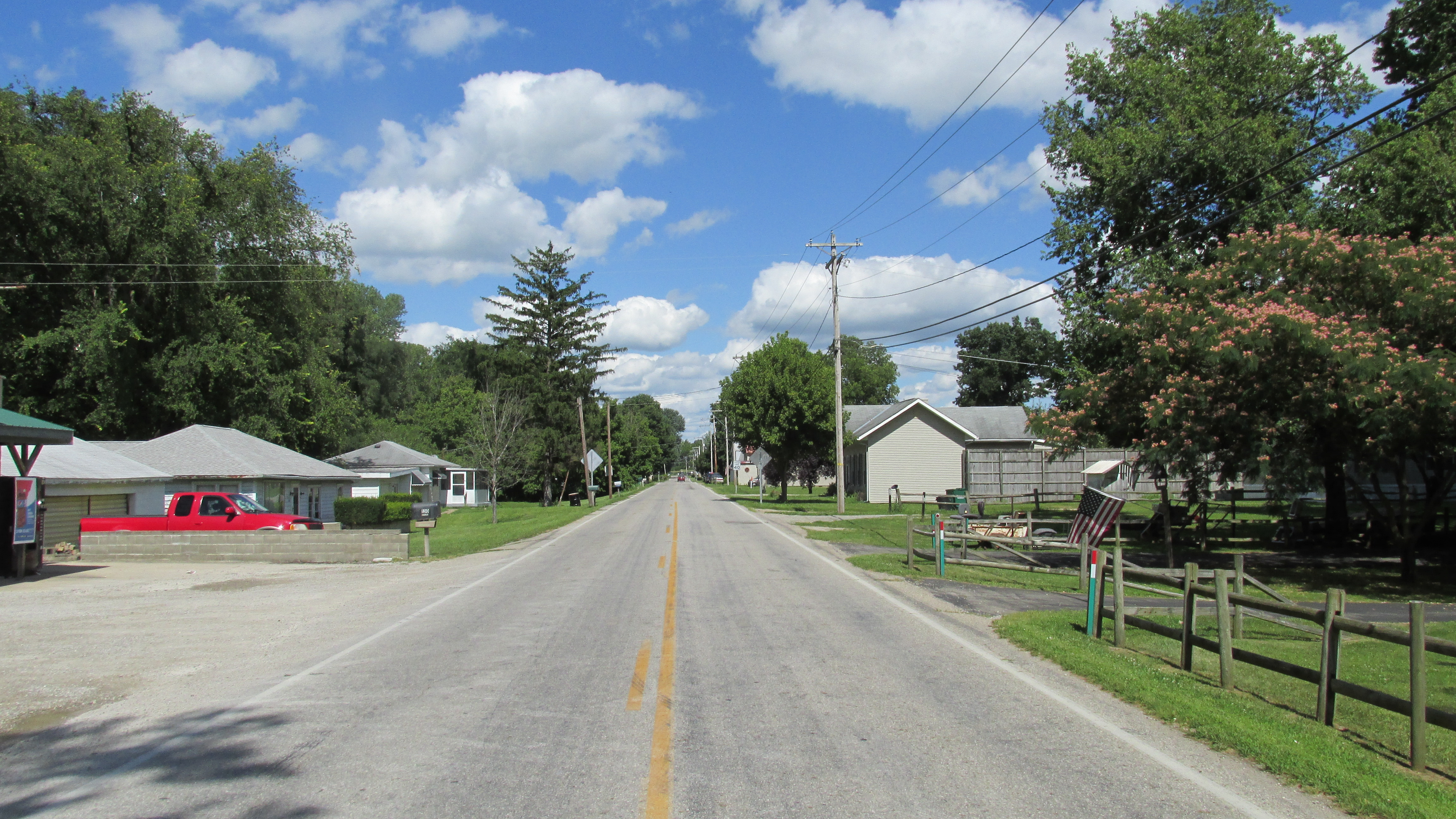
Looking east on Ohio Highway 180 in Kinnikinnick.
