= Storms, Ohio =

Unincorporated community in Ohio, U.S.

Coordinates: 39°14′16″N 83°10′56″W

Storms is an unincorporated community in Ross County, in the U.S. state of Ohio.

== History ==
The first settlement at Storms was made in 1802. A post office called Storms was established in 1887, and remained in operation until 1940. The community was named after John Storms, the grandfather of the town merchant.
