= Lattaville, Ohio =

Unincorporated community in Ohio, U.S.

Coordinates: 39°20′53″N 83°12′23″W

Lattaville is an unincorporated community in Ross County, in the U.S. state of Ohio.

== History ==
Variant names were "Lattas" and "Lattasville". A post office called Lattas was established in 1833, and remained in operation until 1903. The community has the name of a pioneer citizen.
