= Thrifton, Ohio =

Unincorporated community in Ohio, U.S.

Coordinates: 39°20′36″N 83°22′01″W

Thrifton is an unincorporated community in Ross County, in the U.S. state of Ohio.

== History ==
Thrifton was founded when the railroad was extended through the neighborhood. A post office called Thrifton was established in 1889, and remained in operation until 1891.
