= Anderson, Ohio =

Unincorporated community in Ohio, U.S.

Coordinates: 39°21′42″N 83°4′14″W

Anderson is an unincorporated community in Ross County, in the U.S. state of Ohio.

== History ==
A post office called Anderson was established in 1862, and remained in operation until 1929. Besides the post office, Anderson had a station on the Cincinnati, Hamilton and Dayton Railroad.
