= Mount Vernon Academy =

Location
- 525 Wooster Road; Mount Vernon, (Knox County), Ohio 43050; United States; 40°24′52″N 82°28′9″W

Information
- Type: Private, co-ed, college preparatory, boarding, Christian
- Motto: Mens, Spiritus, Corpus. Fiat lux. (Mind, Spirit, Body. Let there be light.)
- Religious affiliation: Seventh-day Adventist Church
- Established: 1893
- Closed: 2015
- Grades: 9-12
- Campus type: Rural
- Colors: Red and White
- Song: "Alma Mater"
- Fight song: "Good Old MVA"
- Nickname: MVA, The Academy
- Team name: Eagles
- Accreditation: North Central Association of Colleges and Schools
- Yearbook: Treasure Chest
- Website: https://web.archive.org/web/20150627010640/http://www.mvacademy.org:80/

Mount Vernon Academy (MVA) was a private Christian boarding high school located in Mount Vernon, Ohio. The school, founded in 1893, was the oldest operating boarding academy of the Seventh-day Adventist Church until its closing in 2015. It was a part of the Seventh-day Adventist education system, the world's second largest Christian school system.

== History ==
The oldest boarding academy of the Seventh-day Adventist Church, Mount Vernon Academy opened its doors in 1893 to 32 students and six staff members with Professor William T. Bland as principal. By the end of the first year the enrollment had grown to about 100. The school opened in buildings previously occupied by the Mount Vernon Sanitarium, which had closed in 1891. Ellen G. White, when consulted, had written in 1893:

"Let the building be converted into a seminary to educate our youth in the place of enlarging the college at Battle Creek. I have been shown that there should...be located, school buildings in Ohio which would give character to the work" (Ellen G. White letter K35).

The day after this letter was written, J. N. Loughborough submitted a report to the General Conference in session advising the same action. Upon General Conference recommendations, the stockholders of the sanitarium voted to adopt this recommendation and to form a new corporation for the management of the Academy.

After operating on the secondary level for 12 years, the school was advanced from an academy to a college. During the next 11 years, Mount Vernon College offered four-year courses leading to B.S. and B.A. degrees. Secondary work also continued during this time. Norris W. Lawrence served as the first president of the college. In 1914 the Washington Foreign Mission Seminary at Washington, D.C. (now known as Washington Adventist University), was made the training college for the Columbia Union, and the school at Mount Vernon reverted to an academy.

The Administration Building was built in 1924 and housed the chapel, three classrooms, and the administrative offices. On December 24, 1926, the old sanitarium building, which was the main campus building for many years, was destroyed by fire. A partial replacement, Linden Hall, the girls' dormitory, was erected in 1927-1928. In 1940, Hadley Hall, the boys' dormitory, was built, along with additions built onto the Linden Hall. The gymnasium was completed in 1951, and in 1958, the industrial arts building. In 1968, Hiawatha Hall, which included the cafeteria, classrooms, and administrative offices, was built. Campus-wide renovations began in 2001, which included redecoration and repairs to the Cafeteria, renovating Linden Hall and Hadley Hall, renovations to the Music Building, a new Campus Center, and repairs on the gymnasium. Over $3.6 million was invested in capital improvements since 2001. Over 7,000 students attended the school during its operation.

=== Closing ===
In October, 2014 it was revealed the school had been severely mismanaging its finances and could not continue to operate. The academy was given 2 months to raise $3 million or shut down. Despite appeals on social media by the principal and the students under the #dosomething campaign, the fundraiser was a failure. Preparations were made for the closure and a scholarship was established to help students continue Adventist education if they so wished. Mount Vernon Academy ceased operations in June, 2015. The property which had 13 buildings across 24 acres plus 227 acres of recreational land, was sold at auction to multiple parties on June 22, 2016 for a total of $1.595 million. Ohio conference president Ron Halvorsen Jr. stated the funds raised would be used to pay some of the academy's outstanding debts and establish an education scholarship.

== Notable alumni ==
- Henry B. Banning

== See also ==
- List of Seventh-day Adventist secondary schools
- Seventh-day Adventist education
