= Yellowbud, Ohio =

Unincorporated community in Ohio, U.S.

Coordinates: 39°30′15″N 83°0′35″W

Yellowbud (sometimes called Yellow Bud) is an unincorporated community in Ross County, in the U.S. state of Ohio.

== History ==
Yellowbud had its start as a shipping point on the Ohio and Erie Canal. The town site was platted in 1845. With the construction of the railroad, business activity shifted away from inland Yellowbud, and the town's population dwindled. A post office called Yellow Bud was established in 1846, the name was changed to Yellowbud in 1895, and the post office closed in 1903. The community takes its name from Yellowbud Creek.

== Notable person ==
Job E. Stevenson, a U.S. Representative from Ohio, was born at Yellowbud in 1832.

== Solar farm ==
In 2023, a 274 MW solar farm began operating in Yellowbud.
