= Austin, Ohio =

Unincorporated community in Ohio, U.S.

Coordinates: 39°26′12″N 83°13′21″W

Austin is an unincorporated community in Ross County, in the U.S. state of Ohio.

== History ==
A post office called Austin was in operation from 1848 until 1933. The community was named after Austin Bush, the proprietor of a local gristmill.
