= Schooley, Ohio =

Unincorporated community in Ohio, U.S.

Coordinates: 39°15′56″N 82°52′12″W

Schooley is an unincorporated community in Ross County, in the U.S. state of Ohio.

== History ==
A variant name for the community was Shooleys Station. A post office called Schooleys Station 1858, the name was changed to Schooley in 1882, and the post office closed in 1906. John Schooley, the first postmaster and station agent, gave the community his name.
