= Denver, Ross County, Ohio =

Denver, Ohio
- Unincorporated community
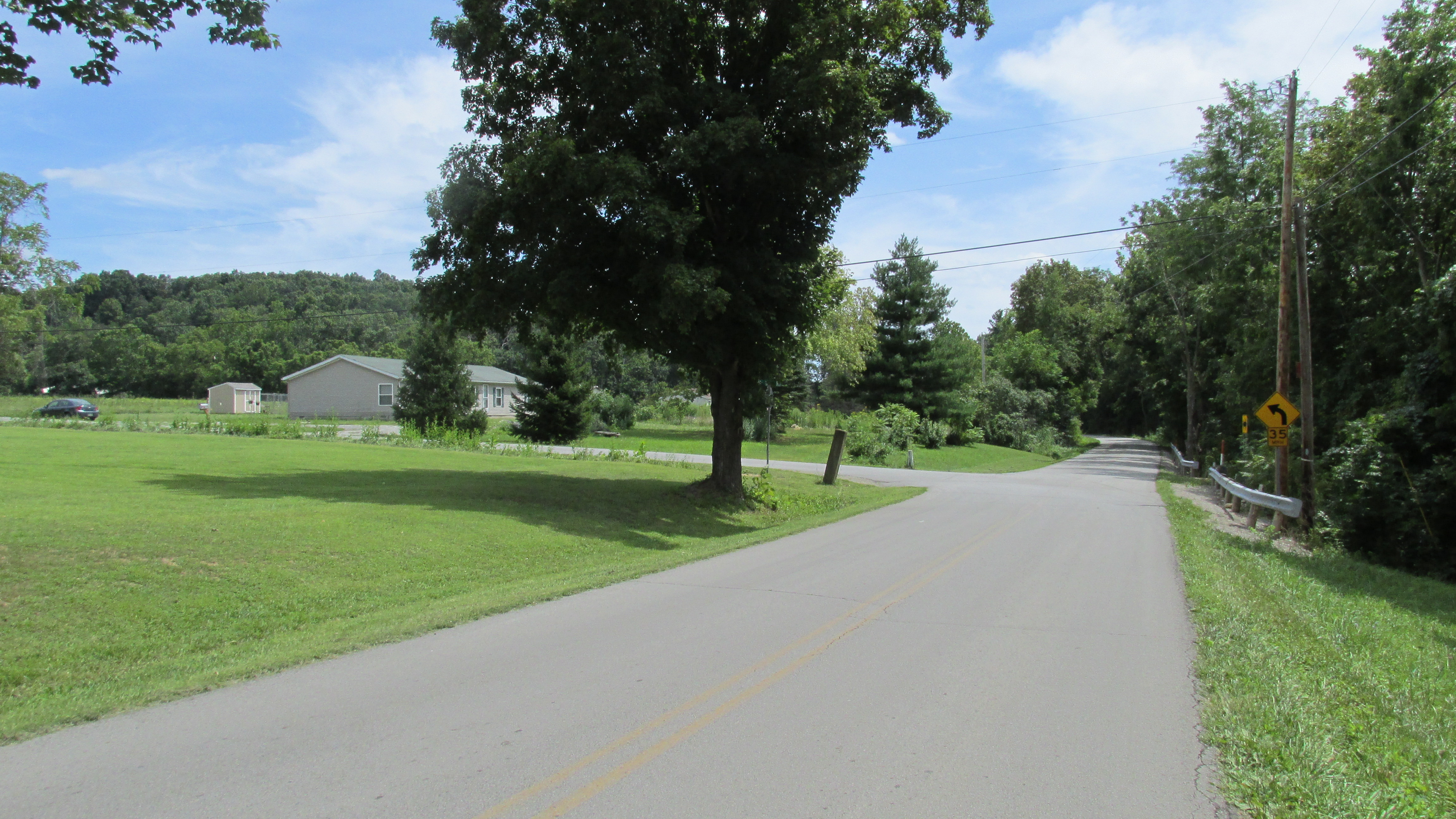
- Junction of Denver Road and Mount Tabor Road in Denver, Ohio.

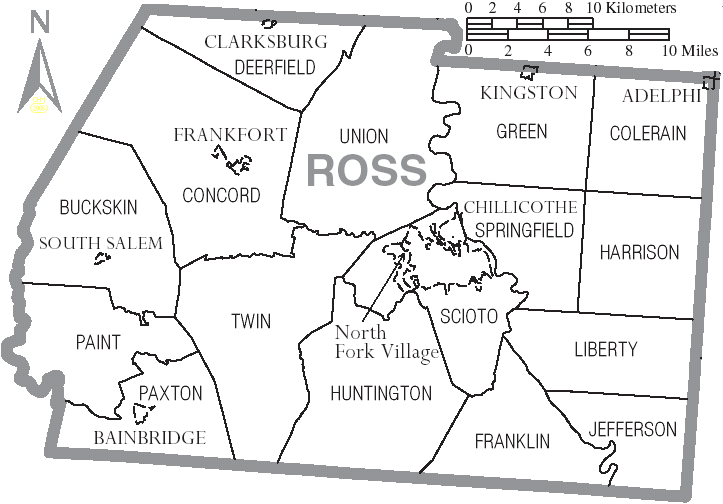
- Location of Huntington Township and Denver within Ross County

- Location of Denver within Ohio
- Coordinates: 39°11′35″N 83°03′21″W
- Country: United States
- State: Ohio
- County: Ross
- Township: Huntington
- Elevation: 827 ft (252 m)
- Time zone: UTC-5 (Eastern)
  - Summer (DST): UTC-4 (Eastern)
- ZIP Code: 45647
- GNIS feature ID: 1064531
- FIPS place code: 21756

Denver is an unincorporated community located in southern Huntington Township, Ross County, Ohio, United States. It is in the south of the county, near the boundary with Pike County.

== History ==
The community's name is a transfer from Denver, Colorado. A post office called Denver was established in 1882, and remained in operation until 1935. Besides the post office, Denver had a country store.
