= Tucson (disambiguation) =

Tucson is a city in the U.S. state of Arizona.

Tucson may also refer to:

- Tucson, Ohio, an unincorporated community
- Hyundai Tucson, an automobile
- FC Tucson
- USS Tucson, several ships
- Tucson (film), a 1949 film
- TusCon, an annual science fiction convention in Tucson, Arizona
