= Greenland, Ohio =

Unincorporated community in Ohio, U.S.

Coordinates: 39°26′42″N 83°07′14″W

Greenland is an unincorporated community in Ross County, in the U.S. state of Ohio.

== History ==
The name "Greenland" was assigned by the railroad company. A post office called Greenland was established in 1860, and remained in operation until 1902. Besides the post office, Greenland had a Presbyterian church.
