= Huntington Township, Ross County, Ohio =

Township in Ohio, US

- Township
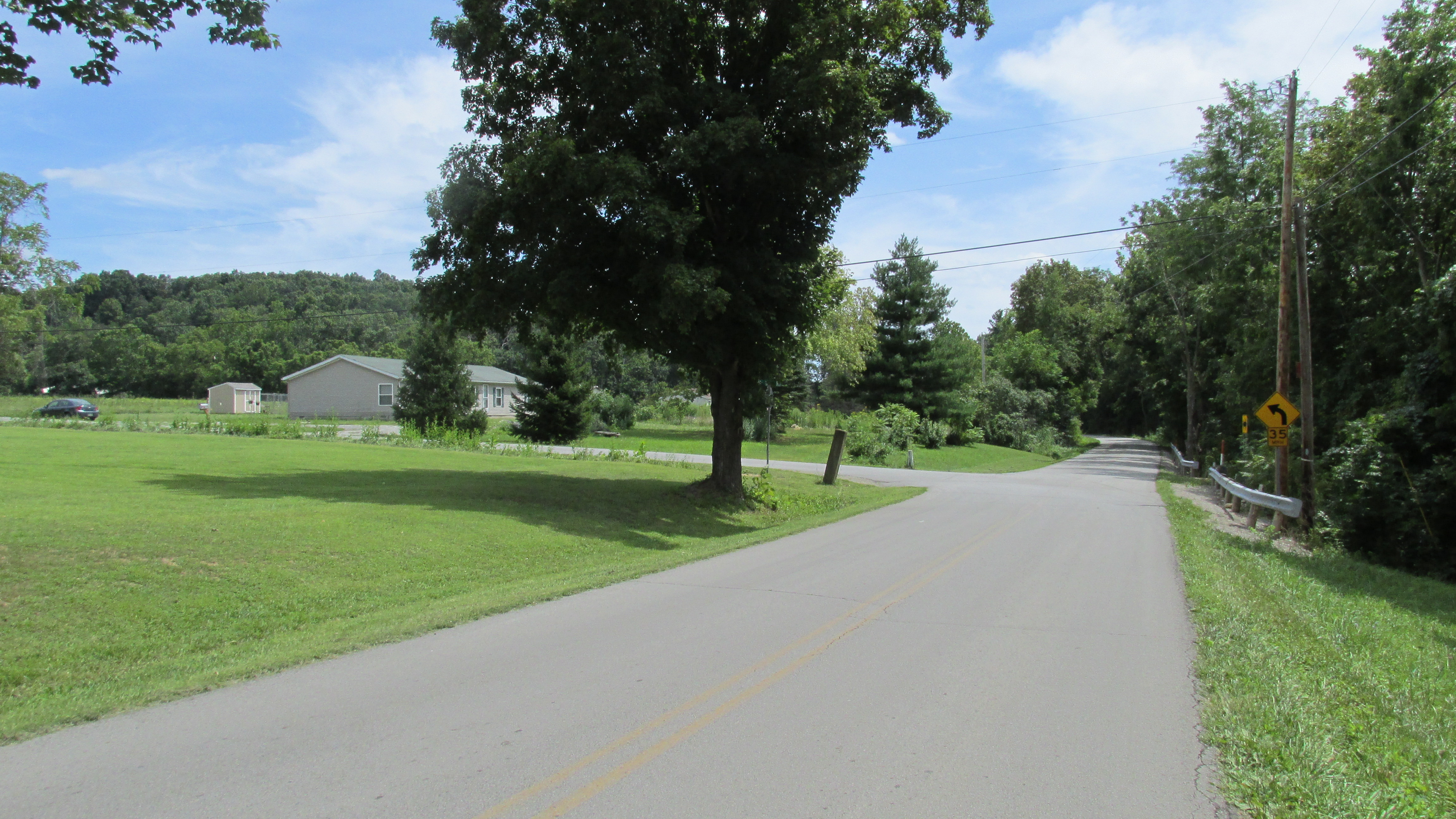
- Scene at Denver

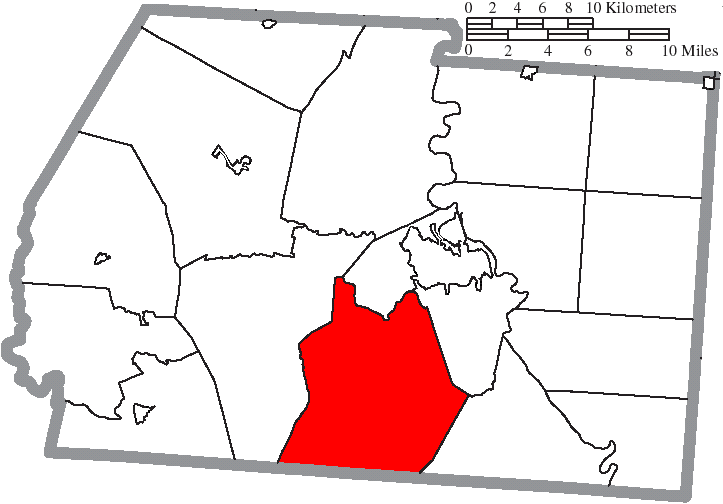
- Location of Huntington Township in Ross County
- Coordinates: 39°14′44″N 83°3′25″W
- Country: United States
- State: Ohio
- County: Ross

Area
  - Total: 59.6 sq mi (154.3 km^{2})
  - Land: 59.5 sq mi (154.0 km^{2})
  - Water: 0.12 sq mi (0.3 km^{2})
- Elevation: 955 ft (291 m)

Population (2020)
  - Total: 6,069
  - Density: 102/sq mi (39.4/km^{2})
- Time zone: UTC-5 (Eastern (EST))
  - Summer (DST): UTC-4 (EDT)
- FIPS code: 39-36890
- GNIS feature ID: 1086898
- Website: http://www.huntingtontownshipohio.com/

Huntington Township is one of the sixteen townships of Ross County, Ohio, United States. The 2020 census found 6,069 people in the township.

== Geography ==
Located in the southern part of the county, it borders the following townships:

- Scioto Township - north
- Franklin Township - east
- Pee Pee Township, Pike County - southeast
- Pebble Township, Pike County - south
- Twin Township - west

No municipalities are located in Huntington Township, although two unincorporated communities are located there: Denver in the south, and Knockemstiff in the northeast.

== Name and history ==
Statewide, other Huntington Townships are located in Brown, Gallia, and Lorain counties.

== Government ==
The township is governed by a three-member board of trustees, who are elected in November of odd-numbered years to a four-year term beginning on the following January 1. Two are elected in the year after the presidential election and one is elected in the year before it. There is also an elected township fiscal officer, who serves a four-year term beginning on April 1 of the year after the election, which is held in November of the year before the presidential election. Vacancies in the fiscal officership or on the board of trustees are filled by the remaining trustees.

== Education ==
Huntington High School is a central feature of Huntington Township. A well-maintained athletics facility is available for public use.

== Notable people ==
- Madison Hemings, son of Thomas Jefferson, a carpenter and farmer
