= Musselman, Ohio =

Unincorporated community in Ohio, U.S.

Coordinates: 39°22′05″N 83°08′33″W

Musselman is an unincorporated community in Ross County, in the U.S. state of Ohio.

== History ==
A train depot was built at Musselman in 1877 when the railroad was extended to that point. A post office called Musselman Station was established in 1879, the name was changed to Musselman in 1880, and the post office closed in 1908.
