= North Fork Village, Ohio =

- Former CDP
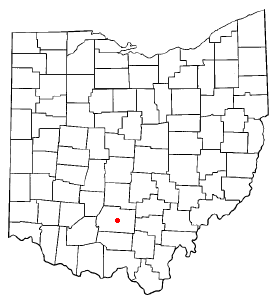
- Location of North Fork Village, Ohio
- Coordinates: 39°19′46″N 83°01′46″W
- Country: United States
- State: Ohio
- County: Ross

Area
  - Total: 1.5 sq mi (4.0 km^{2})
  - Land: 1.5 sq mi (4.0 km^{2})
  - Water: 0 sq mi (0.0 km^{2})
- Elevation: 643 ft (196 m)

Population (2000)
  - Total: 1,726
  - Density: 1,129/sq mi (436.1/km^{2})
- Time zone: UTC-5 (Eastern (EST))
  - Summer (DST): UTC-4 (EDT)
- FIPS code: 39-56546
- GNIS feature ID: 2393152

North Fork Village is an unincorporated community and former census-designated place (CDP) in Ross County, Ohio, United States. The population was 1,726 at the 2000 census. It was not delineated as a CDP for the 2010 census.

== Geography ==
According to the United States Census Bureau, the CDP had a total area of 1.5 square miles (3.9 km^{2}), all land.

North Fork Paint Creek runs through the area.

== Demographics ==
As of the census of 2000, there were 1,726 people, 723 households, and 466 families residing in the CDP. The population density was 1,129.6 inhabitants per square mile (436.1/km^{2}). There were 780 housing units at an average density of 510.5 per square mile (197.1/km^{2}). The racial makeup of the CDP was 94.44% White, 4.35% African American, 0.17% Native American, 0.75% Asian, and 0.29% from two or more races. Hispanic or Latino of any race were 0.64% of the population.

There were 723 households, out of which 31.1% had children under the age of 18 living with them, 49.7% were married couples living together, 11.8% had a female householder with no husband present, and 35.5% were non-families. 30.0% of all households were made up of individuals, and 11.9% had someone living alone who was 65 years of age or older. The average household size was 2.33 and the average family size was 2.91.

In the CDP the population was spread out, with 24.6% under the age of 18, 9.1% from 18 to 24, 29.1% from 25 to 44, 22.5% from 45 to 64, and 14.8% who were 65 years of age or older. The median age was 38 years. For every 100 females, there were 82.6 males. For every 100 females age 18 and over, there were 80.6 males.

The median income for a household in the CDP was $40,750, and the median income for a family was $53,068. Males had a median income of $46,950 versus $31,019 for females. The per capita income for the CDP was $22,314. About 2.2% of families and 4.4% of the population were below the poverty line, including 1.7% of those under age 18 and 10.0% of those age 65 or over.
