= Higby, Ohio =

Unincorporated community in Ohio, U.S.

Coordinates: 39°11′46″N 82°51′59″W

Higby is an unincorporated community in Ross County, in the U.S. state of Ohio. The Scioto River passes through Higby.

== History ==
Higby had its start when the railroad was extended to that point. The community has the name of Judiah Ellsworth Higby, a pioneer citizen. A post office called Higby was established in 1878, and remained in operation until 1933.
