= 87th Ohio Infantry Regiment =

- Active: June 10, 1862, to September 20, 1862
- Country: United States
- Allegiance: Union
- Branch: Infantry
- Engagements: Battle of Harpers Ferry

The 87th Ohio Infantry Regiment, sometimes 87th Ohio Volunteer Infantry (or 87th OVI) was an infantry regiment in the Union Army during the American Civil War.

== Service ==
The 87th Ohio Infantry was organized at Camp Chase in Columbus, Ohio and mustered in on June 10, 1862, for three months service under Colonel Henry Blackstone Banning.

The regiment left Ohio for Baltimore, Maryland, June 12, and performed duty in the defenses of that city until July 28. It was later attached to Railroad Brigade, VIII Corps, Middle Department. It was ordered to Harpers Ferry, West Virginia on July 28, and attached to Miles' Command. It had garrison duty in the defenses of Bolivar Heights until September. It fought in skirmishes at Berlin [now Brunswick] and Point of Rocks, Maryland, September 4–5 (detachment). It defended Harpers Ferry from September 12 to 15. It was at the surrender of Harpers Ferry on September 15. It was paroled on September 16 and sent to Annapolis, Maryland.

The 87th Ohio mustered out of the service at Camp Chase on September 20, 1862.

== Casualties ==
The regiment lost a total of 6 enlisted men, 1 killed and 5 due to disease.

== Commanders ==
- Colonel Henry B. Banning

== Notable members ==
- Colonel Henry B. Banning - U.S. Representative from Ohio, 1873–1879
- Corporal William Wellington Corlett, Company D - delegate from Wyoming Territory, 1877–1879
- Commissary Sergeant John Philo Hoyt - fourth governor of Arizona Territory, 1877–1878; justice of the Washington Territory Supreme Court, 1879–1887; President of the Washington Constitutional Convention, 1889

== See also ==
- List of Ohio Civil War units
- Ohio in the Civil War
