= The Devil All the Time (film) =

2020 American film by Antonio Campos

- Promotional release poster
- Directed by: Antonio Campos
- Screenplay by: Antonio Campos; Paulo Campos
- Based on: The Devil All the Time by Donald Ray Pollock
- Produced by: Jake Gyllenhaal; Riva Marker; Randall Poster; Max Born
- Starring: Tom Holland; Bill Skarsgård; Riley Keough; Jason Clarke; Sebastian Stan; Haley Bennett; Eliza Scanlen; Mia Wasikowska; Robert Pattinson
- Narrated by: Donald Ray Pollock
- Cinematography: Lol Crawley
- Edited by: Sofía Subercaseaux
- Music by: Danny Bensi; Saunder Jurriaans
- Production companies: Nine Stories Productions; Bronx Moving Company
- Distributed by: Netflix
- Release dates: September 11, 2020 (United States); September 16, 2020 (Netflix)
- Running time: 138 minutes
- Country: United States
- Language: English

The Devil All the Time is a 2020 American Southern Gothic psychological thriller crime film directed by Antonio Campos, from a screenplay co-written with his brother Paulo, based on the novel of the same title by Donald Ray Pollock (who also serves as the film's narrator). The film follows several characters whose stories weave together in two small towns, one in Ohio and the other in West Virginia, during the period from the end of World War II to the 1960s. It features an ensemble cast that includes Tom Holland, Robert Pattinson, Bill Skarsgård, Sebastian Stan, Riley Keough, Haley Bennett, Eliza Scanlen, Mia Wasikowska, and Jason Clarke.

The Devil All the Time was released in select theaters on September 11, 2020, and on Netflix on September 16, 2020. It received polarizing reviews from critics, who praised the performances (particularly Holland and Pattinson), but were critical of the film's length and dark tone.

== Plot ==
During World War II, while serving in the Solomon Islands, U.S. Marine Willard Russell and his patrol find Gunnery Sergeant Miller Jones skinned and crucified by Japanese soldiers. As the patrol examines his dog tag, Jones becomes conscious. Knowing that he will not survive, Willard shoots Jones in the head to end his agony. After the war, on his way home to Coal Creek, West Virginia, Willard passes through Meade, Ohio, where he meets Charlotte, a waitress at a diner, and a photographer named Carl Henderson. Willard and Charlotte marry and move to Knockemstiff, Ohio, where they have a son named Arvin.

In 1950, Helen Hatton—whom Willard’s mother, Emma, wanted him to marry—marries Roy Laferty. Roy is a bizarre, albeit charismatic, evangelical preacher who pours venomous spiders over his head while giving sermons to demonstrate his faith in God. Helen and Roy have a daughter named Lenora. During a sermon, Roy is bitten by a spider on his face and has a severe allergic reaction that affects his grip on reality, coming to believe that he can resurrect the dead. After Helen drops off Lenora at Emma's home, Roy takes Helen out to the woods and stabs her in the neck with a screwdriver. He then tries and fails to resurrect her. A distraught Roy hitchhikes and is picked up by photographer Carl Henderson and his wife Sandy, who met at the same time and place Willard and Charlotte did. Carl and Sandy are revealed to be serial killers who pick up male hitchhikers, encourage them to have sex with Sandy while Carl takes photographs, then murder them. Roy refuses to have sex with Sandy, but Carl kills him anyway.

In 1957, Willard erects a wooden cross in the woods behind his family home, where he makes Arvin pray daily by kneeling at their "prayer log," a fallen tree at its base. Later, Charlotte is diagnosed with cancer. Willard believes he can influence God with fervent prayer to remove the cancer from his wife's body. He prays to God and sacrifices Arvin's dog as an offering, crucifying its body at the prayer log. Despite his efforts, Charlotte dies. Devastated, Willard commits suicide by slitting his throat at the base of the rustic cross. Arvin discovers his father's body beneath the rotting corpse of his dog, and later leads Sheriff Lee Bodecker, the corrupt brother of Sandy Henderson, to the scene. Arvin goes to live with his grandmother Emma in Coal Creek, who has also adopted Lenora.

In 1965, Arvin—now a young adult working manual jobs around town— receives Willard's Luger from his uncle as a birthday present. He is fiercely protective of high school-aged Lenora, who is bullied by some local greasers. One day, their harassment pushes Arvin to attack them mercilessly. The pious Lenora grows close to the new, self-righteous Reverend Preston Teagardin, whom Arvin resents for previously ridiculing Emma. Reverend Preston grooms Lenora, eventually sexually assaulting her and she becomes pregnant. When she informs Preston, he rejects her. Overwhelmed by the bullying and her pregnancy, Lenora considers hanging herself. Right before she does, she changes her mind but ends up accidentally hanging herself. After the autopsy, Arvin is told that she was pregnant. Stalking Preston, he sees him grooming another girl and deduces that Preston was the father. Confronting him alone at the church, Arvin shoots and kills Preston with the Luger before fleeing.

Arvin decides to drive back to his childhood home in Knockemstiff, his car breaks down however and he ultimately decides to hitchhike there instead. He is picked up by Carl and Sandy, whose relationship has become acrimonious. Upon noticing Carl's gun and realizing the Hendersons' ill intentions, Arvin kills the couple in self-defense. Afterwards, Arvin searches the car and finds evidence of the Henderson's serial killings, taking some of it with him. When Lee finds out that Carl and Sandy were murdered, he goes to their apartment and burns Carl's photo collection to protect himself and his upcoming re-election campaign.

While investigating their deaths, Lee concludes that Arvin was responsible. He tracks him to Willard's cross, where Arvin has gone to bury his dog. As Arvin places the bones in the ground beneath the prayer log, Lee arrives and attempts to kill Arvin with a shotgun. A shootout ensues and Arvin shoots Lee in the chest. As the sheriff dies, Arvin explains his actions and plants the evidence of Carl and Sandy's killings on Lee's body so that their crimes will be revealed. Arvin then places Willard's Luger in the hole with bones and buries them.

As Preston's death is also uncovered, Arvin hitchhikes out of the area with a hippie headed to Cincinnati. As they drive off, Arvin falls asleep and contemplates his future, which he imagines will be very similar to Willard's.

== Cast ==
- Tom Holland as Arvin Russell
  - Michael Banks Repeta as Young Arvin
- Bill Skarsgård as Willard Russell, Arvin's father
- Riley Keough as Sandy Henderson, Lee's sister
- Jason Clarke as Carl Henderson, Sandy's husband
- Sebastian Stan as Deputy Lee Bodecker, Sandy's brother
- Haley Bennett as Charlotte Russell, Arvin's mother
- Eliza Scanlen as Lenora Laferty
- Mia Wasikowska as Helen Hatton, Lenora's mother
- Robert Pattinson as Rev. Preston Teagardin
- Harry Melling as Roy Laferty, Lenora's father
- Douglas Hodge as Leroy Brown
- Kristin Griffith as Emma Russell, Willard's mother and Lenora's adoptive mother
- Pokey LaFarge as Theodore, Roy's cousin
- Drew Starkey as Tommy Matson

In addition, narration throughout the film is performed by Donald Ray Pollock, the author of the novel.

== Production ==
Production for The Devil All the Time was announced in September 2018, with Tom Holland, Robert Pattinson, Chris Evans and Mia Wasikowska in talks to star. Antonio Campos was set to write and direct the film, with Jake Gyllenhaal serving as producer. In January 2019, Bill Skarsgård and Eliza Scanlen joined the cast, and Netflix was set to distribute the film. Sebastian Stan was cast to replace Evans, after scheduling conflicts caused him to drop out and personally recommended Stan for the role. Additionally, Jason Clarke, Riley Keough and Haley Bennett were announced as part of the cast, and in March 2019, Harry Melling also joined. Saunder Jurriaans and Danny Bensi composed the film's score.

Principal photography began on February 19, 2019, in Alabama, with filming locations including Anniston, Pell City, Birmingham, and Montevallo. Filming completed on April 15, 2019.

=== Visual style ===
Campos stated that visual inspiration from the film mainly stemmed from the visual descriptions that Pollock provided in the novel itself. "The book kind of offers these amazing moments and images, things like, the prayer log, Carl's photographs in the book," Campos stated, "it gets your mind going." The film's visual style is inspired by painter Andrew Wyeth and photographer William Eggleston. Campos stated that the scenes that were inspired by Eggleston's work were mainly due to how colorful they were. Appalachia itself also inspired Campos and company when they were considering the visuals in the film. Campos wanted the film to mirror what Appalachia looked like during the timeline when the story takes place.

== Release ==
The Devil All the Time was released in select theaters on September 11, 2020, and digitally, on Netflix, on September 16, 2020.

The film was the most-watched on Netflix over its first two days, and third overall in its first five days. In November 2020, Variety reported the film was the 22nd-most watched straight-to-streaming title of 2020 up to that point.

== Reception ==
On the review aggregator website Rotten Tomatoes, 65% of 219 critics' reviews are positive, with an average rating of 6.4/10. The website's consensus reads: "The Devil All the Time's descent into darkness can be harrowing to the point of punishment, but it's offset by strong work from a stellar cast." Metacritic, which uses a weighted average, assigned the film a score of 55 out of 100, based on 39 critics, indicating "mixed or average" reviews.

The Chicago Tribune's Michael Phillips wrote, "It's easy on the eyes... worth seeing for an intriguingly cast ensemble, authenticating the milieu as much as possible. Holland's terrific, taking in each new setback in [his character's] life without revealing the full extent of the damage."

Ryan Lattanzio of IndieWire gave The Devil All the Time a "C−" and called it a "colossal misfire, a sweaty mess from start to finish," although he praised Holland and Pattinson's performances. Owen Gleiberman of Variety said that "it's hard to imagine how a movie with this much sordid crime and violence could be this rote" and wrote "The Devil All the Time shows us a lot of bad behavior, but the movie isn't really interested in what makes the sinners tick. And without that lurid curiosity, it's just a series of Sunday School lessons: a noir that wants to scrub away the darkness."
