= Samuel Fenton Cary =

American politician (1814–1900)

Samuel Cary
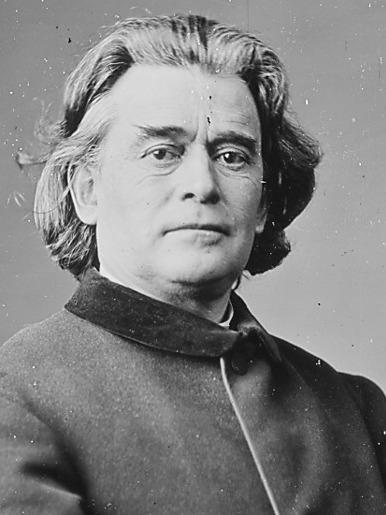
- Cary, c. 1860–1865

Member of the U.S. House of Representatives from Ohio's 2nd district
- In office November 21, 1867 – March 3, 1869
- Preceded by: Rutherford B. Hayes
- Succeeded by: Job E. Stevenson

Personal details
- Born: Samuel Fenton Cary; February 18, 1814 Cincinnati, Ohio, U.S.
- Died: September 29, 1900 (aged 86) Cincinnati, Ohio, U.S.
- Resting place: Spring Grove Cemetery
- Party: Republican (Before 1868); Democratic (1868–1876); Greenback (1876–1889)
- Spouse(s): Maria Allen; Lida Stillwell
- Children: 6
- Education: Miami University, Oxford (BA); University of Cincinnati (LLB)

Samuel Fenton Cary (February 18, 1814 – September 29, 1900) was an American politician who was a member of the U.S. House of Representatives from Ohio and significant temperance movement leader in the 19th century. Cary became well known nationally as a prohibitionist author and lecturer.

== Early life ==
Cary was born on February 18, 1814, in Cincinnati, Ohio, where he attended public schools. He graduated from Miami University in 1835 and from the Cincinnati Law School in 1837.

== Early career ==
Cary was admitted to the bar in 1837, practicing law out of his in office in Cincinnati. He was elected a judge in the Ohio State Supreme Court, but decided to pass on the position, continuing to practice law.

He stopped working in law in 1845 to become a farmer and also to devote himself to temperance and anti-slavery groups. He gave lectures and wrote books on prohibition and slavery matters. He was a delegate to the Republican National Convention in 1864 supporting Abraham Lincoln for a second term. Cary served as paymaster general for the State of Ohio under Governors Bartley and Bebb. He then became Collector of Internal Revenue for Ohio's first district in 1865.

== U.S. House of Representatives ==
In 1867, Cary was elected to the 40th United States Congress as an Independent Republican to represent Ohio's second district, filling the vacancy left by the resignation of Rutherford B. Hayes who had just been elected Governor of Ohio. He served in Congress from November 21, 1867, to March 3, 1869. There, he became the chairman of the Committee on Education and Labor. Cary voted against the impeachment of President Andrew Johnson, and against both the initial and final versions of the Fifteenth Amendment to the United States Constitution, one of three and four (respectively) House Republicans to do so. He lost his reelection campaign in 1868 to Job E. Stevenson.

== Campaigns for lieutenant governor and vice president ==
In 1875, Cary was also an unsuccessful candidate for Lieutenant Governor of Ohio.

Cary joined the Greenback Party and was the nominee for Vice President of the United States in the 1876 election after Newton Booth declined to run. He ran with Peter Cooper who was running for the presidency against Rutherford B. Hayes. Hayes won the presidency along with his running mate, William A. Wheeler. Cooper and Cary also came behind the Democratic Party candidates Samuel J. Tilden and Thomas A. Hendricks.

== Honors ==
Frank Page, the founder and first mayor of Cary, North Carolina, named the town after Cary because he admired Cary's temperance speech given in the community previously.

== Personal ==
Cary was twice married. First to Maria Louisa Allen on October 18, 1836; she died of consumption on September 25, 1847. They had three children: Martha Louisa Cary, Ella Woodnutt Cary and Lou Allen Cary. In 1849, he married Lida Stillwell. They had three children: Olive Cary, Samuel Fenton Cary Jr., and Jessie Cary.

Cary lived out final twenty years of his life as a writer and lecturer. He died at the Cary Homestead in College Hill, Cincinnati, Ohio, on September 29, 1900. He is interred with his family in Spring Grove Cemetery in Cincinnati.

U.S. House of Representatives
Preceded by Rutherford B. Hayes	Member of the U.S. House of Representatives from Ohio's 2nd congressional district 1867–1869	Succeeded by Job E. Stevenson
Preceded by Jehu Baker	Chair of the House Education Committee; 1869	Succeeded by Samuel Arnell
Party political offices
Preceded by Barnabas Burns	Democratic nominee for Lieutenant Governor of Ohio; 1875	Succeeded by Jabez W. Fitch
Preceded by Newton Booth; Withdrew	Greenback nominee for Vice President of the United States; 1876	Succeeded by Barzillai J. Chambers
