= Vigo, Ohio =

Unincorporated community in Ohio, U.S.

Coordinates: 39°14′52″N 82°47′35″W

Vigo is an unincorporated community in Ross County, in the U.S. state of Ohio.

== History ==
A post office called Vigo was in operation from 1858 until 1933. Besides post office, Vigo had a railroad station, hotel, church, brick plant, and several country stores.
