= Tucson, Ohio =

Unincorporated community in Ohio, U.S.

Coordinates: 39°21′23″N 82°49′34″W

Tucson is an unincorporated community in Ross County, in the U.S. state of Ohio.

== History ==
A post office called Tucson was established in 1890, and remained in operation until 1907. Besides post office, Tucson had a gristmill, built in 1842, and a country store.
