= Fruitdale, Ohio =

Unincorporated community in Ohio, U.S.

Coordinates: 39°18′06″N 83°20′23″W

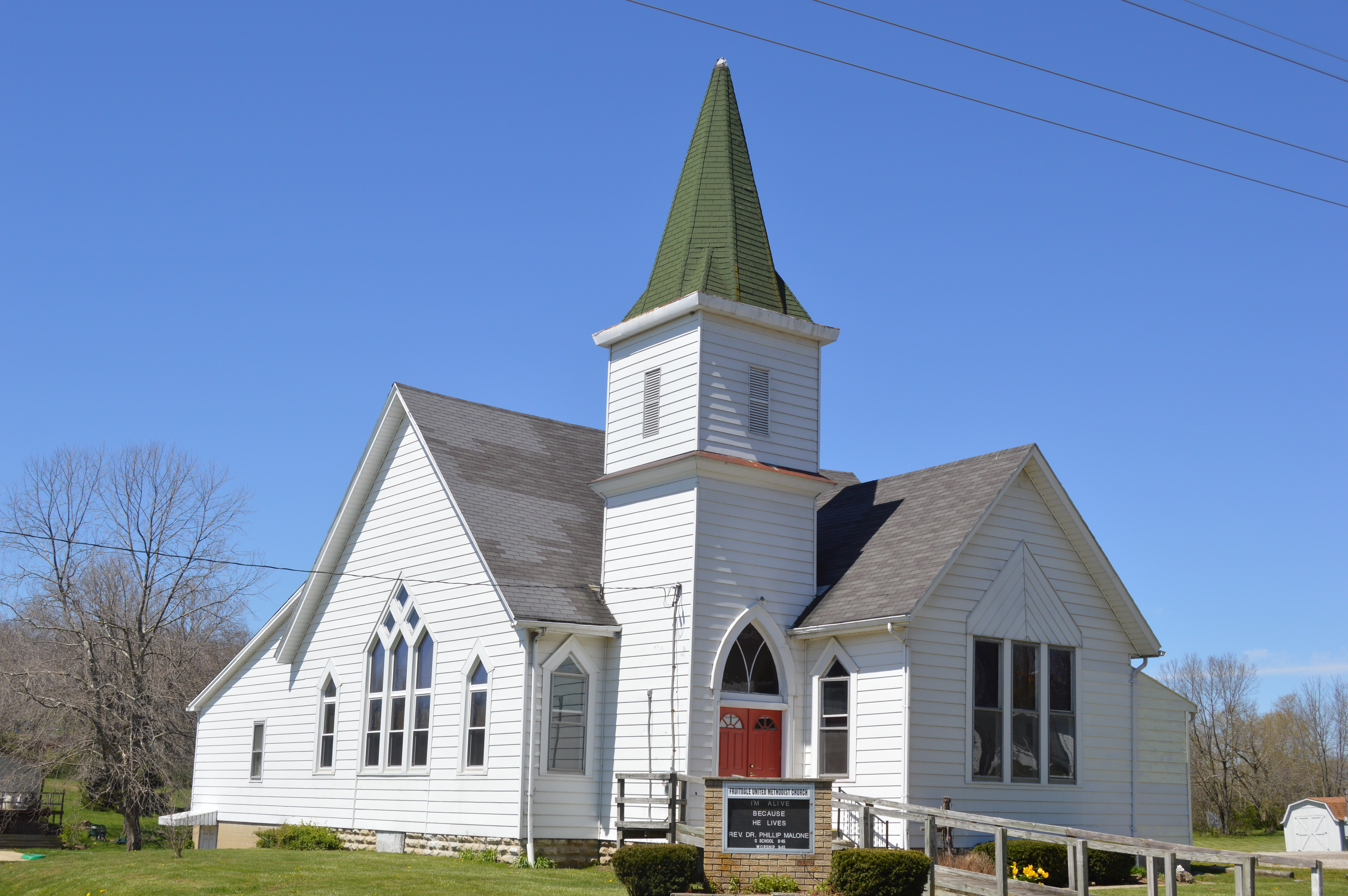
Methodist church

Fruitdale is an unincorporated community in Ross County, in the U.S. state of Ohio.

== History ==
The community was so named on account of fruit orchards near the original site. A post office called Fruitdale was established in 1891, and remained in operation until 1931. Besides the post office, Fruitdale had a train depot on the Ohio Southern Railroad.
