= Slate Mills, Ohio =

Unincorporated community in Ohio, U.S.

Coordinates: 39°21′02″N 83°03′26″W

Slate Mills is an unincorporated community in Ross County, in the U.S. state of Ohio.

== History ==
The namesake Slate Mills was a mill built at the site in 1827. A post office called Slate Mills was established in 1860, and remained in operation until 1906.
