= The Devil All the Time (novel) =

Novel by Donald Ray Pollock

- First edition cover art
- Author: Donald Ray Pollock
- Language: English
- Genre: Gothic, crime
- Published: July 12, 2011 (Doubleday)
- Publication place: United States
- Media type: Print (Hardcover, paperback)
- Pages: 272
- ISBN: 978-0-385-53504-5

The Devil All the Time is the debut novel by American writer Donald Ray Pollock, published in 2011 by Doubleday. Its plot follows disparate characters in post-World War II Southern Ohio and West Virginia, including a disturbed war veteran, a husband and wife who are serial killers, and an abusive preacher. A film adaptation of the same name directed by Antonio Campos and narrated by Pollock, starred Tom Holland, Sebastian Stan, Robert Pattinson and Bill Skarsgård, and was produced by Jake Gyllenhaal.

== Plot ==
The Devil All the Time follows the events and fates of various characters who all carry their own secrets from the past. As the novel progresses the lives of these people converge in unexpected ways.

In the prologue, a young boy named Arvin sits on an oak log with his father, Willard, for his obsessive evening prayer routine. Arvin and Willard overhear a pair of hunters discussing Willard’s wife, Charlotte, in a lewd manner, and Arvin is disappointed that his father does not react. However, later that day, Willard takes Arvin with him to track down the men, and beats one of them to near-death, to Arvin’s awe.

The rest of the book is divided into seven parts. Part One, "Sacrifice," begins in 1945, before the prologue. Willard has just been discharged from combat duty after the end of World War II and travels home to Coal Creek, West Virginia. He recalls the horrifying things he saw during the war, in particular a soldier who was skinned and crucified; Willard shoots the man as an act of mercy, and later kills the Japanese soldiers responsible. At the Wooden Spoon Diner in Meade, Ohio, he meets and instantly falls in love with a beautiful waitress, Charlotte Willoughby. At home, he is met by his mother, Emma, and her brother, his Uncle Earskell. Emma worries about Willard’s interest in Charlotte, as she prayed to God for his safe return and offered in exchange that Willard would marry pious local woman Helen Hatton.

Willard and Emma attend a local service by preacher cousins Roy and Theodore, and everyone in the church is scared away when Roy dumps a bin full of spiders on his own head as a stunt, except for Helen. Helen later marries Roy and they have a daughter named Lenora. When Roy is bitten by a spider and loses faith, jealous Theodore eggs him on, claiming that he can raise living beings from the dead. They plot to murder Helen, stabbing her with a screwdriver, but fail to revive her. They flee town, leaving Lenora with Emma.

Meanwhile, Willard marries Charlotte and they raise Arvin in Meade before moving to a rented house in Knockemstiff. When Charlotte is diagnosed with cancer, Willard becomes obsessed with prayer and he begins offering sacrifices of animals and blood at the prayer log. As Charlotte’s condition worsens, he murders their landlord Henry Dunlap, and offers his blood in sacrifice. When Charlotte dies nonetheless, Willard slits his own throat at the log, and Arvin finds his body. He goes to the local storekeeper, Hank, who calls Sheriff Bodecker. Bodecker is horrified by the bloodbath of sacrifices at the prayer log.

In Part 2, "On the Hunt," the reader is introduced to Carl and Sandy Henderson, a pair of murderous lowlifes living in Meade, who pick up male hitchhikers, lure them into sex with Sandy, and brutally kill them. Carl, an unemployed photographer, takes personal pleasure in staging explicit photographs of the rape and murders, and calls the victims “models”. They remain undetected, and embark on annual summer road trips to look for more victims. Sandy's brother, Sheriff Bodecker, dislikes Carl and resents Sandy’s blatant prostitution at the bar where she works, but remains oblivious of their crimes while engaging in corruption schemes of his own.

In Part 3, "Orphans and Ghosts," Arvin moves in with Emma, his grandmother, and grows protective of Lenora. On Arvin’s fifteenth birthday, Uncle Earskell gifts him his father's gun, a German Luger from his WWII service. When Lenora is bullied at school, Arvin comes to her defense by tracking down each of the bullies at a later date and brutally beating them. Roy and Theodore travel with a circus freak show, performing an act where Roy preaches and eats live insects, but they are kicked out when Theodore is caught molesting a young boy.

Part 4, "Winter," focuses largely on Carl and Sandy's continued murderous exploits. Carl reflects on their early marriage, when they moved to California to pursue Carl’s photography. Carl convinces Sandy to participate in a porn production, but it goes badly wrong, with Sandy assaulted and Carl cheated out of the money. On their way back from California, they pick up their first hitchhiker and kill him for his money, taking their first set of pictures. In the present, Carl begins frequenting a new bar and flirting with the young waitress, pretending to be a real photographer. He buys Sandy a gun of her own, but becomes nervous when she takes to it, and eventually replaces her bullets with blanks.

In Part 5, "Preacher," the Knockemstiff church replaces their dying old reverend with his nephew, Pastor Teagardin, who lives with his much younger wife, Cynthia. Teagardin is revealed to be a habitual predator, who is obsessed with taking teen girls’ virginities. Teagardin successfully seduces Lenora, and gets her pregnant. When Lenora confronts Teagardin, he denies his part in it and coldly rejects her, having already moved on to other girls. Lenora commits suicide. Arvin puts together what happened, shoots Teagardin dead, and flees Coal Creek. Meanwhile, Roy returns from work one day to find Theodore dead, and decides to return to Ohio to look for Lenora.

In Part 6, "Serpents," Carl and Sandy embark on their newest road trip, picking up and murdering Roy amongst others. One planned victim escapes, causing Carl to obsess over completing another kill before the trip is over. Arvin decides to hitchhike back to Meade and Knockemstiff to visit where his parents met and raised him.

In Part 7, “Ohio”, Carl and Sandy pick up Arvin, but Arvin shoots and kills Carl by surprise, and then kills Sandy when her gun only shot blanks. Sheriff Bodecker pursues Arvin to the prayer log in Knockemstiff, having discovered Carl’s pictures and intending to kill Arvin to cover up his sister’s crimes in self-preservation. Arvin outsmarts and kills Bodecker, leaving one of the incriminating photos on his body. He sets off on the road again, intending to hitchhike.

== Reception ==
Writing for The New York Times, Josh Ritter praised the novel, describing its prose as "sickly beautiful as it is hard-boiled. [Pollock]'s scenes have a rare and unsettling ability to make the reader woozy, the ends of the chapters flicking like black horseflies off the page." Lisa Shea of Elle wrote that the "flawless cadence of Pollock's gorgeous shadow-and-light prose plays against the heinous acts of his sorrowful and sometimes just sorry characters." Carolyn Kellogg of the Los Angeles Times praised Pollock's narrative method, writing that he "deftly shifts from one perspective to another, without any clunky transitions – the prose just moves without signal or stumble, opening up the story in new ways again and again... The Devil All the Time should cement his reputation as a significant voice in American fiction."

Jeff Baker of The Oregonian noted that the novel "reads as if the love child of [Flannery] O'Connor and [William] Faulkner was captured by Cormac McCarthy, kept in a cage out back and forced to consume nothing but onion rings, Oxycontin and Terrence Malick's Badlands." Publishers Weekly commented "If Pollock's powerful collection Knockemstiff was a punch to the jaw, his follow-up, a novel set in the violent soul-numbing towns of southern Ohio and West Virginia, feels closer to a mule's kick, and how he draws these folks and their inevitably hopeless lives without pity is what the kick's all about."

The French literary publication Lire named The Devil All the Time as the best novel of the year in 2012.

== Accolades ==
- Won—2012 Grand Prix de Littérature Policière
- Won—2012 Prix du Livre de l'Année (Magazine Lire)
- Won—2012 Thomas and Lillie D. Chaffin Award for Appalachian Writing (2012)
- 2013 Deutscher Krimi Preis (3rd place)
- Won—2013 Prix Mystère de la critique (1st place)

== Adaptation ==
The novel was adapted into a feature film of the same name by director Antonio Campos, released on Netflix. Filming began in Alabama on February 19, 2019 and concluded on April 15, 2019. It was released on September 16, 2020.
