= Humboldt, Ohio =

Unincorporated community in Ohio, U.S.

Coordinates: 39°16′38″N 83°18′50″W

Humboldt is an unincorporated community in Ross County, in the U.S. state of Ohio.

== History ==
Humboldt had its start in 1878 when the railroad was extended to that point. A post office called Humboldt was established in 1880, and remained in operation until 1935. Humboldt was a whistle stop on the Ohio Southern Railroad.
