= Meade, Ohio =

Unincorporated community in Ohio, U.S.

Coordinates: 39°30′17″N 82°52′37″W

Meade or Mutton Jerk or Salem is an unincorporated community in Pickaway Township, Pickaway County, Ohio, United States. Meade is located at the intersection of State Route 159 and Hayesville Rd. (Pickaway County Rd. #11). Its population is 79. Its children attend school in the Logan Elm Local School District. The nearest towns are Kingston (Ross County) and Circleville (Pickaway County). Meade has only one commercial building, which is the Salem United Methodist Church. Its central thoroughfare is Hayesville Road.

Meade has previously gone by the names Mutton Jerk and Salem. A post office called Meade was established in 1892, and remained in operation until 1903.

== Gallery ==
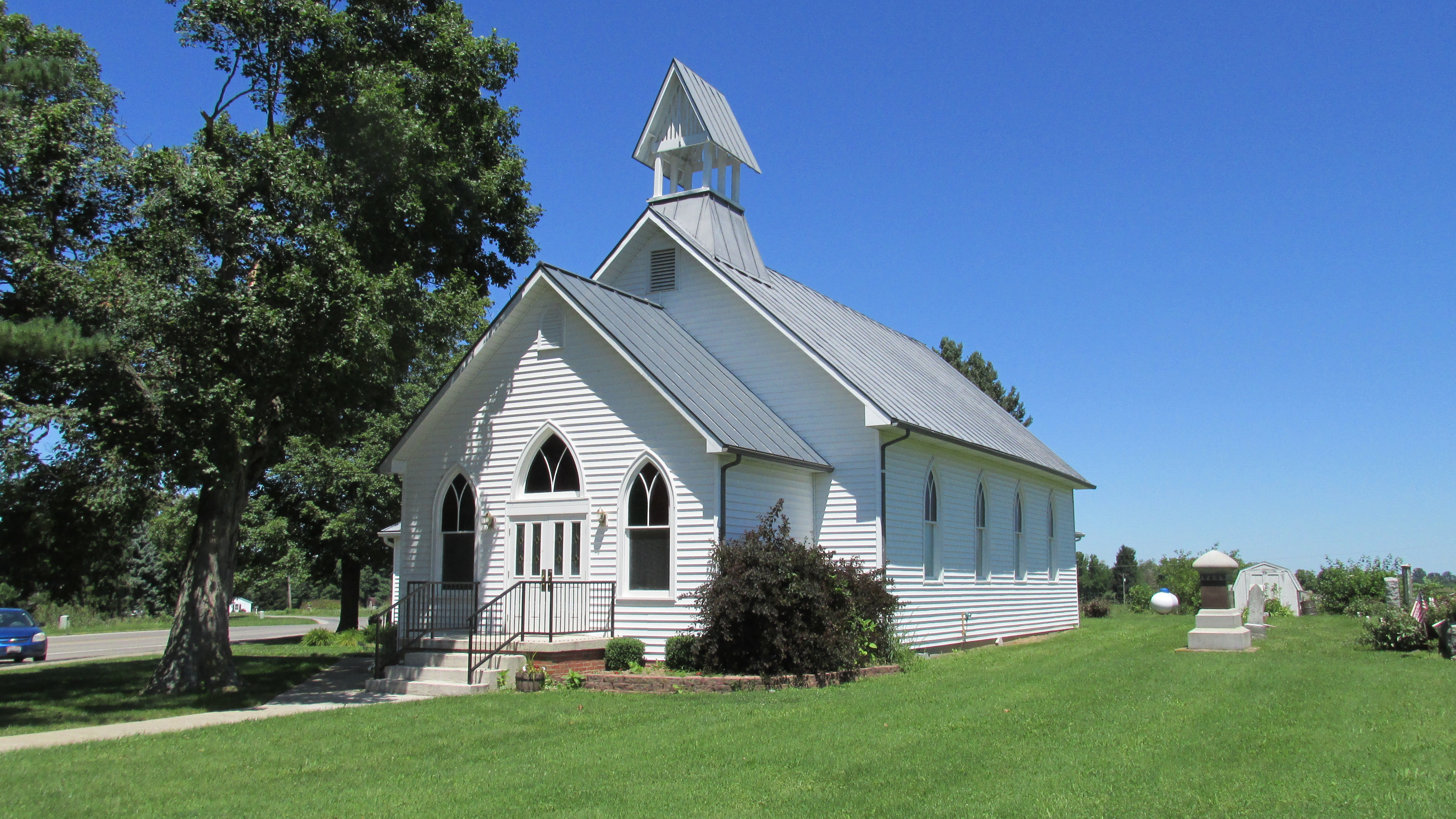
Salem United Methodist Church in Meade, Ohio

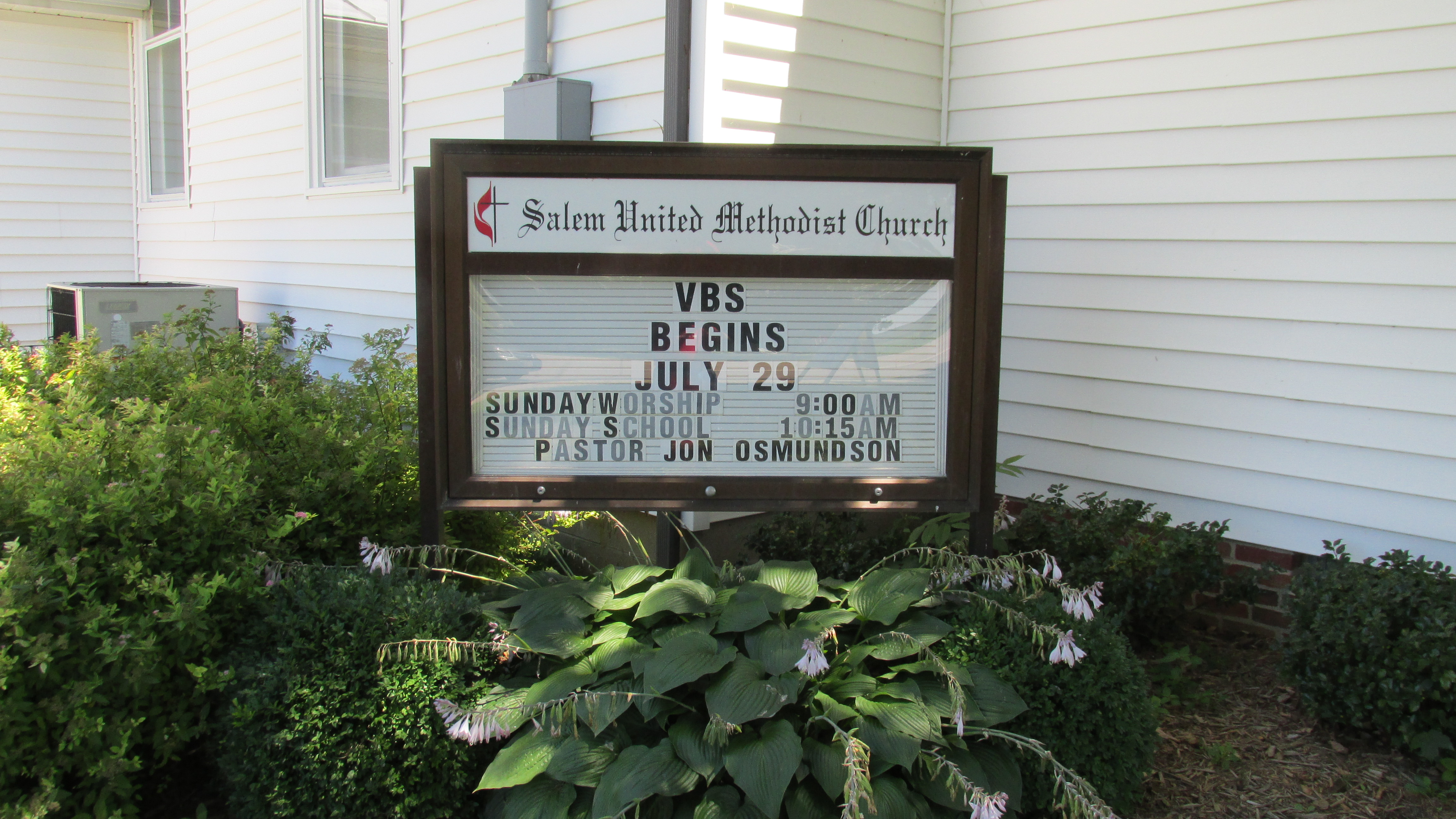
Church announcement board

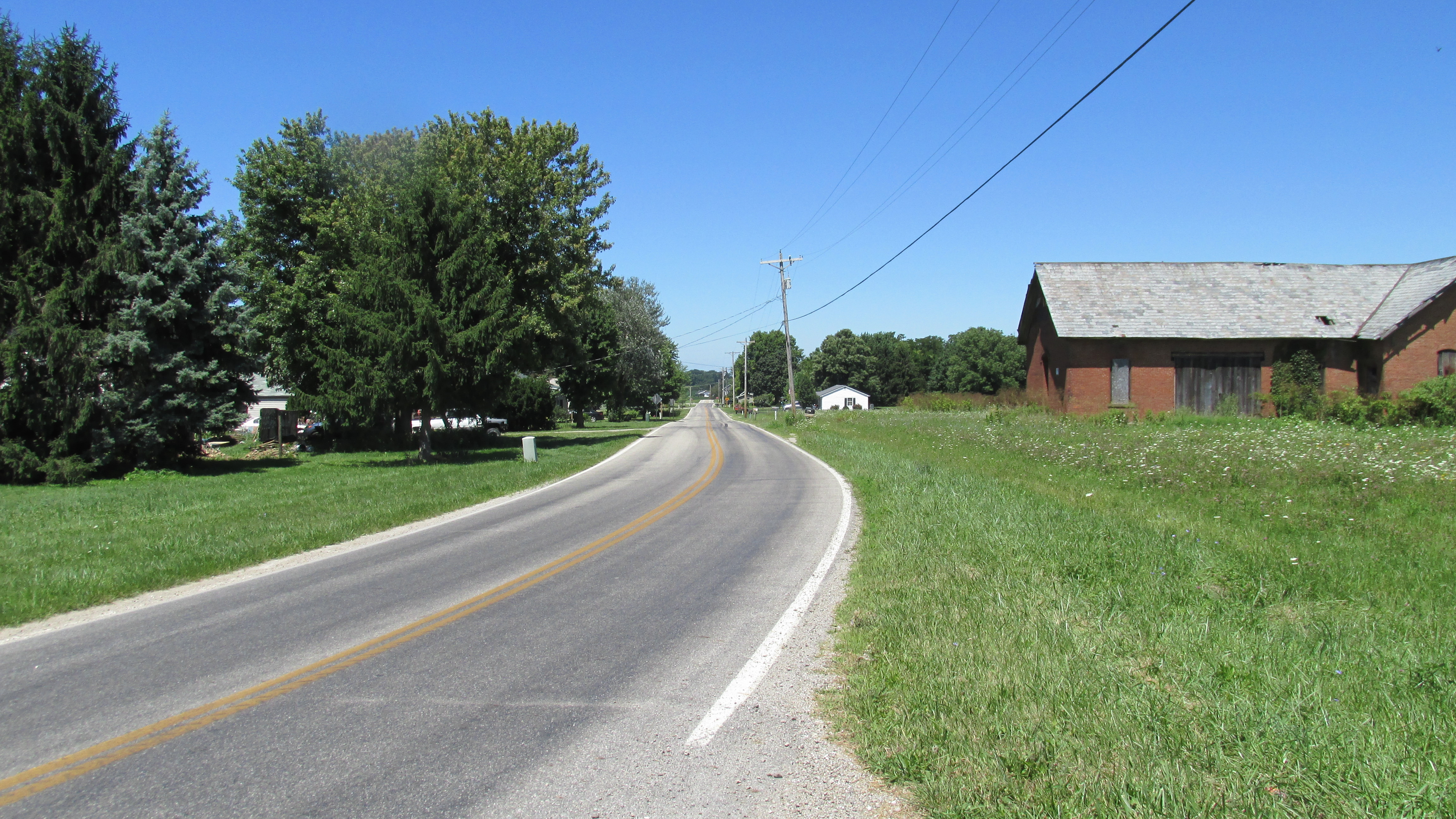
Looking northwest on Hayesville Road in Meade, Ohio
