= Summithill, Ohio =

Unincorporated community in Ohio, U.S.

Coordinates: 39°13′05″N 83°06′48″W

Summithill is an unincorporated community in Ross County, in the U.S. state of Ohio.

== History ==
Summithill had its start in the 1870s when the railroad was extended to that point, and so named on account of its lofty elevation. Variant names were "Summit" and "Summit Hill". A post office called Summit Hill was established in 1878, the name was changed to Summithill in 1895, and the post office closed in 1946.
