= Ross County, Ohio =

County in Ohio, United States

- County
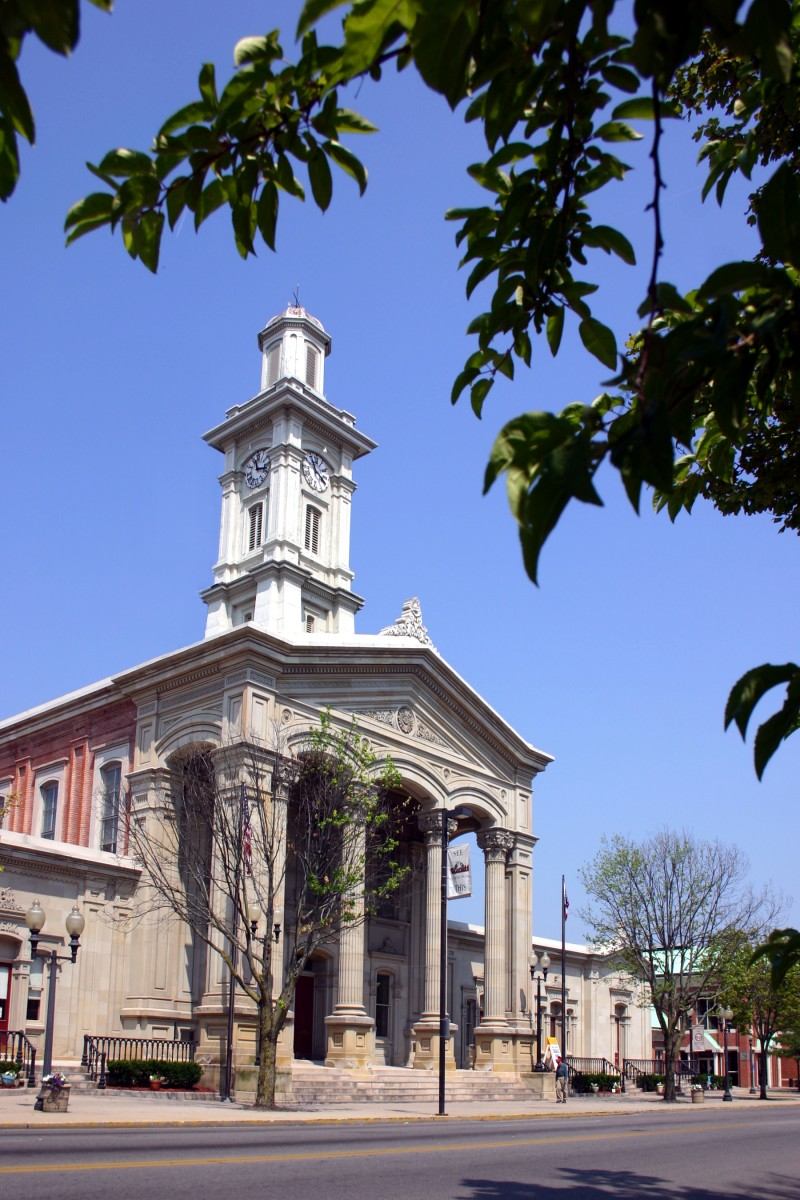
- Ross County Courthouse

- Flag Seal

- Location within the U.S. state of Ohio
- Coordinates: 39°20′N 83°04′W
- Country: United States
- State: Ohio
- Founded: August 20, 1798
- Named for: James Ross
- Seat: Chillicothe
- Largest city: Chillicothe

Area
  - Total: 693.03 sq mi (1,794.9 km^{2})
  - Land: 689.19 sq mi (1,785.0 km^{2})
  - Water: 3.84 sq mi (9.9 km^{2}) 0.6%

Population (2020)
  - Total: 77,093
  - Estimate (2025): 76,429 ▼
  - Density: 110/sq mi (42/km^{2})
- Time zone: UTC−5 (Eastern)
  - Summer (DST): UTC−4 (EDT)
- Congressional district: 2nd
- Website: www.co.ross.oh.us

Ross County is a county in the Appalachian region of the U.S. state of Ohio. As of the 2020 United States census, the population was 77,093. Its county seat is Chillicothe, the first and third capital of Ohio. Established on August 20, 1798, the county is named for Federalist Senator James Ross of Pennsylvania. Ross County comprises the Chillicothe, Ohio Micropolitan Statistical Area, which is also included in the Columbus–Marion–Zanesville Combined Statistical Area.

== History ==
Ross County was formed by proclamation of Governor St. Clair, August 20, 1798, being the sixth county formed in the Northwest Territory.

Ross County was described by Ephraim George Squier and Edwin Hamilton Davis as having almost "one hundred enclosures of various sizes, and five hundred mounds" in their book, Ancient Monuments of the Mississippi Valley (1848). They described the Indian-built earthworks as ranging from 5 to 30 feet (1.5–9.1 m) in size, and enclosures of 1 to 50 acres (0.40–20.23 ha) large. These included Serpent Mound, Fort Ancient, Mound City, and Seip Earthworks (both now part of Hopewell Culture National Historical Park), and Newark Earthworks.

== Geography ==
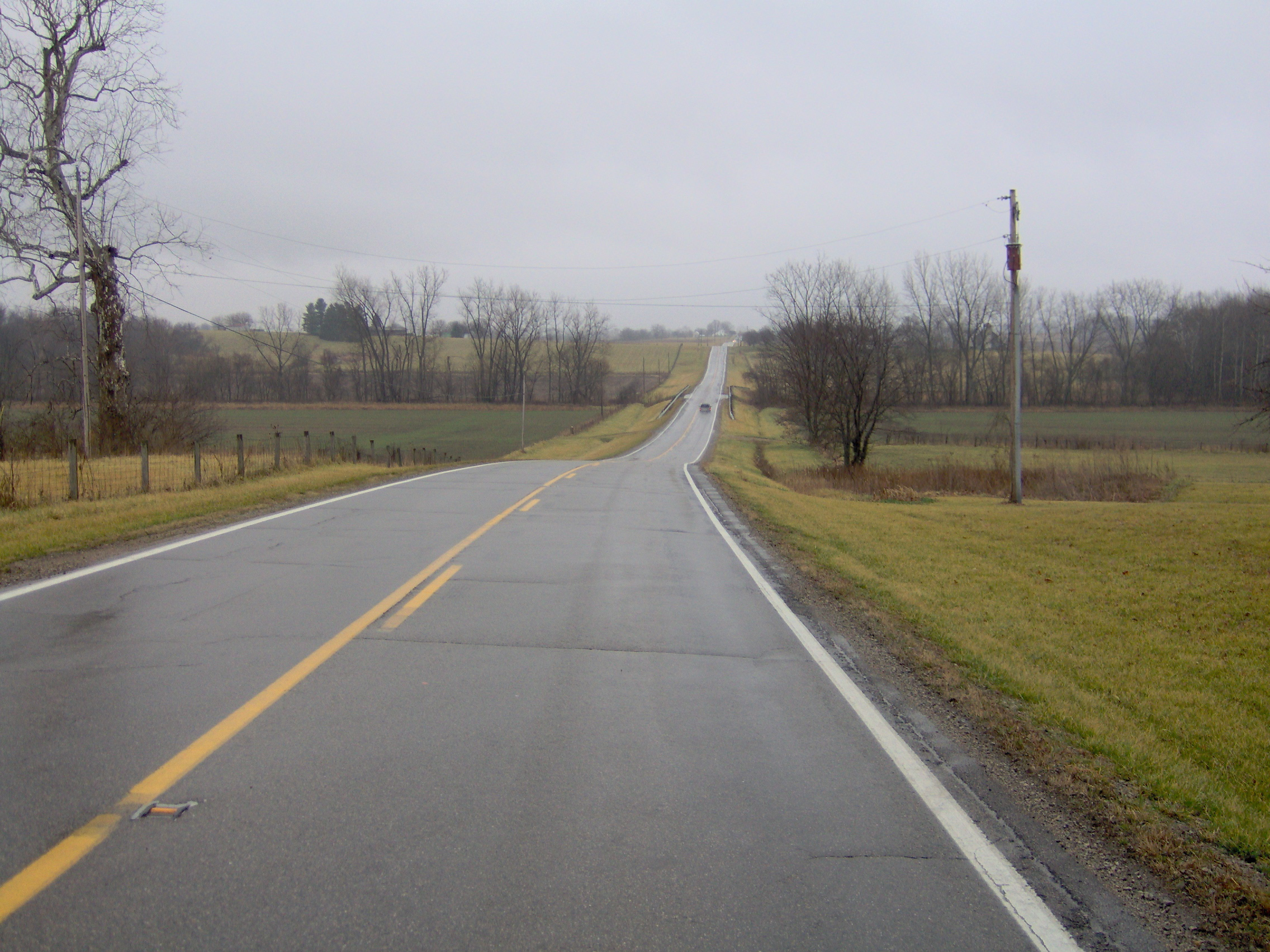
Countryside northeast of Chillicothe on State Route 180

The Scioto River flows southward through the east-central part of the county. Paint Creek drains the lower central part of the county, flowing eastward to its terminus with the Scioto at a point southeast of Chillicothe. The county terrain consists of frequent wooded hills, with the intermediate level areas devoted to agriculture. The county's highest point is Farrell Hill, six miles (9.7 km) northeast of Bainbridge. The county has a total area of 693 square miles (1,790 km^{2}), of which 689 square miles (1,780 km^{2}) is land and 3.8 square miles (9.8 km^{2}) (0.6%) is water. Ross County is the second-largest county by land area in Ohio, after Ashtabula County, as well as the fifth-largest by total area.

=== Adjacent counties ===
- Pickaway County – north
- Hocking County – northeast
- Vinton County – east
- Jackson County – southeast
- Pike County – south
- Highland County – southwest
- Fayette County – northwest

=== Protected areas ===
- Adena State Memorial
- Great Seal State Park
- Hopewell Culture National Historical Park
- Paint Creek State Park (part)
- Pleasant Valley Wildlife Area
- Ross Lake Wilderness Area
- Scioto Trail State Forest
- Scioto Trail State Park (part of American Discovery Trail)
- Tar Hollow State Forest (part)

== Demographics ==
Historical population
Census	Pop.	Note	%±
1800	8,540		—
1810	15,514		81.7%
1820	20,619		32.9%
1830	24,068		16.7%
1840	27,460		14.1%
1850	32,074		16.8%
1860	35,071		9.3%
1870	37,097		5.8%
1880	40,307		8.7%
1890	39,454		−2.1%
1900	40,940		3.8%
1910	40,069		−2.1%
1920	41,556		3.7%
1930	45,181		8.7%
1940	52,147		15.4%
1950	54,424		4.4%
1960	61,215		12.5%
1970	61,211		0.0%
1980	65,004		6.2%
1990	69,330		6.7%
2000	73,345		5.8%
2010	78,064		6.4%
2020	77,093		−1.2%
2025 (est.)	76,429	▼	−0.9%
US Decennial Census; 1790-1960 1900-1990; 1990-2000 2020

=== 2020 census ===
As of the 2020 census, the county had a population of 77,093. The median age was 41.4 years. 21.1% of residents were under the age of 18 and 17.8% of residents were 65 years of age or older. For every 100 females there were 109.3 males, and for every 100 females age 18 and over there were 110.5 males age 18 and over.

The racial makeup of the county was 88.3% White, 5.2% Black or African American, 0.3% American Indian and Alaska Native, 0.5% Asian, <0.1% Native Hawaiian and Pacific Islander, 0.5% from some other race, and 5.1% from two or more races. Hispanic or Latino residents of any race comprised 1.3% of the population.

41.2% of residents lived in urban areas, while 58.8% lived in rural areas.

There were 29,386 households in the county, of which 29.2% had children under the age of 18 living in them. Of all households, 46.2% were married-couple households, 18.9% were households with a male householder and no spouse or partner present, and 26.2% were households with a female householder and no spouse or partner present. About 28.2% of all households were made up of individuals and 13.1% had someone living alone who was 65 years of age or older.

There were 32,066 housing units, of which 8.4% were vacant. Among occupied housing units, 69.5% were owner-occupied and 30.5% were renter-occupied. The homeowner vacancy rate was 1.2% and the rental vacancy rate was 6.7%.

=== Racial and ethnic composition ===
Ross County, Ohio – Racial and ethnic composition Note: the US Census treats Hispanic/Latino as an ethnic category. This table excludes Latinos from the racial categories and assigns them to a separate category. Hispanics/Latinos may be of any race.
Race / ethnicity (NH = Non-Hispanic)	Pop 1980	Pop 1990	Pop 2000	Pop 2010	Pop 2020	% 1980	% 1990	% 2000	% 2010	% 2020
White alone (NH)	61,003	64,137	66,991	70,378	67,705	93.84%	92.51%	91.34%	90.15%	87.82%
Black or African American alone (NH)	3,404	4,412	4,534	4,804	4,005	5.24%	6.36%	6.18%	6.15%	5.20%
Native American or Alaska Native alone (NH)	63	146	206	212	189	0.10%	0.21%	0.28%	0.27%	0.25%
Asian alone (NH)	164	265	258	295	369	0.25%	0.38%	0.35%	0.38%	0.48%
Native Hawaiian or Pacific Islander alone (NH)	x	x	14	7	20	x	x	0.02%	0.01%	0.03%
Other race alone (NH)	80	24	78	106	196	0.12%	0.03%	0.11%	0.14%	0.25%
Mixed race or Multiracial (NH)	x	x	835	1,514	3,578	x	x	1.14%	1.94%	4.64%
Hispanic or Latino (any race)	290	346	429	748	1,031	0.45%	0.50%	0.58%	0.96%	1.34%
Total	65,004	69,330	73,345	78,064	77,093	100.00%	100.00%	100.00%	100.00%	100.00%

=== 2010 census ===
As of the 2010 United States census, there were 78,064 people, 28,919 households, and 19,782 families in the county. The population density was 113 people per square mile (44 people/km^{2}). There were 32,148 housing units at an average density of 46.6 units per square mile (18.0/km^{2}). The racial makeup of the county was 90.7% white, 6.2% black or African American, 0.4% Asian, 0.3% American Indian, 0.3% from other races, and 2.1% from two or more races. Those of Hispanic or Latino origin made up 1.0% of the population. In terms of ancestry, 27.0% were German, 15.2% were Irish, 12.5% were American, and 10.5% were English.

Of the 28,919 households, 32.8% had children under the age of 18 living with them, 50.2% were married couples living together, 12.6% had a female householder with no husband present, 31.6% were non-families, and 26.2% of all households were made up of individuals. The average household size was 2.48 and the average family size was 2.95. The median age was 39.8 years.

The median income for a household in the county was $42,626 and the median income for a family was $50,081. Males had a median income of $42,721 versus $32,374 for females. The per capita income for the county was $20,595. About 13.1% of families and 17.3% of the population were below the poverty line, including 24.7% of those under age 18 and 8.2% of those age 65 or over.

=== 2000 census ===
As of the 2000 United States census, there were 73,345 people, 27,136 households, and 19,185 families in the county. The population density was 106 people per square mile (41 people/km^{2}). There were 29,461 housing units at an average density of 42.7 units per square mile (16.5/km^{2}). The racial makeup of the county was 91.74% White, 6.20% Black or African American, 0.31% Native American, 0.35% Asian, 0.02% Pacific Islander, 0.19% from other races, and 1.20% from two or more races. 0.58% of the population were Hispanic or Latino of any race.

There were 27,136 households, out of which 32.70% had children under the age of 18 living with them, 55.20% were married couples living together, 11.10% had a female householder with no husband present, and 29.30% were non-families. 24.90% of all households were made up of individuals, and 10.30% had someone living alone who was 65 years of age or older. The average household size was 2.50 and the average family size was 2.97.

The county population contained 24.00% under the age of 18, 8.60% from 18 to 24, 31.60% from 25 to 44, 23.60% from 45 to 64, and 12.20% who were 65 years of age or older. The median age was 37 years. For every 100 females there were 108.30 males. For every 100 females age 18 and over, there were 109.00 males.

The median income for a household in the county was $37,117, and the median income for a family was $43,241. Males had a median income of $35,892 versus $23,399 for females. The per capita income for the county was $17,569. About 9.10% of families and 12.00% of the population were below the poverty line, including 15.10% of those under age 18 and 10.20% of those age 65 or over.

== Government ==
=== County officials ===
County officials are (as of October 2024):

- County Auditor Jeff Lehner
- County Board of Elections
  - Traci Henness, Director
  - Jessica Ott, Deputy Director
  - Beth Neal, Chair
  - Eric Rinehart, Member
  - Doug Corcoran, Member
  - Philip Gray, Member
- Clerk of Courts Jordan Wheeler
- Board of Commissioners
  - James "Oody" Lowe
  - Jack Everson
  - David Glass
- Ross County Court of Common Pleas:
  - Judge Michael M. Ater
  - Judge Matthew Schmidt
  - Probate and Juvenile Court Judge J. Jeffrey Benson
  - Magistrate John Di Cesare
- County Coroner Ben Trotter
- County Engineer Charles R. Ortman
- County Prosecutor Jeffrey C. Marks
- County Recorder Anthony “Major” Maughmer
- County Treasurer David Jeffers
- County Sheriff George W. Lavender

== Politics ==
Ross is a generally Republican county in Presidential and Congressional elections, although until recent years, Democratic candidates performed fairly well in the county. The last Democrat to win a majority in the county was Lyndon Johnson in 1964, while Bill Clinton won a plurality in 1996 and Barack Obama came within just 439 votes in 2012.

Ross is part of Ohio's 2nd congressional district, which is represented by Republican David Taylor.

United States presidential election results for Ross County, Ohio
Year	Republican		Democratic		Third party(ies)	
Year	No.	%	No.	%	No.	%
1856	2,436	42.69%	2,681	46.99%	589	10.32%
1860	3,043	47.35%	2,806	43.67%	577	8.98%
1864	3,380	51.34%	3,204	48.66%	0	0.00%
1868	3,230	46.98%	3,645	53.02%	0	0.00%
1872	3,650	49.55%	3,711	50.38%	5	0.07%
1876	4,177	48.41%	4,431	51.35%	21	0.24%
1880	4,734	50.81%	4,551	48.85%	32	0.34%
1884	4,830	50.30%	4,723	49.18%	50	0.52%
1888	4,942	50.70%	4,584	47.03%	221	2.27%
1892	4,632	49.19%	4,489	47.67%	296	3.14%
1896	5,562	52.32%	4,967	46.73%	101	0.95%
1900	5,463	51.61%	5,035	47.56%	88	0.83%
1904	5,472	54.60%	4,387	43.77%	163	1.63%
1908	5,432	49.69%	5,325	48.71%	174	1.59%
1912	3,600	36.76%	4,494	45.89%	1,698	17.34%
1916	4,857	47.76%	5,154	50.68%	159	1.56%
1920	9,330	56.46%	7,063	42.74%	133	0.80%
1924	8,431	53.86%	6,028	38.51%	1,194	7.63%
1928	11,179	64.59%	6,062	35.02%	67	0.39%
1932	9,575	47.34%	10,542	52.12%	110	0.54%
1936	9,817	43.75%	12,503	55.71%	121	0.54%
1940	11,780	48.62%	12,447	51.38%	0	0.00%
1944	11,424	53.50%	9,928	46.50%	0	0.00%
1948	10,398	52.08%	9,524	47.71%	42	0.21%
1952	13,431	61.01%	8,585	38.99%	0	0.00%
1956	13,036	63.73%	7,418	36.27%	0	0.00%
1960	14,075	60.90%	9,036	39.10%	0	0.00%
1964	9,623	43.10%	12,704	56.90%	0	0.00%
1968	11,284	50.72%	6,873	30.90%	4,089	18.38%
1972	15,573	71.15%	5,879	26.86%	436	1.99%
1976	11,477	50.45%	10,743	47.22%	531	2.33%
1980	13,251	55.54%	9,355	39.21%	1,253	5.25%
1984	17,015	66.60%	8,020	31.39%	513	2.01%
1988	14,563	60.39%	9,271	38.45%	279	1.16%
1992	10,825	39.84%	10,452	38.46%	5,896	21.70%
1996	10,286	39.87%	12,649	49.03%	2,862	11.09%
2000	13,706	52.68%	11,662	44.83%	648	2.49%
2004	17,231	54.41%	13,978	44.14%	462	1.46%
2008	16,759	52.49%	14,455	45.28%	711	2.23%
2012	15,008	49.76%	14,569	48.31%	583	1.93%
2016	18,652	61.02%	10,356	33.88%	1,557	5.09%
2020	22,278	66.77%	10,557	31.64%	530	1.59%
2024	22,801	68.96%	9,846	29.78%	418	1.26%

United States Senate election results for Ross County, Ohio1
Year	Republican		Democratic		Third party(ies)	
Year	No.	%	No.	%	No.	%
2024	20,402	62.42%	11,125	34.03%	1,160	3.55%

== Education ==
=== School districts ===
School districts covering portions of Ross County include:

- Adena Local School District
- Chillicothe City School District
- Greenfield Exempted Village School District
- Huntington Local School District
- Logan Elm Local School District
- Miami Trace Local School District
- Paint Valley Local School District
- Southeastern Local School District
- Union-Scioto Local School District
- Waverly City School District
- Zane Trace Local School District

=== Pickaway-Ross Career & Technology Center ===
Pickaway-Ross lies in the Northern part of the county. Students from the following affiliated Ross and Pickaway county districts attend the vocational school:

- Adena Local School District (Ross County)
- Chillicothe City School District (Ross County)
- Huntington Local School District (Ross County)
- Paint Valley Local School District (Ross County)
- Southeastern Local School District (Ross County)
- Unioto Local School District (Ross County)
- Zane Trace Local School District (Ross County)
- Circleville City School District (Pickaway County)
- Logan Elm Local School District (Pickaway County)
- Westfall Local School District (Pickaway County)

=== Ohio University Chillicothe ===
Ohio University established a regional campus in Chillicothe in 1966. The university has over 2,500 students enrolled as of 2010, ranging from traditional-aged students and non-traditional learners.

== Transportation ==
The Ross County Airport is located six nautical miles (6.9 mi; 11 km) northwest of Chillicothe's central business district.

== Communities ==
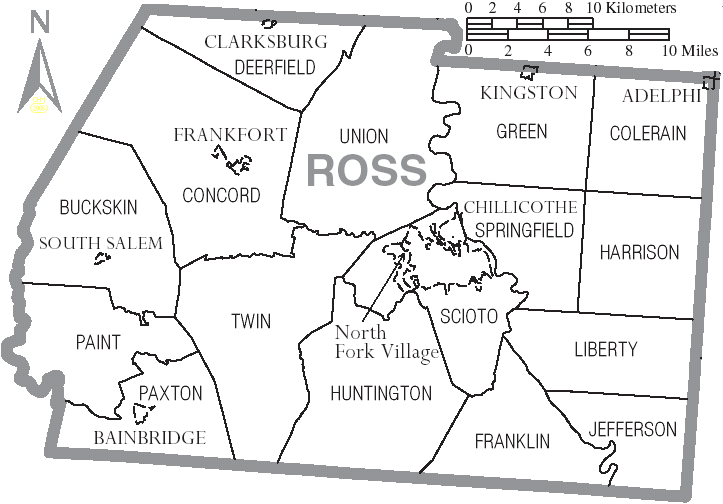
Map of Ross County, Ohio With Municipal and Township Labels

=== City ===
- Chillicothe (county seat)

=== Villages ===
- Adelphi
- Bainbridge
- Clarksburg
- Frankfort
- Kingston
- South Salem

=== Census-designated places ===
- Andersonville
- Bourneville
- Massieville
- Richmond Dale or Richmondale

=== Unincorporated communities ===
- Alma
- Anderson
- Austin
- Brownsville
- Denver
- Fruitdale
- Greenland
- Hallsville
- Harper
- Higby
- Hopetown
- Humboldt
- Ingham
- Kinnikinnick
- Knockemstiff
- Lattaville
- Lickskillet
- Londonderry
- Lyndon
- Metzger
- Mooresville
- Musselman
- Nipgen
- North Fork Village
- Pleasant Grove
- Pleasant Valley
- Pride
- Renick
- Renick Junction
- Roxabell
- Schooley
- Slate Mills
- Spargursville
- Storms
- Summithill
- Tucson
- Vigo
- Yellowbud

=== Townships ===
- Buckskin
- Colerain
- Concord
- Deerfield
- Franklin
- Green
- Harrison
- Huntington
- Jefferson
- Liberty
- Paint
- Paxton
- Scioto
- Springfield
- Twin
- Union

== Notable people ==
- Clyde Beatty (1903–1965) – lion tamer and animal trainer
- Blue Jacket (1743–1810) – Shawnee War Chief
- William Granville Cochran (1844–1932) – Illinois state judge and legislator
- Esther Housh (1840–1898) – social reformer, author, editor
- Donald Ray Pollock (1954) – author
- John Purdue (1802–1876) – founding benefactor of Purdue University
- Frederick Madison Roberts (1879–1952) – great-grandson of Sally Hemings and Thomas Jefferson, first African-American elected to office on the West Coast (elected to California Assembly in 1918), and "dean of the assembly" who helped found the University of California at Los Angeles.
- Tecumseh (1768–1813) – Native American Shawnee Leader

== See also ==
- National Register of Historic Places listings in Ross County, Ohio
