= Grandview Cemetery (Chillicothe, Ohio) =

Cemetery in Ohio, US

- U.S. National Register of Historic Places
- U.S. Historic district
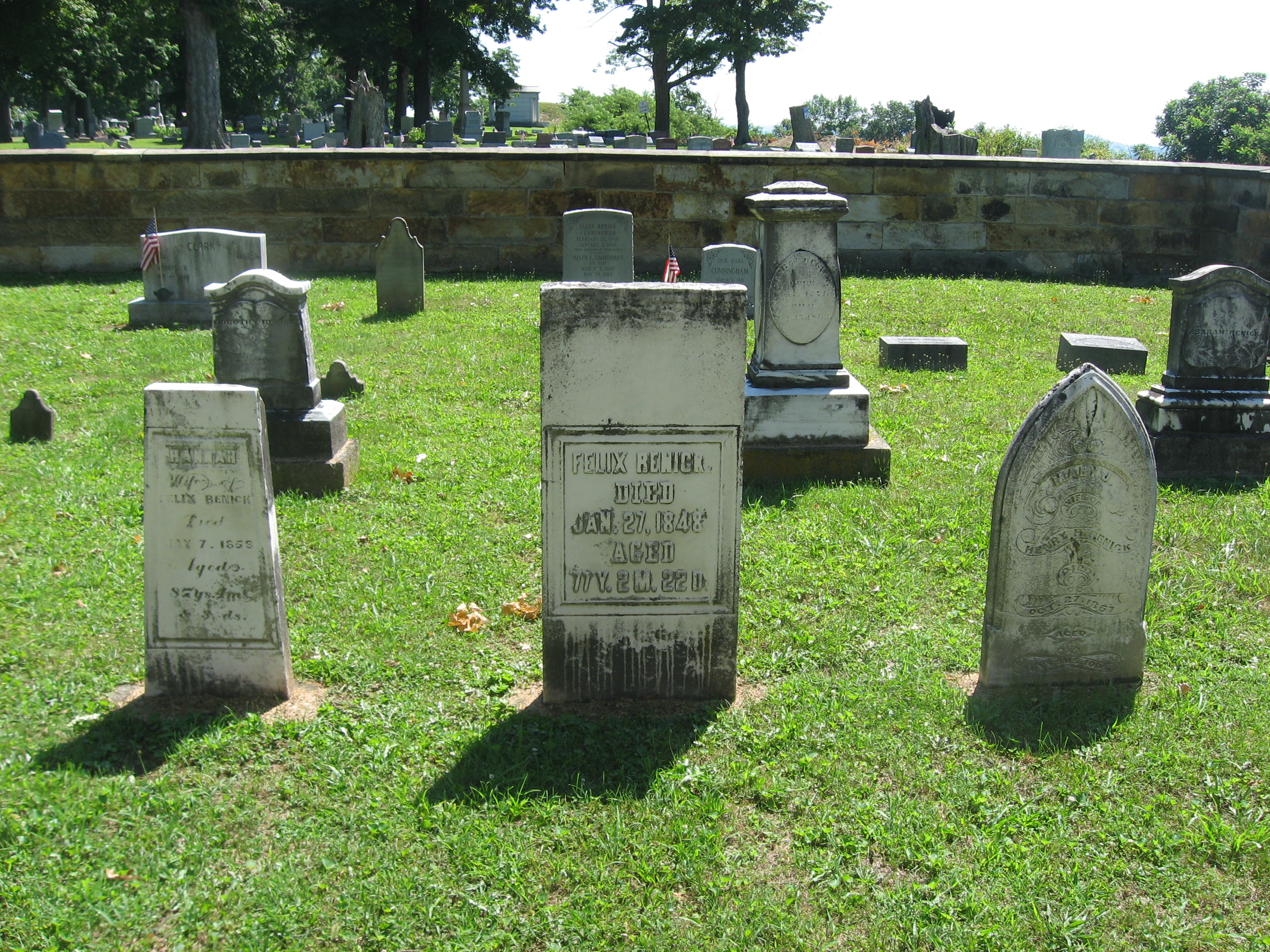
- A group of gravestones in the old section of Grandview Cemetery

- Location within Ohio Location within the United States
- Location: 240 S. Walnut St., Chillicothe, Ohio
- Coordinates: 39°19′28″N 82°59′10″W
- Area: 91.6 acres (37.1 ha)
- Built: 1845
- Architectural style: Mid 19th Century Revival, Late 19th and 20th Century Revivals, Romanesque
- NRHP reference No.: 78002180
- Added to NRHP: December 19, 1978

Grandview Cemetery is a cemetery in Chillicothe, Ohio.

== About ==
Grandview Cemetery (originally spelled Grand View as two words) was established around 1841. The ground the cemetery stands on looks down upon the valleys of the Scioto River and Paint Creek, with a panoramic view of the city of Chillicothe. The land for Grandview was purchased outside of the city limits of Chillicothe in order to provide a more restful setting for the new cemetery (one of the burial grounds it replaced later became the site of a railroad depot).

Grandview Cemetery was added to the National Register of Historic Places in 1978.

== Notable burials ==
- William Allen (governor)
- Henry Holcomb Bennett
- Harold Kile Claypool
- Horatio Clifford Claypool
- William Creighton, Jr.
- Edwin H. Davis
- Lewis Deschler
- Albert Douglas
- Richard Enderlin
- Joseph Scott Fullerton
- Dard Hunter
- William A. Ireland
- Nathaniel Massie
- Duncan McArthur
- Joseph Miller
- Lawrence Talbot Neal
- Noel Sickles
- Joshua Woodrow Sill
- Burton E. Stevenson
- Edward Tiffin
- Carey Trimble
- John Inskeep Vanmeter
- Thomas Worthington (governor)
- One British Commonwealth war grave, of Captain Charles H. Becker of the East Surrey Regiment of World War I.
