= George Turner (judge) =

George Turner (c. 1750 – March 16, 1843) was an English-born soldier, land speculator, and jurist from South Carolina.

Little is known about Turner's personal life. In the American Revolutionary War (1775–1783), he served in the 1st South Carolina Regiment of the Continental Army, rising to the rank of captain. He was taken prisoner by the British at the siege of Charleston on 12 May 1780. He was later exchanged, and brevetted a major at the end of the war.

Turner moved to Philadelphia after the war. A member of the Society of the Cincinnati, he was secretary of their second general meeting, held in Philadelphia in May 1787. Turner was the likely author of a set of "strictures on the proposed Constitution" which were published anonymously in the Freeman's Journal on September 26, 1787. The article was the first criticism of the proposed Constitution to be distributed publicly in the United States.

Turner became a member of the American Philosophical Society in January 1790. He wrote several works on various subjects.

As a prominent land speculator, Turner had a vested interest in seeing a stable government established in the newly acquired Northwest Territory. In 1789, he was appointed by the Washington administration as a judge of the Northwest Territory to replace the deceased James Mitchell Varnum. With Governor Arthur St. Clair and Judge John Cleves Symmes, in May 1795 Turner helped draft Maxwell's Code (named after its printer, William Maxwell), the first criminal and civil legal code for the Northwest Territory.

In October 1794, Turner became the first territorial judge to hold court in what is now Illinois. His actions as judge were seen as high-handed by many of the residents of St. Clair County, who had previously been independent of the federal judiciary. In May 1796, residents sent a petition with 49 names to the U.S. House of Representatives, asking for Judge Turner's removal. The House considered but did not pursue impeachment proceedings against Turner. Had they proceeded it would have been the first impeachment of a U.S. federal judge. Turner resigned over the winter of 1797–1798 and was replaced as territorial judge by Return J. Meigs, Jr.

Turner returned to Philadelphia in 1833, where he died ten years later. His obituary appeared in the 1844 edition of American Almanac and Repository of Useful Knowledge, which compiled a list of notable 1843 deaths. It read:

March 17. — In Philadelphia, Penn., Hon. George Turner, aged 93. Mr Turner was a native of England, but joined the American army on the breaking out of the revolutionary war; he was a Captain in the service, and commanded in South Carolina, and distinguished himself in several severe engagements, especially in the affair generally known, from the fatal effects of the courage and perseverance on both sides, as the "Slaughter Pens." He was the personal friend of Washington.

== Works ==
- Turner George. Memoir on the extraneous fossils, denominated mammoth bones; principally designed to shew, that they are the remains of more than one species of non-descript animal: by George Turner, member of the American Philosophical Society held at Philadelphia, honorary and corresponding member of the Bath and West of England Society, &c. Philadelphia: Printed for Thomas Dobson, at the stone house, no. 41, South Second Street, 1799.
- Turner, George. Oration pronounced before the Washington Benevolent Society of the county of Washington, State of Ohio: on the 22d. February, 1817. Marietta, [Ohio], 1817.
- Turner, George. "Remarks on Certain Articles found in an Indian Tumulus at Cincinnati, and now deposited in the Museum of the American Philosophical Society." Transactions of the American Philosophical Society, Vol. V, p. 74.
- Turner, George. Traits of Indian character; as generally applicable to the aborigines of North America.... Philadelphia: Key & Biddle, 1836.
