= 73rd Ohio Infantry Regiment =

- Active: December 30, 1861, to July 20, 1865
- Country: United States
- Allegiance: Union
- Branch: Infantry
- Engagements: Battle of McDowell; Battle of Cross Keys; Second Battle of Bull Run; Battle of Chancellorsville; Gettysburg campaign; Battle of Gettysburg; Battle of Wauhatchie; Chattanooga campaign; Battle of Missionary Ridge; Atlanta campaign; Battle of Resaca; Battle of Dallas; Battle of New Hope Church; Battle of Allatoona; Battle of Kennesaw Mountain; Battle of Peachtree Creek; Siege of Atlanta; Sherman's March to the Sea; Carolinas campaign; Battle of Bentonville

The 73rd Ohio Infantry Regiment, sometimes 73rd Ohio Volunteer Infantry (or 73rd OVI) was an infantry regiment in the Union Army during the American Civil War.

== Service ==
The 73rd Ohio Infantry was organized in Chillicothe, Ohio and mustered in for three years service on December 30, 1861, under the command of Colonel Orland Smith.

The regiment was attached to Cheat Mountain, District Western Virginia, to March 1862. Schenck's Brigade, Department of the Mountains, to June 1862. 2nd Brigade, 1st Division, I Corps, Army of Virginia, to September 1862. 2nd Brigade, 1st Division, XI Corps, Army of the Potomac, to October 1862. 2nd Brigade, 2nd Division, XI Corps, Army of the Potomac, to October 1863, and Army of the Cumberland, to April 1864. 3rd Brigade, 3rd Division, XX Corps, Army of the Cumberland, to July 1865.

The 73rd Ohio Infantry mustered out of service at Louisville, Kentucky, on July 20, 1865.

=== Detailed service ===
The 73rd OVI's detailed service is as follows (NOTE — Battles are Bolded, Italicized; campaigns are Italicized):

==== 1862 ====
- Duty at Camp Logan until January 24, 1862.
- Moved to Grafton, Va., then to Fetterman January 24–26
- New Creek February 3.
- Expedition to Romney, Va., February 6–7, 1862,
- Moorefield February 12–16.
- Moved to Clarksburg February 18, and duty there until March 20.
- Moved to Weston, Va., March 20, and duty there until April 10.
- Moved to Join Milroy at Monterey.
- **Battle of McDowell** May 8.
- Woodstock June 2.
- Mt. Jackson June 3.
- New Market June 4.
- Harrisonburg June 6.
- **Battle of Cross Keys** June 8.
- At Middletown until July 7, and at Sperryville until August 8.
- Expedition to Madison Court House July 16–19.
- Pope's Campaign in Northern Virginia August 16 to September 2.
- **Battle of Freeman's Ford** August 22.
- **Battle of Second Bull Run** August 29–30.
- Duty In the defenses of Washington, D.C., until December.
- Reconnaissance to Bristoe Station and Warrenton Junction September 25–28.
- March to Fredericksburg, Va., December 12–16.

==== 1863 ====
- "Mud March" January 20–24, 1863.
- At Falmouth until April 27.
- Chancellorsville Campaign April 27 – May 6.
- **Battle of Chancellorsville** May 1–5.
- Gettysburg campaign June 11 – July 24.
- **Battle of Gettysburg** July 1–3.
- Pursuit of Lee to Manassas Gap, Va., July 5–24.
- Camp at Bristoe until September 24.
- Moved to Bridgeport, Ala., September 24 – October 3.
- Duty at Bridgeport and Stevenson, Ala., until October 24.
- Reopening Tennessee River October 24–29.
- **Battle of Wauhatchie**, Tenn., October 28–29.
- Chattanooga-Ringgold Campaign November 23–27.
- Orchard Knob November 23.
- Tunnel Hill November 24–25.
- **Battle of Missionary Ridge** November 25.
- March to relief of Knoxville, Tenn., November 28 – December 17.

==== 1864 ====
- Regiment reenlisted January 1, 1864, and veterans on furlough until March.
- Atlanta campaign May 1 – September 8.
- Demonstrations on Rocky Faced Ridge May 8–11.
- Buzzard's Roost Gap May 8–9.
- **Battle of Resaca** May 14–15.
- Cassville May 19.
- **Battle of New Hope Church** May 25.
- Operations on line of Pumpkin Vine Creek and battles about Dallas, New Hope Church, and Allatoona Hills May 25 – June 5.
- Operations about Marietta and Kennesaw Mountain June 10 – July 2.
- Pine Hill June 11–14.
- Lost Mountain June 15–17.
- Gilgal or Golgotha Church June 15.
- Muddy Creek June 17.
- Noyes Creek June 19.
- Kolb's Farm June 22.
- **Battle of Kennesaw Mountain** June 27.
- Ruff's Station July 4.
- Chattahoochee River July 5–17.
- **Battle of Peachtree Creek** July 19–20.
- Siege of Atlanta July 22 – August 25.
- Operations at Chattahoochie River Bridge August 26 – September 2.
- Occupation of Atlanta September 2 – November 15.
- March to the Sea November 15.
- Siege of Savannah December 10–21.

==== 1865 ====
- Campaign of the Carolinas January to April 1865.
- Lawtonville, S.C., February 2.
- Reconnaissance on Goldsboro Road, N.C., March 14.
- Taylor's Hole Creek, **Battle of Averysboro**, March 16.
- **Battle of Bentonville** March 19–21.
- Occupation of Goldsboro March 24.
- Advance on Raleigh April 10–14.
- Occupation of Raleigh April 14.
- Bennett's House April 26.
- Surrender of Johnston and his army.
- March to Washington, D.C., via Richmond, Va., April 29 – May 20.
- Grand Review of the Armies May 24.
- Moved to Louisville, Ky., June and duty there until July.

== Casualties ==
The regiment lost a total of 321 men during service; 4 officers and 167 enlisted men killed or mortally wounded, 1 officer and 149 enlisted men died of disease.

== Commanders ==
- Colonel Orland Smith - resigned February 17, 1864
- Lieutenant Colonel Richard Long – commanded at Battle of McDowell as major; commanded at Battle of Gettysburg
- Colonel Samuel H. Hurst – commanded during Chattanooga Campaign

== Notable members ==
- Musician Richard Enderlin, Company B – Medal of Honor recipient for actions at the battle of Gettysburg, July 1–3, 1863
- George Nixon was the great grandfather of Richard Nixon and died from the wounds he received in the Battle of Gettysburg Pa. He is buried in the Ohio section of the National Cemetery.
- Samuel R. Peters later served in the United States House from 1883 to 1891. He represented the 7th District in Kansas.
- Archibald Lybrand Jr. later served as Mayor of Delaware, Ohio and the United States House from 1897 to 1901. He represented the 8th District in Ohio.

== See also ==
- List of Ohio Civil War units
- Ohio in the Civil War
