= Thomas Scott (Ohio judge) =

American judge

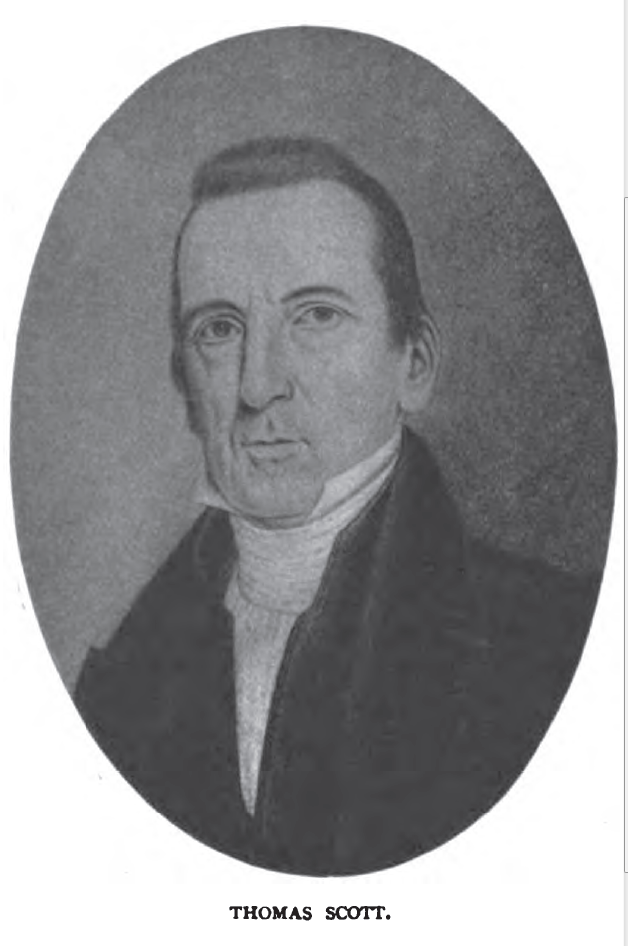

Associate Justice of the Ohio Supreme Court
- In office January 17, 1809 – July 25, 1815
- Preceded by: Samuel Huntington
- Succeeded by: Jessup Nash Couch

Member of the Ohio House of Representatives from the Ross County district
- In office December 4, 1815 – December 1, 1816 Serving with James Barnes; Duncan McArthur
- Preceded by: John McDougall; Samuel Swearingen; James Barnes
- Succeeded by: William Vance; James Menary; James Barnes

Personal details
- Born: October 31, 1772 Maryland
- Died: February 13, 1856 (aged 83) Chillicothe, Ohio
- Resting place: Grandview Cemetery
- Party: Democratic-Republican
- Spouse: Catherine Wood
- Children: Eight

Thomas Scott (October 31, 1772 – February 13, 1856) was Clerk of the Ohio State Senate from 1803 to 1809 and an Ohio Supreme Court Judge from 1809 to 1816.

Thomas Scott was born at Oldtown, Frederick (now Allegany) County, Maryland. At age eighteen, he was ordained to preach in the Methodist church and, in 1793, was placed in charge of the Ohio circuit. In May 1796, he married Catherine Wood. He learned the art of tailoring and studied law under James Brown of Lexington, Kentucky. He practiced in Flemingsburgh, Kentucky in 1799 and 1800.

Scott came to Chillicothe, Ohio early in 1801 and was licensed to practice in June 1801. He was Clerk of the Northwest Territory Legislature that winter. In November, 1802, he was secretary at the State Constitutional Convention. He was first justice of the peace in Ross County, and was clerk of the Ohio Senate 1803–1809. He was Prosecuting Attorney of Ross County, 1804 and 1805.

In 1809, Scott was chosen Judge of the Ohio Supreme Court, serving until he resigned on July 25, 1815. He was elected to the Ohio House of Representatives in 1815, and did not seek re-election. Scott was a Whig until Henry Clay blocked his appointment as Federal District Judge. He then became a Democrat, remaining so until the candidacy of General Harrison in 1840, after which he returned to the Whigs.

From 1829 to 1845, Scott served as register of public lands at the Chillicothe Federal Land Office. When he died February 13, 1856, at Chillicothe, he had been active as a lawyer longer than anyone in Ohio, and "probably, longer a preacher of the gospel than any other minister in the United States." He is buried at Grandview Cemetery.

== See also ==
- List of justices of the Ohio Supreme Court

== Notes ==
Ohio Senate
Preceded by William C. Schenck	Clerk of the Senate; 1803-1809	Succeeded by Isaiah Morris
