= Henry Holcomb Bennett =

American author, journalist, and poet

Henry Holcomb Bennett (December 5, 1863 – April 30, 1924) was an American writer, journalist, and poet.

== Biography ==
Bennett was born in Chillicothe, Ohio on December 5, 1863. He attended Kenyon College and graduated in 1886. He moved to Kansas for a time before returning to his home town as a journalist. He also began submitting creative writing to various newspapers and magazines.

Bennett was the author of poems such as "A Desert Love Song" (Munsey's Aug. 1902) and "Gangway! Gangway", (National Magazine Mar. 1901) and the short stories "The Face of Ompah" (National Magazine June 1900) and "A Glorious Privilege", (National Magazine Nov. 1900) but remains best known as the author of the popular patriotic poem, "Hats Off – The Flag Goes By".

It was first published in The Youth's Companion on January 13, 1898. It was collected in An American Anthology in 1900, edited by Edmund Clarence Stedman (1833–1908). The poem was also published in The Young and Field Reader, Book Five, Boston, Ginn and Company, c. 1915, submitted by Ross I. Morrison, Sr and Woman's World in July 1919. It was soon published and sung widely—especially on the 4th of July. Years later, poet E. E. Cummings recited the poem at his class's commencement.

Bennett is buried in Grandview Cemetery, Chillicothe, Ross County, Ohio, US.
