= Richard Enderlin =

American Civil War Medal of Honor recipient

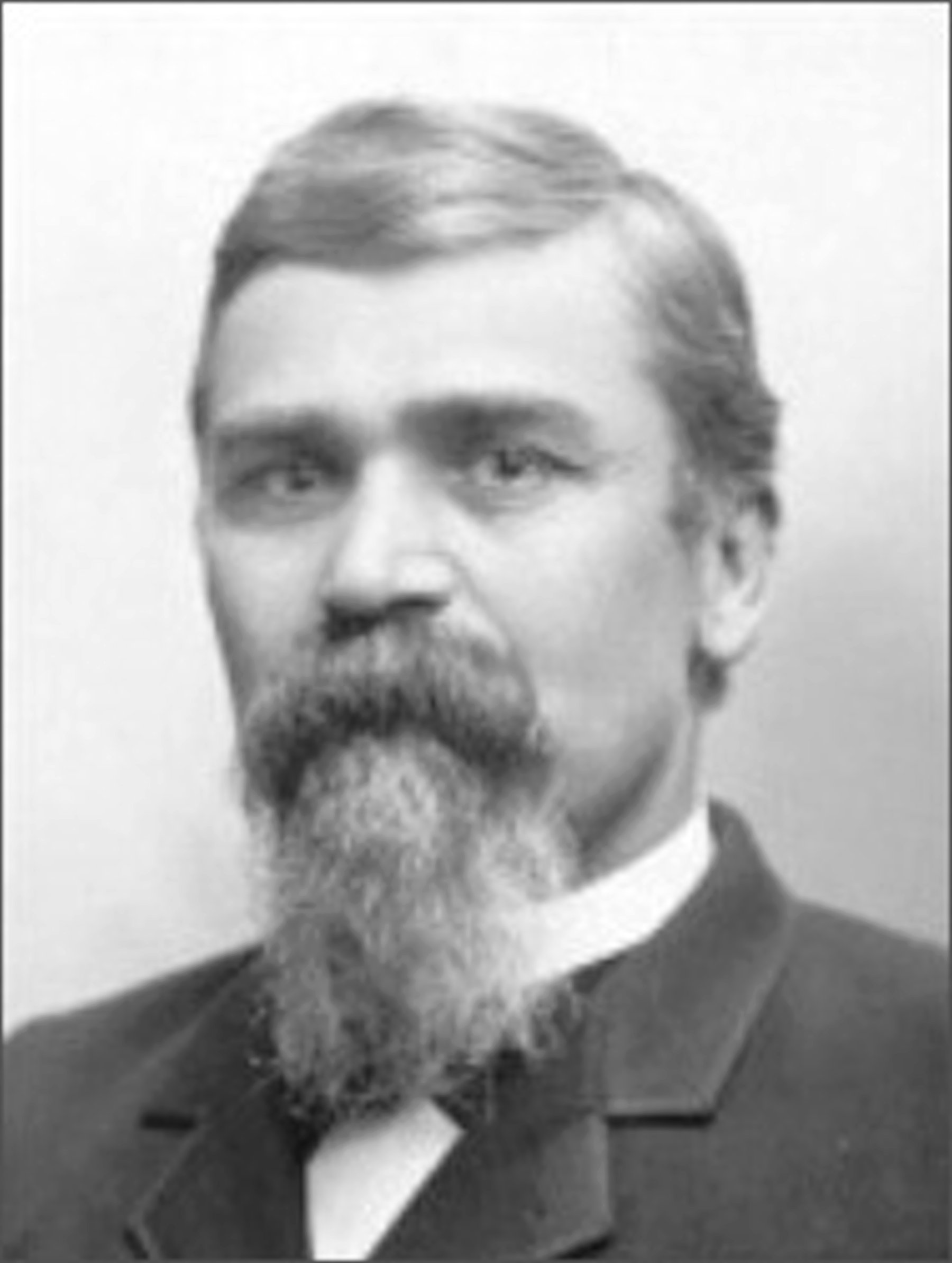
- Enderlin in 1905
- Born: January 11, 1843; Grand Duchy of Baden
- Died: February 11, 1930 (aged 87); Chillicothe, Ohio, U.S.
- Burial place: Grandview Cemetery Chillicothe
- Military career
- Allegiance: United States
- Branch: United States Army
- Service years: 1861–1865
- Rank: Musician; Sergeant
- Units: Company B, 73rd Ohio Volunteer Infantry Regiment
- Conflicts: American Civil War; *Battle of Gettysburg
- Awards: Medal of Honor

Richard Enderlin (January 11, 1843 – February 11, 1930) was a musician and United States Army soldier who received a Medal of Honor for the heroism he displayed when fighting in the Battle of Gettysburg in 1863.

== Gettysburg ==
Enderlin was born in the Grand Duchy of Baden and grew up in Chillicothe, Ohio. He enlisted in the Army in November 1861. Enderlin thought his unit was not directly engaged, so the bugler voluntarily joined the defense of Cemetery Ridge. On July 2, during combat, George Nixon III (the great-grandfather of American President Richard Nixon) was mortally wounded and was carried out of harm's way by Enderlin. For this action, he was promoted to sergeant the next day, and received the Medal of Honor on September 11, 1897.

Enderlin was later wounded in his right foot at the Battle of Dallas, and served in the Veteran Reserve Corps until his discharge in May 1865.

Enderlin is buried at Grandview Cemetery, Chillicothe, Ross County, Ohio, US.

== Medal of Honor citation ==
Rank and organization: Musician, Company B, 73d Ohio Infantry. Place and date: At Gettysburg, Pa., 1-July 3, 1863. Entered service at: Chillicothe, Ohio. Birth: Germany. Date of issue: September 11, 1897.

Citation:

The President of the United States of America, in the name of Congress, takes pleasure in presenting the Medal of Honor to Musician Richard Enderlin, United States Army, for extraordinary heroism from 1 to 3 July 1863, while serving with Company B, 73d Ohio Infantry, in action at Gettysburg, Pennsylvania. Musician Enderlin voluntarily took a rifle and served as a soldier in the ranks during the first and second days of the battle. Voluntarily and at his own imminent peril went into the enemy's lines at night and, under a sharp fire, rescued a wounded comrade.

== See also ==
- List of Medal of Honor recipients for the Battle of Gettysburg
- List of American Civil War Medal of Honor recipients: A–F
