= Lewis Deschler =

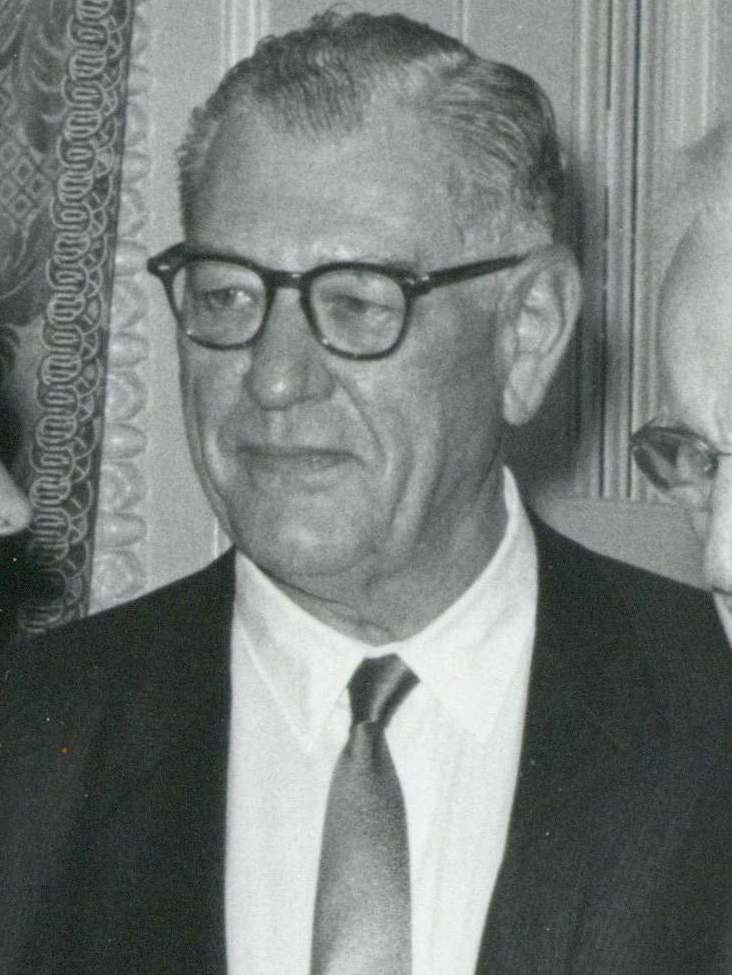

1st Parliamentarian of the United States House of Representatives
- In office January 1, 1928 – June 30, 1974
- Preceded by: Lehr Fess (Clerk at the Speaker's table)
- Succeeded by: William Holmes Brown

Personal details
- Born: March 3, 1905 Chillicothe, Ohio
- Died: July 12, 1976 (aged 71) Bethesda, Maryland
- Resting place: Grandview Cemetery
- Education: Miami University and George Washington University

Lewis Deschler (March 3, 1905 – July 12, 1976) was the first, and longest-serving, Parliamentarian of the United States House of Representatives. He started his term on January 1, 1928, during the 70th United States Congress following the retirement of Lehr Fess. Prior to the 70th Congress, the Parliamentarian position was referred to as the Clerk at the Speaker's Table.

Deschler served as the Parliamentarian from 1928 until his retirement on June 30, 1974, during the 93rd United States Congress. He was an important advisor to many congressmen during his employment, including coining the designation H.R. 1776 for the Lend-Lease act, advising House Speaker Carl Albert on the tax fraud investigation of Vice President Spiro Agnew and the impeachment of President Richard Nixon. His tenure spanned 24 Congresses and over 46 years. Deschler was the first officer to become personally influential in his own right. South Carolina Representative L. Mendel Rivers – a powerful figure in his own right who served for nearly 30 years, including as the chairman of the House Armed Services Committee during the Vietnam War – referred to Deschler as, "...the image of Congress."

Deschler was born in Chillicothe, Ohio. He went to Miami University and George Washington University. On July 12, 1976, Deschler died at the age of 71 while receiving treatment at Bethesda Naval Hospital after a series of strokes. During his retirement he resided in Bethesda, Maryland. He is buried at Grandview Cemetery in Chillicothe, Ohio, where his gravestone is shaped like the Washington Monument and prominently highlights his service as Parliamentarian.
