= Jessup Nash Couch =

American judge (1778–1821)

Justice of the Ohio Supreme Court
- In office July 25, 1815 – June 30, 1821
- Appointed by: Thomas Worthington
- Preceded by: Thomas Scott
- Succeeded by: Jacob Burnet

Personal details
- Born: August 3, 1778 Redding, Connecticut, US
- Died: June 30, 1821 (aged 42) Columbus, Ohio, US
- Education: Yale University

Jessup Nash Couch (August 3, 1778 – June 30, 1821) was an American judge who served as Justice of the Ohio Supreme Court from 1815 to 1821.

== Biography ==
Jessup Couch was born on August 3, 1778, in Redding, Connecticut, and graduated from Yale University in 1802. He came to Chillicothe, Ohio from Connecticut in 1808. He was elected to represent Ross County, Ohio in the Ohio House of Representatives for the 7th General assembly, (December, 1808 – February, 1809). Couch was a trustee of Ohio University from 1809 until 1821.

Couch was appointed July 25, 1815 by Governor Thomas Worthington to fill a vacancy on the Ohio Supreme Court caused by the resignation of Thomas Scott, until the next term would start in February 1816. He was elected to a seven-year term by the legislature, beginning February 1816. He served until his death by consumption. Couch, who never married, died June 30, 1821, aged 42, in Columbus, Ohio.
