= Burton Egbert Stevenson =

Author, anthologist, and librarian

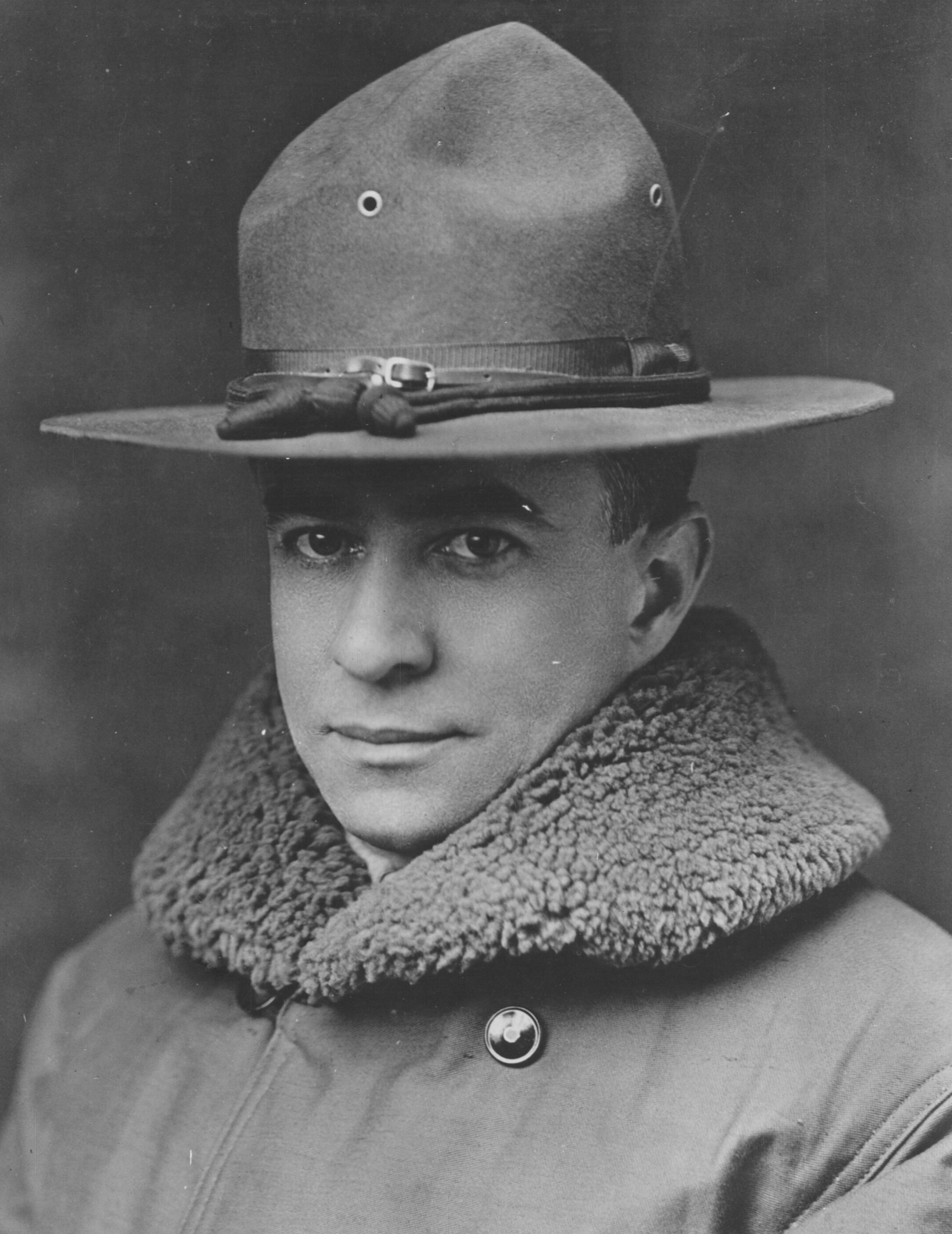
- Born: November 9, 1872
- Died: May 13, 1962 (aged 89)
- Resting place: Grandview Cemetery, Chillicothe, Ohio
- Education: Princeton University
- Occupations: Writer and librarian
- Known for: Anthologies and novels
- Spouse: Elizabeth Shepard Butler

Burton Egbert Stevenson (1872–1962) was an American author, anthologist, and librarian. He was born in Chillicothe, Ohio on 9 November 1872, and attended Princeton University 1890–1893.

== Biography ==
He married Elizabeth Shepard Butler (1869–1960) in 1895. He died 13 May 1962 and was buried in Chillicothe, Ohio.

While at Princeton, Stevenson was a correspondent for United Press and for the New York Tribune. He was city editor for the Chillicothe Daily News (1894–1898), and worked for the Daily Advertiser (1898–1899).

Stevenson became director of the Chillicothe Public Library in 1899 and held that position for 58 years. In that time, he helped secure funding for the construction of a Carnegie Library, now called the Chillicothe and Ross County Public Library.

Stevenson was well known for his war efforts. At Camp Sherman, located in Chillicothe, Ohio, he established a library of 40,000 volumes and 22 branches. The Camp Sherman library was said to be a model for national efforts to establish such libraries. In 1918, in his role as Director of French operations for the Library War Service, he helped establish what would grow to become the American Library in Paris. He was the director of this ALA outpost from 1918 until the library privatized in 1920, and returned from 1925 to 1930. He was then made European director of the American Library Association`s Library War Service, a position he held for seven years.

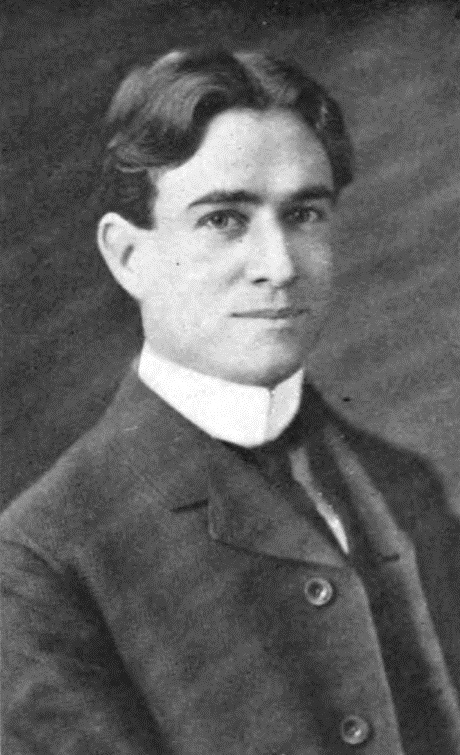

As well as being a librarian, Stevenson wrote numerous novels, including four young adult's novels, edited others' works, and created numerous anthologies of verse, familiar quotations, and the like. Many of his anthologies are still in print.

Marietta College awarded him the degree of Litt.D. in 1955. Stevenson Center at Ohio University-Chillicothe is named after him.

== Works ==
- A soldier of Virginia; a Tale of Colonel Washington and Braddock’s defeat (1901)
- Cadets of Gascony: Two stories of old France (1904)
- The Girl with the Blue Sailor (1906) (First serialized in the Ladies' Home Journal 1905 April to June issues.)
- Affairs of state; Being an account of certain surprising adventures which befell an American family in the land of windmills (1906)
- The path of honor; a Tale of war in the Bocage (1910)
- The spell of Holland: the Story of a pilgrimage to the land of dykes and windmills (1911)
- The destroyer; a Tale of international intrigue (1913)
- American men of mind (1913)
- The charm of Ireland (1914)
- The girl from Alsace; a Romance of the great war (1915). Originally published as Little Comrade.
- A king in Babylon (1917)
- The kingmakers (1922)
- The quest for the rose of Sharon (1909)
- The heritage; a Story of defeat and victory (1902)
- At odds with the regent; a Story of the cellamare conspiracy (1905)
- [The mystery of] Villa Aurelia; a Riviera interlude (1932)
- The red carnation; an Antony Bigelow story (1939)
- The clue of the red carnation (1942)

=== Detective fiction ===
- The Marathon mystery; a Story of Manhattan (1904)
- The Holladay case; a Tale (1904)
- The Affair at Elizabeth (1907)
- The mystery of the Boule cabinet; a Detective story (1911)
- The gloved hand; a Detective story (1920)
- The Storm-Center (1924)
- The house next door; a Detective story (1932)

=== Young Adult's Novels ===
- Tommy Remington's battle (1902)
- The young section-hand (1905)
- The young train dispatcher (1907)
- The young train master (1909)

=== Anthologies ===
- The home book of verse (1912)
- Poems of American history (1922)
- Great Americans as seen by the poets (1933)
- The home book of quotations; classical and modern (1934)
- The home book of Bible quotations (1949)
- The home book of proverbs, maxims, and familiar phrases (1959)
- American history in verse for boys and girls (1960)
- The home book of modern verse; an extension of the home book of verse; being a selection from American and English poetry of the twentieth century (1960)
- The home book of great poetry; a treasury of over one thousand favorite poems
- Famous single poems and the controversies which have raged around them
- The home book of verse for young folks
- The home book of Shakespeare quotations; being also a concordance & a glossary of the unique words & phrases in the plays & poems
