= Oscar F. Moore =

American politician

Oscar Fitzallen Moore
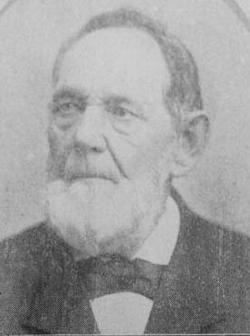

Member of the U.S. House of Representatives from Ohio's 10th district
- In office March 4, 1855 – March 3, 1857
- Preceded by: John L. Taylor
- Succeeded by: Joseph Miller

Member of the Ohio House of Representatives from the Scioto County district
- In office December 2, 1850 – January 4, 1852
- Preceded by: James Rogers
- Succeeded by: Wells A. Hutchins

Member of the Ohio Senate from the seventh district
- In office January 5, 1852 – January 1, 1854
- Preceded by: new district
- Succeeded by: Thomas McCauslin

Personal details
- Born: January 27, 1817 Lagrange, Ohio, US
- Died: June 24, 1885 (aged 68) Waverly, Ohio, US
- Resting place: Greenlawn Cemetery, Portsmouth, Ohio
- Party: Anti-Nebraska
- Education: Washington College

Military service
- Allegiance: United States
- Branch/service: Union Army
- Years of service: 1861–1864
- Rank: Colonel
- Unit: 33rd Ohio Infantry

Oscar Fitzallen Moore (January 27, 1817 – June 24, 1885) was a U.S. representative from Ohio.

Born in Lagrange, Ohio, Moore attended the public schools and Wellsburg Academy. He graduated from Washington College (now Washington & Jefferson College), in Washington, Pennsylvania, in 1836.

He then studied law. He was admitted to the bar in 1838 and commenced practice in Portsmouth, Ohio, in 1839. He served as member of the state house of representatives in 1850 and 1851. He served as member of the state senate in 1852 and 1853.

Moore was elected as an Anti-Nebraska candidate to the Thirty-fourth Congress (March 4, 1855 – March 3, 1857). He was an unsuccessful candidate for reelection in 1856 to the Thirty-fifth Congress. He served as lieutenant colonel and later as colonel of the Thirty-third Regiment, Ohio Volunteer Infantry, during the Civil War. He resumed the practice of his profession in Portsmouth, Ohio. He died at Waverly, Ohio, June 24, 1885. He was interred in Greenlawn Cemetery, Portsmouth, Ohio.

== Sources ==
- United States Congress. "Oscar F. Moore (id: M000911)". Biographical Directory of the United States Congress.

U.S. House of Representatives
Preceded by John L. Taylor	Member of the U.S. House of Representatives from Ohio's 10th congressional district 1855-1857	Succeeded by Joseph Miller

- Reid, Whitelaw (1895). "33rd Ohio Infantry". Ohio in the War Her Statesmen Generals and Soldiers. Vol. 2. Cincinnati: The Robert Clarke Company. p. 217.
