= Carey A. Trimble =

American politician

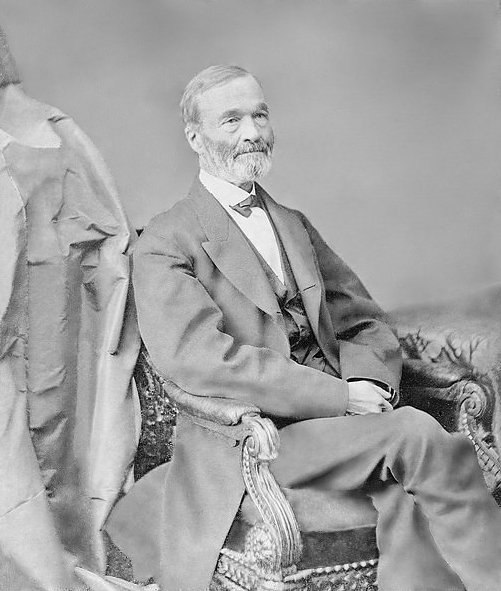

Member of the U.S. House of Representatives from Ohio's 10th district
- In office March 4, 1859 – March 3, 1863
- Preceded by: Joseph Miller
- Succeeded by: James Mitchell Ashley

Personal details
- Born: Carey Allen Trimble; September 13, 1813 Hillsboro, Ohio
- Died: May 4, 1887 (aged 73) Columbus, Ohio
- Resting place: Grandview Cemetery
- Party: Republican
- Education: Ohio University; Cincinnati Medical College
- Occupation: Physician

Carey Allen Trimble (September 13, 1813 – May 4, 1887) was an American medical doctor and politician who served two terms as a U.S. representative from Ohio from 1859 to 1863.

== Biography ==
Born in Hillsboro, Ohio, Trimble attended Pestalostian School in Philadelphia, Pennsylvania, and Stubb's Classical School in Newport, Kentucky. He graduated from Ohio University at Athens, Ohio in 1833 and from Cincinnati Medical College (now part of University of Cincinnati) in 1836. He taught for four years, and practiced medicine in Chillicothe, Ohio.

=== Congress ===
Trimble was elected as a Republican to the Thirty-sixth and Thirty-seventh Congresses (March 4, 1859 – March 3, 1863). He was an unsuccessful candidate for reelection.

=== Later career and death ===
He resumed medical practice. He moved to Columbus, Ohio, where he died May 4, 1887. He was interred in Grandview Cemetery, Chillicothe, Ohio.

== Sources ==
- United States Congress. "Carey A. Trimble (id: T000371)". Biographical Directory of the United States Congress.

U.S. House of Representatives
Preceded by Joseph Miller	Member of the U.S. House of Representatives from Ohio's 10th congressional district 1859-1863	Succeeded by James M. Ashley
