= Orland Smith =

American Union Army officer (1825–1903)

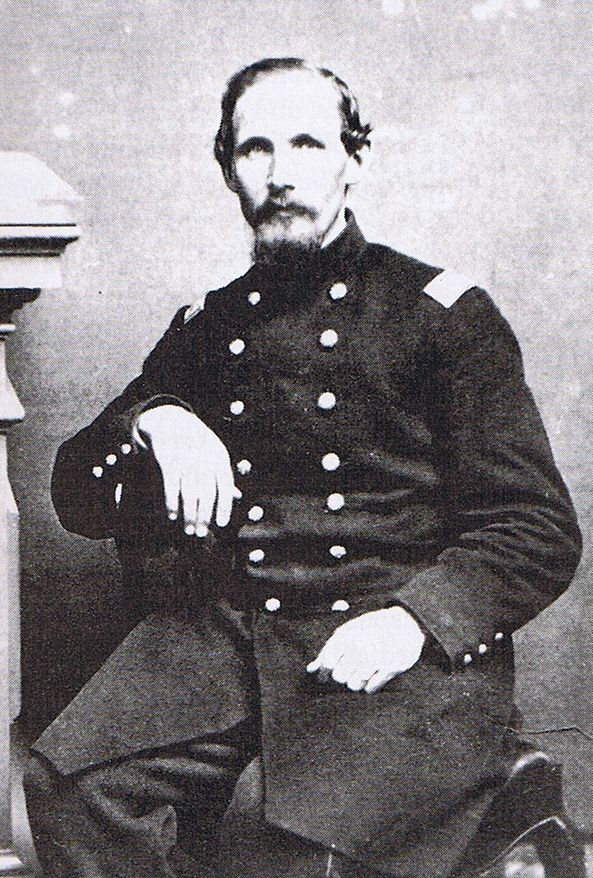
- Born: May 2, 1825; Lewiston, Maine, US
- Died: October 3, 1903 (aged 78); Chicago, Illinois, US
- Military career
- Allegiance: United States; Union
- Branch: United States Army; Union Army
- Service years: 1861–1865
- Rank: Colonel; Brevet Brigadier General
- Units: Army of the Potomac; Army of the Cumberland
- Commands: 73rd Ohio Infantry; Smith's Brigade, XI Corps
- Conflicts: American Civil War: Battle of McDowell; Battle of Cross Keys; Second Battle of Bull Run; Battle of Gettysburg; Third Battle of Chattanooga; Battle of Wauhatchie
- Other work: railroad executive

Orland Smith (May 2, 1825 – October 3, 1903) was a railroad executive and a brigade commander in the Union Army during the American Civil War. In 1863, he led a spirited bayonet charge during the Battle of Wauhatchie that took a significant Confederate position on a hill that now bears his name.

== Early life and career ==
Smith was born in New England in Lewiston, Maine. He was educated in the local schools and became a railroad agent, serving as station manager at Lewiston until 1852 when he moved to Ohio. He became an official of the Marietta and Cincinnati Railroad and settled in Chillicothe, Ohio. When the railroad fell into financial difficulties, he was appointed receiver. Smith was a lieutenant and commander of a militia company in the late 1850s, the "Chillicothe Greys."

== Civil War service ==
With the outbreak of the Civil War, Smith joined the Union army and became the colonel of the 73rd Ohio Infantry, a regiment that was raised in Chillicothe in November 1861 and trained at nearby Camp Logan. Among his volunteer soldiers was Pvt. George Nixon III, the great-grandfather of future President Richard Nixon. Smith and his regiment saw action in western Virginia, fighting at the Battle of McDowell and the Battle of Cross Keys. During the late summer, as a part of the Army of Virginia, the 73rd OVI fought at the Second Battle of Bull Run near Manassas, Virginia.

Smith assumed brigade command in the XI Corps on October 25, 1862, but he did not participate in the Battle of Chancellorsville. He returned to his command shortly before the Gettysburg campaign, after Brig. Gen. Francis C. Barlow, who had led the brigade at Chancellorsville, was given command of the 1st Division on May 24, 1863. Smith's men held Cemetery Hill on the first day of the Battle of Gettysburg at the orders of MG Oliver O. Howard, and provided an anchor for the retreating Federal soldiers. On the second day, three of Smith's regiments were engaged in heavy skirmishing in front of Cemetery Hill, and the 33rd Massachusetts, deployed between East Cemetery Hill and a knoll on the McKnight farm, helped repulse an evening attack by Col. Isaac E. Avery's North Carolina brigade.

Smith's Brigade was sent to the Western Theater in the autumn of 1863 along with the rest of the XI Corps. During the Chattanooga Campaign, Smith led his brigade in the Army of the Cumberland in a successful bayonet assault up a steep hill that now bears his name (Smith's Hill) during the Battle of Wauhatchie. In the army reorganization later that year, his brigade was disbanded and Smith returned on January 3, 1864 to the command of the 73rd OVI. He resigned his colonelcy on February 17, 1864. In the omnibus promotions at the close of the Civil War, Smith was appointed a brevet brigadier general dating from March 13, 1865.

== Postbellum career ==
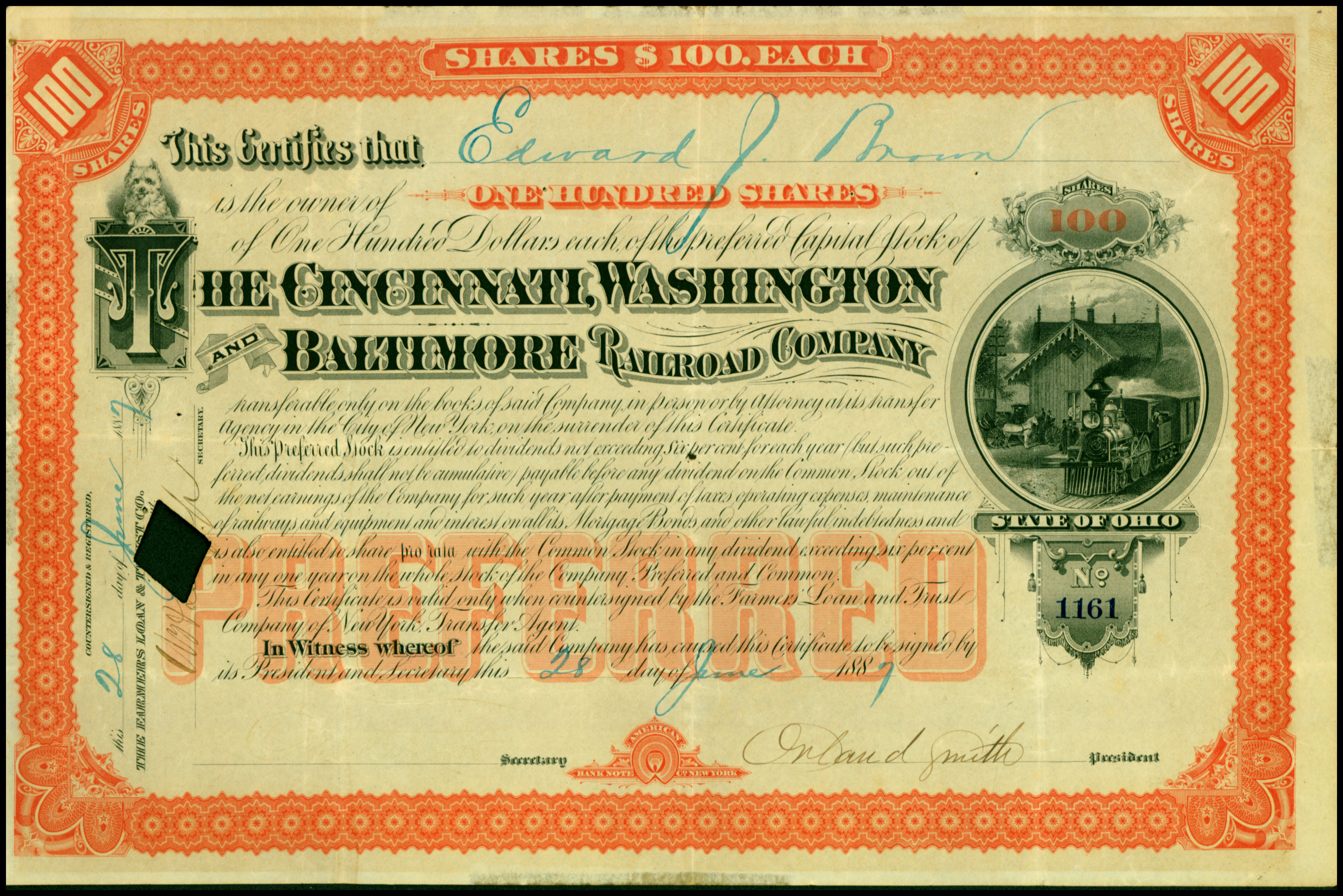
Share of the Cincinnati, Washington and Baltimore Railroad Company, issued 28. June 1887, signed by Orland Smith

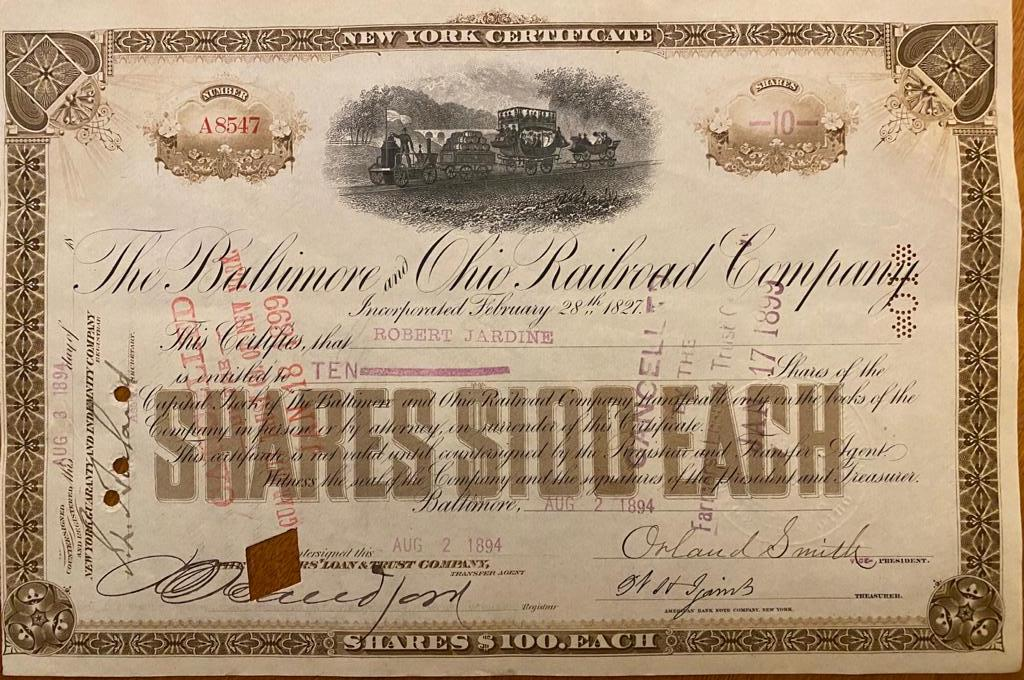
Share of the Baltimore & Ohio Railroad Company, issued 2. August 1894, signed by Orland Smith

After the war, he returned to his career as a railroad officer and became President of the Cincinnati, Washington and Baltimore Railroad and later, First Vice President of the Baltimore and Ohio Railroad, with his office in Baltimore, Maryland. From 1884 to 1899 he was President of the Columbus and Cincinnati Midland Railroad.

Smith died in Chicago, Illinois.
