= Chillicothe Gazette =

Newspaper in Ohio, US

- Type: Daily newspaper
- Format: Broadsheet
- Owner: USA Today Co.
- Founder: William Maxwell
- Founded: 1793 (as the Centinel of the Northwest Territory)
- Headquarters: 927 E. Main Street. Chillicothe, OH 45601; United States
- Circulation: 15,553 Afternoon; 15,645 Sunday (as of 2007)
- Website: chillicothegazette.com

The Chillicothe Gazette is Ohio's oldest newspaper. The daily newspaper is based in Chillicothe, Ohio, the seat of Ross County, and is owned by USA Today Co. A complete file is in the library of the Ohio Historical Society in Cincinnati.

== History ==
On November 9, 1793, William Maxwell published the first edition of The Centinel of the Northwest Territory, a weekly newspaper in Cincinnati. It was the first paper published in the Northwest Territory.

Subscription was "250 cents" per annum, and 7 cents a single copy. The motto of the Centinel: "Open to all Parties -- but influenced by none," expressed the publisher's aims: to afford an isolated community a medium to make known its varied wants and to record local happenings, as well as those of the outside world.

The newspaper was published weekly until June 1796, when it was sold to Edmund Freeman who merged it with Freeman's Journal. Around 1800, the paper moved to Chillicothe, Ohio, when the government of the Northwest Territory relocated to that city

The paper eventually assumed the name The Chillicothe Gazette. In 1935, Speidel Newspapers acquired the paper, followed by the Chillicothe News-Advertiser in 1938, which was consolidated into the Gazettee. Speidel merged with Gannett in 1976. Gannett sold the paper in the 1990s to Community Newspaper Holdings, who in turn sold to The Thomson Corporation. When Thomson exited the newspaper business in the late 1990s, Gannett bought it back.
