= Joseph Miller (Ohio politician) =

American politician

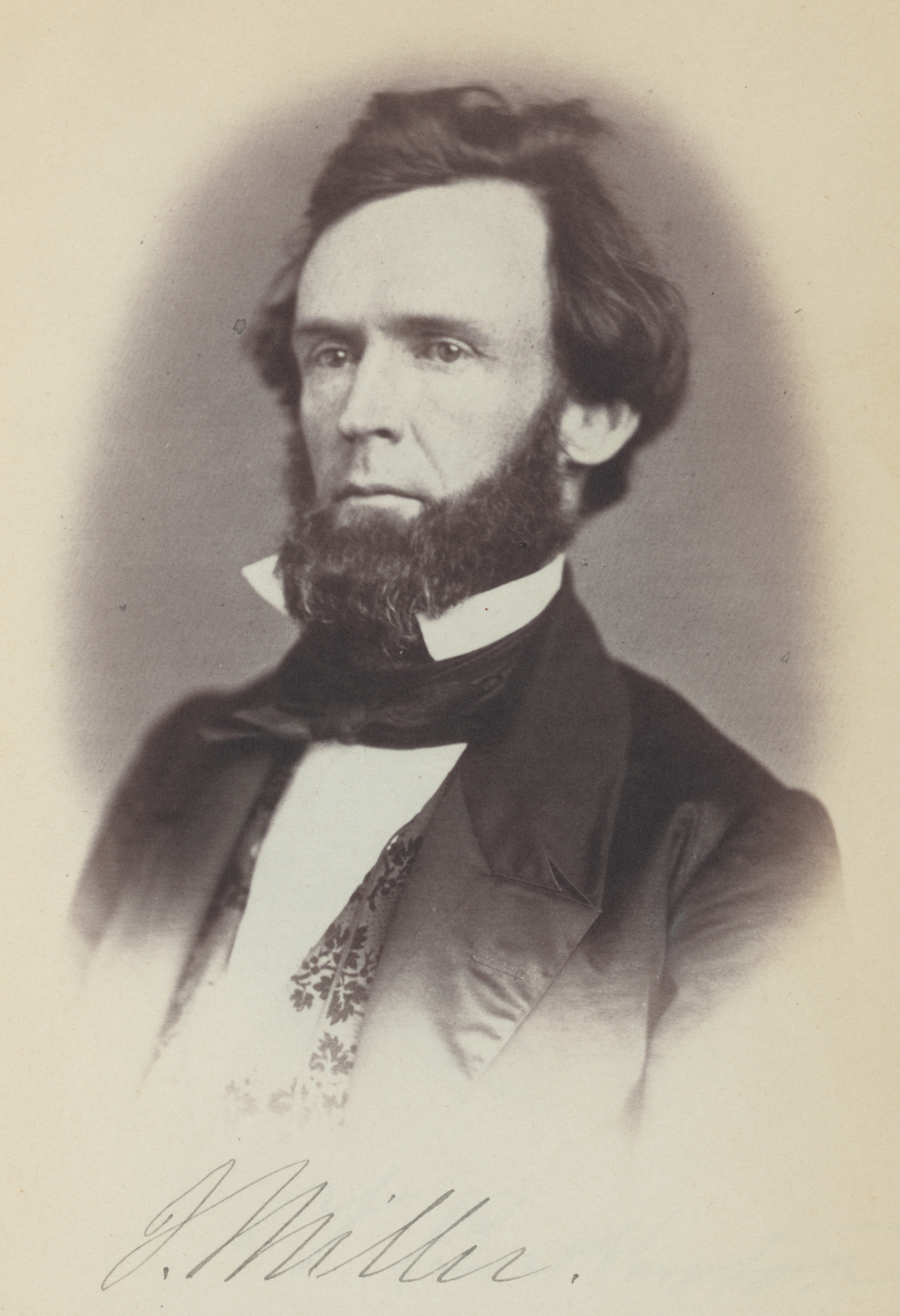
- in 35th Congress

Member of the U.S. House of Representatives from Ohio's 10th district
- In office March 4, 1857 – March 3, 1859
- Preceded by: Oscar F. Moore
- Succeeded by: Carey A. Trimble

Member of the Ohio House of Representatives
- In office 1856

Personal details
- Born: September 9, 1819 Virginia
- Died: May 27, 1862 (aged 42) Cincinnati, Ohio
- Resting place: Grandview Cemetery, Chillicothe
- Party: Democratic
- Education: Miami University

Joseph Miller (September 9, 1819 – May 27, 1862) was an American lawyer, jurist and politician who served as a U.S. representative from Ohio for one term from 1857 to 1859.

== Biography ==
Born in Virginia, Miller attended the common schools. He moved to Ohio and settled in Chillicothe. He was graduated from Miami University, Oxford, Ohio, in 1839. He studied law.

=== Legal career ===
He was admitted to the bar in 1841 and commenced practice in Chillicothe, Ohio.

He served as prosecuting attorney of Ross County, Ohio, from 1844 to 1848.

=== State legislature ===
He served as member of the State house of representatives in 1856.

== Congress ==
Miller was elected as a Democrat to the Thirty-fifth Congress (March 4, 1857 – March 3, 1859). He was an unsuccessful candidate for reelection in 1858 to the Thirty-sixth Congress.

=== Judge ===
He was appointed United States judge for Nebraska Territory March 5, 1859.

== Death ==
He died in Cincinnati, Ohio, on May 27, 1862 at the age of 42. He was interred in Grandview Cemetery, Chillicothe, Ross County, Ohio, USA.

== Sources ==
- United States Congress. "Joseph Miller (id: M000743)". Biographical Directory of the United States Congress.

U.S. House of Representatives
Preceded by Oscar F. Moore	Member of the U.S. House of Representatives from Ohio's 10th congressional district 1857–1859	Succeeded by Carey A. Trimble
