= John L. Taylor =

American politician (1805–1870)

Member of the U.S. House of Representatives from Ohio
- In office March 4, 1847 – March 3, 1855
- Preceded by: Allen G. Thurman
- Succeeded by: Oscar F. Moore
- Constituency: 8th district (1847-1853); 10th district (1853-1855)

Personal details
- Born: John Lampkin Taylor; March 7, 1805 Fredericksburg, Virginia
- Died: September 6, 1870 (aged 65) Washington, D.C.
- Resting place: Louisa, Virginia
- Party: Whig

John Lampkin Taylor (March 7, 1805 – September 6, 1870) was a 19th-century American lawyer who was a U.S. representative from Ohio for four terms from 1847 to 1855.

== Biography ==
Born in Stafford County, near Fredericksburg, Virginia, Taylor completed preparatory studies. He studied law in Washington, D.C..

=== Early career ===
He was admitted to the bar in 1828 and started practice in Chillicothe, Ohio in 1829.

He was a major general in the State militia for several years.

=== Congress ===
Taylor was elected as a Whig to the Thirtieth and to the three succeeding Congresses (March 4, 1847 – March 3, 1855).

=== Later career and death ===
He served as a clerk in the United States Department of the Interior from May 1, 1870, until his sudden death at his desk in Washington, D.C., September 6, 1870. He was interred in the family burying ground on the Mansfield ancestral estate, "Mansfield," near Louisa, Virginia. (His sister Ann Taylor was married to William Day Mansfield.

== Sources ==
- United States Congress. "John L. Taylor (id: T000089)". Biographical Directory of the United States Congress.

U.S. House of Representatives
Preceded by Allen G. Thurman	Member of the U.S. House of Representatives from Ohio's 8th congressional district 1847–1853	Succeeded by Moses B. Corwin
Preceded by Charles Sweetser	Member of the U.S. House of Representatives from Ohio's 10th congressional district 1853–1855	Succeeded by Oscar F. Moore
