= Parliamentarian of the United States House of Representatives =

Official advisor on parliamentary procedure

- Seal of the United States House of Representatives
- Incumbent; Jason Smith since September 2020
- Office of the Parliamentarian
- Type: Parliamentarian
- Appointer: Speaker of the House
- Term length: Serves at the pleasure of the speaker
- Constituting instrument: 2 U.S.C. ch. 9C
- Formation: 1977 (office); 1927 (position)
- First holder: Lewis Deschler
- Deputy: Deputy Parliamentarian

The parliamentarian of the United States House of Representatives manages, supervises, and administers the Office of the Parliamentarian, which is responsible for advising the House's presiding officers, members, and staff on procedural questions under the U.S. Constitution and House rules and precedents, as well as for preparing, compiling, and publishing the precedents of the House.

== Role ==
The parliamentarian is appointed by the speaker of the United States House of Representatives without regard to political affiliation and solely on the basis of fitness to perform the duties of the position. Advice from the parliamentarian's office is confidential upon request.

The parliamentarian, or an assistant parliamentarian, usually sits or stands to the right of the speaker or speaker pro tempore (or the chair of the Committee of the Whole House on the State of the Union, when the House has resolved into that forum) and advises that presiding officer how to respond to such things as parliamentary inquiries, points of order, and the ordinary workings of the procedures of the House.

The legitimacy of parliamentary procedure in the House depends on nonpartisan procedural advice that is transparently consistent. The parliamentarian achieves the requisite consistency by fidelity to precedent, and the requisite transparency by publication. The publications of the Office of the Parliamentarian range from a biennial deskbook to a decennial hornbook to a perennial series of formal precedents. The House Rules and Manual – comprising the Constitution, Jefferson’s Manual, and the rules of the House, each with parliamentary annotations – is the biennial publication that ensures that legislative practitioners have access to the most up-to-date citations of authority on legislative and parliamentary procedure. As such it might be the single most useful tool a legislative practitioner could have.

Probably the most important job of the Office of the Parliamentarian in the long term is the compilation of the precedents. The commitment of the House to the principle of stare decisis in its procedural practice – the idea that fidelity to precedent cultivates levels of consistency and transparency that, in turn, foster fairness in the resolution of questions of order – depends implicitly on the compilation of precedents. Being rigorous about what constitutes actual legal precedent and striving to apply pertinent precedent to each procedural question engenders consistency, and therefore transparency, in procedural practice and, consequently, enhances the perceived legitimacy and fairness, and therefore the integrity, of the proceedings of the House.

== List of parliamentarians ==
The position of parliamentarian was previously known as the "Clerk at the Speaker's table," in which capacity the noted parliamentarian Asher Hinds served as an adviser to the powerful Speakers "Czar" Reed and "Uncle Joe" Cannon, who used precedent and procedure to facilitate their assertive management of House business (both were excoriated by opponents as "czarlike" or "tyrannical").

A parliamentarian has been appointed by the speaker in every Congress since 1927. In the 95th Congress, the House formally established an Office of the Parliamentarian to be managed by a nonpartisan parliamentarian appointed by the speaker (2 U.S.C. § 287). The compilation and distribution of the precedents of the House are authorized by law (2 U.S.C. § 28, et seq.). The current parliamentarian is Jason A. Smith.

The following have served as House parliamentarian:

Order	Name	Title	Term	Congress(es)
1	Thaddeus Morrice	Messenger to the Speaker	1855–1865	34th–38th
2	William D. Todd	Messenger to the Speaker	1863–1869	38th–40th
3	John M. Barclay	Clerk at the Speaker's Table	1869–1875	41st–43rd
4	William H. Scudder	Clerk at the Speaker's Table	1875–1877	44th, 45th
5	J. Randolph Tucker Jr.	Clerk at the Speaker's Table	1877–1879	45th
6	George P. Miller	Clerk at the Speaker's Table	1879–1880	46th
7	Michael Sullivan	Clerk at the Speaker's Table	1879–1881	46th
(5)	J. Randolph Tucker Jr.	Clerk at the Speaker's Table	1879–1881	46th
(7)	Michael Sullivan	Clerk at the Speaker's Table	1881–1883	47th
8	J. Guilford White	Clerk at the Speaker's Table	1881–1883	47th
9	Nathaniel T. Crutchfield	Clerk at the Speaker's Table	1883–1891	48th–51st
10	Forrest Goodwin	Clerk at the Speaker's Table	1889–1891	51st
11	Charles Robert Crisp	Clerk at the Speaker's Table	1891–1895	52nd, 53rd
12	Asher Crosby Hinds	Clerk at the Speaker's Table	1895–1911	54th–61st
(11)	Charles Robert Crisp	Clerk at the Speaker's Table	1911–1913	62nd
13	Joel Bennett Clark	Clerk at the Speaker's Table	1913–1917	63rd, 64th
14	Clarence Andrew Cannon	Clerk at the Speaker's Table	1917–1919	65th
(13)	Joel Bennett Clark	Clerk at the Speaker's Table	1917–1919	65th
15	Lehr Fess	Clerk at the Speaker's Table Parliamentarian (70th Congress)	1919–1927	66th–70th
16	Lewis Deschler	Parliamentarian	1927–1974	70th–93rd
17	William Holmes Brown	Parliamentarian	1974–1994	93rd–103rd
18	Charles W. Johnson	Parliamentarian	1994–2004	104th–108th
19	John V. Sullivan	Parliamentarian	2004–2012	108th–112th
20	Thomas J. Wickham Jr.	Parliamentarian	2012–2020	112th–116th
21	Jason Smith	Parliamentarian	2020–present	116th–119th

== See also ==
- Parliamentarian of the United States Senate
