= William Holmes Brown =

American government official (1929–2001)

2nd Parliamentarian of the United States House of Representatives
- In office 1974–1994
- Preceded by: Lewis Deschler
- Succeeded by: Charles W. Johnson

Personal details
- Born: September 3, 1929
- Died: May 27, 2001 (aged 71)
- Education: University of Chicago Law School

William Holmes Brown (3 September 1929 – 27 May 2001) was the Parliamentarian of the United States House of Representatives from 1974 to 1994.
