= Ohio University – Chillicothe =

Ohio University Regional Campus

Ohio University Chillicothe
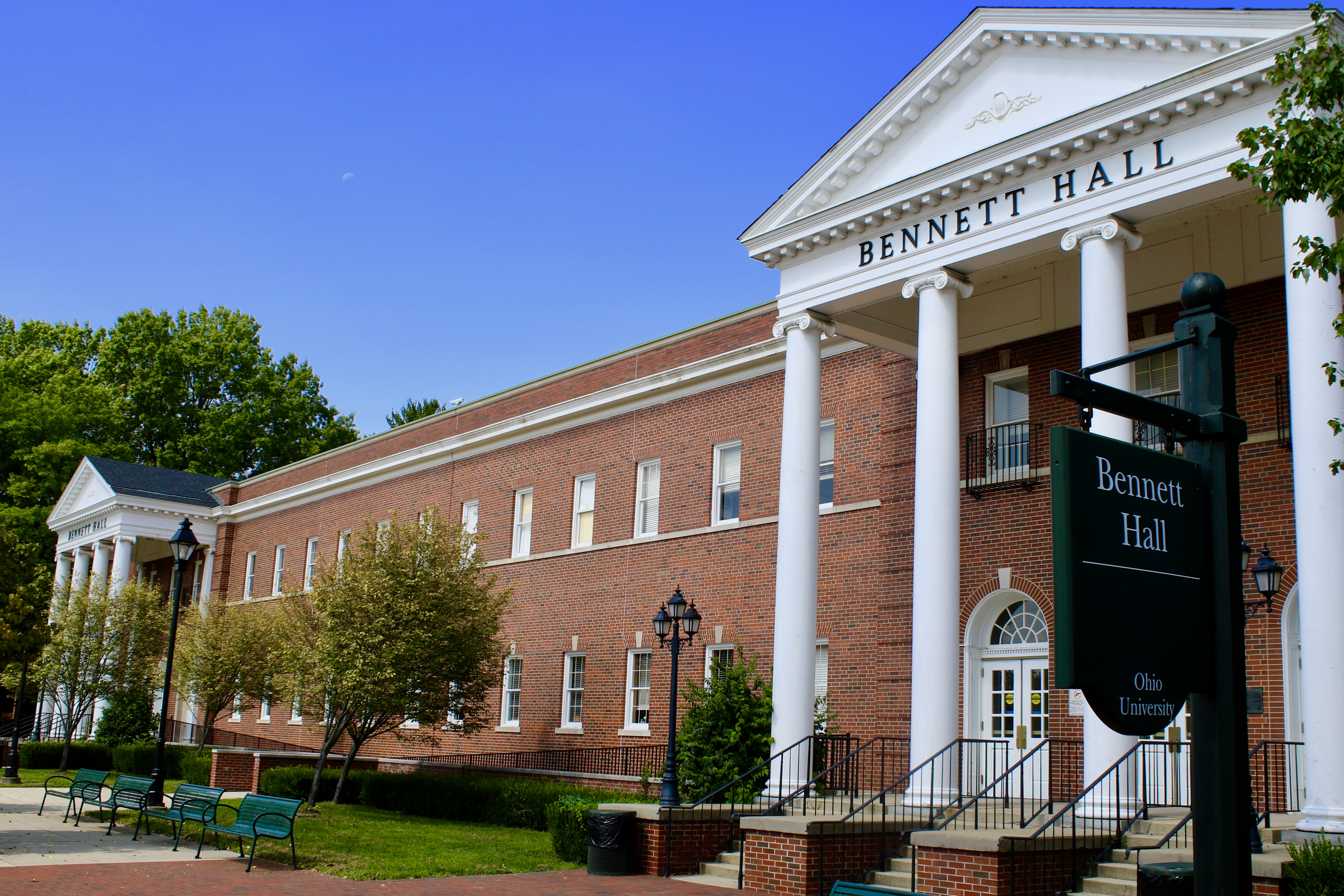
- Type: Public regional campus
- Established: February 18, 1946; 80 years ago
- Parent institution: Ohio University
- President: Dr. Lori Gonzalez
- Dean: Michael Lafreniere
- Students: 2,016
- Location: Chillicothe, Ohio, United States; 39°19′42″N 83°0′16″W
- Campus: Rural
- Colors: Cutler green and Cupola white
- Mascot: Bobcats
- Website: www.ohio.edu/chillicothe

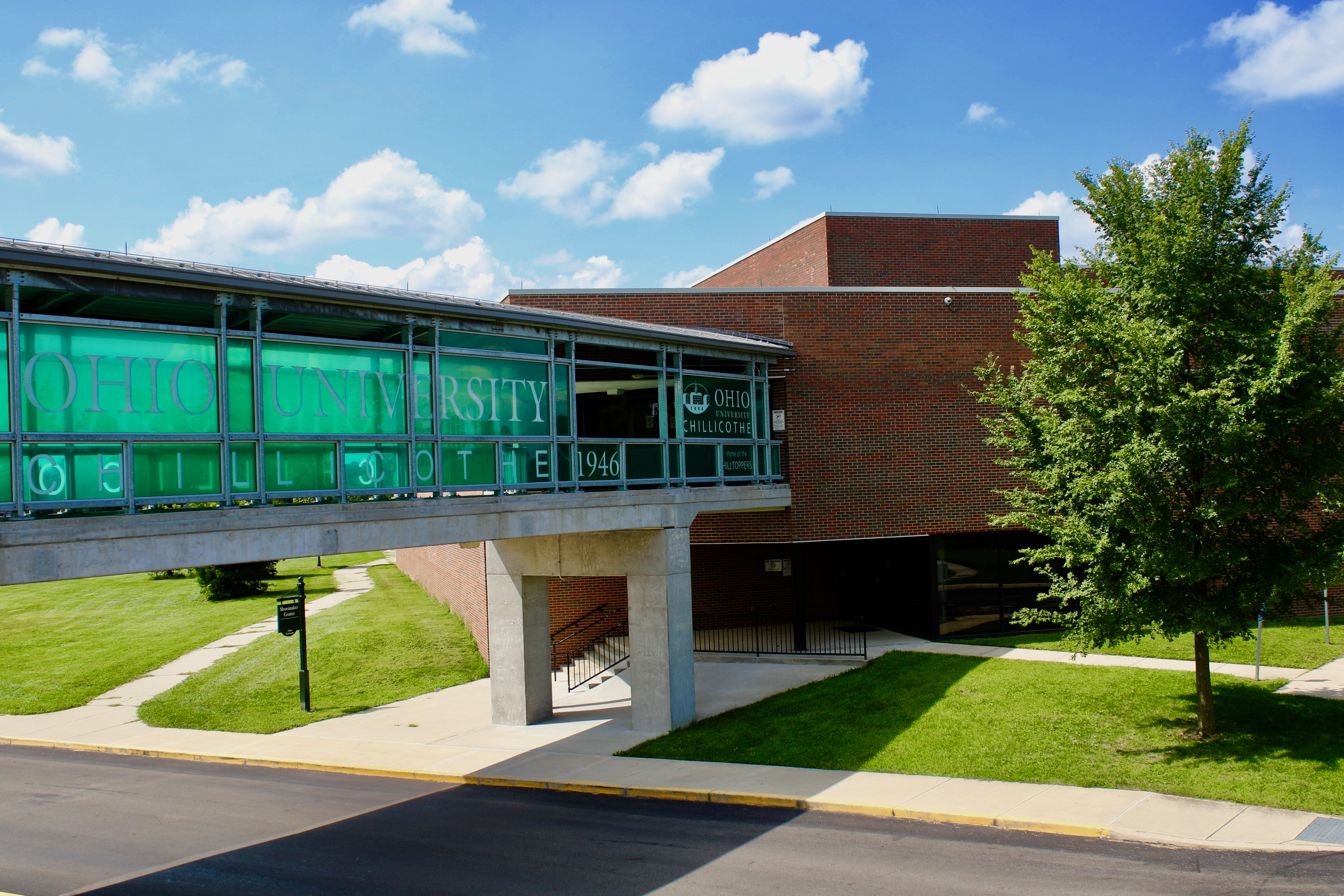
Shoemaker Center

Ohio University Chillicothe is a regional campus of Ohio University in Chillicothe, Ohio. Founded in 1946, Ohio University Chillicothe is the first of Ohio University's regional campuses and the first regional campus in the state. It is located 45 miles (72 km) south of the state capital of Columbus. As of 2024, it has an enrollment of approximately 2,000 students.

== History ==
The oldest of the five regional campuses of Ohio University and the first regional campus in the state, Ohio University Chillicothe opened as a regional campus in September 1946 to help eliminate post–World War II overcrowding on the university's main campus. The school began with 281 students, 70 percent of whom were armed services veterans. Beginning with night courses at Chillicothe High School, Ohio Chillicothe started daytime classes in September 1960 at Chillicothe's First Presbyterian Church. The school moved to its current location on University Hill on the western side of the city in September 1966 with the completion of Bennett Hall.

== Campus ==
Ohio University Chillicothe has five main buildings. Bennett Hall serves as the hub of campus activity, with classrooms, administrative offices and an auditorium. Stevenson Center is home to the campus library, Quinn Library, and learning commons. Shoemaker Center is the health and wellness facility on campus. The Child Development and Family Service Center opened in 2006 and houses Ross County Community Action-Head Start. It is also an active laboratory for early childhood education majors. The Technology and Business Development Center opened in 2012 and is home to business, law enforcement technology, and science courses, as well as workshops and seminars.

== Academics ==
Ohio University Chillicothe offers twelve associate degree and fourteen bachelor's degree programs. There are over thirty full-time faculty members and more than seventy adjunct faculty. Ohio University Chillicothe also offers the College Credit Plus program, which allows secondary students to earn college credit and satisfy high school graduation requirements at the same time by taking college-level courses. Noncredit courses and workshops are also offered on the Chillicothe campus.

Ohio University Chillicothe students may relocate to the main campus in Athens to continue their degree studies.

Ohio University Chillicothe enrolls a mix of both traditional college students (young adults ages 18–22 who begin college directly out of high school) and adults who are pursuing a degree later in life, often after many years of work experience. In addition, the campus offers a wide variety of course times and schedules to allow students to take classes at their convenience. The campus practices open admissions.

== Alumni ==
- Donald Ray Pollock, author
