= Joseph Scott Fullerton =

American lawyer

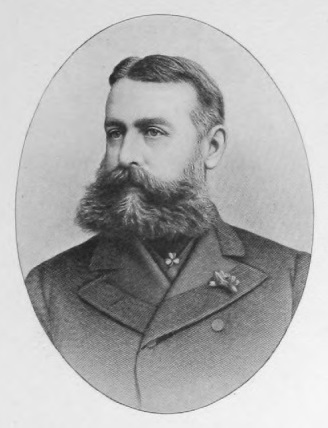
- Born: December 3, 1835; Chillicothe, Ohio, U.S.
- Died: March 20, 1897 (aged 61); Oakland, Maryland, U.S.
- Occupations: Lawyer; Officer in the Union Army

Signature
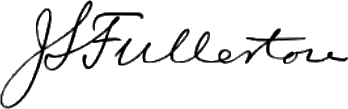

Joseph Scott Fullerton (December 3, 1835 – March 20, 1897) was an American lawyer, officer in the Union Army during the American Civil War, and a leader for a short time at the Freedmen's Bureau during the Reconstruction Era. In his later years he was a National military park manager and real estate developer.

== Life and career ==
Fullerton was born in December 1835 in Chillicothe, Ohio, to Elizabeth Thompson née Scott and Humphrey Fullerton Jr. The Fullerton family had been patriots in the American Revolution and had large landholdings in Pennsylvania near Lancaster. He was educated at Chillicothe Academy and then enrolled in Miami University where he graduated in 1856. He graduated from Cincinnati Law School in 1858 and for a while worked in the office of a Chillicothe attorney before settling in St. Louis, Missouri where he continued to practice law.

During the Civil War he was given the rank of brevet brigadier general after refusing an appointment as major citing his lack of experience, enlisting as a private, and quickly receiving an appointment as a 1st lieutenant. He was part of the 2nd Missouri Infantry. He rose to be assistant adjutant general with the rank of major on the staff of General Gordon Granger and was also lieutenant colonel, A.A.G. and chief of staff of the 4th Army Corps, Army of the Cumberland. Fullerton was brevetted brigadier general March 13, 1865, for his service during the Atlanta Campaign.

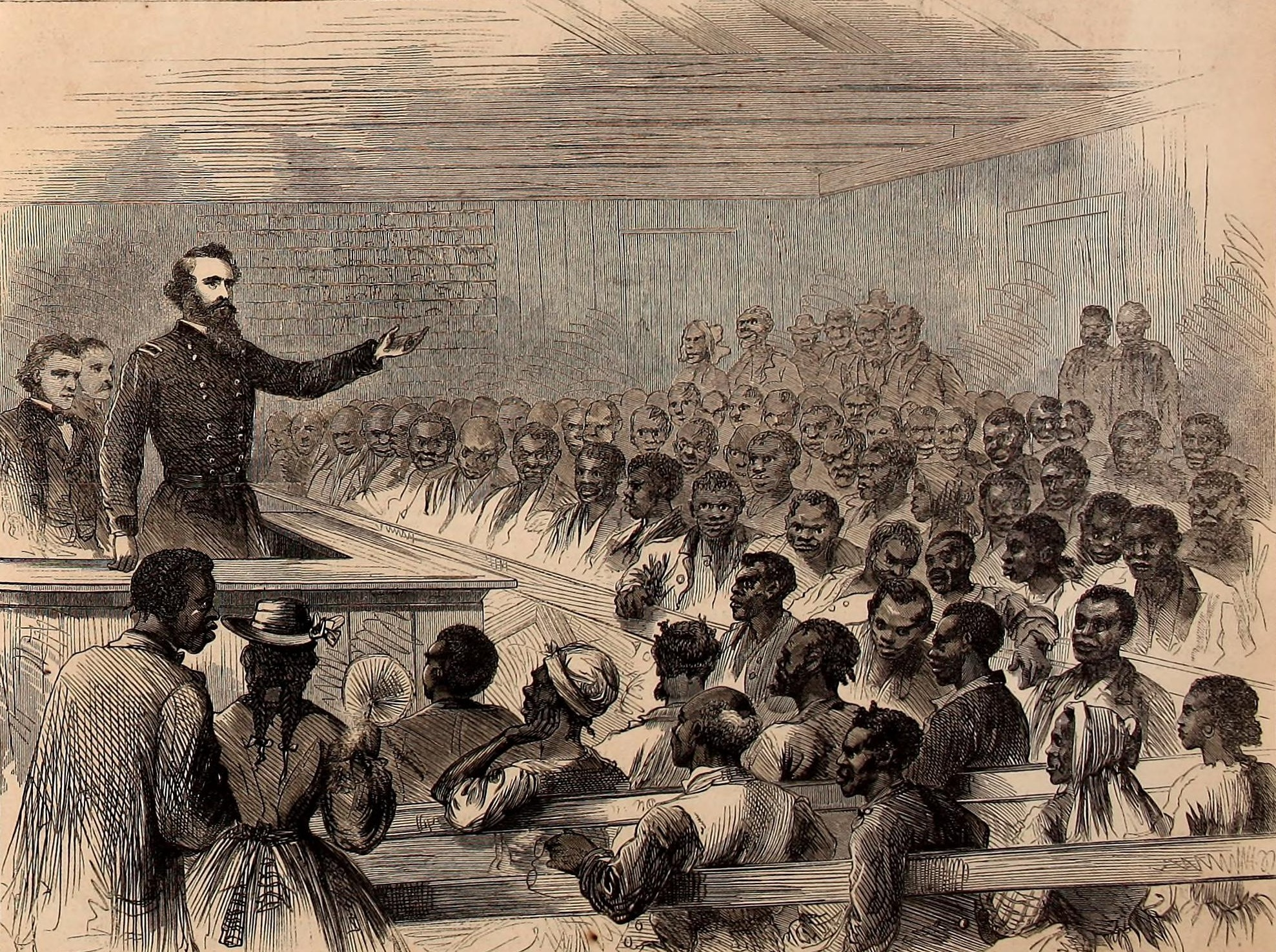
Fullerton addressing freedmen in their church at the Trent River settlement outside of New Bern, North Carolina as part of a regional inspection of Freedmen's Bureau operations in 1866.

Fullerton helped organize and lead the Freedmen Bureau but he did not stay in that role for long. President Andrew Johnson sent him to help settle strife in New Orleans between free Blacks, "colored" veterans, and white supremacists after riots in 1866.

On his return to St. Louis in 1867, Fullerton became the postmaster general of the city. He acquired large tracts of land in suburban St. Louis and as a real estate developer was the driving force behind the housing developments in Westminster Place and Portland and Westmoreland Places. In the 1890s he was also Chairman of the Chickamauga & Chattanooga National Military Park.

Fullerton died in a railroad accident on March 20, 1897, near Oakland, Maryland. The train on which he was riding jumped the tracks while crossing a bridge over the Youghiogheny River. His carriage fell into the river and broke in two. His body was carried downstream and was not found for three weeks. He was the only fatality in the accident. Fullerton was buried at Grandview Cemetery in Chillicothe in a funeral attended by many dignitaries from Washington, including General Stanley under whom he had served in the Civil War.
