= William Maxwell (engraver) =

American politician

- Born: c. 1766
- Died: September 10, 1809; Greene County, OH
- Other name: Colonel Maxwell
- Occupations: Engraver and Publisher, Judge, Sheriff
- Known for: Publisher of Centinel of the Northwest Territory

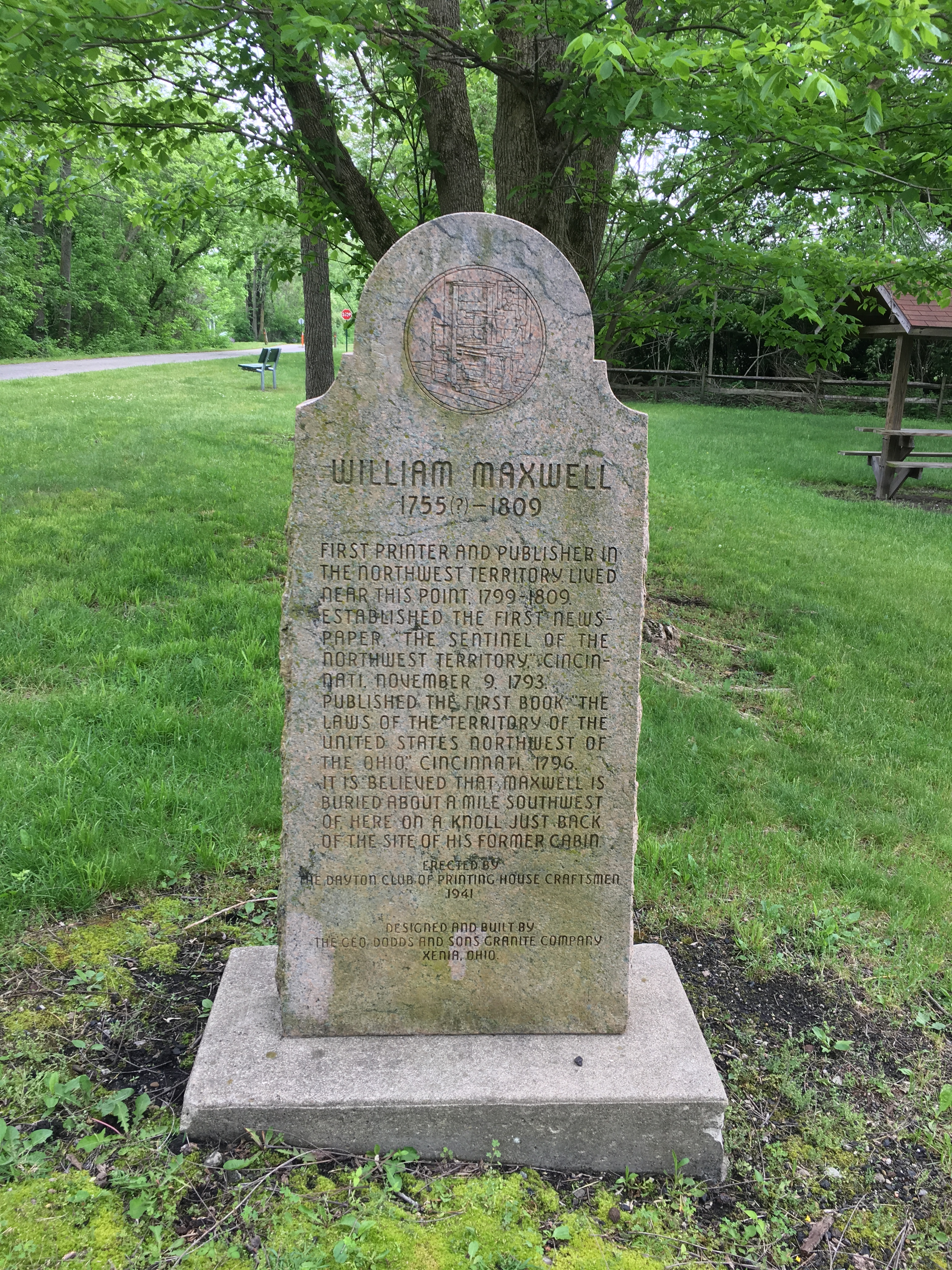
William Maxwell Memorial at the William Maxwell Rest Area on the Little Miami Scenic Trail, May 2018

William Maxwell (c. 1766 – September 10, 1809) was the first engraver to publish a newspaper in Cincinnati, Ohio. The paper was called the Centinel of the Northwest Territory, and the first issue was published on Saturday, November 9, 1793. The motto of the paper was "Open to all parties–but influenced by none". He used a portable wood printing press, which he took with him to Lexington, Kentucky and set up a business. In 1793 he left for Cincinnati and began his weekly newspaper, which consisted of four pages and had a limited circulation. The printing press he used was much like the one invented by Johann Gutenberg. In 1796 he printed Laws of the Territory of the United States Northwest of the Ohio in Cincinnati, a two-hundred and twenty-five page book with one-thousand issues printed. Subsequently known as "Maxwell's Code", this was the first book printed in the Northwest Territory.

Maxwell represented Hamilton County, Ohio at the first meeting of the Ohio General Assembly in Chillicothe in 1803, and there he was instrumental in the creation of Greene County, Ohio. He was briefly a judge before serving as sheriff of Greene County from 1803 until 1807. He also became active in the local militia, and was known as "Colonel Maxwell" by the time of his death.
