= Chillicothe, Ohio =

- City
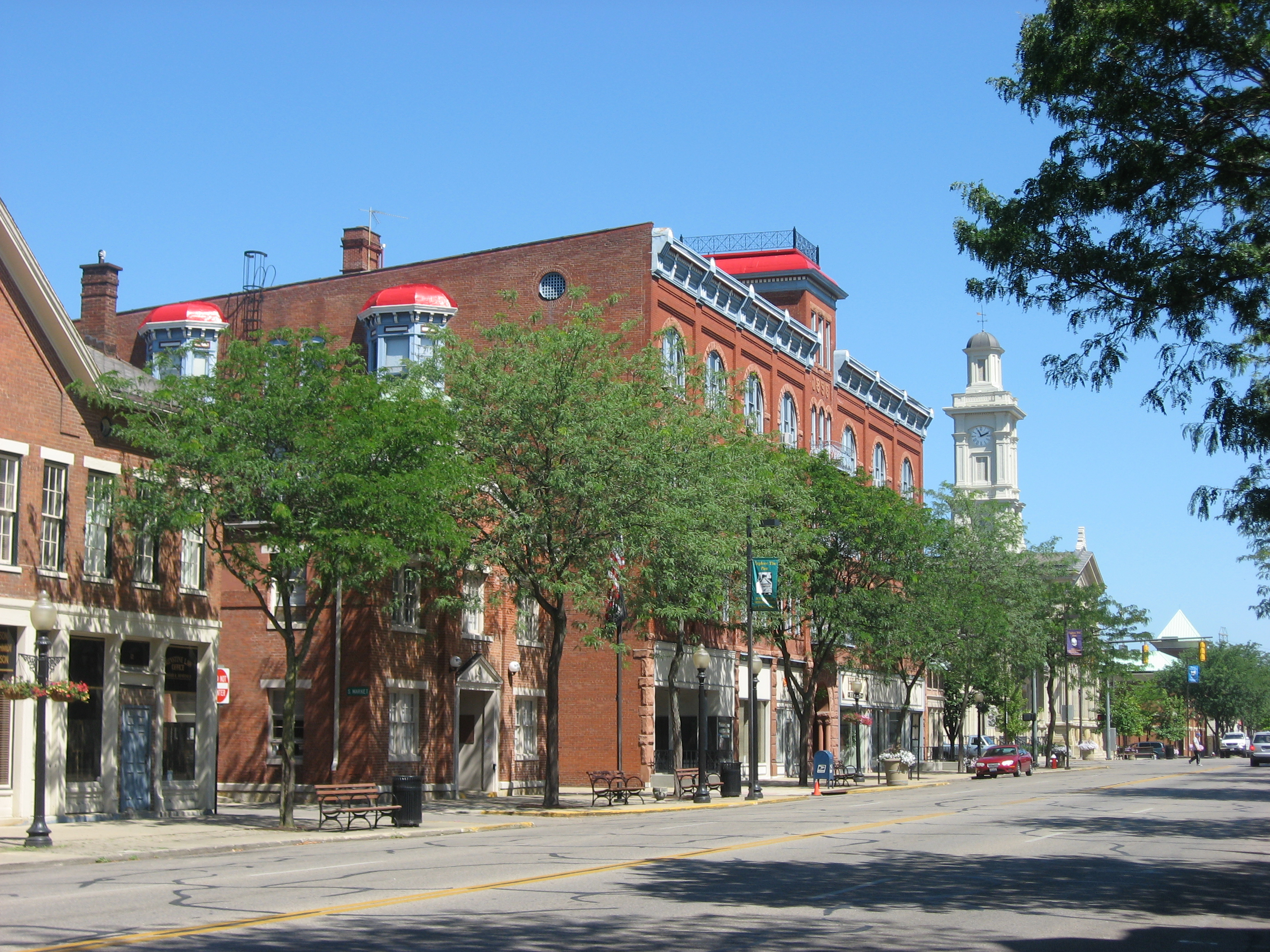
- Central business district

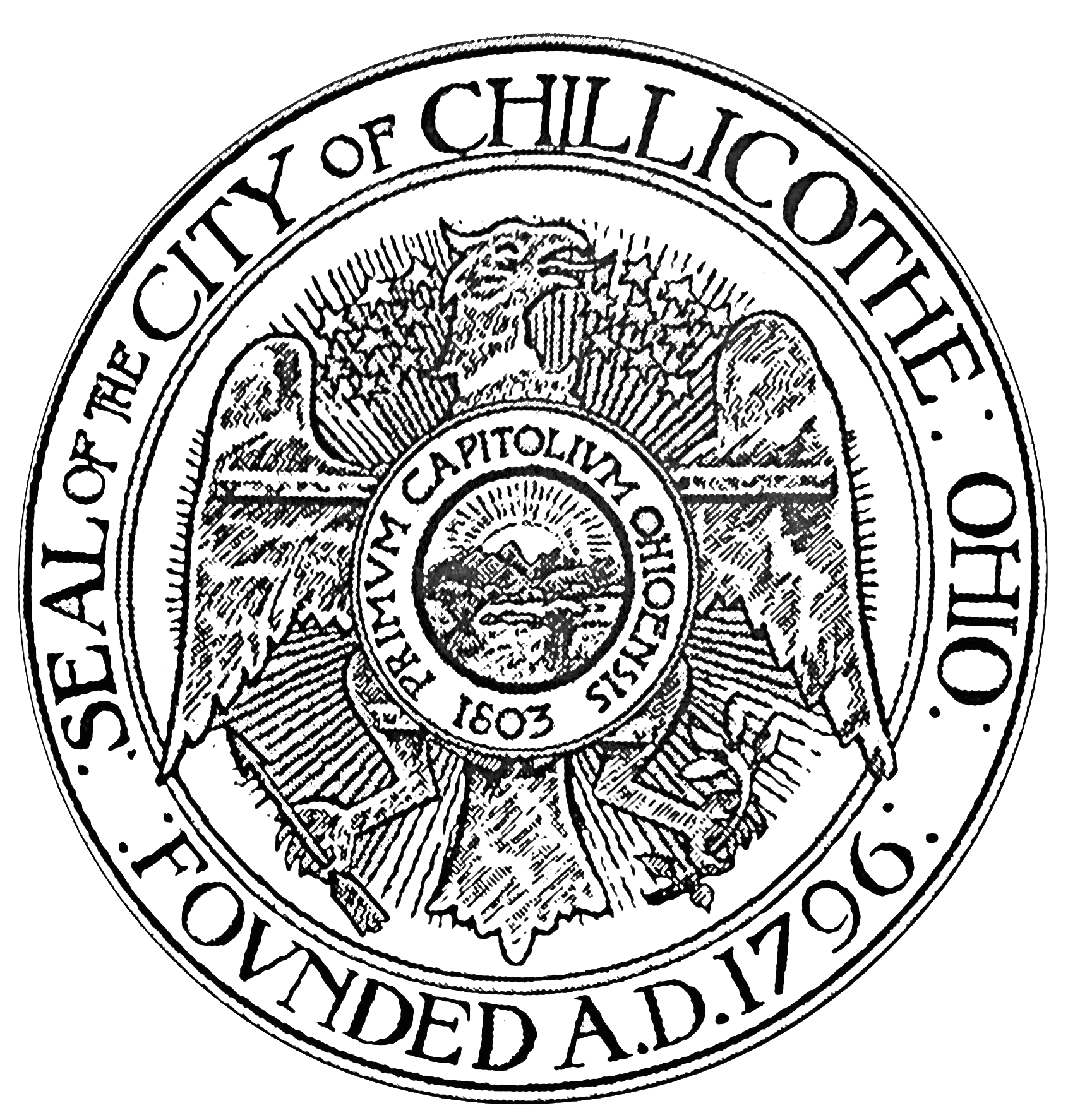
- Flag Seal
- Nickname: Ohio's First Capital
- Interactive map of Chillicothe, Ohio
- Location within Ohio Location within the United States
- Coordinates: 39°20′22″N 82°59′42″W
- Country: United States
- State: Ohio
- County: Ross
- Founded: 1796
- Named for: Chalahgawtha

Government
  - Mayor: Luke Feeney (D)

Area
  - Total: 10.66 sq mi (27.62 km^{2})
  - Land: 10.50 sq mi (27.19 km^{2})
  - Water: 0.17 sq mi (0.43 km^{2})
- Elevation: 637 ft (194 m)

Population (2020)
  - Total: 22,059
  - Estimate (2023): 21,895
  - Density: 2,100.9/sq mi (811.17/km^{2})
- Time zone: UTC-5 (EST)
  - Summer (DST): UTC-4 (EDT)
- ZIP code: 45601
- Area codes: 740, 220
- FIPS code: 39-14184
- GNIS feature ID: 2393514
- Website: https://www.chillicotheoh.gov/

Chillicothe (/ˌtʃɪlɪˈkɒθi/ CHIL-ih-KOTH-ee) is a city in Ross County, Ohio, United States, and its county seat. The population was 22,059 at the 2020 census. The town's population peaked around 25,000 in 1960 and has held steady in the intervening decades.

Located along the Scioto River 45 miles (72 km) south of Columbus, Chillicothe was the first and third capital of Ohio. It is the only city in Ross County and the center of the Chillicothe micropolitan area, which is a part of the Columbus, Ohio Combined Statistical Area. Chillicothe is a designated Tree City USA by the National Arbor Day Foundation.

Chillicothe is the birthplace of Tecumseh, the Shawnee leader during the War of 1812. The town was an important waypoint during the American Revolutionary War and American Civil War eras. Indigenous tribes, white settlers, and freed slaves all traversed the area. A number of well-known Ohio politicians, sports stars, and professionals have been native to Chillicothe. The town has a 19th century theater and opera house and hosts a number of summer fairs. Beginning in 1973, a drama, Tecumseh!, has been staged annually in Chillicothe.

== History ==
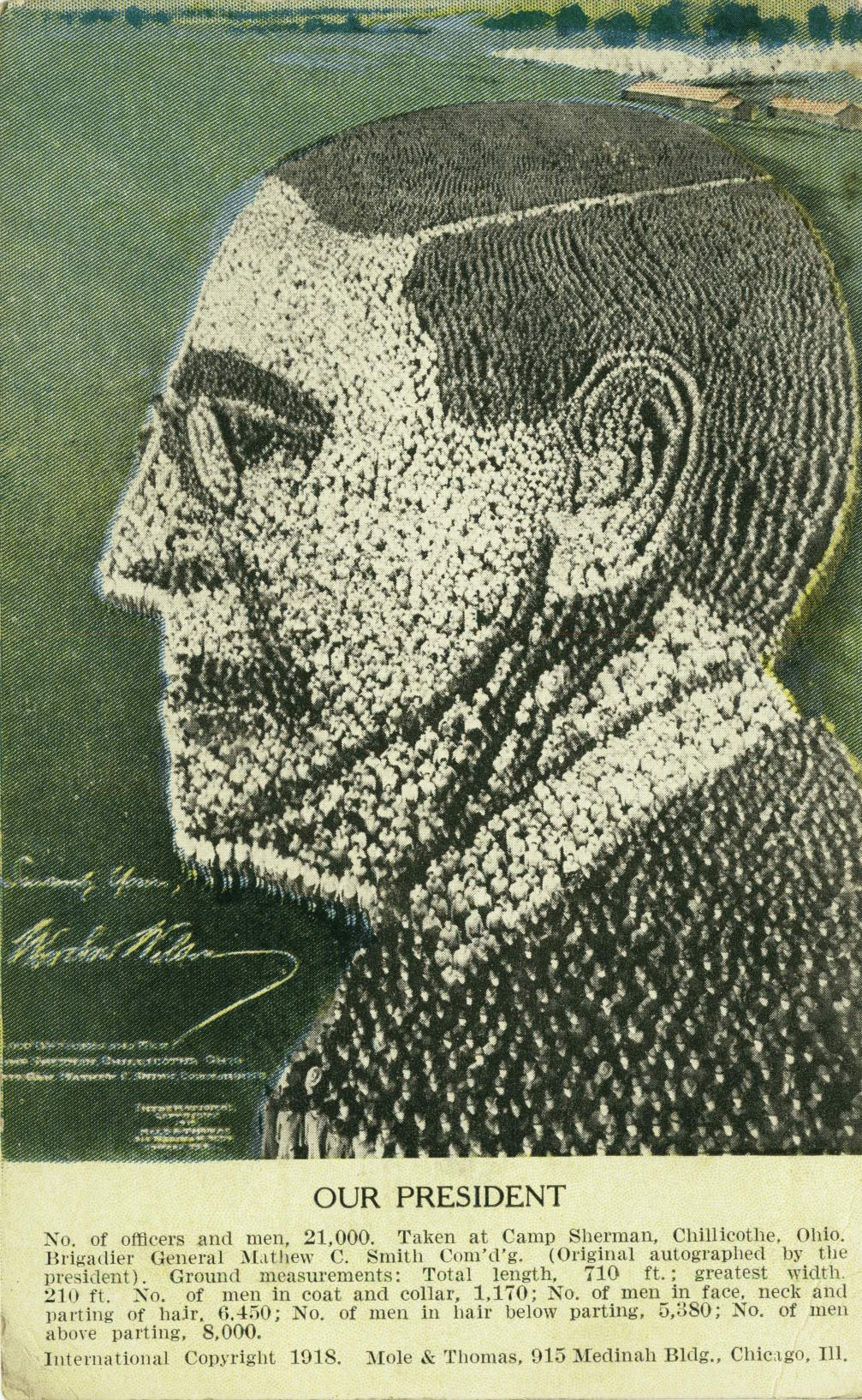
Image of President Woodrow Wilson created by 21,000 standing soldiers at Camp Sherman in Chillicothe, 1918

The region around Chillicothe was the center of the ancient Hopewell tradition, which flourished from 200 BC until 500 AD. This Amerindian culture had trade routes extending to the Rocky Mountains. They built earthen mounds for ceremonial and burial purposes throughout the Scioto and Ohio River valleys.

Later Native Americans who inhabited the area through the time of European contact included Shawnees. Present-day Chillicothe is the most recent of seven locations in Ohio that bore the name, because it was applied to the main town wherever the Chalakatha settled. Other population centers named Chillicothe in Ohio at one time include: one located at present-day Piqua, in Miami County; one located south of present-day Circleville, Pickaway County, on the Scioto River; a third about three miles (4.8 km) north of Xenia in Greene County, Ohio; a fourth at present-day Frankfort, Ross County, on Paint Creek; and a fifth also located in Ross County, at Hopetown, three miles north of modern Chillicothe.

In 1758 a settlement was established at this site by Shawnee Indians who had abandoned their village of Lower Shawneetown in November of that year. A group of Shawnees from Logstown also joined them.

After the Treaty of Greenville in 1795 forced the Native Americans from most of Ohio, European settlers came to the area. Migrants from Virginia and Kentucky moved west along the Ohio River in search of land. The community Chillicothe was founded in 1796 by a party led by General Nathaniel Massie on his land grant. The town's name comes from the Shawnee Chala·ka·tha (Chillicothe in English), meaning "principal town", because it was the chief settlement of that division (one of five major divisions) of the Shawnee people.

In 1798, Ross County became incorporated with Chillicothe as the county seat. Chillicothe was named the capital of the remnant Northwest Territory in 1800, when Indiana Territory was split off, and the Northwest Territory was reduced to Ohio, eastern Michigan and a sliver of southeastern Indiana. In 1802 as Ohio moved toward statehood, the city hosted the Ohio Constitutional Convention. It served as the capital of Ohio from statehood in 1803 until 1810 then again from 1812 to 1816.

Ohio was a free state, and early migrants to Chillicothe included free blacks, who came to a place with fewer restrictions than in the slave states. They created a vibrant community and aided runaway slaves coming north. As tensions increased prior to the breakout of the American Civil War, the free black community at Chillicothe maintained stations and aid to support refugees on the Underground Railroad. The Ohio River was a border with the slave states of the South, with slaves crossing the river to freedom, and then up the Scioto River to get more distance from their former homes and slave hunters. White abolitionists aided the Underground Railroad as well.

On May 12, 1948, a C. & O. engine suffered a boiler explosion due to a low water level near Chillicothe, Ohio. The train's engineer, fireman and front brakeman were killed.

== Geography ==
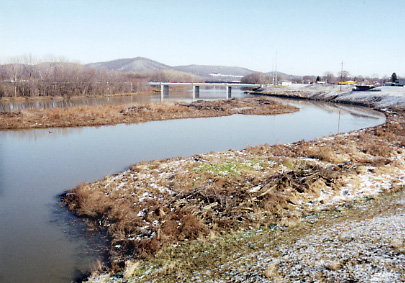
Scioto River at Chillicothe

Chillicothe lies within the ecoregion of the Western Allegheny Plateau. It lies between the Scioto River and Paint Creek near their confluence.

According to the United States Census Bureau, the city has a total area of 10.60 square miles (27.45 km^{2}), of which 10.43 square miles (27.01 km^{2}) is land and 0.17 square miles (0.44 km^{2}) is water.

The city is surrounded by farming communities, and Chillicothe residents describe the area as the foothills of the Appalachians. Chilicothe has a humid subtropical environment, right on the border with humid continental.

== Demographics ==
Historical population
Census	Pop.	Note	%±
1820	2,426		—
1830	2,846		17.3%
1840	3,977		39.7%
1850	7,100		78.5%
1860	7,626		7.4%
1870	8,920		17.0%
1880	10,938		22.6%
1890	11,288		3.2%
1900	12,976		15.0%
1910	14,508		11.8%
1920	15,831		9.1%
1930	18,340		15.8%
1940	20,129		9.8%
1950	20,133		0.0%
1960	24,957		24.0%
1970	24,842		−0.5%
1980	23,420		−5.7%
1990	21,923		−6.4%
2000	21,796		−0.6%
2010	21,901		0.5%
2020	22,059		0.7%
2025 (est.)	21,815		−1.1%

=== 2020 census ===
As of the 2020 census, Chillicothe had a population of 22,059 and a median age of 42.3 years; 21.0% of residents were under the age of 18, 21.1% were 65 years of age or older, and for every 100 females there were 92.0 males (88.4 males for every 100 females age 18 and over). 100.0% of residents lived in urban areas, while 0% lived in rural areas.

There were 9,576 households, including 5,589 families. Of those households, 24.9% had children under the age of 18 living in them, 35.6% were married-couple households, 21.1% had a male householder with no spouse or partner present, 33.9% had a female householder with no spouse or partner present, 36.1% were made up of individuals, and 16.6% had someone living alone who was 65 years of age or older. The average family size was 2.95.

There were 10,507 housing units, of which 8.9% were vacant. Among occupied housing units, 57.4% were owner-occupied and 42.6% were renter-occupied, with a homeowner vacancy rate of 1.9% and a rental vacancy rate of 8.4%.

Racial composition as of the 2020 census
Race	Number	Percent
White	18,892	85.6%
Black or African American	1,348	6.1%
American Indian and Alaska Native	88	0.4%
Asian	155	0.7%
Native Hawaiian and Other Pacific Islander	6	<0.1%
Some other race	151	0.7%
Two or more races	1,419	6.4%
Hispanic or Latino (of any race)	351	1.6%

=== 2010 census ===
As of the census of 2010, there were 21,901 people, 9,420 households, and 5,559 families residing in the city. The population density was 2,099.8 inhabitants per square mile (810.7/km^{2}). There were 10,600 housing units at an average density of 1,016.3 per square mile (392.4/km^{2}). The racial makeup of the city was 88.1% White, 7.2% African American, 0.3% Native American, 0.5% Asian, 0.5% from other races, and 3.4% from two or more races. Hispanic or Latino of any race were 1.3% of the population.

There were 9,420 households, of which 27.5% had children under the age of 18 living with them, 39.1% were married couples living together, 14.9% had a female householder with no spouse present, 5.0% had a male householder with no spouse present, and 41.0% were non-families. 34.6% of all households were made up of individuals, and 14.3% had someone living alone who was 65 years of age or older. The average household size was 2.25 and the average family size was 2.87.

The median age in the city was 41.5 years. 21.8% of residents were under the age of 18; 7.7% were between the ages of 18 and 24; 24.8% were from 25 to 44; 27.8% were from 45 to 64; and 17.9% were 65 years of age or older. The gender makeup of the city was 47.6% male and 52.4% female.

== Economy ==
As the only city in its area, Chillicothe is a hub for economic activity. Hospitals (Adena Regional and Chillicothe VA Medical Centers), prisons (Ross and Chillicothe Correctional Institutions) and a college campus (Ohio University Chillicothe) are among the largest employers. Kenworth, a manufacturer of medium-duty and heavy-duty trucks and a division of PACCAR, has its largest manufacturing plant in Chillicothe. In April 2025, the Pixelle paper mill, formerly named for past owners Glatfelter and Mead Paper, and employing about 800 people, announced its closure.

== Arts and culture ==
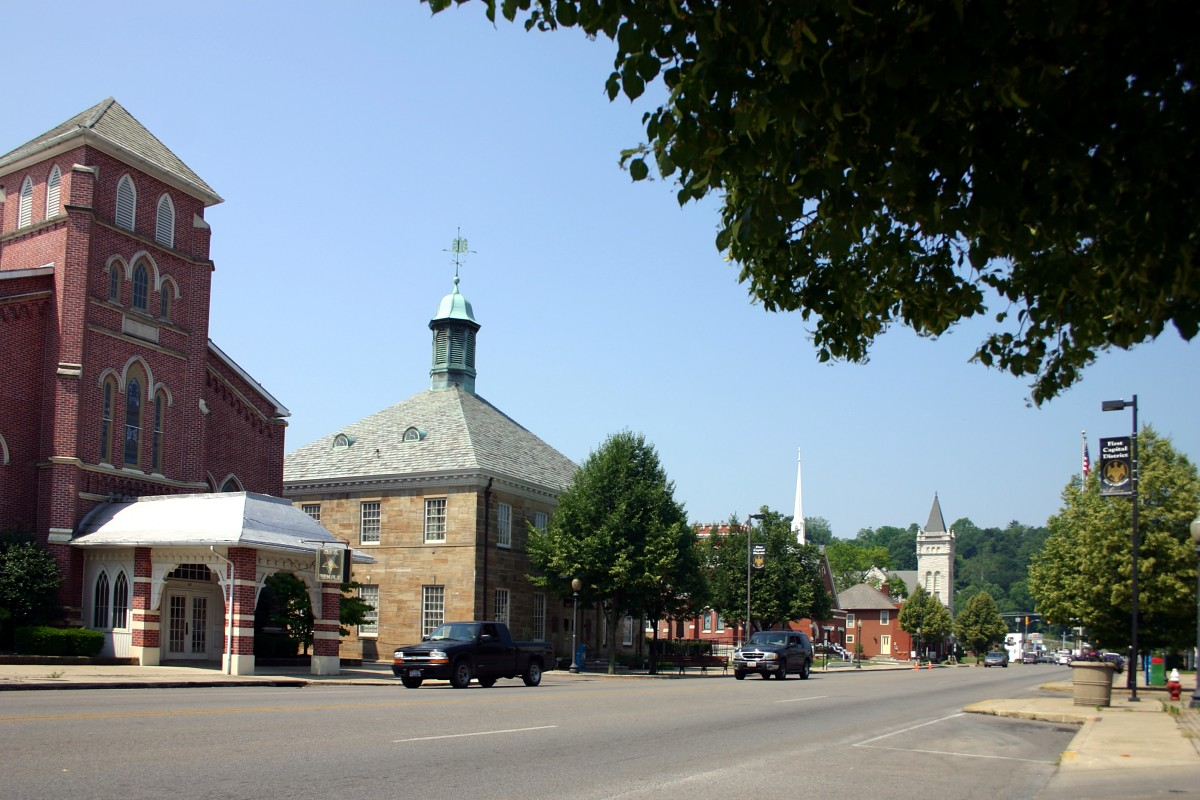
The south side of West Main Street. The square building left of center is a replica of Ohio's first capitol building and serves as the office of the Chillicothe Gazette.

=== Majestic Theatre ===
Chillicothe is home to the 158-year-old continuously operating Majestic Theatre. Its stage has been graced by such greats as Laurel and Hardy, Milton Berle, George Arliss, Sophie Tucker, Bob Hope and many others. In 1853 the Masonic Hall was built, as the first incarnation of what is now the Majestic Theatre. The two-story brick building was a combination lodge room, dance hall, and theater. Stock companies stayed for as long as a month, performing a repertory of plays. In 1876 the Masons appointed a building committee to enlarge their building. The original building was 40 ft × 100 ft (12 m × 30 m) and was later extended to 50 ft × 120 ft (15 m × 37 m). Upon completion in December 1876 it was announced that the Masonic Opera House was one of the finest theaters in the state. After the remodeling and with the completion of the Clough Opera House across the city, theater offerings were tremendous, and varied drama, comedy, farce, minstrel shows, and operas were presented.

In 1904, A. R. Wolf bought the Masonic Opera House. Mr. Wolf remodeled the theater and enlarged the stage. He replaced all the windows in the front of the building with stained glass. The Masonic Opera House continued under Wolf's managerial abilities until he sold it to the Myers Brothers in 1914. They again made some improvements and repairs and installed a movie screen and equipment. The Myers Brothers changed the name to the Majestic Theatre. They occasionally had live theater productions on the stage but finally switched exclusively to motion pictures. In July 1971, Harley and Evelyn Bennett became the new owners of the Majestic Theatre. They did careful restoration with reference to the original wall painting. Three Chillicothe businessmen (Robert Evans, Robert Althoff and David Uhrig) bought the theater as a non-profit organization in 1990. All new wiring throughout the theater, fire safety, and security systems were installed.

=== Fairs and festivals ===
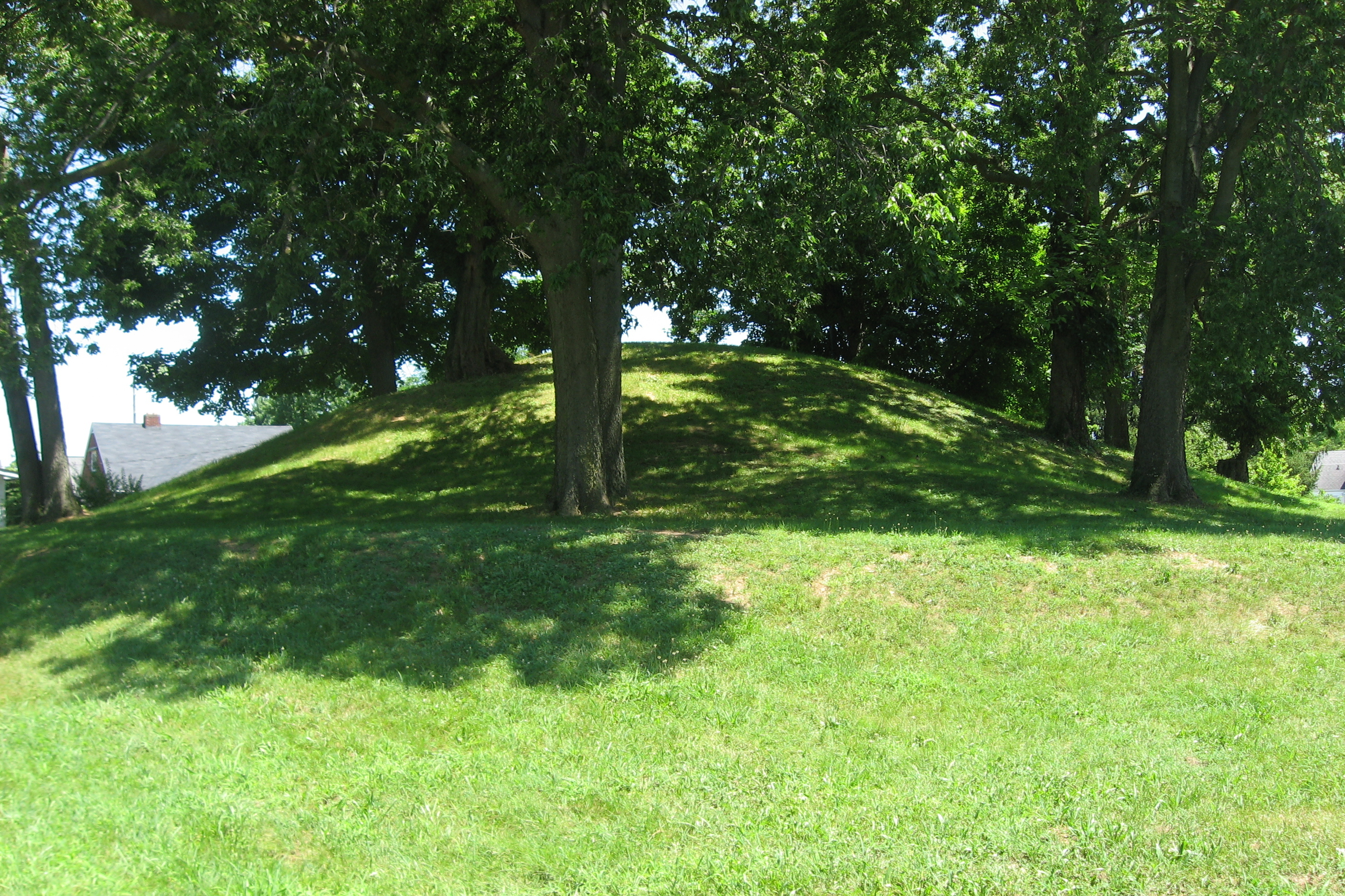
Chillicothe's Story Mound State Memorial

Chillicothe, rich in Native American history, hosts the annual Feast of the Flowering Moon Festival. Started in 1984, the May festival draws crowds of approximately 85,000. Yoctangee Park, in the historic downtown, is the setting for this family-oriented, three-day event featuring Native American music, dancing, traders and exhibits, a mountain men encampment, rendezvous with working craftsmen and demonstrations, and an extensive arts and crafts show with more than 80 crafters and commercial exhibits. The main stage has a schedule of family-friendly entertainment, such as local school bands and performers. The streets are lined with food booths and games/contests. Events are free to the public.

== Parks and recreation ==
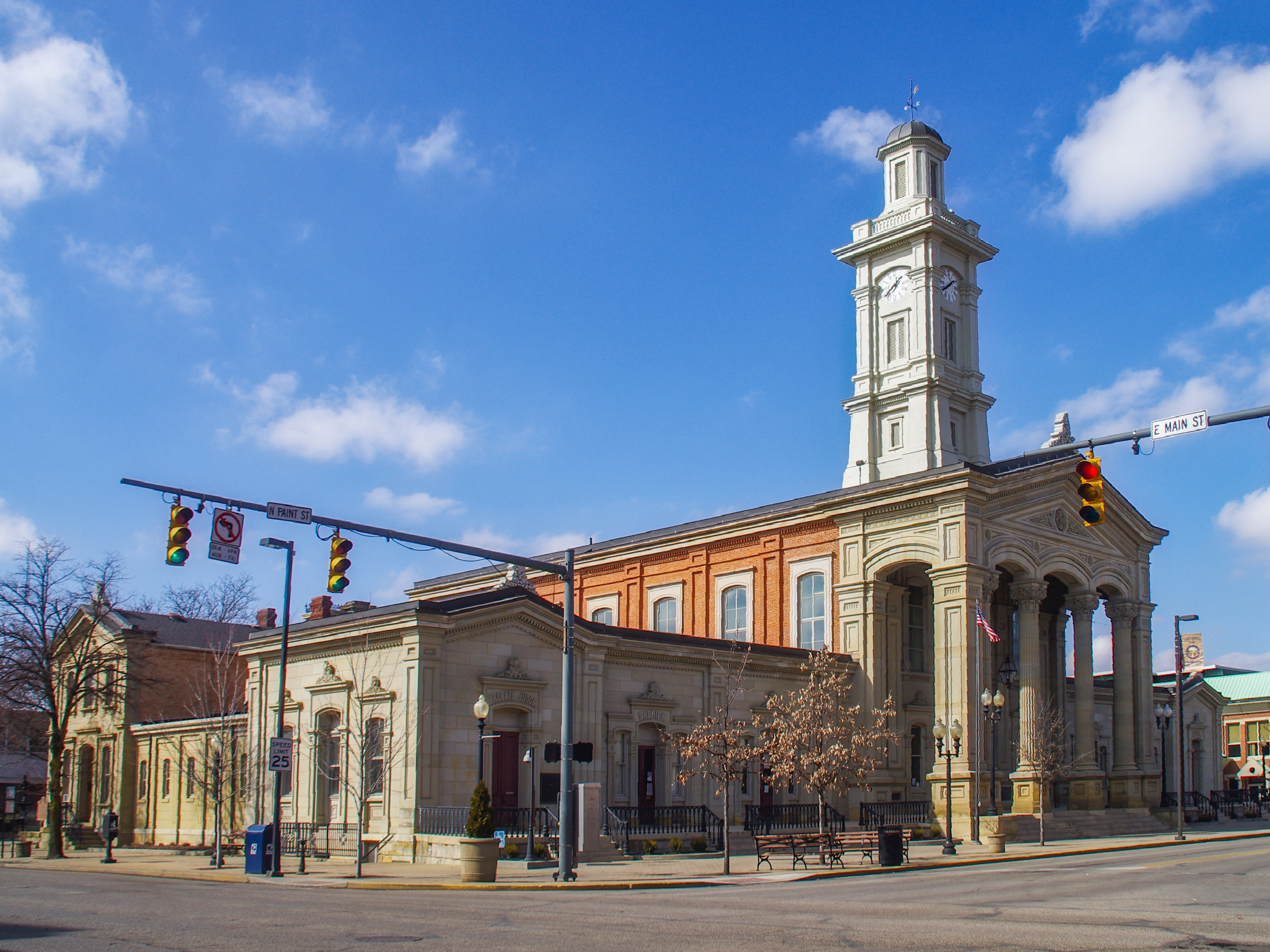
Ross County Courthouse

Chillicothe has several public parks, including Yoctangee Park, Patrick Park, Poland Park, Strawser Park, Manor Park, Goldie Gunlock Park, Pine Street Park, Veterans Memorial Park, and Western View Park.

The biggest park, Yoctangee Park, consists of numerous baseball /softball fields, tennis courts, basketball courts, and playground equipment. There is also a skatepark within Yoctangee, Henry Good skatepark, which was constructed with help from a generous donation of $65,000 from Henry Good, a local Chillicothe citizen.

Chillicothe's floodwall, protecting the city from floods of the Scioto River, has a 5.0-mile-long paved bike path. This path connects to the Tri-County Triangle Trail which currently is 30.3 miles long, measured from Bridge St. (SR 159) in Chillicothe, passing through Frankfort and then to Christman Park near Washington Court House in Fayette County, Ohio. The Tri-County Triangle Trail's goal is to connect Chillicothe and Greenfield.

Hopewell Culture National Historical Park is found on the north end of the city. The park is administered by the National Park Service and has a large concentration of Native American earthworks.

== Sports ==
The Chillicothe Paints are a baseball team that was established in February 1993. The team was previously a member of the Frontier League, playing there from its founding until 2008. They were one of the original teams in the league. The Paints are now a member of the summer collegiate Prospect League, The Paints play their home games at V.A. Memorial Stadium, which opened in 1954.

V.A. Memorial Stadium has hosted a number of other events, including the Mid-American Conference baseball tournament from 2008 to 2011, along with high school soccer and baseball playoff games for the Ohio High School Athletic Association (OHSAA).

== Government ==
Chillicothe is governed by a mayor–council structure in which the mayor is elected separately from the members of the city council. Chillicothe's mayor is Luke Feeney (D) and council president is Kevin Shoemaker (D).

== Education ==
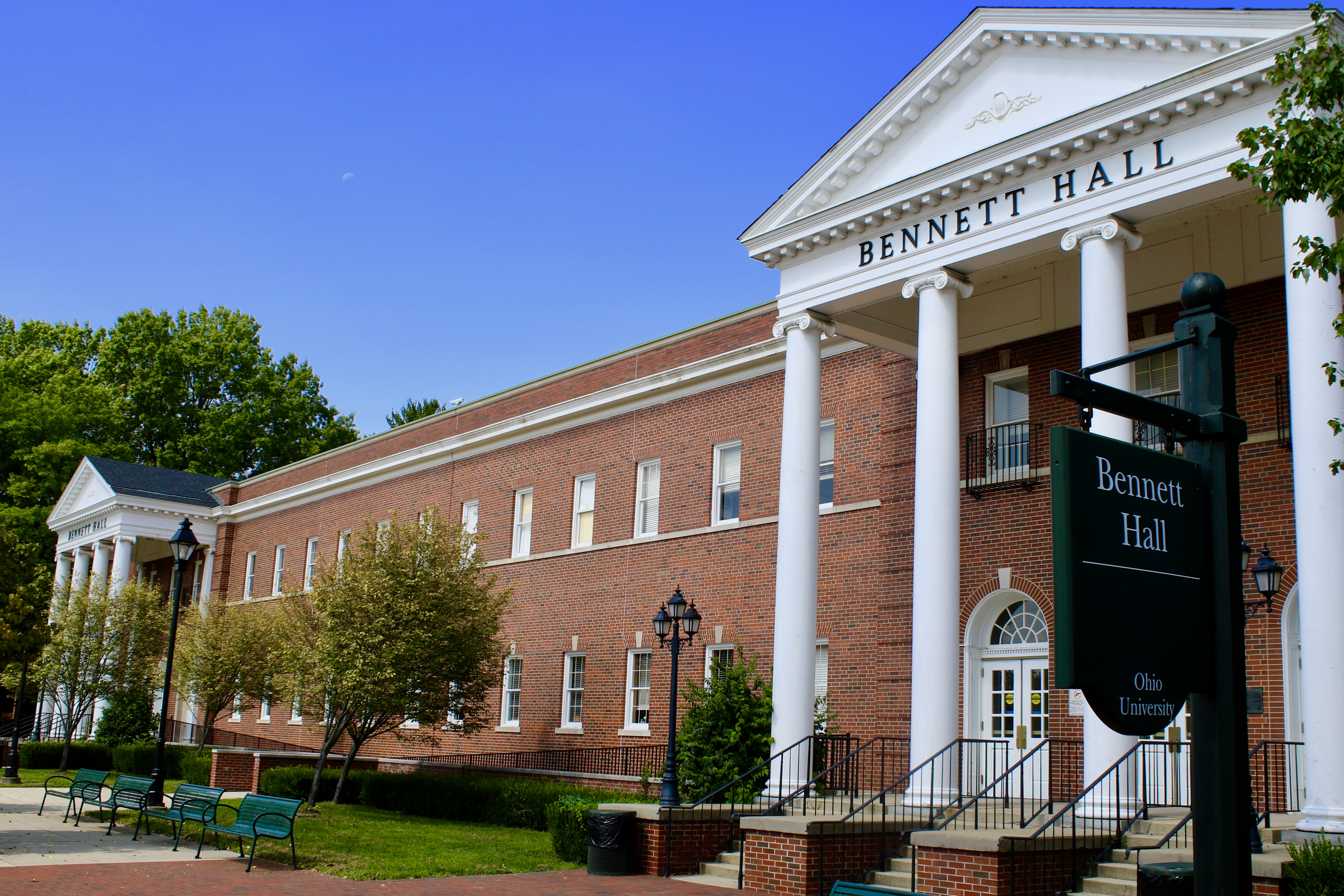
Bennett Hall at Ohio University – Chillicothe

Part of the municipality is in the Union-Scioto Local School District. The public Chillicothe City School District, which covers the majority of the municipality, operates five primary and secondary schools for children in the city. Bishop Flaget School is a private Catholic school for students in grades prekindergarten through 8th. Ross County Christian Academy was formed in 2007 and now offers K through 12th grade at two sites.

Chillicothe is home to Pickaway-Ross Career & Technology Center, a vocational-technical school founded in 1974. Ohio University – Chillicothe is a regional campus of Ohio University founded in 1946. It was the first regional campus in Ohio. The campus has an annual enrollment of approximately 2,000 students. Chillicothe is also home to the Recording Workshop, an audio engineering school.

Chillicothe is also served by the main branch and Northside branch of Chillicothe and Ross County Public Library.

== Infrastructure ==
=== Transportation ===
The Ross County Airport is located six nautical miles (6.9 mi; 11 km) northwest of Chillicothe's central business district.

== Notable people ==
- Chet Allen, actor
- William Allen, Governor, Senator, and U.S. Representative for Ohio
- Thomas M. Anderson, U.S. Army major general
- William Marshall Anderson, lawyer and explorer who helped plan the New Virginia Colony in Mexico
- James H. Baker, Ohio and Minnesota state politician
- Drew Basil, gridiron football player
- Scott Bailes, Major League Baseball player
- Henry Holcomb Bennett, writer, journalist, and poet
- John Bennett, writer and illustrator
- William K. Bond, U.S. Representative for Ohio
- Charles Elwood Brown, U.S. Army colonel and Ohio state politician
- William B. Brown, Ohio Supreme Court justice
- Henry Brush, Ohio Supreme Court justice and Ohio state politician
- John Carey, Ohio state politician
- Harold K. Claypool, businessman and U.S. Representative for Ohio
- Horatio C. Claypool, U.S. Representative for Ohio
- Carrie Williams Clifford, author, women's rights and civil rights activist
- Edward Cook, pole vaulter at the 1908 Summer Olympics
- Greg Cook, National Football League player
- Joseph Carter Corbin, journalist, educator, and conductor for the Underground Railroad
- Jessup Nash Couch, Ohio Supreme Court justice
- William Creighton Jr., Ohio state politician and judge for the United States District Court of Ohio
- William H. Davis, educator and the first African-American candidate for governor of West Virginia
- Lewis Deschler, first Parliamentarian of the United States House of Representatives
- Lawrence Dixon, jazz musician
- Albert Douglas, U.S. Representative for Ohio
- Edwin Dun, foreign agricultural advisor to Meiji Japan
- Sarah Jane Woodson Early, educator, author, black nationalist, and temperance activist
- Richard Enderlin, musician, U.S. Army soldier, and Medal of Honor recipient
- John Clay Entrekin, Ohio state politician
- Martha Finley, educator and author
- Joseph Scott Fullerton, lawyer, officer in the U.S. Army, and leader at the Freedmen's Bureau
- Bobby Fulton, professional wrestler
- Samuel Galloway, U.S. Representative for Ohio and Ohio Secretary of State
- Thomas Gibson, first Ohio State Auditor
- John Ulrich Giesy, physician and writer
- Frederick Grimke, Ohio Supreme Court justice
- James Grubb, delegate to the Ohio Constitutional Convention of 1802
- Joseph Hanks, U.S. Army soldier and Medal of Honor recipient
- Ben Hartsock, NFL player and color analyst
- Lucy Webb Hayes, wife of president Rutherford B. Hayes and 23rd First Lady of the United States
- Eston Hemings, suspected illegitimate mixed-race child of Thomas Jefferson
- James Leo Herlihy, novelist, playwright, and actor
- Michael Hess, rower at the 1976 Summer Olympics
- Tokey Hill, karateka
- Benjamin Hough, Ohio State Auditor and state politician
- Albert E. Herrnstein, college football player and coach
- John Herrnstein, Major League Baseball player
- Frederick K. Humphreys, physician, homeopath, and businessman
- Ed Hunsinger, NFL player and coach
- Dard Hunter, papermaker, printmaker, and paper artist
- Newt Hunter, MLB player, couch, and scout
- Donald F. Hyde, president of the Grolier Club and Bibliographical Society of America
- Billy Ireland, cartoonist
- John Wayles Jefferson, suspected mixed-race grandson of Thomas Jefferson
- Neil Johnston, NBA player and NBA All-Star
- Dave Juenger, NFL player
- Edward King, Ohio state politician
- Rufus King, president of the University of Cincinnati
- James Mason, neo-Nazi
- Nathaniel Massie, land surveyor, founder of Chillicothe, first speaker of the Ohio Senate and member of the Chillicothe Junto
- Duncan McArthur, U.S. Army brigadier general and Ohio governor
- Meade McClanahan, Los Angeles City Council member
- Charles McDougall, U.S. Army officer
- Florence McLandburgh, writer and poet
- Jeremiah McLene, Ohio Secretary of State and U.S. Representative
- Joseph Miller, U.S. Representative for Ohio
- Thaddeus A. Minshall, Ohio Supreme Court justice
- Dorothea Rhodes Lummis Moore, physician, writer, newspaper editor and humane society activist
- Chip Mosher, educator, poet, and newspaper columnist
- Gardner Murphy, psychologist, president of the American Psychological Association and the Society for Psychical Research
- Robert C. Murphy, U.S. Army colonel
- William Sumter Murphy, lawyer and chargé d'affaires to the Republic of Texas
- Lawrence T. Neal, U.S. Representative for Ohio
- Elbie Nickel, NFL player
- David Leroy Nickens, freed slave and the first African-American licensed minister in Ohio
- Nellie O'Donnell, educator, clubwoman, and politician
- Henry Orth, American Professional Football Association player
- John Parsons, former FBI Ten Most Wanted Fugitive
- Craig Payne, professional boxer
- Oscar G. Peters, businessman
- Lerton Pinto, MLB player
- John Poff, MLB player
- Donald Ray Pollock, author
- Ray Pryor, Ohio state representative
- Frederick Madison Roberts, businessman and first African-American elected to the California State Assembly
- John Rook, radio programmer and businessman
- Ev Rowan, NFL player
- John Henry Ryan, Washington state representative
- William Edwin Safford, educator, botanist, and ethnologist
- DJ Sayre, professional darts player
- Thomas Scott, Ohio Supreme Court justice and Ohio state politician
- Don W. Sears, dean at the University of Colorado Law School
- Henry C. Segal, journalist
- John Shoemaker, Minor League Baseball player and manager
- Noel Sickles, commercial artist and cartoonist
- Joshua W. Sill, U.S. Army officer
- Joseph S. Skerrett, U.S. Navy officer
- Orland Smith, railroad executive and U.S. Army colonel
- Juliana Spahr, poet, literary critic, and editor
- Robert Williamson Steele, extralegal governor of Jefferson Territory
- Wayne Stevens, National Basketball Association player
- Burton Egbert Stevenson, author, anthropologist, and librarian
- Job E. Stevenson, Ohio state politician
- John Stockton, Michigan state politician and U.S. Army officer
- Jimmy Strausbaugh, NFL player
- Joe Sulzer, mayor of Chillicothe and Ohio state representative
- John L. Taylor, Ohio state representative
- Tecumseh, Shawnee chief and warrior likely born in the area
- Helen B. Thompson, home economist
- Allen G. Thurman, running mate of Grover Cleveland for the 1888 presidential election, president pro tempore, Ohio Senator, and Chief Justice of the Ohio Supreme Court
- Allen W. Thurman, American Association president and gubernatorial candidate for Ohio governor
- Edward Tiffin, Ohio Governor, Senator, commissioner of the United States General Land Office, Surveyor General of the Northwest Territory, and member of the Chillicothe Junto
- Carey A. Trimble, U.S. Representative for Ohio
- George C. Tyler, Theatrical producer and manager
- John I. Vanmeter, U.S. Representative for Ohio
- Garin Veris, NFL player
- Carrie Williams, educator and civil rights activist
- Nathaniel Willis, newspaper publisher and editor
- Nancy Wilson, jazz singer and actress
- Jane Frances Winn, journalist
- Nancy Mann Waddel Woodrow, writer
- Lewis Woodson, educator, minister, writer, and abolitionist
- Thomas Worthington, Ohio Governor, Senator, and member of the Chillicothe Junto
- J. Craig Wright, Ohio Supreme Court justice
- John Yang, news correspondent and journalist
- Earl Yingling, MLB player
- Nancy Zahniser, pharmacologist

== Sister city ==
- Chillicothe is the sister city of Córdoba, Veracruz, Mexico. This relationship is honored through the Foreign Exchange Student Program with students at Chillicothe High School.
- Chillicothe had an agreement with the sister city of Tulua, Valle del Cauca, Colombia. For this reason, the main lake in the city is called Lago Chilicote.

== See also ==
- Great Hopewell Road
- USS Chillicothe
- Chillicothe Gazette
