= John Patterson Rea =

American journalist

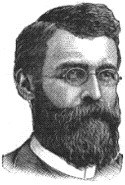
- Sketch of John Patterson Rea (1888)
- Born: October 13, 1840; Chester County, Pennsylvania
- Died: May 28, 1900 (aged 59); Nicollet Island, Minneapolis, Minnesota
- Education: AB, Ohio Wesleyan, 1864
- Occupations: Journalist and attorney

John Patterson Rea (1840–1900) was a Minnesota judge. He was also editor of the Minneapolis Tribune, and from late 1887 to 1888 Commander-in-Chief of the Grand Army of the Republic, succeeding Lucius Fairchild.

== Early life and ancestry ==
Rea was a native of the state of Pennsylvania, born October 13, 1840, in Lower Oxford Township, Chester County. He was a second cousin, once removed, of John Andrew Rea. Both were brothers in Phi Kappa Psi Fraternity. In politics, Rea was a Republican, and was "considered a true friend of that party."

Respect for the Republic ran deep in the Rea family. John was the son of Samuel Andrew Rea and Mary Patterson; great grandson of John Rea and Unknown Ewing, his spouse. Other forebears included Robert Patterson; Samuel Light and Mary Light; Jacob Light; and John Light. Grandfather Samuel Rea (1756–1816), brother to John Andrew Rea’s great grandmother Barbara, was a private in Captain Thomas Whiteside’s Company, Colonel Thomas Porter’s Battalion, Pennsylvania militia, fighting in the battles of Trenton, Princeton, Brandywine, Germantown and Monmouth; Samuel wintered at Valley Forge with General George Washington, assigned to the "fire detail" faking encampment while the Continental Army broke camp to avoid General Cornwallis and secure Princeton. Forebearor Robert Patterson was in the same battles, assigned to Captain Wilson's Company. John Light was secretary to the Convention at Lebanon, adopting the Lebanon Resolves on June 25, 1774, and was a member of the Committee of Safety, Lancaster County, during the Revolution. Jacob Light fought as a volunteer at the battle of Brandywine, occurring on part of his farm. After the war, he warred against the Miami nation in southern Ohio.

The Rea family prospered after the American Revolution. John Patterson Rea's father was a woolen manufacturer, and owned the factory in which John worked. The son, John, received his education, attending school until he was twenty years of age. In 1860, he emigrated to Piqua, Miami County, Ohio, where he taught school.

== Civil War service ==
On April 17, 1861, John P. Rea enlisted as a member of Company B of the Eleventh Ohio Infantry. After serving with this company for four months, he was commissioned second lieutenant of Company I, First Ohio Cavalry. Rea was commissioned Second Lieutenant on September 23, 1861, and for gallant and meritorious service he was promoted to First Lieutenant on March 12, 1862, and Major on November 23, 1863, following gallant service at Cleveland, Tennessee. Major Rea served continuously in the Army of the Cumberland until November 24, 1864, when he was obliged to resign due to poor health. He served in the regiment about three years and a half, and during that time was absent only ten days, seven as prisoner and three days on sick leave.

== Life after war ==
Following his service, he matriculated at Ohio Wesleyan University, graduating from the classical course in June, 1864. During the vacation of 1866 he entered a law office at Lancaster, Pennsylvania, as a student, and was admitted to the Pennsylvania bar in August, 1868. Rea associated with M. J. Dickey, Esquire, who later replaced the late Thaddeus Stevens as a Member of the U. S. House of Representatives. Rea himself later made a bid for the seat but lost. In 1869, Rea was appointed a notary public in Lancaster.

On April 7, 1869, Mr. Rea was appointed Assessor of Internal Revenue, 9th Pennsylvania District, by President Ulysses S. Grant, an office he held until it was abolished by law on May 12, 1873. In 1869 he was married. The Reas had no issue, but John took special interest in his cousin John Andrew Rea, joining efforts to found the New York Alpha Chapter of the Phi Kappa Psi fraternity at Cornell University in 1869. Ne was a member, Irving Literary Society. Mr. Rea continued in the practice of the law in Lancaster until December, 1875, when he removed to Minneapolis, Minnesota, where he became editor-in-chief of a prominent newspaper, the Minneapolis Tribune. He continued as editor until May, 1877, when he again resumed the practice of law.

In November 1877, he was elected Judge of Probate, Hennepin County, Minnesota, and served in that capacity until December 31, 1881. He then hung his own shingle as Rea, Kitchel & Shaw. When, in April, 1886, the judge resigned his seat on the bench of the local district court, Governor Hubbard appointed Judge Rea to fill the vacancy.

Rea enlisted in the Grand Army of the Republic, George N. Morgan Post. He was a charter member of the GAR Post in Piqua, Ohio, in December 1866, also a charter member of Gen. George H. Thomas Post 84 at Lancaster, Pa., in 1867. He later served as Commander of George N. Morgan Post No. 4. In 1881-1882, he served as Senior Vice President of the Minnesota Department; and then Department Commander, 1883 and Senior Vice Commander-in-Chief in 1884. He was elected Commander-in-Chief at St. Louis, Missouri in 1887.

== Death and burial ==
Rea died at Nicollet Island, Minnesota, May 28, 1900. He is buried beneath a monument in the Little Britain Presbyterian Church cemetery in southern Lancaster County, Pennsylvania, about three miles west of his place of birth, the same hometown as John Andrew Rea.
