= Festis =

Festis may refer to:

- Festi, botnet
- Festus (disambiguation)
