= Timeline of the name Judea =

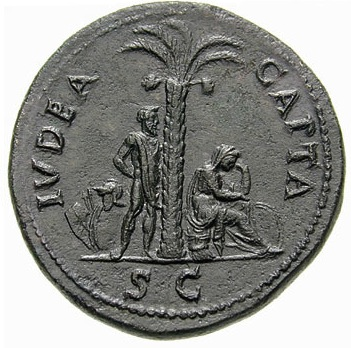
Reverse of a Roman coin from 71 CE bearing the inscription IVDEA CAPTA ("Judaea conquered)"

This article presents a timeline of the name Judea as a place name for an area in the Levant, based on an incomplete list of notable historical references across the region's various time periods.

== Historical references ==
=== Ancient period ===
- c. 740-732 BCE: King Ahaz's seal: "(belonging) to ’Aḥaz (son of) Yehotam, king of Judah"
- 733 BCE: Nimrud Tablet K.3751
- 721-705 BCE: Sargon II's Prisms: "Together with the rulers of Philistia, Judah, Edom, Moab, and those who live on islands and bring tribute and tamartu gifts to my lord Ashur-they sent countless evil lies and unseemly speeches with their bribes to Pir'u, king of Egypt-a potentate, incapable to save them-to set him at enmity with me and asked him to be an ally."
- c. 716-686 BCE: King Hezekiah bulla: "Belonging to Hezekiah, (son of) Ahaz, king of Judah"
- 700 BCE: Azekah Inscription: "[Ashur, my lord, support]ed me {Sargon} and to the land of Ju[dah I marched. In] the course of my campaign, the tribute of the k[ings...] the district [of Hezek]iah of Judah..."
- 690 BCE: Sennacherib's Annals
- c. 680–669 BCE: Esarhaddon Prism Inscriptions, Prism B, column 5, line 55: "Manasseh (mme-na-si-i), king of Judah (KUR ia-ú-di)"
- c. 668-627 BCE: Annals of Ashurbanipal, Cylinder C, col. 1, line 25: "Minsê (Manasseh), king of Judah"
- 600 BCE: Arad ostraca, Ostracon 6: "The king of Judah should know that we are unable to send the..."
- 595 BCE: Babylonian Chronicles: "Year 7, month Kislimu: The king of Akkad moved his army into Hatti land, laid siege to the city of Judah... and the king took the city on the second day of the month Addaru. He appointed in it a (new) king of his liking, took heavy booty from it and brought it into Babylon."
- c. 595-570 BCE: Jehoiachin's Rations Tablets: "Ya’u-kīnu, king of the land of Yahudu" (Babylonian "Jehoiakhin, king of Judah")
- 586-539 BCE: Yehud (Babylonian province): The Babylonians rendered the name Judah in Aramaic as Yehud and established it as a Babylonian administrative province.
- 572-477 BCE: Al-Yahudu Tablets: The tablets are named after the central settlement mentioned in the documents, āl Yahudu (Akkadian "The town of Judah").
- c. 550-501 BCE: Khirbet Beit Lei graffiti: "Yahweh (is) the God of the whole earth; the mountains of Judah belong to him, to the God of Jerusalem"
- 550-200 BCE: Yehud stamp impression corpus: Approximately 582 "Yehud" (the Persian designation for Judah) stamp impressions dating to the Persian and Early Hellenistic periods have been identified.
- 539-332 BCE: Yehud (Persian province): The Persians inherited the name Yehud, the Aramaic equivalent of Judah, as the official designation of the province.
- 407 BCE: Elephantine Papyrus No. 30: "To our lord Bagohi, governor of Judah, your servants Yedaniah and his colleagues the priests who are in Elephantine the Fortress..."
- 350-30 BCE: Yehud coinage
- 300 BCE–100 CE: Dead Sea Scrolls: The Hebrew term יהודה ("Yehudah", Judah/Judea) is attested across at least 74 distinct manuscripts in the extant Dead Sea Scrolls corpus.
- 300 BCE: Hecataeus of Abdera: "... But the greater number were driven into what is now called Judaea, which is not far distant from Egypt and was at that time utterly uninhabited."
- 300 BCE: Clearchus of Soli, De Somno (On Sleep), quoting Aristotle: "These people [Jews] are descended from the Indian philosophers. The philosophers, they say, are in India called Calani, in Syria by the territorial name of Jews; for the district which they inhabit is known as Judaea. Their city has a remarkably odd name: they call it Hierusaleme."
- 280 BCE: Manetho, History of Egypt (Aegyptiaca): "There, dreading the power of the Assyrians who were at that time masters of Asia, they built in the land now called Judaea a city large enough to hold all those thousands of people, and gave it the name of Jerusalem."
- 141-37 BCE: Hasmonean Judea: Independent Jewish state during the Second Temple period.
- c. 100 BCE-100 CE: Uzziah tablet: "To this place were brought the bones of Uzziah the king of Judah do not open!"
- 1st-cent. BCE: Alexander Polyhistor: According to Stephanus Byzantius, Alexander Polyhistor states that the name Judaea derives from that of the children of Semiramis, Juda and Idumaea.
- 37 BCE: Marcus Terentius Varro, Res Rusticae: "Swallows and storks, for instance, which bear in Italy, do not bear in all lands. Surely you are aware that the date-palms of Syria bear fruit in Judea but cannot in Italy."
- 20 BCE: Strabo, Historica Hypomnemata: "After this victory Ptolemy overran other territory, and when evening fell, halted in some villages of Judaea, which he found full of women and infants..."
- 1st-cent. CE: Aramaic Scroll of Antiochus: "…In the twenty-third year of his (Antiochus Eupator) reign, in the two-hundred and thirteenth year of the rebuilding of this, God's house (Temple), he put his face to go up to Jerusalem. He then answered and said to his nobles, 'Do you not know that the Jewish people in Judea, between us, they do not worship our God, nor do they practice our customs, and they leave off from following the king’s religion for their own religion,' etc."
- 1st-cent. CE: Pilate stone: "[Po]ntius Pilatus, [Praef]ectus Iuda[ea]e" (Latin "Pontius Pilate, prefect of Judaea")
- 1st-cent. CE: Memnon of Heraclea: "And that the Romans crossed the Jonian Sea, and that Perseus the son of Philip, having succeeded to the throne of Macedonia and, because of his youth, having cancelled the agreements made with his father by the Romans, was subdued after Paulus had defeated him; how they won two battles against Antiochus king of Syria, Commagene and Judaea and expelled him from Europe.
- 43 CE: Pomponius Mela, De situ orbis (Description of the World): "Syria holds a broad expanse of the littoral, as well as lands that extend rather broadly into the interior, and it is designated by different names in different places. For example, it is called Coele, Mesopotamia, Judaea, Commagene, and Sophene."
- 50–70 CE: Pedanius Dioscorides wrote: "Balanos aurepsike... it grows in Ethiopia, Egypt, Arabia and Petra, a town in Judaea."
- 60 CE: Columella, De Re Rustica: "They say that Mysia and Libya produce enormous quantities of grain, but that the fields of Apulia and Campania are not wanting in rich crops; that Tmolus and Corycus are considered famous for the saffron-flower, and Judaea and Arabia for their precious scents..."
- 61 CE: Lucan, Pharsalia: "Cappadocia fears my standards, and Judea given to an unknown god, and effeminate Sophene, since I subdued Armenia, savage Cilicia, and the Taurus range".
- 70 CE: Judaea Capta coinage
- 76 CE: The Jewish War: Josephus describes Judea.
- 76 CE: Josephus mentions Coreae, where travelers from the interior cross into Judea.
- 78 CE: Pliny the Elder: Et hactenus Iudaea est.: "The rest of Judaea is divided into ten toparchies: Emmaus (Emmaum), Lydda (Lyddam), Joppa, Accrabim (Acrebitenam), Jufna (Gophaniticam), Timnath-serah (Thamniticam), Bethleptephenem, Orinen (the Hills), Jerusalem and Herodium."
- 80 CE: Marcus Valerius Probus, Commentary on Georgics: "Edomite palms from Idumea, that is Judea, which is in the region of Syria Palestine."
- 92 CE: Josephus writes in his Antiquities: "Arabia is a country that borders on Judea."
- 100 CE: Plutarch, Parallel Lives: "The triumph [of Pompey] was so great, that though it was divided into two days, the time was far from being sufficient for displaying what was prepared to be carried in procession; there remained still enough to adorn another triumph. At the head of the show appeared the titles of the conquered nations; Pontus Armenia, Cappadocia, Paphlagonia, Media, Colchis, the Iberians, the Albanians, Syria, Cilicia, Mesopotamia, Phoenicia, Palestine, Judea, Arabia, the pirates subdued both by sea and land."
- 100–110 CE: Tacitus, Histories: "Titus Vespasianus had been dispatched by his father from Judea while Galba was still alive."
- 127 CE: Cave of Letters, Document 16, Registration of Land: "...of the village of En-gedi in the district of Jericho in Judaea, domiciled in his own private property..."
- 128 CE: Cave of Letters, Document 18, Marriage Contract: "...both of the village of En-gedi in Judaea residing here..."
- 129 or 135 CE: Syria Palæstina was a Roman province between 135 and about 390. It was established by the merge of Roman Syria and Roman Judaea, shortly before or after the Bar Kokhba Revolt. The historical consensus is that the name was changed by Hadrian to erase the Jewish connection to the land as a form of punishment following the rebellion.
- 150 CE: Ptolemy: "Palestine (Syria) which is also called Ioudaia..."
- 189 CE: The Mishnah: "Three countries are to be distinguished in what concerns the law of removal [of seventh year produce once the growing season has past]: Judea, beyond Jordan and Galilee."
- 200 CE: Sextus Julius Africanus, cited by Eusebius in Church History 1.7.14, described Nazareth as a village of Judea. The word "Judea" here is used in a wider sense, including the country both east and west of the Jordan river.
- 211-233 CE: Cassius Dio: "This was the course of events at that time in Palestine; for this is the name that has been given from of old to the whole country extending from Phoenicia to Egypt along the inner sea. They have also another name that they have acquired: the country has been named Judaea, and the people themselves Jews."
- c. 363-370 CE: Festus, Breviarium: "Lesser Armenia, which belonged to the same king, was conquered by force, the Roman army reached Mesopotamia, an agreement was made with the Parthians, a war was waged against the Cardueni, Saracens and Arabs, the whole of Judaea was conquered, Cilicia and the [various] parts of Syria came under the rule of the Roman people, the kings of Egypt were allies."
- 365 CE: Aurelius Victor, Epitome de Caesaribus: "Vespasian ruled ten years. [...] Volgeses, King of Parthia, was compelled to peace. The Syria for which Palestina is the name, and Cilicia, and Trachia and Commagene, which today we call Augustophratensis, were added to the provinces. Judaea, too, was added."
- 370 CE: Eutropius, Breviarium historiae Romanae: "Under him [Vespasian] Judæa was added to the Roman Empire; and Jerusalem, which was a very famous city of Palestine."
- 392 CE: Epiphanius of Salamis, On Weights and Measures: "So Hadrian passed through the city of Antioch and passed through Coele-Syria and Phoenicia and came to Palestine — which is also called Judea — forty-seven years after the destruction of Jerusalem."
- 400 CE: Martianus Capella, De Nuptiis Philologiae et Mercurii: "The next country is Syria, distinguished by many names. For it is called Palaestina where it is adjacent to Arabia, and Judaea and Phoenicia..."
- 400 CE Claudian, In Eutropium: "Cilicia, Judaea, Sophene, all Rome's labours and Pompey's triumphs, are there to sell."

=== Middle Ages ===
- 1130 CE: Fetellus, "The city of Jerusalem is situated in the hill-country of Judea, in the province of Palestine"
- 1161 CE: Maimonides: "The Land of Israel is divided into three regions, and each of these three is further divided into three parts with respect to the law of removal (bi’ur). He defined them and said: The Galilee is divided into three parts: Upper Galilee, Lower Galilee, and the Valley, which is the region of Tiberias. The land of Judah likewise is divided into three parts: the Hill Country, the Lowlands, and the Valley. And Transjordan is divided into three parts: the lowland of Lod, the hill country of Lod, and from Beth-Horon to the sea."
- 1220 CE: Jacques de Vitry, History of Jerusalem: "And there are three Palestines, which are parts of Greater Syria. The first is that whose capital is Jerusalem, and this part is specially named Judaea. The second is that whose capital is Caesarea Philippi, which includes all the country of the Philistines. The third is that whose capital is Scythopolis, which at this day is called Bethshan. Moreover, both the Arabias are parts of Syria: the first is that whose capital is Bostrum; the second is that whose capital is Petra in the Wilderness."
- 1320 CE: Marino Sanuto the Elder, Liber Secretorum Fidelium Crucis: "Also, the three [parts] of Palestine are called the Syrias, of which Syria Quinta is that Palestine which is properly called Philistym. Its chief city is Caesarea, beginning from Castrum Peregrinorum and extending south along the shore of the Mediterranean as far as Gaza in the south. Syria Sexta is the second Palestine whose chief city is Jerusalem including the hill country as far as the Dead Sea and the desert of Cadesbarne. Strictly this country is called Judaea, the name of a part being given to the whole. Syria Septima is the third Palestine whose chief city is Bethsan located under Mount Gelboe near the Jordan and which [contains] Galilee and the great plain of Esdrelon"
- 1350 CE: Guidebook to Palestine (a manuscript primarily based on the 1285–1291 account of Christian pilgrim Philippus Brusserius Savonensis): "It [Jerusalem] is built on a high mountain, with hills on every side, in that part of Syria which is called Judaea and Palestine, flowing with milk and honey, abounding in corn, wine, and oil, and all temporal goods"
- 1421 CE: John Poloner "The land which we call the Holy Land came to be divided by lot among the twelve tribes of Israel, and with regard to one part was called the kingdom of Judaea..."

=== Early modern period ===
- 1544 CE: Sebastian Münster, Cosmographia: The name Judaea appears in a map of the land.
- 1563 CE: Joseph Karo, Shulchan Aruch: "There are three regions in the land of Israel distinguished one from the other for matters of marriage: Judea, the other side of the Jordan and the Galilee."
- 1590 CE: Christian van Adrichem, Theatrum Terrae Sanctae et biblicarum historiarum cum tabulis geographicis aere expressis: "Therefore, Judea, which is the most common designation of this land, is either understood as the whole Holy Land, which we have already said is called Palestine, or as a certain third part of the land, specifically called Judea."
- 1670 CE: Baruch Spinoza, Tractatus Theologico-Politicus: "The Jews even thought that some of the people whom the King of Assyria had brought into the land of Judea were torn in pieces by lions..."
- 1693 CE: Patrick Gordon (Ma FRS), Geography Anatomiz'd: "This Country [most memorable in holy Scripture, and sometimes stiled Canaan, from Canaan, the Son of Cham; sometimes the Land of Promise, because promised to Abraham and his Seed; and sometimes Judæa, from the Nation of the Jews, or People of the Tribe of Juda...]."
- 1744: Charles Thompson (fict. name.), The travels of the late Charles Thompson esq.: "I shall henceforwards, without Regard to geographical Niceties and Criticisms, consider myself as in the Holy Land, Palestine or Judea; which Names I find used indifferently, though perhaps with some Impropriety, to signify the same Country."
- 1746 CE: Modern History Or the Present State of All Nations: "Palestine, or the Holy Land, sometimes also called Judea, is bound by Mount Libanus on the north; by Arabia Deserta on the east; by Arabia Petrea on the south; and by the Mediterranean Sea on the west"
- 1779 CE: George Sale, Ancient Part of Universal History: "How Judæa came to be called also Phœnice, or Phœnicia, we have already shewn in the history of that nation..." (See Reland Palestin. illustrat.)"
- 1787 CE: Johann Gottfried Herder, Ideas for the Philosophy of the History of Mankind: "Rome gained its advantage only from the flawed politics of neighboring peoples: separately they were attacked, separately they were defeated. Rome experienced a similar fate, when its mastery of war and politics had declined; so did Judea and Egypt."

=== Modern period ===
- 1838 CE: Humphry Davy, The collected works of Sir Humphry Davy: "Judea is a high country, rising by successive terraces from a shore that is, in many places bold and lofty. Its principal eminences, Carmel, Bashan, Tabor, do not ascend into bleak and rugged heights: they are covered with villages, rich pastures, and luxuriant woods; on their slopes are copious vineyards, and in the clefts of the rocks numerous bees, feeding on their aromatic plants, deposit their honey. Traces are even found of a cultivation, by artificial terraces, equal to that which prevails in the most improved parts of the East.
- 1862 CE: Moses Hess, Rome and Jerusalem, Eighth Letter: "For just as at the time of the return from the Babylonian exile not all the Jews settled in Palestine, but the majority remained in the lands of exile, where there had been Jewish settlements since the dispersion of Israel and Judah, so need we not look forward to a larger concentration of Jews at the future restoration."
- 1891 CE: Menachem Ussishkin: "Slowly our ship advances. Jaffa is already fairly clear; it stretches along the coast from north to south. On the horizon, behind it, the hills of Judea are gradually taking shape."
- 1895 CE: Theodor Herzl: "Another thing that is to be prevented is a policy of future conquest. New Judea shall reign only by the spirit."
- 1900 CE: Ahad Ha'am: "I saw the 'new Jew' only this week, upon my return from the colonies in Judea..."
- 1903 CE: Israel Zangwill, Zion, whence cometh my help: "We may be sure the spiritual wine of Judea would again pour forth likewise—that precious vintage which the world has drunk for so many centuries."
- 1912 CE: Joseph Trumpeldor: "Yes, I want to know how many agricultural laborers there are in the Land of Israel (in Judea and the Galilee)."
- 1920 CE: Max Nordau: "West of the Jordan, in the land of Judea, there are in fact no vacant areas. All of the land suitable for agricultural cultivation is already occupied, and those who hold it are almost all Arabs."
- 1921 CE: Henrietta Szold: "The whole road from Jerusalem to the village—it isn’t a road at all—it isn’t even a path—nobody but a wise, patient donkey could find a foothold among the rolling stones—goes up and up, through the silent Judean country."
- 1930 CE: Shaw Commission: "In addition to Jerusalem, which is situated in the midst of the hills of Judea..."
- 1930 CE: Hope Simpson Enquiry: "The natural divisions of the country are: (a) The hill country of Galilee and Judea..."
- 1937 CE: Palestine Royal Commission: "The ”captivity” did not last long. In 539 B.C. Cyrus, the founder of the Persian Empire, occupied Babylon and in 538 B.C. he permitted the Judaean exiles to go back to Judaea."
- 1938 CE: Palestine Partition Commission: "We have not obtained similar information with regard to the hill country of Samaria and the rest of Judaea outside the Jerusalem Enclave..."
- 1945 CE: Survey of Palestine: "This main mountain system and the maritime plain which separates it from the sea, together with the Jordan valley and the Negeb or desert south of Judea..."
- 1947 CE: United Nations: "The boundary of the hill country of Samaria and Judea starts on the Jordan River..."

== Biblical references ==
The name occurs multiple times as a geographic region in the Hebrew Bible, in both Hebrew and Aramaic:

- Daniel 2:25, 5:13, 6:13
- Ezra 5:1, 7:14 and the "province Judah" 5:8
- Nehemiah 11:3

During the time of the New Testament, the region was a Roman province. The name Judea occurs 44 times in the New Testament.

== See also ==
- Judea (Roman province)

== Bibliography ==
- Schmidt, Francis (2001), "Palestine, Judaea or Israel", How the Temple Thinks: identity and social cohesion in ancient Judaism, A&C Black, pp. 28–31, ISBN 9781841272085
- Stern, Menaḥem (1974). Greek and Latin Authors on Jews and Judaism, vol. 1, From Herodotus to Plutarch. Israel Academy of Sciences and Humanities. ISBN 9789652080363.
- Reland, Adrien (1714), "Caput VII: De Nomine Palaestinae, and Caput VIII: De Nomine Syriae Palaestinae, Syriae et Coelesyriae", Palaestina ex monumentis veteribus illustrata, vol. 1, pp. 37–48
