= Lagonda Club =

The Lagonda Club originated in Springfield, Ohio U.S.A. in the late 19th century and continued to the early 20th century, as an exclusive club for local prominent and corporate men.

== History ==
The Lagonda Club originated in Springfield, Ohio U.S.A. in the late 19th century and continued to the early 20th century, as an exclusive club for local prominent and corporate men. Its name was derived from Lagonda (an early American settlement near Springfield) and the Lagonda Creek, where on its banks the town of Springfield was settled. "Lagonda" was a Shawnee Indian term meaning buck's horn and some point the creek was renamed Buck Creek.

Origin of the club started in May 1886. At that time, under the leadership of Rev. George W. Ziegler of the Wiley Chapel M.E. Church, he organized with church members 14 civic clubs. These clubs, called the Wiley's Chapel Clubs, were formed for the purpose of liquidating the church indebtness. One of them was the Wesley Lagonda Club with J. O. Underwood as president. Shortly after the name was shorten to Lagonda Club.

== Meeting place ==
When the Lagonda Club (an exclusive social club of prominent and businessmen) was incorporated it purchased what was known as the Cavalier corner—High and Spring streets to build their clubhouse in mind as social haven rather than the literary opportunities. The Lagonda Club Building was designed in 1893 by Frank Mills Andrews, a leading period architect who also designed the Kentucky State Capitol and the Montana State Capitol. Completed by 1895 at expense of $25,000., the Lagonda Club Building is an early example of Beaux-Arts architecture. The club's main reception hall was executed in manly fashion in the Empire style. The clubhouse, a four-story structure with a large basement, built of limestone and brick with stone molding. In October 1904, the Lagonda Club building was more open to the members of the public and while it is not denominated a "poor man's club," there was a democratic spirit that pervaded. It afforded facilities for both dances and banquets, a social center rather than an intellectual center and yet in its reading rooms copies of Springfield and metropolitan publications are available. It had rooms for indoor sports, and the wives of members enjoy the social privileges. While it has both resident and non-resident members, in order to share its advantages members had to own stock in the organization. Since many of the members belonged to other civic organizations, the Lagonda Club became more of a community center.

=== Founding Member List ===
Some earliest members were:

- J. O. Underwood-president of club.
- Edward Lyon Buchwalter, President of the Superior Drill Company and the American Seeding Machine Company, President of The Citizens National Bank of Springfield, Ohio.
- Burton J. Westcott, president of the Hoosier Drill Company, Westcott Carriage Company, Westcott Motor Company, Mayor of Springfield.
