= Festus =

Festus may refer to:

== People ==
=== Ancient world ===
- Porcius Festus, Roman governor of Judea from approximately 58 to 62 AD
- Sextus Pompeius Festus (later 2nd century), Roman grammarian
- Festus (died 305), martyr along with Proculus of Pozzuoli
- Festus (historian), Roman historian and secretary of the Emperor Valens
- Postumius Rufius Festus Avienius, a poet from Etruria

=== Modern world ===
- Festus Ayodele Adefiranye, Nigerian politician
- Festus Agu (born 1975), Nigerian retired footballer
- Festus Akinbusoye (born 1978), British politician
- Festus Arthur (born 2001), German footballer
- Festus Baise (born 1980), Hong Kong footballer
- Festus Ezeli (born 1989), Nigerian basketball player
- Festus Hommius (1576–1642), Dutch Calvinist theologian
- Festus Igbinoghene (born 1969), Nigerian Olympic athlete
- Festus Iyayi (1947–2013), Nigerian writer
- Festus Keyamo (born 1970), Nigerian lawyer, columnist and human rights activist
- Festus Limbu (born 1956), Tanzanian politician
- Festus Mbandeka, Namibian lawyer and politician
- Festus Mwangi Kiunjuri (born 1969), Kenyan politician
- Festus Mogae (1939–2026), former president of Botswana
- Festus Nwafili (born 1976), Nigerian Bishop
- Festus Ogun, Nigerian lawyer
- Festus Okotie-Eboh (1919–1966), Nigerian politician and former minister for finance
- Festus Olabode Ola (born 1956), Nigerian senator
- Festus Onigbinde (born 1942), Nigerian football manager
- Festus Perera (1931-2013), Sri Lankan Sinhala politician
- Festus Segun (1915-2024), Nigerian Anglican bishop
- Festus Simbiak (born 1952), Indonesian academic and politician
- Festus Talam (born 1994), Kenyan long-distance runner
- Festus Thomas (born 1963), Namibian politician
- Festus Tierney (1899–1973), former guard in the National Football League
- Festus Ueitele, Namibian politician
- Festus Walters (1849–1922), Ohio jurist and advocate for Gubernatorial judicial independence
- Loren D. Hagen (1946–1971), nicknamed "Festus", United States Army Special Forces officer awarded the Medal of Honor
- Drew Hankinson (born 1983), professional wrestler who used the name Festus

== Places ==
- Festus, Missouri, a town in the United States
  - Festus Memorial Airport

== Other uses ==
- Festus Haggen, a character in the American television program Gunsmoke
- "Festus", a poem by the English poet Philip James Bailey
- Festus, a character from The Heroes of Olympus series
- Festus the Leechlord, a character from Warhammer Fantasy (setting)
