= Irving Literary Society (Cornell University) =

Collegiate society (1868–1887)

- Founded: October 20, 1868; 157 years ago Cornell University
- Type: Literary
- Affiliation: Independent
- Status: Defunct
- Scope: Local
- Motto: Ἀλήθεια; Aletheia "Truth"
- Chapters: 1
- Headquarters: Society Hall (Room 10, White Hall), Cornell University; Ithaca, New York; United States

The Irving Literary Society (also known as the Irving Literary Association or simply The Irving) was a literary society at Cornell University active from 1868 to 1887. The U.S. Bureau of Education described it as a "purely literary society" following the "traditions of the old literary societies of Eastern universities."

During the period when the Cornell literary societies flourished, the Irving and its peers produced literature at a rate higher than the campus average for the next generation, leading commentators at the turn of the 20th century to question whether academic standards had fallen since the university's founding. Named after the American writer Washington Irving, the Irving Literary Society was founded on October 20, 1868, shortly after Cornell opened. Past members who went on to prominent careers included judge Morris Lyon Buchwalter, senator Joseph Benson Foraker, and the journalists John Andrew Rea and Francis Whiting Halsey.

The Irving's last public meeting was held on May 23, 1887. After that, it ceased to exist as a Cornell University student society. However, the New York Alpha chapter of the Phi Kappa Psi undergraduate fraternity at Cornell claims to have "served as steward of the Irving Literary Society since 1888".

== History ==
=== Founding ===
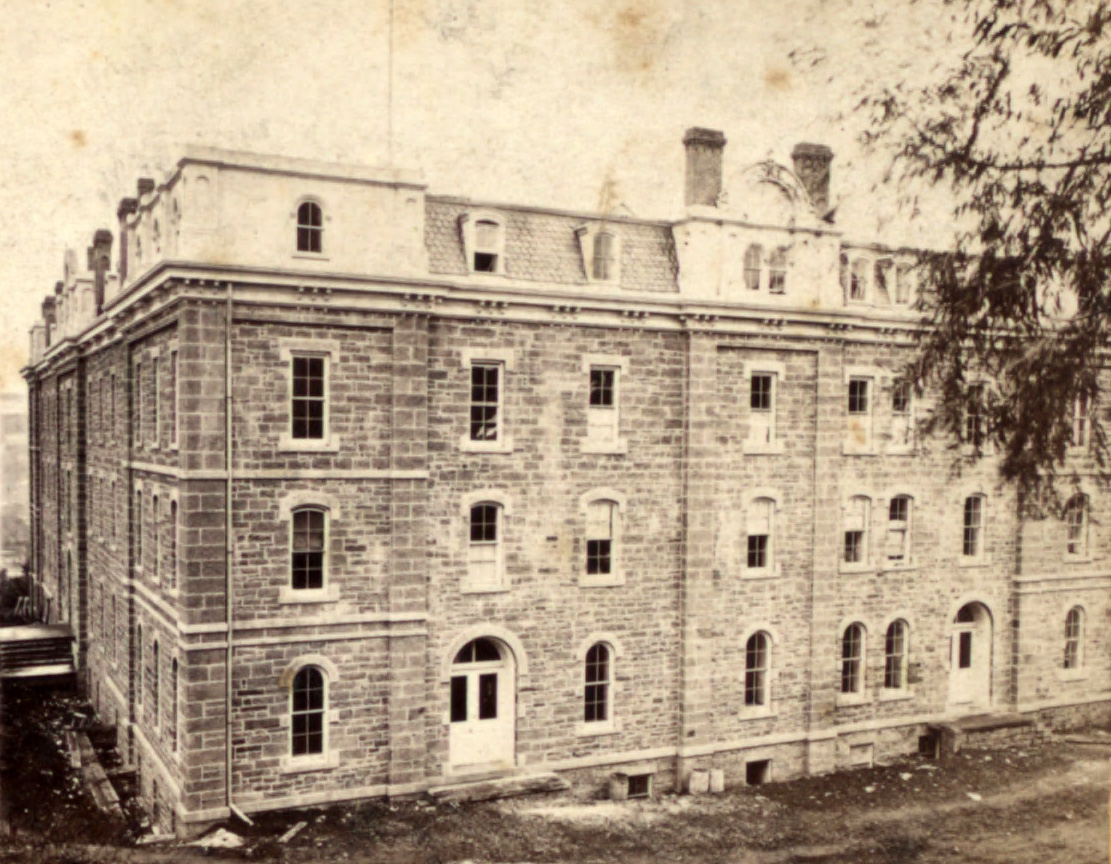
Cascadilla Place, where the Irving Literary Society was founded

Students held a preliminary meeting to organize a literary society in Room No. 4 Cascadilla Place, on October 20, 1868, some thirteen days after Cornell University opened. George F. Behringer was selected as president. Asa Bowles Clark Dickinson and Asahel Norton Fitch were also founding members.

At the second meeting on November 7, 1868, the society's name was discussed, with members equally split between the John Bright Brotherhood, honoring the English orator John Bright, and others favoring the Irving Literary Association, after Washington Irving. A compromise was struck in which the society was named after Irving, while Bright and the American orator, Charles Sumner, were admitted as the first honorary members.

In 1930, John Andrew Rea recalled:

What I was thinking of most at that time was founding a fraternity and a literary society. I was Phi Kappa Psi, and wanted Foraker and Buchwalter to come on and join me in founding the New York Alpha, which we did, and we had a great bunch of boys. The literary society was first in time. Mr. Williams of our class agitated for the organization of a society under the name "Philanthea". I was appointed to the committee to report on the name for the second society. We did not want a Latin or Greek name, for this was a new institution, one that had never existed before. After much discussion, we went to Mr. White [ Andrew Dickson White ] and told him we were starting a society, and he suggested we use the name of "Irving", after the founder of American literature. The committee accepted it and reported it to the boys, and so it was called the Irving Literary Society. I have no record of the demise of the Irving . . . . There were no other activities than those of the fraternity and the literary society. That was all we knew anything about; no athletics the first year. The literary society had public exhibitions with essays, orations, and debates. They were held downtown.

The first question put to the society in 1869 was "Resolved, the erection of a theatre was not in the interest of promoting correct morals within the University community." The answer was nodded in the affirmative. Initially, the Irving's proceedings were held on Friday evenings at Deming Hall, on what is now the Ithaca Commons. Special events were held at the Cornell Public Library around the corner.

In 1870, the Irving Literary Association changed its name to the Irving Literary Society. Beginning in February 1870, the Irving and the Philaletheian, another literary society at Cornell, held an annual debating contest against each other. This event has been noted as one reason the quality of debate was so high on campus between 1869 and 1884. Later, it shared Society Hall with the other literary societies at Cornell.

By 1871, the society had initiated 55 members. The Irving was formed as a male-only society, but following the lead of Cornell's Curtis Literary Society (founded in 1872), membership in the Irving became open to women students and remained so throughout its existence. In 1873, members of the Curtis, Irving, and Philaletheian societies jointly founded and ran The Cornell Review, "a repository of original articles, essays, stories, Woodford orations, elaborate discussions, and poems."

William R. Lazenby, a professor at Ohio State University, wrote that the Irving Literary Society was in debt and in decline when he was a freshman at Cornell in 1870. However, William Hankins, F. W. Hasley, A. J. Lamoureux, and Daniel Elmer Salmon revived the society, which soon flourished. Lazenby noted that the Irving "was an excellent school for training men to think upon their feet, and to express their thoughts with force and clearness."

=== Final years ===
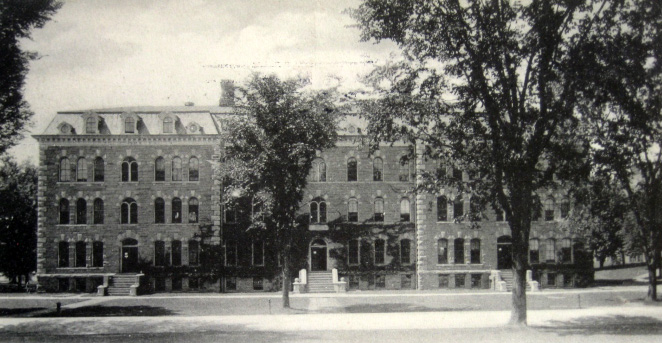
Andrew Dickson White Hall which housed Society Hall, the main meeting room for Cornell's 19th century literary societies, including the Irving

By 1885, the other main literary societies at Cornell—the Adelpi, Curtis, and Philalatheian—had ceased to exist. Around the time of the Curtis' demise in 1881, an address by President White attributed the general decline in student interest for these societies to the growth of fraternities and sororities, decreasing importance placed on the power of oratory, and the development of the seminar system in the university. The Irving continued until 1887, but in 1884 the Ithaca Daily Democrat was lamenting its decline, writing:

The Irving literary society met last evening, but was poorly attended. This institution should be one of the most prosperous student societies in the college, but strange to say, it has deteriorated in point of numbers, and its management has fallen into the hands of technical instead of literary students.

With the move away from the English collegiate model and toward the German seminar system and a greater dedication of resources to the sciences and engineering (including agricultural sciences), campus leaders increasingly expressed concern about falling standards of recitation, elocution, and oratory at Cornell. There was a quickened pace of Irving exercises during the academic years 1885, 1886, and 1887.

To appeal to broader audiences, the Irving sponsored "popular entertainment" events rather than just the traditional literary society genre. During the fall term of 1886, the society hosted Professor Spenser Baird Newberry and his stereopticon entertainments, most notably a show featuring vistas of Athens, Constantinople, and Egypt. Newberry’s presentations proved popular enough for the Irving to charge admission. However, the social activities were balanced by a more traditional format. By the winter of 1887, the members had settled on a two-part presentation. The first part would include exercises in parliamentary practice, a paper reading, and perhaps a recitation or debate. Part two would include a social hour with music. Papers included topics such as "Cornell University Lake Survey", "Political History of Japan", "Small Nations", "Influence of the Jesuits on the Five Nations", and "Etching".

The Irving Literary Society's last public meeting was held on May 23, 1887. After that, it ceased to exist as a Cornell University society. However, the Cornell University Residence Plan of 1966 describes the Irving Literary Society as "doing business as the New York Alpha chapter of the Phi Kappa Psi fraternity at Cornell University". In addition, the New York Alpha chapter of Phi Kappa Psi describes itself as having "served as steward of the Irving Literary Society since 1888". The fraternity chapter has also claimed to have been "founded in 1868 through the Irving Literary Society."

== Symbols ==
The society's motto was Ἀλήθεια or Aletheia or "Truth".

== Activities ==
=== Washington Irving's birthday and Cornell's first commencement ===
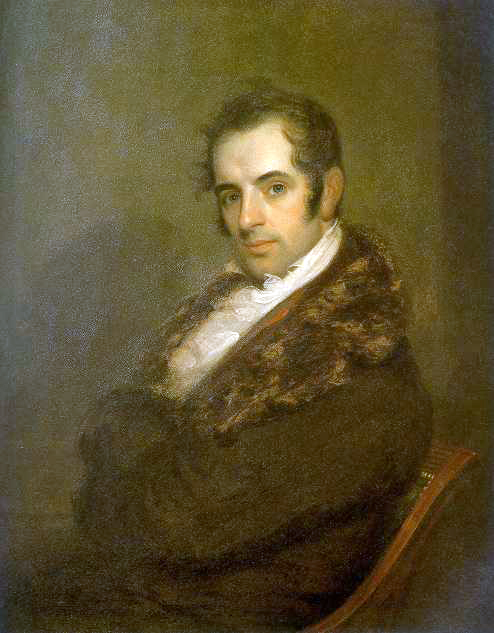
Washington Irving

The Irving’s first major event was a celebration of Washington Irving’s Birthday on April 3, 1869, at the Cornell Public Library in downtown Ithaca, New York. Ezra Cornell and Andrew Dickson White both attended. The first oration, "Aristocracy of Sex", explored the natural law-based presumption of male supremacy in America and concluded that the assumption was based solely on "the prejudice of man." After a musical interlude came an essay on "Our Capital and the War", recalling Washington, D.C. during the American Civil War, including the assassination of President Abraham Lincoln. Then came an oration on "Our National Tendency", namely the tendency of emerging nations to undergo an income a widening gap between rich and poor, and social violence that followed that widening. This delivery was described by the society's secretaries in The Cornell Era as "forcible, the orator receiving vigorous applause". The high point of the first event was a reading from Washington Irving's first major book, A History of New-York from the Beginning of the World to the End of the Dutch Dynasty, by Diedrich Knickerbocker by founding member Asa Bowles Clark Dickinson.

The event closed with an oration by Morris Lyons Buchwalter, "On The Poles".

During the 1869 commencement week, the Irving Literary Society invited Theodore Tilton of the New York Independent to speak the evening before the graduation exercises. Society members gathered with guests again at the Cornell Public Library in downtown Ithaca. Tilton spoke on "the human mind, and how to use it." The following day, Tilton stayed for the ceremonies as members of the Irving Literary Society spoke at the actual commencement ceremony. Morris Buchwalter spoke on "The Civil Sabbath Law", Joseph Foraker spoke on "Three Hundred Lawyers", and John Andrew Rea gave "A Plea for the Artist". Buchwalter’s comments were so inflammatory that the university's President Andrew Dickson White took to the platform before Foraker came to the dais and distanced the trustees from Buchwalter's oration.

=== Other early exercises ===
In mid-October 1869, the first regular meeting of the Irving Literary Society was called “A Feast of Reason”. Festus Walters gave a well-received oration, followed by a scholarly essay. The question: — ”Resolved that Byron was not a great poet.” Thomas Wilson Spence earnestly argued the question in the affirmative; Kirk Ingram in the negative. The question being settled in the negative, Byron was placed in rank with Milton, Shakespeare, Dante, and Goethe, which according to the Cornell Era, “no doubt will cause Byron, if his love of adulation has been interred with his bones, to rest easily in his coffin. The number of visitors was unusually large, and manifested great interest in the discussion. The topic for discussion for next Friday evening, is:— ‘Resolved that class feeling and distinctions should not be encouraged in the University.’ A contest was also held between the Irving and its rival, Philalatheian, over the question “Resolved, that increased wealth is beneficial to the morals of a people.”

In 1870, the Irving debated capital punishment and the question, “Resolved, That ladies should be admitted to our colleges.” By the end of the second academic year, the Irving diversified its activities. May 1870 saw the first extemporaneous orations, as well as miscellaneous essays such as Edgar Jayne’s “Secret Musings.” In place of the regular debate, the Irving also went into committee-of-the-whole on the Irish question, argument extending beyond midnight. The last event of academic year 1869–1870 was a debate on the protective tariff. Later that year, it was resolved after debate that the tendency toward world societies was toward ‘the new Democracy.’

=== Later exercises ===
Harry Falkenau who played a Chopin Nocturne at the Irving's May Day celebrations in 1884

Entering its third decade, the Irving was the largest of the three Cornell literary societies. It enrolled 26 members during the fall term of 1880. The Cornell Daily Sun noted the benefit of the training provided by the experience, the pleasant rooms assigned by university administrators, and the hearty support provided by the Cornell faculty. Despite these benefits, the Irving and its peers were losing the interest of the Cornell student body. That only fourteen percent of Cornell students were active in the societies was seen as an intellectual weakness.

Chief among the greatest distractions were the Greek letter fraternities, whose members lacked time or interest in activities outside their fraternal societies. With insufficient numbers, society members were required to present or compete every three weeks. The resulting literary activity was thought to be accordingly weak, further impacting the quality and subsequent attendance of the meetings. In this environment, the Irving members invited the Cornell community to listen to debates over questions such as "Which has done most toward the promotion of civilization, Art or Science?"

The elocutionist Robert P. Williams of New York City read before the Irving the same season. At the same time, Cornell students attending the University of Michigan noted that for all their weaknesses, the Irving and its peers compared well against Michigan's literary societies, noting "The literary societies—The Webster and The Jeffersonian—are well attended, but neither have as good or as pleasant rooms as the Irving or Curtis. The grade of exercises is, if anything, lower than in those just mentioned.".

The following spring 1881 term, the Irving and the Cornell Club (a debating society) resumed their "union meetings" to bring the best of both organizations together for one evening's entertainment. In May 1882, the Irving hosted a discussant, Professor Shackford, at Association Hall. The lecture on Transcendentalism gained the interest of Professor Franklin Benjamin Sanborn. Woodrow Wilson also served as a discussant during this period, in 1886. Extemporaneous addresses began to resemble those by toastmasters, with topics such as "How to Run A Sailboat". Readings came from current fiction, and poetry. "The Critic" still gave his weekly (and scathing) reviews of recent publications, and future music critic and bibliophile, Harry Falkenau, among others, provided music.

Another example of Society activity during this period was the debate on the question, "Resolved, that indiscriminate personal eulogies and public demonstration are unsuitable methods of rewarding great achievements". Arguing in the affirmative was Elias Leavenworth Elliot, future inventor. In 1887, the Irving debated "Resolved, is plagiarism morally wrong?" During this period, society leadership overlapped with the university's literary pursuits, including with The Cornell Daily Sun.

== Members' later careers ==
Francis Whiting Halsey's Seeing Europe with Famous Authors (1914)

After graduating from Cornell, many Irving members had careers reflecting the literary and oratorical activities of the society. Harry Falkenau (1885), an early defender of Walt Whitman's poetry, went on to a career as a music critic for the Chicago Herald and later as the owner of an antiquarian book shop in Chicago. Francis Whiting Halsey (1873) was a prolific journalist and author who wrote for The New York Times from 1880 to 1896 and served as its literary editor from 1892. Dewitt John Brigham (1870) was the editor of the Midland Monthly, the Iowa State Librarian, the American Counsel at Aix-La-Chapelle, and an author who wrote The Youth of Old Age (1933), awarded outstanding contribution by an Iowa author in 1934.

John Bogert Laurence (1872) was the commercial editor, vice-president, and managing editor of the Kansas City Journal. James L. Knapp (1880) was the night editor of the Baltimore Sun and worked for the Philadelphia Evening Public Ledger for over 55 years, eventually becoming its city editor.

Judge Morris Lyon Buchwalter

The Irving produced at least one member who later excelled in the mechanics of literary production. William Henry French was an agent and assistant general manager for the Associated Press in Chicago and New York City and later the director of the type foundry Barnhart Bros. & Spindler, president and director of St. Louis Printer's Supply Company, and director and vice president of Fundicion Mexicana de Tipos in Mexico City.

Several of the Irving's former members and orators entered the legal profession, including the third president of the Irving Literary Society, Morris Lyon Buchwalter, and his college roommate and fellow society member, Joseph Benson Foraker. Edward L. Parker (1871) was a trial lawyer and lecturer in the Buffalo Law School. Frank Harding (1881) was a lawyer, deputy tax collector for Middletown, New York, and became president of the Orange County Trust Company.

== Notable members ==
- John Bright (honorary), Chancellor of the Duchy of Lancaster, President of the Board of Trade, and one of the greatest orators of his generation
- Morris Lyon Buchwalter, judge
- Frank Wigglesworth Clarke, scientist and chemist, called the "father of geochemistry"
- Theodore B. Comstock the first president of University of Arizona, consulting engineer, and geologist.
- Julius Chambers, author, editor, journalist, and travel writer
- Charles d'Autremont, mayor of Duluth, Minnesota 1892.
- Harry Falkenau, classical composer, music critic, and bibliophile
- Franklin Ferriss, Judge of the Supreme Court of Missouri
- Joseph B. Foraker, Governor of Ohio and member of the United States Senate
- Francis Whiting Halsey, author, foreign editor and literary editor with The New York Times, and a literary agent with Funk and Wagnalls
- John Andrew Rea, editor-in-chief of The Olympian and journalist with the Chicago Tribune and the New York Herald
- Harris J. Ryan, electrical engineer and a professor at Cornell University and Stanford University
- Daniel Elmer Salmon, veterinarian with the United States Department of Agriculture
- Thomas Wilson Spence, Wisconsin State Assembly
- Charles Sumner (honorary), abolitionist and member of the United States Senate
- Festus Walters, judge of the Ohio Courts of Common Pleas
- J. De Witt Warner, U.S. House of Representatives

== See also ==
- College literary societies
- Cornell literary societies
- History of Cornell University
- List of college literary societies
- List of Cornell University fraternities and sororities
