= Ogun (surname) =

Ògún
- Gender: Male
- Language: Yoruba

Origin
- Origin: Nigerian
- Meaning: Ògún Lákáayé: The Yorùbá god of iron, of war, and of metallurgy.
- Region of origin: South West, Nigeria

Ògún (audio) is a Nigerian name referring to Ògún Lákáayé, the deity of iron, war, hunting and metallurgy in the Yoruba religion. It is a male name of one of the Yoruba Oriṣa(s). The name Ògún is a distinctive and powerful name and primarily used among the families of Ògún devotees, or from families whose professions stem from hunting, warfare, metallurgy and metalworking. The diminutive forms are many, as Ògún serves as a prefix in any names originating from the Ògún worship lineage such as Ògúndayọ, Ògúnṣẹyẹ, Ògúnfẹmi, Ògúnṣọla, Ògúntade, Ògúnyẹmi, Ògúntomi, etc.

== Notable individuals with the name ==
- Festus Ogun (fl. 2021), Nigerian lawyer
- Maupe Ogun (fl. 2009), Nigerian media personality
- Murat Ongun (born 1975), Turkish journalist
- Özden Öngün (born 1978), Turkish footballer
- İpek Ongun (born 1942), Turkish novelist
- Sergius Ogun (born 1963), Nigerian politician
