= Edward Lyon Buchwalter =

US Army soldier & businessman (1841–1933)

Capt Edward Lyon Buchwalter
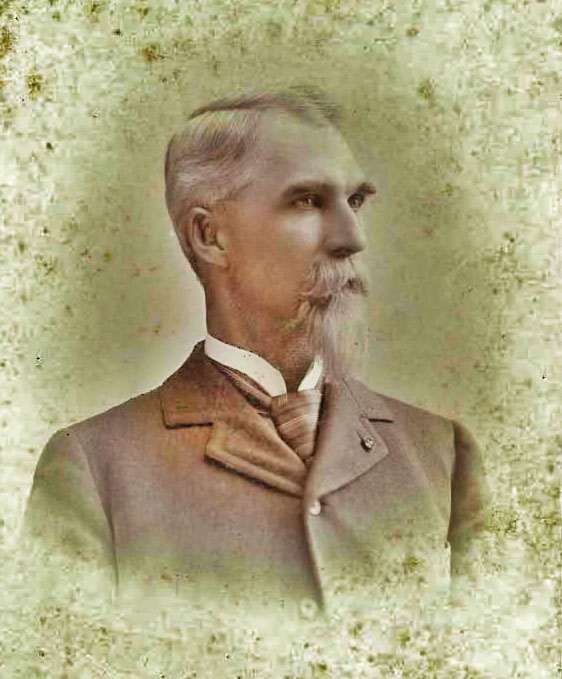
- Capt. Edward Lyon Buchwalter
- Born: June 1, 1841; Hallsville, Ohio, United States
- Died: October 4, 1933 (aged 92)
- Resting place: Ferncliff Cemetery & Arboretum, Springfield, Ohio
- Education: Ohio University
- Occupations: Businessman & soldier
- Spouse(s): Clementine Cordelia Berry (m. 1868; died 1912) Marilla Andrews (m. 1914)
- Relatives: Morris Lyon Buchwalter (brother)
- Military career
- Allegiance: United States
- Branch: Union Army
- Service years: 1862-1866
- Rank: Captain
- Unit: 114th Ohio Infantry
- Conflicts: American Civil War; Vicksburg Campaign; Battle of Chickasaw Bayou; Battle of Fort Hindman; Battle of Arkansas Post; Battle of Port Gibson; Battle of Raymond; Battle of Champion Hill; Battle of Big Black River Bridge; Battle of Gettysburg

Capt. Edward Lyon Buchwalter (June 1, 1841 – October 4, 1933) was a Union Captain in the American Civil War, corporate figure, banker and farmer. He served in the 114th Ohio Infantry as lieutenant, later Captain of the 53rd Mississippi Colored Volunteers Infantry under General William T. Sherman and General Ulysses S. Grant. He was President of Superior Drill Company, President of American Seeding Machine Company and first President of The Citizens National Bank of Springfield, Ohio.

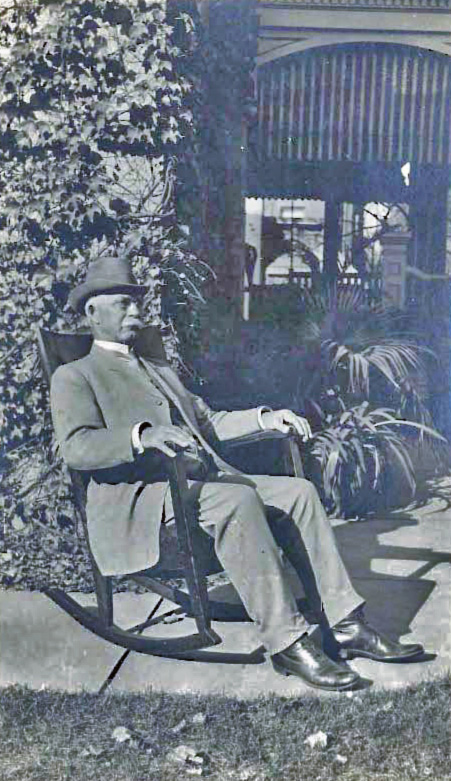
Edward Lyon Buchwalter, at his home in Springfield, Ohio

== Early life ==
Capt. Edward Lyon Buchwalter was born and raised on the Buchwalter farmstead in Hallsville, Ohio, Ross County, Ohio, June 1, 1841. The eldest of Levi Buchwalter (March 5, 1814, Schuylkill County, PA - December 1900 in Ross County, Ohio) and Margaret Lyon. Lineage of the Buchwalter family traces back to residents of one of the German-speaking cantons of Switzerland, from which republic the progenitors of the American branch came to this country in 1710, and established residence in Pennsylvania. Edward had two brothers, Morris Lyon Buchwalter and Captain Luther Morris Buchwalter, an officer with the Ohio Volunteers.

=== Education ===
He was educated at public schools in Hallsville and enrolled in Ohio University, at Athens, Ohio at the inception of the American Civil War, he did not long deny manifestation of his youthful patriotism and volunteered into the Western Army of Civil War.

== Civil War service ==
=== Overview ===
Edward Lyon Buchwalter, at the age of 21, left college early and voluntarily enlisted into Western Army or the Union Army of American Civil War on August 15, 1862, as a sergeant and he mustered into Co. A, 114th Ohio Infantry on September 8, 1862. He was assigned to the 3rd Mississippi Volunteers on July 12, 1863. On July 25, 1863, transferred out commissioned as 1st Lieutenant of Co. H., 53rd U.S. Colored Infantry. He was promoted to Captain on June 22, 1864. On March 8, 1866, following the end of the war, Buchwalter mustered out with an honorable discharge and became head of the Bureau of Refugees, Freedmen and Abandoned Lands of eight eastern counties in Mississippi for approximately six months.

=== As rank of sergeant ===
In August 1862, Edward Lyon Buchwalter, was promoted a sergeant in Company A, 114th Ohio Infantry and led forces in the Vicksburg Campaign. His first engagement, he took part under Union Major General William T. Sherman to forward through the swamps toward the Walnut Hills (Confederate front of the Northern forts of Vicksburg, Mississippi) later known as the Battle of Chickasaw Bayou (Dec.26-29, 1862). The Confederates won the battle and Buchwalter was one among 1,005 men wounded. Thereafter he participated in a spirited engagement at Fort Hindman, Arkansas, Battle of Fort Hindman (Jan.9-11, 1863) aka, Battle of Arkansas Post.

He was actively identified with the continuous military movement of the Union forces commanded by Maj. General Ulysses S. Grant leading up to the subjugation of the so-called "Gibraltar of the West." On July 4, 1863, he assisted in the digging of the historic canal designed to isolate Vicksburg, and in the command of the division of U.S. Army General Peter Joseph Osterhaus, and of the corps of Union General John Alexander McClernand, he aided in the building of pontoon bridges.

=== His Engagement in the Vicksburg Campaign of U.S Civil War ===
Edward Lyon Buchwalter took part in the engagements between Union and Confederate forces during the Vicksburg Campaign at the Battle of Thompson's Hill, the Battle of Port Gibson (May 1, 1863, near Port Gibson, Miss.), Battle of Raymond (May 12, 1863, near Raymond, Miss.), Battle of Champion Hill (May 15, 1863, on Barker's Creek, Hinds Co., Miss.), Battle of Big Black River Bridge (May 17, 1863, Hinds County, Miss) and the assaults at the Battle of Vicksburg (at Vicksburg, Mississippi), and thus had his full share of intensive warfare. Vicksburg was the site of the Siege of Vicksburg (May 18 – July 4, 1863), an important battle in which the Union forces gained control of the entire Mississippi River. The battle consisted of a long siege, which was necessary because the town was on high ground, well fortified, and difficult to attack directly. The capture of Vicksburg and the simultaneous defeat of General Robert E. Lee at Gettysburg marked the turning point in the Civil War.

Buchwalter's executive ability and soldierly qualities led to his being commissioned first lieutenant in the 53rd United States Mississippi Colored Infantry Volunteers on July 25, 1863. Following the Union victory of Vicksburg, Buckwalter's company and regiment located to Goodrich Landing where Battle of Goodrich's Landing (June 29 and June 30, 1863), between Union and Confederate forces. The Confederates attacked several Union Black Regiments that were protecting several captured plantations. Though the Confederates were able to destroy a number of plantations, the attacks did little real damage to the Union war effort in the region. Next, they were ordered to Milliken's Bend, Louisiana Battle of Milliken's Bend (June 7, 1863) and stationed till January 1864 when they were ordered back to Vicksburg.

=== 53rd Mississippi (Colored) Infantry ===
==== Servicemen ====
Dr. B.S. Chase (died 1878) was surgeon, formerly assistant surgeon of the 14th O.V.I.

=== Rank of Captain ===
He was promoted to captain on June 22, 1864. From Vicksburg, during the month of October 1864, he led union forces up and along White River, a tributary of the Mississippi River, to St. Charles, Arkansas. While on this journey they were many times under fire. In the spring of 1865 Captain Buchwalter returned to Vicksburg, whence he was sent to Jackson, Mississippi.

He was mustered out of service on March 8, 1866, and received an honorable discharge. Later accounts indicate that he viewed his military service positively and expressed respect for former adversaries on both sides of the American Civil War. His continued interest in his old comrades in arms has been vitalized by his appreciative affiliation with the Grand Army of the Republic and the military order known as the Loyal Legion. He was Commander of Ohio Commandery of the Military Order of the Loyal Legion of the United States (MOLLUS).

=== His Sword ===
Upon achieving the rank of Lieutenant, Mr. Buchwalter was presented a sword that carried throughout the war and inscribed on it:

"Presented to Lieu.' Edward L. Buchwalter/3rd Miss. Colored Vols./by his Mother".

These swords were imported by military outfitters like Schuyler, Hartley & Graham of New York, who sold them to officers who were required to furnish their own artillery, uniforms and equipment.

Capt. E.L. Buchwalter's sword was a non-regulation US officer's sword known as the Peterson 75, due to its inclusion as figure 75 in Harold Peterson's seminal work The American Sword 1775–1945. This class of swords is typically an iron-mounted officer's sword and is invariably a sword imported from the Prussian cutlery center at Solingen with a maker's mark "W. Walscheid" (Wilhelm Walscheid) of Solingen, Prussia, who made a limited number of swords exclusively for export to the American market during the American Civil War and went out of business immediately after the war.

His sword was marked W. WALSHEID/SOLINGEN in two lines on side of the longer than standard ricasso, and had a small brass disk impressed on the other side of the ricasso that read in an arc "PROVED". The blade featured a panoply of arms with a spread-winged eagle, along with a banner reading E PLURIBUS UNUM and embellished with etched floral and patriotic banners and motifs such as a drum on one side of the blade. The other side featured a similar foliate banner, with a large U.S. in the center. The wooden grip was wrapped with sharkskin and secured with seven turns of gilded copper wire that has a twisted center strand and two single flanking strands. The pierced iron guard featured the usual spread winged eagle with E PLURIBUS UNUM above it and "U S" below.

== His marital life and residence ==
Capt. E.L. Buchwalter married Clementine Cordelia Berry (1843–1912) on Sept 1, 1868. In 1893, he purchased a home at 359 East High Street, Springfield, Ohio from the Charles Clark estate. Built in 1852 and situated just moments from downtown, it is one of the oldest homes in Springfield. Clementine Berry Buchwalter provided hospitality for decades of club parties originated by women from all over the United States. She opened her residence to the local women for gatherings. Out of this grew the foundation of the Ohio Federation of Women's Clubs.

In 1908 the city renumbered East High Street and the Buchwalter home became 805 East High Street. Today the mansion is home of the Woman's Town Club of Springfield, Ohio. Founded in 1922, the Woman's Town Club provides a social center for women in the Springfield community and maintains and preserves this historic home.

=== Clementine Berry Buchwalter, his first wife. ===
Clementine Cordelia Berry M.L.A. (Master of Liberal Arts), the eldest of the family of seven of Rev. John A. Berry and his wife, Eleanora Evelyn Andrews, was born in Danville, Ohio, February 8, 1843; died in Dansville, N.Y., November 1912. She graduated from the Ohio Wesleyan Female College, at Delaware, Ohio, the summer of 1862, a classmate of Mary Wood, now the celebrated Dr. Mary Wood-Allen. From 1864 to 1865, Berry taught in Public Schools in Columbus, Ohio and Granville Female College, in Granville, Ohio from 1865 to 1866. She taught Latin and French in the Illinois Female College, at Quincy, and the Indiana State Female College, at Indianapolis. She was vice-president of the Board of Lady Managers of the St. Louis Exposition in 1904 (Louisiana Purchase Exposition), and President Francis telegraphed her husband she was the Mark Hanna of the Board. She was a charter member of the General Federation of Women's Clubs, of which she was made honorary vice-president for life. She was vice-president of the Pioneers of the General Federation. She organized the Ohio Federation of Women's Clubs, of which she was made honorary president for life, and her name is in the Founders' Roll of the General Federation of Women's Clubs.

The summer of last year of her life and the 50th anniversary of her class, she attended the commencement at Delaware as guest of honor and delivered the diplomas to the class of 1912. At the time of her death in 1912, the Ohio Federation decided at a memorial service held in Springfield to establish the Clementine Berry Buchwalter Fund, and at the next annual meeting at Chillicothe, Ohio, Capt. Edward L. Buchwalter was present and wrote the president that he would provide an endowment fund of $10,000 in memory of his wife, Clementine Berry Buchwalter, the annual net income to be used in such a way as the directors might desire. If the clubs decided to do this, for every $400 they raised he would give $100, up to the amount of $10,000, not including the $5,000 first given by him. The club women consulted him as to whether he preferred a scholarship or a fund to be used in the club work, but as no one knew better than he how much money was needed to carry on the Federation work, he advised an endowment fund like the one to her dearest friend, Sarah Piatt Decker. In October 1915, the sum had reached $10,000, $6,000 of which had been contributed by Captain Buchwalter.

=== Marilla Andrews, his second wife ===
In March 1914, widower Capt. Edward Lyon Buchwalter wedded Miss Marilla Andrews. She was one of five siblings of John Cain Andrews and Sarah Wright (daughter of William Wright and Grace Hollows) and cousin to the late Clemenine Berry Buchwalter. Marilla grew up in Evansville, Wisconsin and attended the Evansville Seminary, graduating class in 1884. Then graduated from the University of Wisconsin in Madison, Wisconsin receiving a B.A. in English. Two years after she graduated, Marilla opened Evansville's first pre-school in the family home. It was called an "infant school". Marilla Andrews was best known as the first woman editor of a newspaper in Evansville, The Badger. Marilla went to college several years after she had graduated from the Evansville Seminary. She graduated from the University of Wisconsin in June 1892 and moved to live with her brother Byron Andrews in New York, where he had charge (business manager) of the offices of the National Tribune and American Farmer in that city. With his assistance, Marilla became a reporter for the National Tribune. Two years later, when she returned to her home in Evansville, she had al-ready made up her mind to publish her own newspaper. The offices were located in the "Pioneer Block", at what is now 8 South Madison Street. With the introduction of The Badger, Evansville had four weekly papers, including the Evansville Review, and Caleb Libby's The Enterprise and The Tribune.

The Badger was devoted to local and national news and carried a full page of Evansville advertising and news. Marilla was a load voice for women's rights. She also advocated a city form of government for Evansville, a public water works and sewer system. She wrote of the need for a public library with a reading room and reference department, supported by local taxes.

Like her brother, Byron, she supported President William McKinley for president in 1896. "The Republican party is mindful of the rights and interests of women. Protection of American industries includes equal opportunities, equal pay for equal work and protection to the home," she wrote in one of her editorials supporting the presidential candidate. It would be more than 20 years before her dream of the right to vote became a reality.

Her support of local projects was not always in line with the views of the voters. When the local school became crowded in the late 1890s, she became a champion for neighborhood schools for the youngest children. Marilla taught sixth and seventh grade in the Evansville schools in the late 1890s and also served as grade school principal in 1897. This was accomplished while she also edited her newspaper and occasionally acting as City Clerk in the absence of the regular clerk.

Marilla was very concerned about the education of Evansville's youth. To overcome the crowded conditions, she offered the suggestion in her news-paper that a school be placed on East Main Street and another on West Main Street, thus freeing up the available school class rooms for the inter-mediate and high school students. However, a proposal to build a new high school won the citizens favor.

In 1894, Marilla helped to form the Women's Literary Club. The first meeting was held at the Andrews' home in Evansville in October 1894. Marilla was voted vice-president of the new organization.

Marilla also became editor of a Wisconsin newspaper devoted to the right of women to vote called The Citizen. Marilla also helped to bring focus on Evansville by helping to bring statewide suffrage meetings to the city, including many nationally known speakers. As a business owner, Marilla joined other Evansville women in promoting industrial growth and civic projects. Following her sister, Eleanora's terms as post master, Marilla was appointed By President Grover Cleveland as post master of Evansville.

== His career ==
=== Overview ===
Captain Edward L. Buchwalter, a veteran of the Civil War, return to Hallsville, Ohio, continued to work on the family farming. In 1872, he and his wife moved to Springfield, Ohio where he join the Industrial Era and became president of the Superior Drill Company (later the American Seeding Machine Company) and president of the Citizens' National Bank.

=== Government official ===
After the war came to a close he continued in the service of the Government, first as Provost Marshal at Macon, Mississippi, and later in similar service at Meridian, Mississippi, where he had charge also of the Freedmen's Bureau.

=== Corporate endeavors ===
==== Superior Drill Company ====
Buchwalter was one of the organizers of the Superior Drill Company and president of the same, 1883–1903. In 1903 the company merged into American Seeding Machine Co.

==== American Seeding Machine Company ====
Buchwalter was president of the American Seeding Machine Co. from 1903 to 1911.

=== Banking industry ===
==== The Citizens National Bank of Springfield, Ohio ====
Buchwalter was one of the organizers of the Citizens National Bank of Springfield. Ohio in 1898. He was president from 1898 to 1917 or later.

== Membership of civil and private organizations ==
- George Washington Memorial Association Joined-1914
- Grand Army of the Republic (G. A. R). He was mustered into the Mitchell Post No.45 in Springfield, Ohio on April 1, 1887, under the commander Col. James E. Stewart.
- Military Order of the Loyal Legion of the United States. He was Commander of Ohio Commandery, also known by its acronym MOLLUS.
- Springfield Country Club
- Lagonda Club in Springfield, Ohio.
- Warder Public Library. Springfield, Ohio. Member and Board of Trustees from 1878 to 1917 or later.

== Death ==
Capt. Edward Lyon Buchwalter died in 1933. Served under Gen. Sherman and Gen. Grant. President of Citizen's National Bank and Superior Drill Co. He is buried at the historic Ferncliff Cemetery & Arboretum, Springfield, Ohio. Ohio's largest historic cemetery.
