= Harry Falkenau =

19th-century classical composers

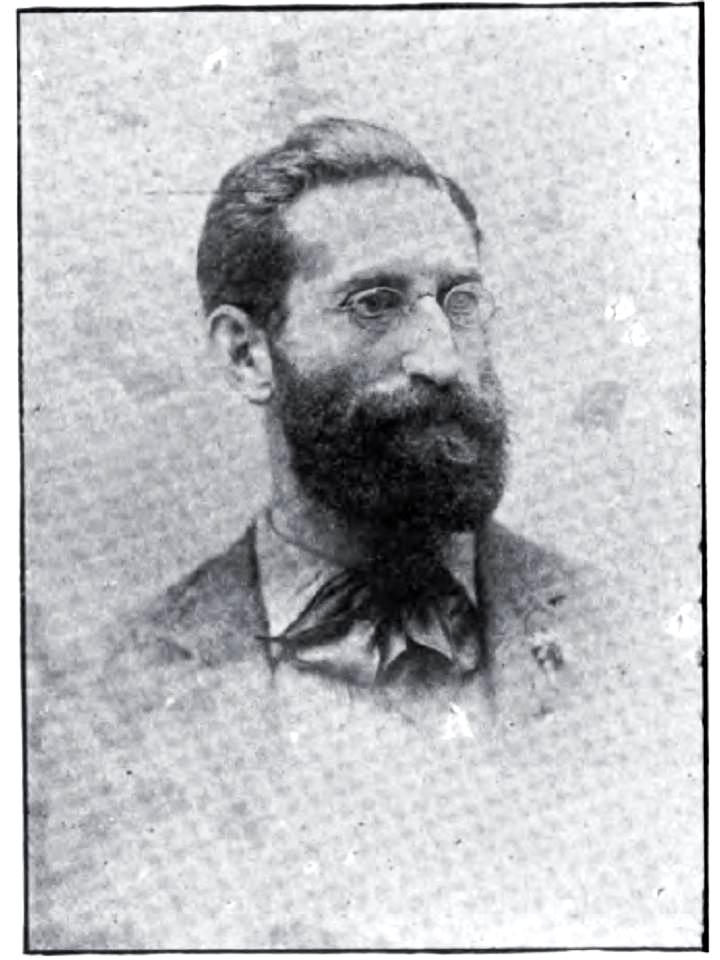
Music critic, Harry Falkenau (1892).

Henry Falkenau (January 14, 1864 – January 1, 1907) of Chicago, Illinois was a musician, music critic and bibliophile who operated an antique book shop at 167 Madison Street, Chicago, Illinois specializing in Americana, first editions, as well as metaphysics. He was also an early defender of Walt Whitman's poetry, taking a First Amendment stand against censorship soon after Leaves of Grass was declared obscene in 1882.

== Defense of Leaves of Grass ==
As a junior at Cornell University, Falkenau joined the national debate against censorship of Walter Whitman's poem, Leaves of Grass. Falkenau protested the text's banning from the Chicago Public Library. Harry Falkenau's argument for Leaves of Grass' inclusion was that the allegedly "unclean" in Whitman's work was an interpretation in the mind of the reader and not a characteristic intrinsic to the text. Notably, that the "salacious dithyrambics" were obscene only when read by an unclean mind, which was not a reason to deny access to the text by clean minds. Falkenau's defense occurred after United States Postmaster Anthony Comstock declared Whitman's work obscene under federal law. The editors of Chicago's The Current responded to Falkenau's free speech protest, focusing on his "species of false logic ... that is, if certain indecencies have crept into the libraries of all scholars and maintained an obscure footing there, then the doors of every man's bookcase should open for whatever mistake or eccentric author may see fit to publish. It is not the business of a public institution to teach Mr. Whitman's ideas of art."

== Cornell studies ==
Falkenau took his Bachelor of Arts from Cornell University in 1885 and remained at the university in as a Fellow in Literature for an additional year, 1886. At the beginning of AY1885-1886, Falkenau became Chimesmaster of Cornell University, responsible for the operation of the University's chimes then housed in the cupola atop McGraw Hall. He substituted on the chimes as early as 1881, and held the position of Chimesmaster until 1888. Falkenau was also an Assistant Librarian during his last year at Cornell. During the winter of his senior year (1885), he competed for the university's Woodford Oration prize, giving his oration on "The Growth of Religious Toleration in the United States." One of the judges for that year's Woodford Oration was William Gardner Hale. Falkenau was also among selected speakers at the Cornell University commencement on May 22, 1885. Addressing the Faculty and sixty-one graduates, he delivered his oration on "The Poetry of the Future as Foreshadowed in the Writings of Walt Whitman."

As an upperclassman, Falkenau was active in the Irving Literary Society. The Society had, by 1884, dropped its initial bar against women and freely admitted Cornell's Jewish students. Though literature and oration were important aspects of Falkenau's studies, music was his passion. As a member of the Irving Literary Society, he was provided a venue for regular musical play. The Society was then in its fifteenth year of operation, and the following report of its May Day celebration, 1884, shows the manner in which various arts were integrated in this Cornell forum:

The May Day meeting of the Irving last Friday evening, was most highly enjoyable to the goodly number, who were fortunate enough to be present. The room had been tastefully decorated with evergreens, during the afternoon, and the ladies of the society had provided flowers for the members and visitors. The first part of the evening was devoted to the literary exercises. Both the "May Day History", by Mr. Ayres, and the "May Day Story," by Miss C. Smith, were listened to with pleasure, and were roundly applauded at the close. But on the whole, the most enjoyable exercise, in this part of the programme, was the "Spring Poem", by Mr. Thurber. Abounding in sharp local "hits," the poem met the heartiest approval. Mr. Thurber was awarded the bouquet of the evening. After a pleasant recess, which, perhaps, was somewhat too long, Mr. Falkenau was announced for an "optional". At his request the lights were turned down, when he rendered Chopin's "Nocturno", with unusual effectiveness. The favorable impression produced by Mr. Falkenau's first rendering, was not at all lessened by the two encores which he gave. On the whole, the Irving's "May Day" exercises were a decided success.

An example of the manner in which Falkenau's oratory was integrated with other arts at Cornell University was the Irving Literary Society's programme of April 1885. One member presented a paper; then Harry Falkenau read an original essay; then a Miss Dearstyne performed an optional prior to the main presentation, a debate on the question, "Resolved that the fifteen hour rule should be enforced." (Chauncey Bickford, in the negative.) In March 1885, Falkenau took the affirmative in the Irving debate, "Resolved, that the public educational system is not limited to the social and intellectual development of the people." During Falkenau's year as a Fellow in Literature, he was well enough regarded to teach Professor Hiram Corson's courses on Geoffrey Chaucer, Anglo-Saxon Literature, and William Shakespeare, in the latter's absence. Falkenau also provided violin music for Professor Corson's social soirees at his home in Collegetown, adjacent to Cornell's campus.

Harry Falkenau's brothers Arthur, Cornell class of 1878 and Louis, Cornell class of 1873, attended the university and took their degrees as civil engineers. Harry Falkenau listed Marc Eidlitz as a point of contact for the University and, perhaps, as "guardian." Two of Eidlitz's sons, Otto and Robert attended Cornell and were among the earliest Jewish students attending the University. There are a few discrepancies in the record. According to the 1888 Cornell Alumni Directory, Falkenau attended the College of the City of New York from 1880 to 1881, before entering Cornell, and then moving on to Johns Hopkins University in 1887, living at 1016 McCullogh Street, Baltimore, Maryland. In 1888, brothers, Harry and Louis, returned to the family home on Madeira Island. The 1888 Directory also confirms that Falkenau was a "Fellow in English Literature" at Cornell in 1885-1886.

== Musical Career, Performer & Critic ==
While still an undergraduate, Falkenau composed original works of college airs and a set of waltzes he named the "Kismet". These were performed at the Wilgus Opera House in Ithaca, New York. He was proficient with both the violin and pianoforte. His campus appearances included, for instance, his violin performance of Mozart's Sonata No. 5. and Beethoven's Sonata F, major. Falkenau also performed before the Young Men's Christian Association (YMCA) and provide support for the university's amateur dramatic club, Falkenau then spent the summer of 1883 working with Herman Brant, a renowned Chicago violinist. Prior to settling in Chicago permanently, Falkenau received accolades in San Francisco (1890), when art patron August Hinrichs, proprietor of the Baldwin Theatre, awarded him a prize for the gavotte, op. 2, Roses, Music and Love (1891). He was also associated with the composer Xaver Scharwenka in the early 1890s. Franz Xaver Scharwenka (1850–1924) was a German pianist, composer, and founder a music school in New York City. Scharwenka also organised concert series. The next year (1892), Falkenau moved to Chicago to take a position as music critical for the Chicago Herald. Falkenau was appointed to the Herald as the Tribune approached a near-decade of declining eminence in musicology. The Herald moved into the Tribune former position by devoting liberal attention to music. Falkenau was described as having ". . .a certain force of his own, and is not slow to recognize novelties at their proper value, as the columns of the Herald often show. Holding and expressing distinct opinions, in so prominent a place as that afforded by a prosperous daily. Mr. Falkenau makes quiet a number of enemies. His scalp is therefore in lively demand, and some day a smart enemy may get it. But there is one comfort in this sort of thing: The fellow whose torn skin is beginning to heal always joins in the laugh at the latest victim, so that there is room to hope that the mills of gods may grind so slowly in this case as to afford the ambitious critic time for showing the essential soundness and reliability of his work."

== Antiquarian ==
Falkenau then opened a bookstore dealing in rare tomes, 167 Madison Street. This was the second shop, the first being at 46 Madison Street, between Wabash and State. Two years before his death in 1907, Harry was featured in a satire of the rare book vending community of the Middle West, "Falkenau, by Harry! they used to call him 'Stone', if a book in Lowndes appears, to Harry its 'unknown'. The publication referred to by "A.N. Oldfool" was The Bibliographer's Manual of English by William Thomas Lowndes (1864), which was the bookseller's guide to what was available on the market, antique or otherwise. As the title page declares, "an Account of Rare, Curious, and Useful Books Published in or Relating to Great Britain and Ireland, from the Invention of Printing with Bibliographical and Critical Notices, Collations of the Rarer Articles, and the Prices at Which they Have Been Sold."

== Early life and family ==
Falkenau was born in New York City on January 14, 1864. His father, Moritz (Morris) Falkenau is listed in 1881 as living at Funchal, Madeira. His mother Theresa was born in Prague in 1832. At some point, the entire family immigrated from the Madeira Islands. The family is thought to have immigrated from the Austro-Hungarian Empire to Madeira Island after the 1840s. His grandfather was Adalbert (17193-1894), his father Moritz (1825–1882), who brought the family to New York City. In 1893, Falkenau was married to Esther Friend Greenebaum (May 27, 1867 – June 23, 1961) of Chicago, Illinois. Esther was confirmed by Bernhard Felsenthal, Zion Temple in 1881; graduated from West Division High School in 1885. Harry and Esther had two daughters, Ruth (d. 1988) and Bertha. In April 1895, Harry Falkenau, his brothers and his sister sold their family's five story, stone fronted building at 344 50th Street, New York City. Harry, sister Nellie F. (Falkenau) Danziger, and brothers Louis and Victor were listed as "of Chicago". Brother Arthur was a resident of Philadelphia. Harry Falkenau's residences in Chicago were at 1923 Indiana Avenue and, later, 4854 Prairie Avenue.

Falkenau had some relationship with Marc Eidlitz, a major building contractor in New York City. Louis had begun his career in Eidlitz's office, and Arthur married Eidlitz's daughter Emily. Arthur and Louis Falkenau were both College of Engineering alumni, and Arthur went on to teach Mechanical Engineering at Cornell, and may have been the organizing alumnus behind the "Harry Falkenau Teaching Fellowship" currently administered by Cornell's College of Arts & Sciences. Harry himself died in the resort town of Coloma, Michigan on Lake Paw Paw, January 21, 1907. Louis died in Milwaukee in 1921; Arthur in Stamford, Connecticut, and Victor in Los Angeles, California, both in 1933. Both Arthur and Louis were also brothers in Phi Kappa Psi.

== Honors ==
The Cornell University English Department maintains the Harry Falkenau Graduate Teaching Fellowship, which provides one semester of teaching release so that graduate students may develop a freshman seminar based on their dissertation topic. Past Falkenau Fellows include:

- Brigitte Fielder, 2009.
- Brooks Appelbaum,1993.

== Sample Discography ==
- The Chicago Herald, Waltzes for pianoforte by Harry Falkenau (1893).

== Member ==
Falkenau was a member of Cornell's Euterpe Club, which focused on the musical arts. He also joined both the Phi Kappa Psi fraternity and the Irving Literary Society.
