= John Andrew Rea =

American journalist (1848–1941)

- Rea in 1936
- Born: June 18, 1848; Lancaster County, Pennsylvania, U.S.
- Died: February 10, 1941 (aged 92); Tacoma, Washington, U.S.
- Education: AB, Cornell University, 1869
- Occupations: Journalist and politician

John Andrew Rea (June 18, 1848 – February 10, 1941) was an American journalist and politician. A native of Lancaster County, Pennsylvania, he was one of the eight members of Cornell University's first graduating class. As a correspondent for the Chicago Tribune and the New York Herald, he covered the 1877 flight of Chief Joseph and the Nez Perce to Montana and their final battle with the US Army. While living in North Dakota, he covered the Battle of the Little Bighorn and drafted the constitution adopted by North Dakota when it became a state in 1889. From 1889 until his death, Rea lived in Washington state where he was the editor-in-chief of The Olympian and later president of the University of Washington Board of Regents and the first executive director of the Port of Tacoma.

== Early life and education ==
Rea was born in Lancaster County, Pennsylvania, to John Rea and Sarah Ann Robb, on June 18, 1848. He studied for three years at Ohio Wesleyan University. However, when Cornell University opened in 1868, he was attracted by "its promise of liberality in education" and moved there to complete his final year, along with two fellow students at Ohio Wesleyan, Morris Buchwalter and Joseph Foraker. While at Cornell, Rea was a founding member of the Irving Literary Society and the Cornell chapter of Phi Kappa Psi, as well as a member of Phi Beta Kappa.

== Career ==
Following his graduation from Cornell in 1869, he worked as a journalist for the Philadelphia Press. For the next 30 years, journalism was to be his primary profession. In 1873, he married the former Mary Terry of Ithaca, New York, and the couple moved to Nebraska. He worked as a reporter in both Lincoln and Omaha, where among other stories, he covered the Nebraska Constitutional Convention of 1875.

He later became managing editor of the Minneapolis Tribune, editor of the Bismarck Tribune and editor of the Dakota edition of the St. Paul Pioneer Press, for whom he had covered the Battle of the Little Bighorn As a correspondent for the Chicago Tribune and the New York Herald, he singlehandedly covered the 1877 flight of Chief Joseph and the Nez Perce to Montana and their final battle with the US Army. While Rea was living in Bismarck, he was also for a time the Register of the United States Land Office there. In 1889 he organized the North Dakota state constitutional convention, serving as its secretary and helping to draft the state's constitution.

In late 1889, Rea moved to Washington state where he became the editor-in-chief of The Olympian, which had recently changed from a weekly to a daily newspaper. During his time in Olympia, he became an advisor and close friend of Elisha P. Ferry, Washington's first governor when it achieved statehood in 1889. In the late 1890s, Rea and his family settled in Tacoma where he developed timber and real estate businesses and became the first executive director of the Port of Tacoma, a post which he held until 1921. Rea also sat on the Board of Regents for the University of Washington and served for a time as the board's president. Described as one of Tacoma's most colorful characters and an astute Republican politician, US Presidents from Grover Cleveland to Franklin Delano Roosevelt referred to him as "Mr. Tacoma".

== Death ==
On February 10, 1941, Rea died at his home in Tacoma, Washington. At the time of his death, he was the oldest surviving alumnus of Cornell University and the last surviving member of Cornell's first graduating class.

== Sources ==
- Copp, Henry Norris, The American settler's guide: a popular exposition of the public land system of the United States of America, 1886 (accessed 16 May 2010)
- Cornell Alumni News, "Oldest Alumnus Dies", Vol. 43 No. 19, 27 February 1941, p. 262 (accessed 16 May 2010)
- Lounsberry, Clement A., Early history of North Dakota, Liberty Press, 1919 (accessed 16 May 2010)
- Magden, Ronald "Port Leadership – Past to Present – Envision Tacoma's Future", Journal of Commerce, 3 November 2008, p. 6 (accessed 16 May 2010)
- Nebraska State Historical Society, Nebraska History and Record of Pioneer Days, Vol. IV, No. 1, January–March 1921 (accessed 16 May 2010)
- New York Times, "John Rea, Ex-Editor, Cornell Alumnus", 21 February 1941
- The Register-Guard, "Covering Indian Wars Was No Joke, Old Time Reporter Recalls", 15 March 1936, p. 3 (accessed 16 May 2010)
- Prosser, William Farrand, A history of the Puget Sound country, its resources, its commerce and its people, Lewis Publishing Co, 1903, p. 463 (accessed 16 May 2010)
- Tacoma Public Library Image Archives, John A. Rea, Image 3381 (accessed 16 May 2010)
