= Harris J. Ryan =

American electrical engineer

- Born: January 8, 1866
- Died: July 3, 1934 (aged 68)
- Education: Cornell University
- Awards: IEEE Edison Medal (1925)
- Scientific career
- Academic advisors: William A. Anthony

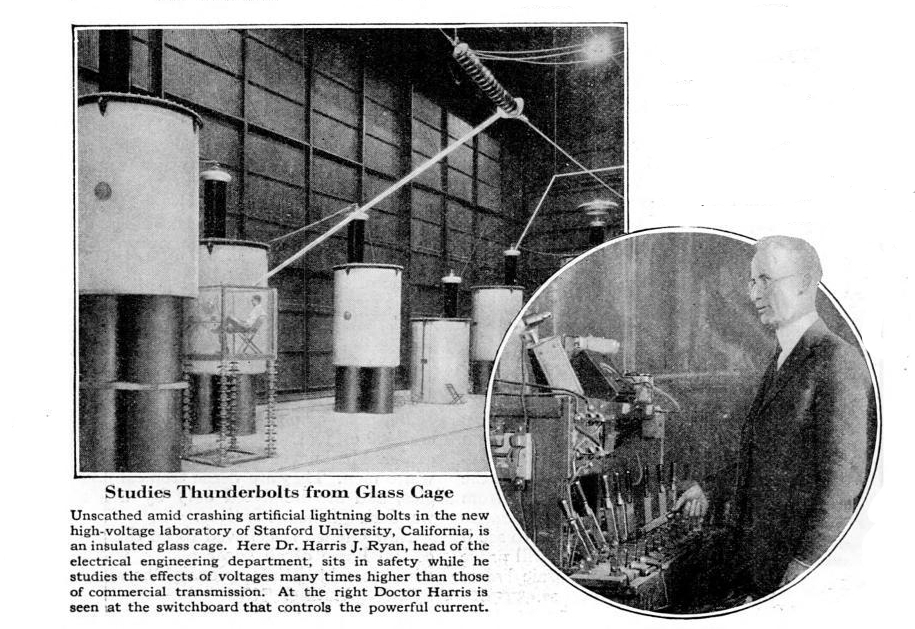
Ryan studying high-voltage electricity in 1929

Harris J. Ryan (January 8, 1866 – July 3, 1934) was an American electrical engineer and a professor first at Cornell University and later at Stanford University. Ryan is known for his significant contributions to high voltage power transmission, for which he received the IEEE Edison Medal. Ryan was elected to the National Academy of Science in 1920 and served as president of the AIEE during 1923-1924.

Ryan was a member of Sigma Xi, Phi Kappa Psi, and the Irving Literary Society.
