= Francis Whiting Halsey =

American journalist, editor, and historian

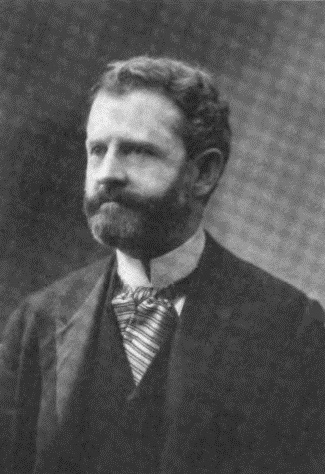
Francis W. Halsey.

Francis Whiting Halsey (October 15, 1851 – November 24, 1919) was an American journalist, editor and historian, born in Unadilla, New York. He was the son of Dr. Gaius Leonard Halsey, a Civil War surgeon, and Juliet (Cartington) Halsey. He was the grandson of Dr. Gaius and Mary (Church) Halsey of Kortright, New York, and a descendant of Thomas Halsey, who emigrated from England before 1640 and helped to found the settlement of Southampton, Long Island, one of the earliest English settlements in New York.

== Biography ==
Francis Halsey prepared for college at the Unadilla academy and graduated from Cornell University in 1873, taking one of the prizes for an essay in English literature. He was assistant editor of the Binghamton Times (1873–1875), a member of the editorial staff of the New York Tribune (1875–1880), and in 1880 joined the staff of The New York Times as foreign editor and writer of book reviews. He was literary editor of the Times from 1892 through 1896, and became the first editor of the Times Saturday Review of Books and Art in 1896. In 1902, he left the Review to become a literary advisor to D. Appleton & Company. Subsequently, he joined Funk and Wagnalls in the same capacity, remaining with that publisher until his death.

Halsey was a prolific author and editor. His original works included travel writing (Two Months Abroad, collecting his reportage for the Tribune on the Paris World's Fair (1878)), New York State history (The Old New York Frontier (1901), The Pioneers of Unadilla Village, 1784-1840 (1902), and a number of articles), literary criticism (Our Literary Deluge And Some of Its Deeper Waters (1902)) and family history (extended introduction to Thomas Halsey of Hertfordshire, England and Southampton, Long Island (1895)).

As a compiler and editor, he assembled several enormous collections of, inter alia, famous speeches, prose literary works, travel narratives and writings about American history. (See the list of works infra.) His major achievement was the ten-volume Literary Digest History of the World War, consisting largely of skillfully collated and rewritten newspaper accounts and official documents, enhanced by a plethora of photographs. Publication began within a year after the conclusion of the conflict. While the work obviously is a "first draft of history", it is a good one that can be read with profit even today. The author did not, however, live to see it to completion. He died while at work on the final volume.

Active in the affairs of his alma mater, he was elected president of the New York association of Cornell alumni in 1882 and was twice the candidate of New York and other alumni for trustee of Cornell in 1882 and 1883, during the alumni agitation for new methods in university management. He was elected a member of the Aldine and Cornell clubs in New York. He lectured on early American history and made addresses before the New York Historical Society, the New York library club and the Wyoming, Pennsylvania Commemorative Association.

In 1883, he married Virginia Isabel, daughter of Alexander Stanton and Sarah Ann Forbes of New York City. She died in January 1899. In her memory, he published, anonymously, Virginia Isabel Forbes the year after her death. He did not remarry.

Halsey's brother, Frederick Arthur Halsey, graduated from Cornell in 1878 with a degree in mechanical engineering, authored articles and books about engineering, with an emphasis the metric system, and was editor of the American Machinist. Frederick's daughters were Marion S. and Olga S. Halsey.

== Works ==
- Two Months Abroad (1878)
- An introduction to Thomas Halsey of Hertfordshire, England, and Southampton, Long Island, 1591-1679, with his American Descendents to the Eighth and Ninth Generations, by Jacob LaFayette Halsey and Edmund Drake Halsey (1895)
- Virginia Isabel Forbes (1900), a memoir of his wife
- The Old New York Frontier: Its Wars with Indians and Tories, its Missionary Schools, Pioneers and Land Titles, 1614-1800, Charles Scribner's Sons, New York, 1901
- American Authors And Their Homes, Personal Descriptions And Interviews, J. Pott & Company, New York (1901)
- The Pioneers of Unadilla Village, 1784-1840 (1902)
- Our Literary Deluge And Some of Its Deeper Waters (1902)
- The World's Famous Orations (with William Jennings Bryan) (ed., 10 volumes, 1906)
- The Best of the World's Classics, Restricted to Prose (with Senator Henry Cabot Lodge) (ed., 10 volumes, 1909)
- Great Epochs in American History, Described by Famous Writers, From Columbus to Roosevelt (ed., 10 volumes, 1912)
- Works by Francis Whiting Halsey at Project Gutenberg
  - Seeing Europe with Famous Authors (Project Gutenberg) (ed., 10 volumes, 1914)
- The Literary Digest History of the World War, compiled from Original and Contemporary Sources: American, British, French, German, and Others (10 Volumes, 1919–20)

== Sources ==
- James H. Pickering (Michigan State University), New York in the Revolution: Cooper's Wyandotté, Published in New York History, Vol. XLIX, No. 2 (April 1968), pp. 121-141
- Guide to the Halsey Family Papers, 1870-1975, Division of Rare and Manuscript Collections, Cornell University Library
- The Twentieth Century Biographical Dictionary of Notable Americans, Volume 5. The Biographical Society, Boston, 1904
- "F.H.V", Introduction to The Literary Digest History of the World War, Volume 10 (1920)
