= Morris Lyon Buchwalter =

American judge (1846–1924)

Hon. Morris Lyon Buchwalter

Personal details
- Born: September 8, 1846 Hallsville, Ohio
- Died: March 12, 1924 (aged 77) Cincinnati, Ohio
- Resting place: Spring Grove Cemetery, Cincinnati, Ohio
- Party: Republican
- Spouse: Louise Zimmerman (m. 1873; died 1902)
- Relations: Edward Lyon Buchwalter (brother)
- Children: 6
- Education: Ohio Wesleyan University; Cornell University; Cincinnati Law School
- Profession: Judge

Morris Lyon Buchwalter (September 8, 1846 – March 12, 1924) was a radical Ohio Republican jurist of the post-Civil War era whose jurisprudence set a progressive standard following the failure of Reconstruction and during the rise in management/labor tensions in the Gilded Age.

== Early life ==
Morris Lyon Buchwalter was born on September 8, 1846, and raised on the Buchwalter farmstead in Hallsville, Ross County, Ohio. He was the son of Levi and Margeret (née Lyon) Buchwalter, and the younger brother of Capt. Luther Morris Buchwalter and Capt. Edward Lyon Buchwalter, both Union Army officers of the American Civil War.

Buchwalter received his early education in the district schools of Ross county, then became a student of the Ohio Wesleyan University at Delaware, Ohio. His brother Luther was the impetus for joining the Phi Kappa Psi fraternity at Ohio Wesleyan University in 1864.

In 1869, Buchwalter transferred to the new Cornell University, graduating with an A.B. in 1869. This was the first graduating class from Cornell. While at Cornell, he became a founder of the New York Alpha chapter of Phi Kappa Psi. He was also the second president of the Irving Literary Society and waselected to Phi Beta Kappa Society. His roommate with future Ohio Senator, Joseph Benson Foraker, who served with Buchwalter's brother in the Tennessee campaign.

Immediately after receiving his diploma, he moved to Cincinnati and entered the Cincinnati Law School, from which he graduated in 1870 with the degree of LL.B.

This section incorporates text from the entry "Morris Lyon Buchwalter" in Cincinnati, the Queen City, 1788-1912, Volume 4, (S. J. Clarke Publishing Company, 1912) a publication now in the public domain.

== Career ==
Buchwlater began general practice in Cincinnati and gained recognition as an energetic, reliable and progressive young lawyer. As the years passed, he gained a prominent position at the bar. On November 4, 1881, he was appointed by Governor Charles Foster, judge of the common-pleas court of the first judicial district of Ohio to fill a vacancy caused by the election of Judge Nicholas Longworth to the Supreme Court of Ohio. He, having been regularly elected for the full term in that court and subsequently reelected for a second and third term, and having also been endorsed by the vote of the bar of Hamilton county during three judicial elections, his judicial service ended February, 1897. Buchwalter was thought to be a highly impartial jurist, and his decisions ranked among the clearest expositions of law enunciated from the common pleas bench in the 19th century.

This section incorporates text from the entry "Morris Lyon Buchwalter" in Cincinnati, the Queen City, 1788-1912, Volume 4, (S. J. Clarke Publishing Company, 1912) a publication now in the public domain.

An example of Buchwalter's labour jurisprudence is N. & C.G. Parker v. Bricklayers' Union No. 1. The action was brought by members of a contractors' union against a bricklayers' union and its various members and officers active in the controversy. The issue at hand was the lawfulness of 'boycotting'. Judge Buchwalter charged the jury that contractors:

may combine for the honest purpose of benefitting their order by encouraging favorable terms to their employers in the purchase of material, and to procure contracts for such contractors as employ members of their union; but they become engaged in illegal enterprise whenever they agree to accomplish their purpose by threats, intimidation, violence or like molestation, either toward the apprentice, the expelled member, the non-union workman, the contractor and the employer, the material man or the owner who proposes to make a contract."

In 1885, the Judge heard a case involving the menace of roller coasters:

Now that a "roller coaster" is ready to be launched upon the local public at Savin Rock, it is interesting to learn from the Boston Herald that Judge Buchwalter of Cincinnati, has been occupied an entire day with the hearing of testimony in a complaint case against one of them. Henry A. Morill and a number of other property owners and residents in the vicinity of the Bellevue house, in Cincinnati, are the plaintiffs, and David Billigheimer the defendant. The plaintiffs allege that the "roller coaster" or circular gravity railway, recently constructed on the Bellevue house grounds, is a nuisance to the neighborhood, on account of the noise it produces; that it prevents sleep, tortures invalids and nervous people, interrupts conversations, and will depreciate the value of property in that vicinity unless its further operation is enjoined, which the plaintiffs pray the court may be done by a perpetual injunction.

But it was in the area of civil liberties that Buchwalter stepped out in front of his peers. In the extradition proceeding regarding the Reverend A. Hampton, an African-American accused of murder, Buchwalter refused extradition to authorities from the Commonwealth of Kentucky until he had assurances from Governor Brown and the Sheriff of Green County, Kentucky, that Hampton would be protected from mob violence. Vigilantes had recently lynched a black man and a black boy in Green County. Buchwalter had also extradited two men, one to George and the other to Kentucky, only to receive reports that mobs killed both. This was not solely due to Southern intolerance for African-Americans. The Kentucky case involved an Italian-American. Buchwalter's order from the bench included an admonishment against vigilante justice on the other side of the Ohio river: "I determined then I would never send another prisoner South unless I had assurance he would be protected from a mob and given a fair trial." It was thought for a while in 1895 that the position of Buchwalter would lead to an intrastate solution to the growing problem of lynching, forcing violent States such as Kentucky to use the good offices of States known for order and pacificity, such as Illinois and Pennsylvania. The trend did not abate, and the matter was taken up by the Federal government only in the 1960s. The reaction in Cincinnati was more direct. A chapter of the Anti-Lynching League of the United States was formed in the Queen City in response to Buchwalter's opinion.

== Personal life ==
On May 14, 1873, Buchwalter married Louise Zimmerman, a daughter of the Honorable John Zimmerman, of Wooster, Ohio. She died in 1902, leaving six children, including: Luther L., who engaged in the manufacturing business at Springfield, Ohio; Robert Z., an attorney of Cincinnati; Margaret L., the wife of Dr. H. B. Martin, of Springfield; Helen E., the wife of John Van Nortwick, of Batavia, Illinois; Morris, who resided at Hallsville, Ohio; and Louise, who married H. Cameron Forster, of Middletown, Ohio.

On July 22, 1909, Buchwalter married Mary F. Knox of Lakewood, New Jersey. She formerly the registrar of Smith College and was a daughter of Rev. Charles E. Knox, former president of the German Theological Seminary, of Newark, New Jersey.

Politically, Buchwalter identified with the Republican Party, being a bridge figure between the abolition movement and the Progressive Era. He wrote an extensive study of Free Masonry and belonged to the Scottish Rite, being a thirty-third degree member of the order having been elected as such in 1894. He served as trustee for the University of Cincinnati. He was also the first president of the Cornell Alumni Association and Class Secretary, Class of 1869, for many years. He held membership in the Loyal Legion of Ohio.

Buchwalter died on March 12, 1924. He was interred at Cincinnati's Spring Grove Cemetery, 69 paces from the grave of his fraternity brother, Senator Joseph Benson Forake.
