= Cornell literary societies =

19th-century student groups at Cornell University

Cornell literary societies were a group of 19th-century student organizations at Cornell University in Ithaca, New York, formed for the purpose of promoting language skills and oratory. The U.S. Bureau of Education described three of them as a "purely literary society" following the traditions of the old literary societies of Eastern universities. At their peak, Cornell's literary societies met in a room called Society Hall, located within North University (now White Hall).

== History ==
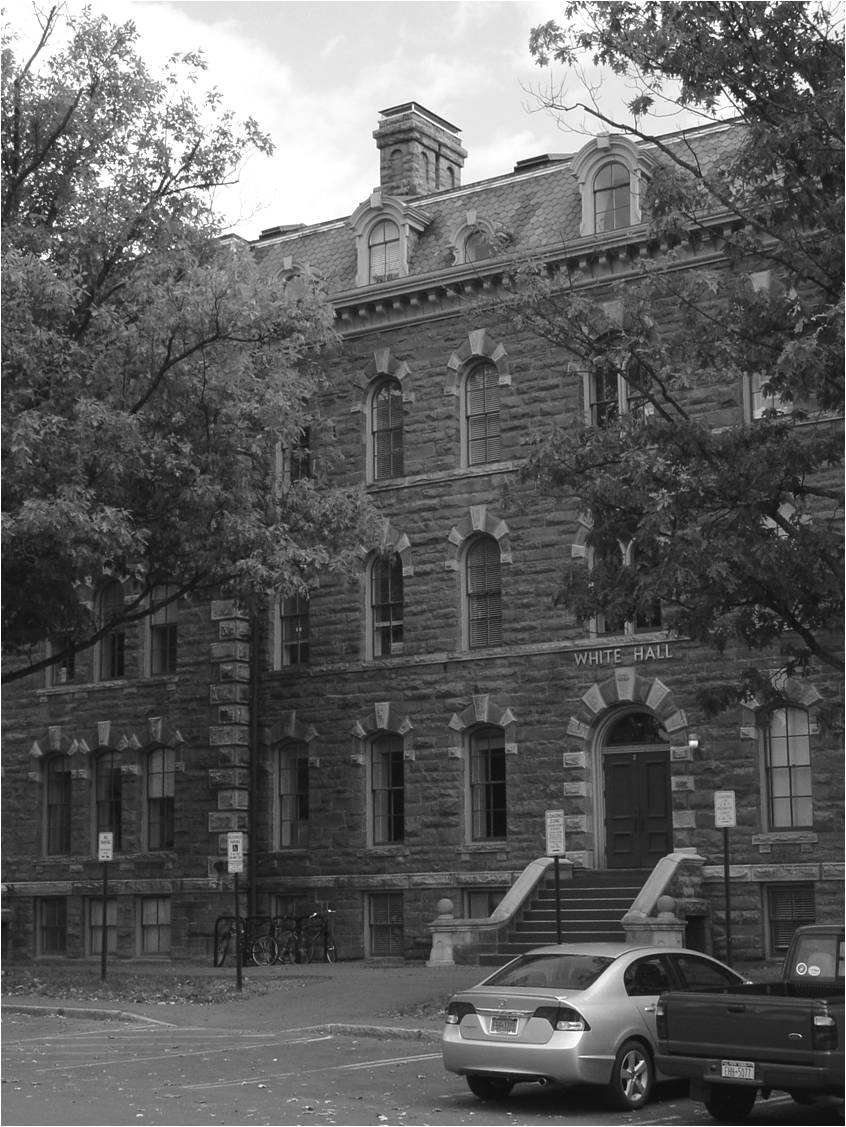
Andrew Dickson White Hall, which housed Society Hall, the main meeting room for Cornell University's literary societies in the 19th century. Society Hall was on the ground floor, three windows to the left of the main door.

=== 1853–1888 ===
The Amphicyton Literary Society was the first literary society at Cornell College, formed in 1853, four days after the college opened. The Philomathean Literary Society was created for female students in 1857. The Adelphian Literary Society was established in 1859. In 1871, the Miltonian Literary Society formed.

In 1877, the four literary societies were ranked according to seniority in the Cornell Register: the Irving founded in 1868; the Philaletheian founded in 1868; the Adelphi founded in 1870; and the Curtis founded in 1872. Competition was an early trait of literary society life at Cornell. Beginning in February 1870, the Irving and the Philaletheian held their annual contest against one another. That event has been noted as one reason why the quality of debate was so high between 1869 and 1884.

Other associations formed after the Irving. The Young Men's Catholic Literary Association held a meeting in November 1869 at Deming Hall on Ithaca's State Street. The subject of debate was "Resolved, That the French Revolution exerted a beneficial effect on the civilization of Europe." Besides the Irving and Philaletheian, other smaller societies met to provide opportunities for those not competitive within the two larger societies, whether for lack of opportunity or fear of the Irving and Philaletheian's larger audiences.

The Irving and Philaletheian Societies were regarded as the foremost of Cornell undergraduate institutions; the smaller societies were the training leagues for the elevated two. In 1870, the second year of the university's operation, the Johnsonian Society and the Adelphi were founded, but the Johnsonian only lasted until 1872. Even more short-lived were the Grove, Lowell, and Philolexian societies, which were founded in 1871 and ceased operations shortly thereafter. Lowell used its membership fees to support a reading room in the old Cornell Public Library in downtown Ithaca for the use of patrons.

As the Cornell Era supposed to be midway through the university's second year,

We are glad to note the organization of two or three small literary societies among the students, one of which holds its meetings in one of the University lecture rooms. These do in a humbler way, although perhaps as effectually, the work of the large societies and interest those who are not confident enough to appear before large audiences.

The three societies, the Irving, Curtis, and Philaletheian, combined efforts to produce their own publication, the Cornell Review, in December 1873. The Review was a repository of original articles, essays, stories, Woodford orations, elaborate discussions, and poems. It was first published by representatives of the literary societies. After 1880, an editor from the debating club replaced the candidate from the defunct Philaletheian. The Curtis died out a few years later. The Curtis’ possessions were routed over to the American History Section Room, provided to Professor Tyler. After 1883, the Cornell Review drew its editors from the Irving and the debating club. Three editors, a sophomore, junior, and senior, were appointed by the retiring Review board. Issued first as a quarterly in 1873, it became a monthly in 1874–1875. And throughout the 1880s, the surviving literary societies competed against new student interests, such as the Cornell Congress and the emerging Cornell Athletics. Literary exercises were also conducted within social fraternities, which undercut the need for separate societies that drew members from multiple fraternities or independents.

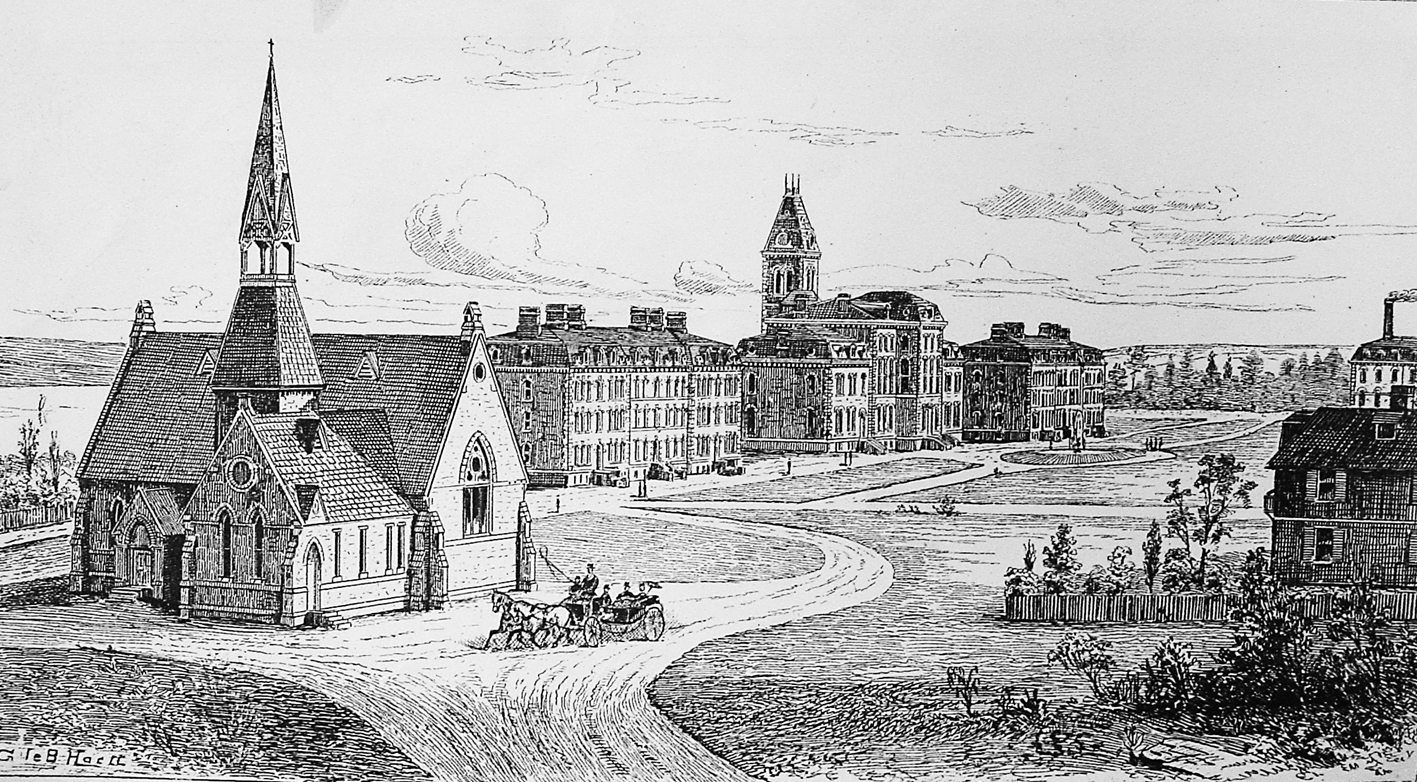
Society Hall was at the north end of Stone Row

=== Society Hall ===
The creation of a Society Hall was proposed by Andrew Dickson White with a $1,000 gift in January to be matched by $300 from the members of all the societies that would use the facilities. As for the site, Room M, North University (later called White 10) was chosen. During the spring of 1870, Andrew Dickson White allocated a large room inside the center door of what is now called Andrew Dickson White Hall, for the use of the literary societies. The room is now called the Dean's Seminar Room. At the time, White Hall was called North University and housed the engineering department as well as the office of Professor Goldwin Smith. Society Hall became one of the standard stops on the Cornell campus tour and was described in the Cornell Era of June 29, 1870:

This is a large and beautifully furnished room used for meetings of the two chief literary societies and the Students’ Christian Association. It is carpeted, and its walls are partly wainscoted in two woods, partly tinted. On them, supported by bronze brackets, are placed nine full-length bronze statuettes executed in Paris and representing the following historic characters: Washington, Franklin, Shakespeare, Newton, Moliere, Goethe, Cervantes, Dante and Michelangelo. Interspersed between these are twenty large engravings, many of them proof impressions, depicting important scenes in the history of America and other countries. A half-hour may well be devoted to their examination, since some of the imported ones are exceedingly rare in this country. Nor should the handsome desk on the president’s rostrum be neglected, noteworthy as it is for the elegance of its design and the thoroughness of its execution. All the fittings of this hall are of the most substantial kind.”

The Society Hall room marked the first recognition that university-supplied space should be devoted to student activities and organizations. This further evolved with the parlor rooms in the Sage College for women in 1872, with the construction of Barnes Hall to house the Students’ Christian Association in 1888, and finally with the construction of Willard Straight Hall as the student union in 1925.

=== Decline ===
By the 1890s, many literary societies across the United States were declining, with the serious survivors turning into debating clubs. Cornell's controversial transition from literary societies to amusing extracurricular activities occurred in the 1880s. When the literary societies proposed, through the Cornell Era, the substitution of charades or mock trials for traditional literary activities, more conservative editors at the University of Virginia refused. The literary societies were starting to entertain activities of a less intellectual and more social nature. The transition from purely literary to amusing activities was noted by President Andrew Dickson White. His professional opinion was that the decline of Cornell's undergraduate literary societies followed from the growth of Cornell's Greek System, the decline of oratory as a valued skill in late 19th-century America, and Charles Kendall Adams' reforms, which brought the "seminary" or seminar system to the university.

The last of the original Cornell literary societies, the Irving, ceased public operations by 1888. According to the Cornell Magazine, the Irving held its last meeting at Society Hall on May 27, 1887. The Cornell Debate Association performs a similar function to the literary societies at present.

The initial decline of the literary societies was followed by a period of inactivity for about five or six years, after which there was a revived interest in student debates. The revival would not place the literary societies back in their position at the forefront of Cornell institutions, but it did provide a lasting place for oral debate on the Hill. The source of the 1890s revival of intercollegiate competitions has been generally attributed to Western colleges and their challenges to the Eastern elite institutions. At Cornell, this challenge occurred as the university was establishing a professorship in elocution, and competitions followed.

In 1900, the United States Bureau of Education cited the experience of the Irving, Philalatheian, and Curtis as evidence that the East Coast's traditional literary culture did not take root at the new Cornell University in the same manner as at Harvard University, Yale University, the University of Pennsylvania, and other "seaboard" schools. The Land Grant college undergraduate culture was increasing in organized athletics. However, during their preeminence, the Irving and its peers produced literature at a higher rate than the campus average for the next generation, leading commentators at the turn of the 20th century to question whether academic standards had fallen since Cornell University's founding. The 1900 report observed that all of the Cornell literary societies had "disappeared."

== Societies ==
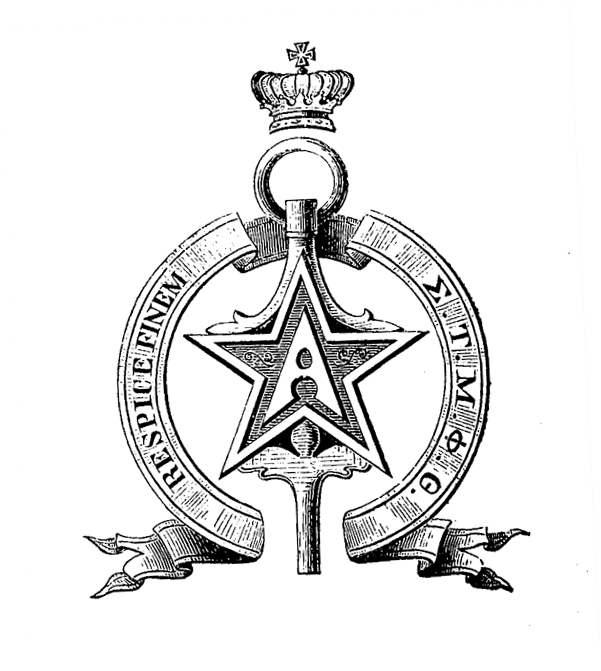
The Adelphi's coat of arms

=== Adelphi ===
The Adelphi Society of Adelphia Society was a secret literary society founded on January 16, 1870. It was noted for bringing George Francis Train to Ithaca, New York, for a presentation. It was active from 1870 to 1877. Its members included the banker Joseph C. Hendrix and historian Emilius O. Randall.

=== Curtis Society ===
The George William Curtis Literary Society, or Curtis Society, named for the transcendentalist writer and orator George William Curtis, was founded on October 10, 1872. The Curtis was the first of the Cornell literary societies to admit women. The Curtis census during the fall of 1880 was about the same as the Cornell Club, the new debate forum. Each mustered about fifteen students. An example of Curtis's debate would be the November 1880 exercise: "Resolved, that suffrage be extended to women." The next month, Hidesabro Saze lectured on Japan. The following term, the Curtis provided new formats, such as the presentation of papers on a common topic like "The Contrast between Germany and Italy." When conducting these exercises, the members would also perform music from the cultures featured. The members also conducted mock trials.

The society died out in October 1881. Among its members was the jurist Wilmot Moses Smith, who co-wrote the lyrics to Far Above Cayuga's Waters, Cornell's alma mater. On December 7, 1893, the name (but not the society itself) was resurrected when a group of undergraduates formed the Curtis Debating Club with separate organizations for sophomores, juniors, and seniors, and a combined membership of 75 men. Eventually, an overall Cornell Union was established to coordinate all of the debating clubs.

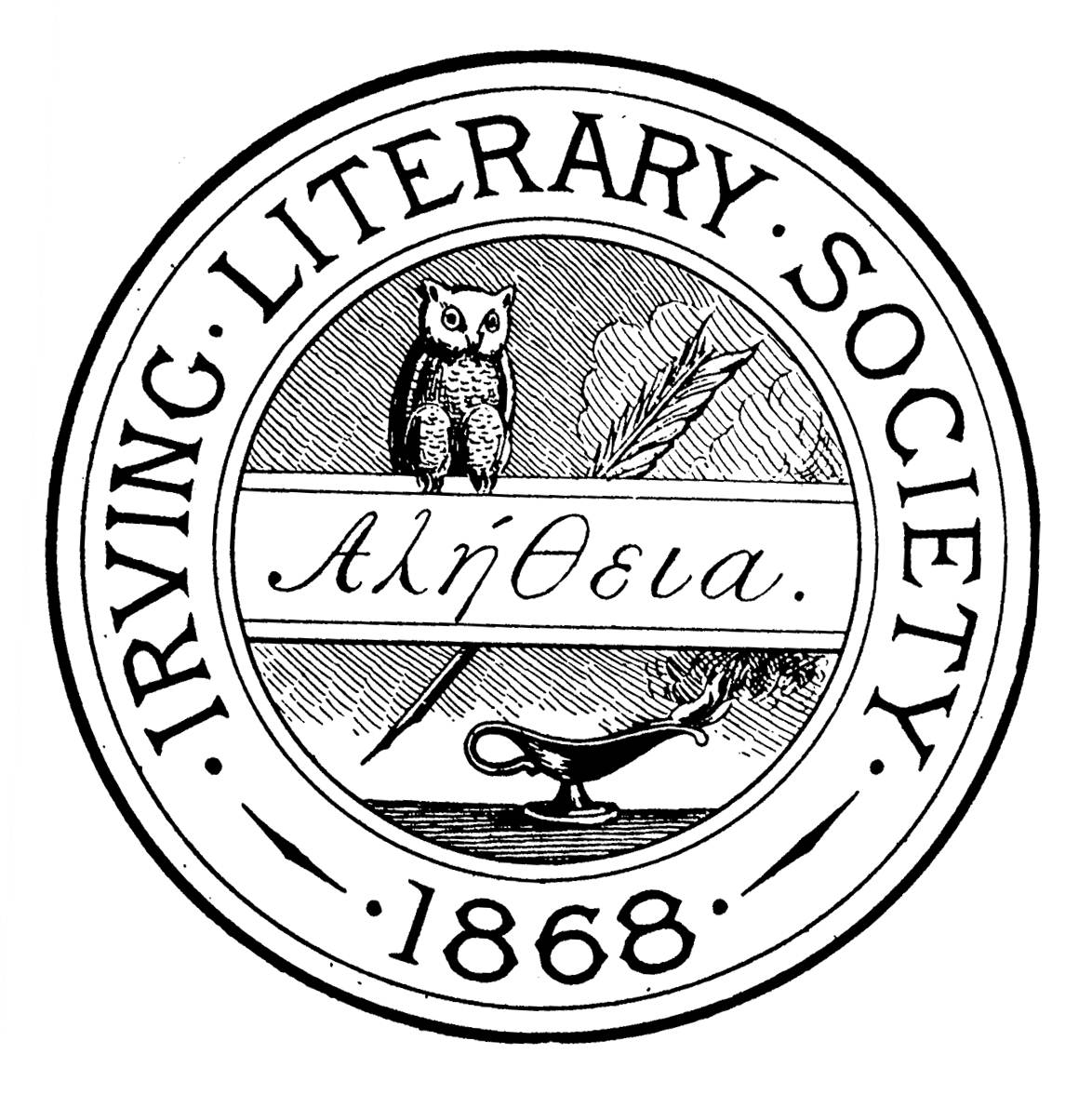
The Irving Literary Society's crest

=== Irving Literary Society ===
Cornell's first literary society was the Irving Literary Association, later the Irving Literary Society. It held its first business meeting in Room No. 4, Cascadilla Place, on October 20, 1868, some thirteen days after Cornell University opened its doors. It was named after the New York-born writer and historian Washington Irving. In 1884, three years before its final demise, the Ithaca Daily Democrat lamented its decline under mechanical and engineering students pursuing technical interests in the mid-1880s.

=== Johnsonian Society ===
The Samuel Johnson Society or Johnsonian Society was named in honor of Samuel Johnson. It was founded in 1870 and lasted until 1872.

=== Lowell Society ===
Founded in 1871, the James Russell Lowell Society was named in honor of James Russell Lowell.

=== Philaletheian Society ===
The Philaletheian was founded on November 1, 1868, with Dudley W. Rhodes as its first president. Rhodes went on to become the valedictorian of Cornell's first graduating class. Unlike the Irving and Curtis societies, the Philaletheian limited its membership to men. On December 18, 1868, it held Cornell's first public exhibition at the Aurora Street Methodist Episcopal Church, where they debated, "Resolved, that a two-thirds majority of the Supreme Court should be necessary to annul an Act of Congress."

In the autumn of 1878, the Philaletheian changed its name, derived from the Greek word meaning "lover of truth", to the Cornell Debating Club. Its members decided that, as its activities were exclusively concentrated on debate, a classical name was no longer appropriate. The society ceased to exist in 1885.

=== Philolexian Society ===
The Philolexian Society was founded in 1872.

== See also ==
- College literary societies
- List of college literary societies
