= Festus Walters =

American judge (1849–1922)

Judge of the Ohio Courts of Common Pleas Second Subdivision, Fifth Judicial District
- In office Fall, 1894 – 1922

Personal details
- Born: September 30, 1849 Fairfield County, Ohio
- Died: 1922 (aged around 73)
- Party: Republican
- Spouse: May E. Walters (married 1876–1922)
- Parent(s): Daniel Walters; Mary Walters
- Education: Cornell University; University of Michigan

Festus Walters (1849 – 1922) was an Ohio jurist and advocate for gubernatorial judicial independence known for the controversial decision to try an Ohio National Guard commander for murder following the Washington County Courthouse riots of 1895. Among "the Ohio Five" arriving at Cornell University when that revolutionary institution opened its doors, he was life-long friends with fellow Cornellian and fraternity brother, Senator Joseph B. Foraker.

In 1898, the official history of the Republican Party in Ohio stated that:

[t]he Republican party may well be judged by its degree of intelligence, its usefulness and safety in the management of public affairs, and its achievements during the forty years of its existence. It is a party of principle, and though its opponents may criticise its doctrines they cannot deny that it has always had the courage of its convictions. As long as it continues it will attract to its ranks men of brilliant minds and intellectual giants who give freely of their great gifts to aid the maintenance of a party that has done so much for the prosperity of the country. Ohio has in the past contributed her share of famous men, and as the years roll on the names of others are added one by one to the rapidly increasing list. One that has become prominently associated with the political history of the state is that of Judge Festus Walters . Personally, the Judge is courteous and affable, and is an excellent entertainer, though not a society man in the strict sense of the word.

== The Peters family ==
Festus Walters descended from the maternal line of the Peters family of Fairfield County, Ohio. It is unknown when the Peters' ancestor landed in the United States, or from what country, but they settled in southern Ohio, in Philadelphia, married, and sired two sons born in Philadelphia, Jacob and Henry. Henry died without issue. Jacob married. He moved south to Baltimore, raising three sons and one daughter. The daughter married a man named Burns. The sons were John, Jacob, and Samuel.

Samuel, son of Jacob and the ancestor of Ohio's Judge Festus Walters, was born in Philadelphia on September 27, 1772. He died at his home in Amanda township, Fairfield County, Ohio, September 10, 1829. His wife was Mary Stevenson, daughter of Daniel Stevenson, of Baltimore County, Maryland. She was born September 28, 1773, and died in Fairfield County, February 15, 1861, aged 87 years. Their oldest son, Henry Peters, was born October 1, 1796. They trekked to the Ohio valley in April, 1812, and lived for five years on what became the Frank Stevenson farm. Daniel Stevenson was born September 21, 1737, and died September 3, 1829. Ruth, his wife, was born January 24, 1743, and died January 12, 1834. They were the parents of ten children. They came to Ohio several years before Peters and his wife.

The wife of Samuel Peters was a daughter of Daniel Stevenson, one of the early pioneers of Richland township, and on whose land the first Methodist church in the county was erected. The old homestead remained in the Stevenson family for many years. A grandson of Daniel was the landsman when Festus Walters was sitting on the Ohio bench. There were several brothers and sisters of the Stevenson family, Daniel, Jesse, Mordecai, Edward, Mrs. Peters — who was Judge Walters' grandmother — and Mrs. Hampson were those most remembered; most of them were born in Maryland and came to Ohio with their father as early as 1803.

Daniel Stevenson, the pioneer and father of this family, was a prominent man of the Republic's early days and respected for his sterling character. He was a Methodist and donated land for the first church in the county built with hewn logs. He entertained the evangelist Bishop Asbury during his visits to Fairfield County, and it was on his land where Asbury conducted the first camp meeting held in the county.

Mr. Peters and wife arrived in the Ohio valley in 1812 and settled two miles north of West Rushville, on Rush Creek, at the mouth of Snake run. The Peters remained on Rush Creek for about five years before they purchased land south of Royalton, later owned by Benjamin Haas, cut a farm and endured pioneer life. Here they spent their lives as farmers and rearing a large family of children. Mr. Peters was a man of sterling character and possessed good business sense.

Peters was beloved in his neighborhood, and exerted an influence in the community with a success in rearing a large family to honorable and useful lives. His sons were Henry, Nathan, Robinson J., Ebenezer, Wesley, Gideon, Stevenson, Lewis, and Andrew, most of whom lived to old age and all business men. Nine brothers, successful in business, most of them of a commanding presence. As a commentator stated three generations later, "Take this family, the Stevenson family, the Beery family, where can you find such large families of stalwart, robust long-lived men? Where can we find such men, even in small families? Are we degenerating?"

These men were the uncles of Judge Festus Walters. Henry Peters at an early day moved to Marion County. When the Wyandotte Indians transferred their lands, he moved to Wyandot County. He was a sagacious man who prospered and made good investments. He died in Upper Sandusky, and left to his heirs an ample estate. Upon the death of his brother Gideon, he took charge of his children and reared them, and at his death they were well remembered. Brother Nathan Peters moved to Marion County at an early date. He engaged in farming for a number of years and was successful. His old age was spent in Marion where he owned a fine home. Nathan's son Harvey was for many years a Marion leading pharmacist. Ebenezer Peters moved at an early day to Marion County where he was a prosperous farmer and stock dealer. Like all of his brothers he was a good business man and respected and honored by his neighbors. He died at an advanced age. In middle age he resided in Marion where he took an active part in politics and assisted in electing Samuel A. Griswold county auditor. The Peters name is prevalent in Marion and Upper Sandusky. Stevenson and Lewis became farmers and located in Pickaway County, near Nebraska P. O. Like their brothers they were successful in business, accumulated property and lived in good style. They were among the prominent members of the Methodist Episcopal Church in that vicinity. Lewis Peters was an unusually intelligent man, of good social qualities and a man of influence and highly esteemed. One of his sons married a daughter of Rev. John W. White of Lancaster, Ohio, and resided in Upper Sandusky.

A son of Lewis Peters, and cousin to Judge Festus Walters, was the Honorable S. R. Peters, of Newton, Kansas, an old Pickaway County boy, born in Walnut township in 1842, seven years before Judge Walters. S.R. Peters was a graduate of Delaware University (Ohio Wesleyan), and served through the war as a member of the Seventy-third regiment, Ohio Volunteer Infantry, mustering out of the service as captain. He went to Kansas following the war, and in a little over a year after arriving he began his political career. He was a member of the Kansas State Senate, judge of the Ninth Judicial District, a trying region to hold court. Judge S.R. Peters was three times elected to •the difficult position without opposition. In 1883 he was elected at large to the Forty-Eighth United States Congress. In 1890, he declined further congressional honors, preferring to practice his profession. Judge Peters became the postmaster at Newton, Kansas, and editor of the Kansas Republican, published in that city. He also practiced law. Judge Peters' wife was Amelia C. Doan, daughter of Rev. John Doan, and they were married in Circleville in April, 1867. Mrs. Peters was a universal favorite in Washington, D.C., society during their residence in that city.

Judge Peter's great aunt, Mary Peters married Daniel Walters and they spent their lives upon a farm in Amanda township. Judge Festus Walters of the Common Pleas Court of Circleville, was their son. He has attained quite a prominent position at the bar.

== Early life ==
Walters was born in Fairfield County, Ohio, September 30, 1849, the son of Daniel and Mary (Peters) Walters. Dan Walters was of German descent and Mary Peters was of English descent. Walters' father was a farmer by occupation and in politics he voted the Whig ticket. His death occurred in 1855, when Walters was six years old. Walters spent his boyhood days mostly as an assistant to his father, working on the farm and attending the district school two months in the year. He remained at home until age sixteen, when he entered the Ohio University at Athens, to prepare for college. After finishing the preparatory course he attended the Ohio Wesleyan University at Delaware, studying there until 1868, when he transferred as a junior to Cornell University, from which he graduated in 1870.

Walters pursued his Cornell studies with the definite purpose of taking up the profession of law. He was among "the Ohio men" founding the Cornell chapter of the Phi Kappa Psi fraternity, the first Chapter north of the Susquehanna and east of the Ohio rivers. He was a member, Irving Literary Society. Immediately after leaving Cornell University he began a course in the law department of the University of Michigan at Ann Arbor. Walters was graduated from University of Michigan Law School in 1872. The next year he passed examination and was admitted to the bar at Columbus, Ohio, and at once went to Circleville, where he began the practice of his profession. Fresh out of Michigan law, Walter challenged Michigan classmate J.P. Winstead '72 in the election for Pickaway County, Ohio's prosecuting attorney position. He lost. Walters was married December 21, 1876, to Miss May E. Wilkes, of Circleville, and they had seven children.

Walters practiced law in the 1870s and 1880s. The habits of industry formed in his youth he carried with him in his mature years, and when he entered into a case he gave it time, labor and the best efforts of his well trained mind. Being a man of prepossessing appearance and easy manners, having a strong, logical mind and being a fluent and concise speaker, he early in his career took a position in the front rank of Ohio's Pickaway County bar. His whole time and attention was given to his profession and during the last ten years of his practice there was but little important litigation in the local courts in which he did not actively participate on one side or the other. His practice was general and extended into the county, state and federal courts. In referring to the professional side of his life, one of the oldest and ablest members of the Pickaway County bar has this to say of Judge Walters:

Great lawyers, like great poets, are born, not made; and Judge Walters belongs to that class of men who were born with a natural aptitude for the legal profession. His natural gifts have been supplemented by a careful and systematic course of training and he is recognized as one of the able lawyers of the state. Had his lot been cast in a larger center of population, where greater opportunities present themselves, he undoubtedly would have risen to much greater prominence; but he is still comparatively young, and his light will in time grow brighter. His mind has a legal trend and is well stored with an accurate knowledge of the principles of law. He possesses in a remarkable degree the elements of a good lawyer, is a fluent talker, a logical reasoner, and has quick perceptions and sound judgment. He is clear, accurate, impartial and firm, and no man ever sat on the bench who inspired greater confidence to the practitioners at the bar than does Judge Walters.

== Electoral politics and judicial elections ==
Walters was a delegate to the 1888 Republican Party's National Convention in Chicago. In the fall of 1894 he, at the earnest solicitations of his party friends, accepted the nomination for Common-Pleas Judge of the Second Subdivision, Fifth Judicial District, which was when they unanimously tendered him. The nomination was recognized as a most fitting one and he was elected over Judge I. N. Abernethy, the Democratic candidate, by a majority of two thousand and eight hundred votes. The Second Subdivision covered Highland, Fayette, Madison, Ross and Pickaway counties. He was reelected to the Court of Common Pleas in 1899. Walters took his seat on the Court of Common Pleas for Washington County in February 1891 and had been a delegate to the Republican National Convention at Chicago in 1888. In 1892 he was a candidate for the United States Congress, but failed to be nominated. From 1875 through to the end of the century, Judge Walters was a worker in all the Presidential campaigns under the state committees, and acquired a reputation for being a powerful" stump" speaker.

Fetus Walters was a personal friend of J. B. Foraker, and it was well known that he attended the same school as Senator Foraker, Judge Bookwater [sic][of Cincinnati],^{[why use sic outside a quote?]} Judge Spence and J. P. Ray [sic][J.A. Rae] at Delaware and at Cornell University. At Cornell, Foraker, Buchwalter, Spence, and Ray were all a year ahead of Walters. All five were brothers of the New York Alpha chapter of Phi Kappa Psi. Walters was also one of the assignees of Q. E. Sears & Company, canners, and was later manager of the estate. He favored a protective tariff and a gold standard. As his fraternity brother Joseph Benson Foraker rose in national politics and was required to spend more time in New York City and Washington, D.C., Judge Festus Walters was "Fire Alarm Joe's" eyes and ears back in Ohio.

== The remainder of the judge's career, and death ==
In 1902, Judge Fetus Walters was elected circuit judge in the Fourth Circuit, for a six-year term ending in 1908, without an opposing candidate, the circuit being largely Republican. Judge Festus Walters retired as the Presiding Judge of the federal Judicial District of Ohio in 1903, and finished out his judicial career on the Circuit Court of Ohio, serving on the Fourth Circuit from February 9, 1903, to February 8, 1913, for his first term and, a second term, from February 9, 1913, to February 8, 1921. At the close of his second term, Robert Z. Buchwalter, son of his fraternity brother, Judge Morris Lyons Buchwalter, was elected to serve on the First Circuit for a term starting February 9, 1921. The year after Judge Walters stepped down from the bench, he died. His judicial career included long sessions on the Court of Common Pleas, the Circuit Court, and the Court of Appeals.
