= Superior Drill Company =

Manufacturer of farming implements

- Industry: Manufacturing
- Founded: 1880s
- Founder: Edward Lyon Buchwalter
- Defunct: 1903
- Headquarters: Springfield, Ohio, United States
- Products: Farming

Superior Drilling Company was a manufacturer of farming implements that formed in the 1880s to 1903 in Springfield, Ohio, United States. Edward Lyon Buchwalter was one of the organizers of the Superior Drill Company and president of the same from 1883 to 1903. In 1903, the company and several other companies merged to form the American Seeding Machine Company.

== History of the Company ==
Though roots of formation of the Superior Drill Company can be traced back to the 1840s, they didn't become prevalent as a company till the 1880s. The trade name "Superior" under the Superior Trade Co. was first used in 1892 and manufacturing began in Springfield, Ohio.

They imprinted in their advertising, "The Best in the World". American Civil War Capt. Edward Lyon Buchwalter was one of the organizers of the Superior Drill Company and president of the same from 1883 to 1903. In 1903, the company and several other companies merged to form the American Seeding Machine Company.

== Types of Products Manufactured ==
=== Cultivating Implements ===
- One Horse Drills
- The Superior Plain Hoe Drill With Seat
- Shoe Drills
- Corn cultivators

=== Cultivating/Seeding Combo Implements ===
- "The No. 2 Superior Solid Steel Frame Drill for 1892" - was a single horse/walk behind drive. Furnished with reversible pointed Pin Hoes, Spring Hoes, Pressure or gauge wheel attachment, as desired that was available in 8 to 16 hoes. Featured a detachable grass seed attachment and New Adjustable Hitch. Advertised: "Is the lightest running and easiest drill to operate ever put on the market."

=== Fertilizing Implements ===
- "The Superior Steel Frame Fertilizer Drill No#3"-Single Horse, walk behind driven#

=== Hay Processing Implements ===
- Hay Carriers
- Hay Forks

=== Product Processing Implements ===
==== Cider Mills ====
- Champion Cider Mill
- Buckeye Cider Mill
