= Festus Thomas =

Namibian politician and member of parliament

Member of the National Assembly of Namibia
- Incumbent
- Assumed office 20 March 2025

Personal details
- Born: 5 April 1963 (age 63) Okongo, Ohangwena Region
- Party: Body of Christ Party

Festus Thomas (born 5 April 1963) is a Namibian politician who is leader of the Body of Christ Party who has been a member of the Parliament of Namibia since 2025. He was elected in the 2024 Namibian general election. The Body of Christ Party was founded in 2018 by Bishop Festus Thomas based on Christian principles.

== See also ==
- List of members of the 8th National Assembly of Namibia
