= Festus Ogun =

Nigerian lawyer

Festus Ogun is a Nigerian lawyer. In November 2021, he sued Ogun State Governor, Dapo Abiodun, for failing to disclose findings of the End SARS panel in the state. In 2021, Ogun founded FOLEGAL, a law firm providing outstanding regulatory, litigation and transactional solutions to clients’ most complex challenges. He has said that he was once beat and stripped naked for his activities.

== Education ==
Festus had his primary education at Ifelodun United Primary School, Efire, Ogun State. He then attended The Pathfinder College, Ibiade, Ogun State. He studied Law at Olabisi Onabanjo University, Ago-Iwoye, Ogun State and graduated in 2019 before proceeding to the Nigerian Law School, Victoria Island, Lagos.
