= Nicholas Longworth II =

American judge (1844–1890)

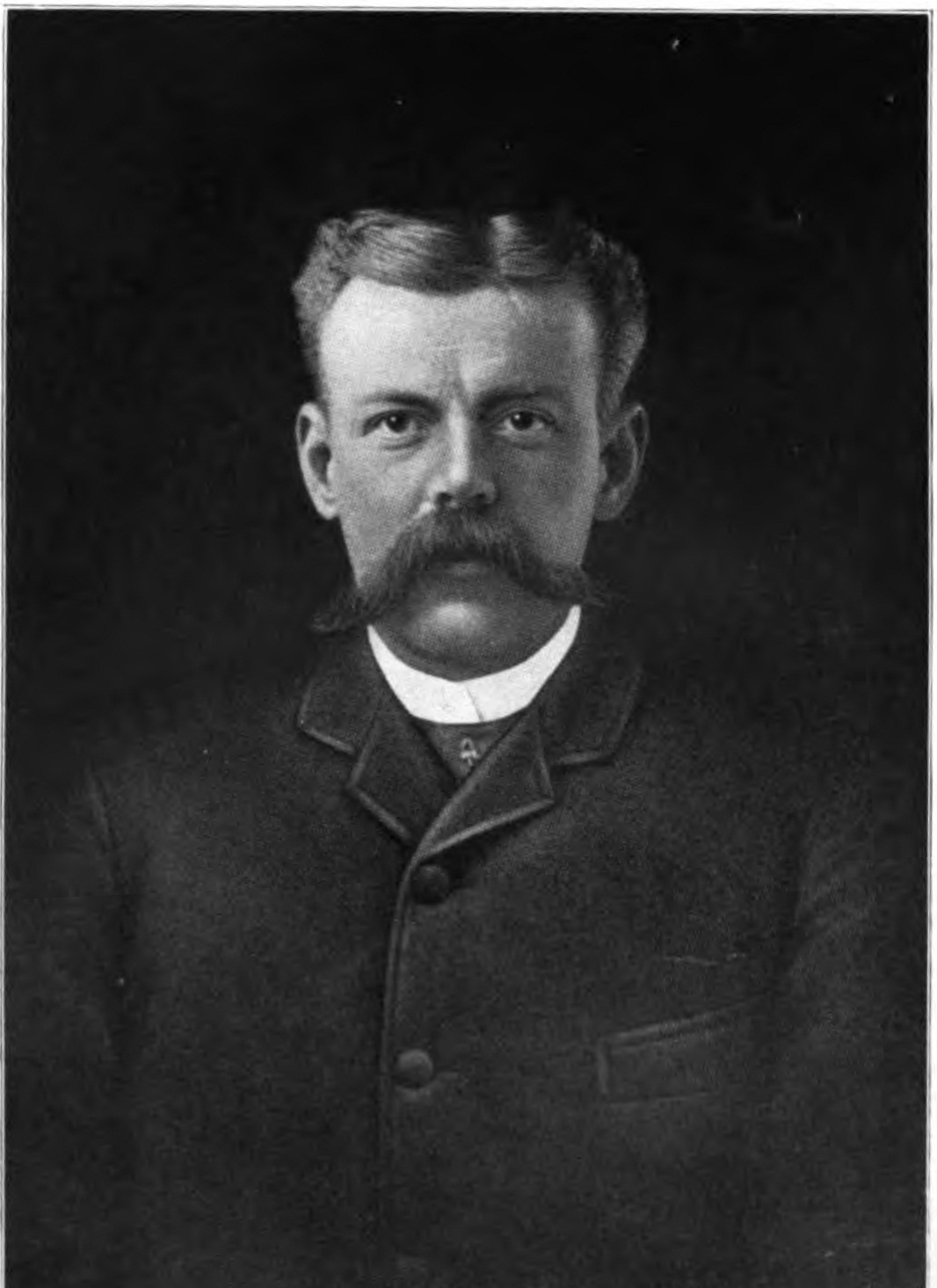

Ohio Supreme Court Justice
- In office November 9, 1881 – March 9, 1883
- Preceded by: Washington W. Boynton
- Succeeded by: John H. Doyle

Personal details
- Born: June 16, 1844 Mount Adams, Cincinnati, Ohio
- Died: January 18, 1890 (aged 45) Mount Adams, Cincinnati, Ohio
- Resting place: Spring Grove Cemetery
- Party: Republican
- Spouse: Susan Walker
- Children: Nicholas Longworth III; Annie Rives Wallingford; Clara Longworth de Chambrun
- Education: Harvard University; Cincinnati Law School

Nicholas Longworth II (June 16, 1844 – January 18, 1890) was a lawyer from a prominent Cincinnati, Ohio, family who served on the Ohio Supreme Court.

== Biography ==
Nicholas Longworth II was born June 16, 1844, in Cincinnati to Joseph and Anna Rives Longworth. Joseph Longworth was the only son of Nicholas Longworth, a lawyer, winemaker and land speculator, who came to Cincinnati in 1804, and for the year 1850 had a tax bill of $17,000, second only to John Jacob Astor in the United States. Anna Rives was the niece of William Cabell Rives.

Longworth was educated at the public schools in Cincinnati, and graduated from Harvard University in 1866 with high honors. He then studied law under his uncle, (his mother's brother-in-law), Rufus King at the Cincinnati Law School, and was admitted to the bar in 1869. He had a partnership with his cousin, Edward L. Anderson, which dissolved in 1871. From 1871 to 1877 he practiced with the firm of King, Thompson and Longworth.

In 1876, Longworth was elected to the Common Pleas Court of Hamilton County for a five-year term. On October 11, 1881, he was elected on the Republican ticket to the Ohio Supreme Court. On November 9, 1881, Washington W. Boynton resigned his seat three months before the end of his term due to ill health and meager salary, and Longworth was seated on that day. His term was scheduled to end in February, 1887.

Longworth resigned from the court March 9, 1883, due to the failing health of his father, and the need to look after his estate. He formed a short-lived legal partnership with Thomas McDougall, which dissolved upon the elder Longworth's death late in 1883. He managed the business affairs of the estate, and travelled extensively. He also translated Electra from Greek, and had two stories published in 1889. He also had a steam yacht, the C.O., on the Ohio River, and raced yachts on Lake Erie.

Longworth died of pneumonia at Rookwood, his estate on Mount Adams, on January 18, 1890, and was buried at Spring Grove Cemetery. He was married on October 2, or 3, 1869 to Susan Walker. She was the daughter of the late Timothy Walker, one of the founders and Dean of the Cincinnati Law School. They had three children, Nicholas, born November 5, 1869, Annie Rives, born December 10, 1870, and Clara, born October 17, 1873.

== Publications ==
Sophocles; Longworth, Nicholas II (1878). Electra. Robert Clarke & Company. OCLC 002612474.

== See also ==
- Longworth family
- Nicholas Longworth - his son, Speaker of the US House
- Nicholas Longworth (1783-1863) - his grandfather
- Maria Longworth Nichols Storer - his sister
- Timothy Walker (judge) - his father-in-law
- Clara Longworth de Chambrun - his daughter

Justices of the Ohio Supreme Court 1881-1883
1881	William White; 2/10/1864-3/12/1883	Washington W. Boynton; 2/8/1877-11/9/1881	John W. Okey; 2/9/1878-7/25/1885	George W. McIlvaine; 2/9/1871-2/1886	William Wartenbee Johnson; 2/1880-11/1886
1881	William White; 2/10/1864-3/12/1883	Nicholas Longworth II; 11/9/1881-3/9/1883	John W. Okey; 2/9/1878-7/25/1885	George W. McIlvaine; 2/9/1871-2/1886	William Wartenbee Johnson; 2/1880-11/1886
1882	William White	Nicholas Longworth II	John W. Okey	George W. McIlvaine	William Wartenbee Johnson
1883	William White	Nicholas Longworth II	John W. Okey	George W. McIlvaine	William Wartenbee Johnson
1883	William H. Upson; 3/14/1883-12/1883	John H. Doyle; 3/10/1883-12/1883	John W. Okey	George W. McIlvaine	William Wartenbee Johnson
1883	Selwyn N. Owen; 12/1883-2/9/1889	Martin Dewey Follett; 12/1883-2/9/1887	John W. Okey	George W. McIlvaine	William Wartenbee Johnson
