= Nicholas Longworth (disambiguation) =

Nicholas Longworth was an American politician

Nicholas Longworth may also refer to:

- Nicholas Longworth II (1844–1890), father of the politician
- Nicholas Longworth (winemaker) (1783–1863), great-grandfather of the politician
