= Timothy Walker (judge) =

American lawyer

- Born: December 1, 1802; Wilmington, Massachusetts, US
- Died: January 15, 1856 (aged 53); Cincinnati, Ohio, US
- Resting place: Spring Grove Cemetery
- Education: Harvard University; Harvard Law School

Timothy Walker (December 1, 1802 – January 15, 1856) was an American lawyer who founded the Cincinnati Law School and was its first dean.

== Biography ==
Timothy Walker was born in Wilmington, Massachusetts, US, to Benjamin and Susanna (Cook) Walker. He graduated from Harvard in 1826. From 1826 to 1829 he taught mathematics at the Round Hill School, and he studied law at Harvard Law School 1829 and 1830.

In 1831 he moved to Cincinnati, Ohio, where after a year spent in the law office of Bellamy Storer and Charles Fox he was admitted to the bar and joined a practice with the politician Edward King. They were joined in this partnership by another young Cincinnati lawyer, Salmon P. Chase, who left the firm after a few months to pursue his interest in banking law. Around this time Walker and Chase joined a literary salon, the Semi-Colon Club, where Walker met his first wife, Anna Lawler Bryant, the granddaughter of Matthew Lawler.

In 1833, Walker, along with King and John C. Wright, founded the Cincinnati Law School. At the time there were only six other law schools in the country, and it was the first law school in the West. Walker served as Dean, and continued in that position when the school merged with Cincinnati College in 1835. He was Dean 1833 to 1844.

Walker was President Judge of the Hamilton County Court of Common Pleas, founded the Western Law Journal in 1843, and was its editor. His Introduction to American Law (1837, revised several times) was for many years "the most generally used text-book in the country". This book earned him the title "The American Blackstone". Walker wrote a number of other historical and legal books. He was given the degree LL.D. by Harvard in 1854, and was the Phi Beta Kappa orator at that institution in 1850.

Timothy Walker died in Cincinnati in 1856.

== Family ==
Judge Walker was first married to Anna Lawler Bryant at Philadelphia, Pennsylvania on May 9, 1832. She died at the age of 23 following the birth of their second child in Cincinnati in 1834. He married Eleanor Page Wood in Cincinnati on March 11, 1840. Their daughter, Susan, married Nicholas Longworth II, a wealthy Cincinnati judge and member of the Longworth family. Susan's son, Nicholas Longworth would become Speaker of the United States House of Representatives.

The astronomer Sears Cook Walker was Timothy's brother.

== Works ==
- Walker, Timothy (1837). Introduction to American law: designed as a first book for students. Boston: Little Brown and Company.
