= Joseph Longworth =

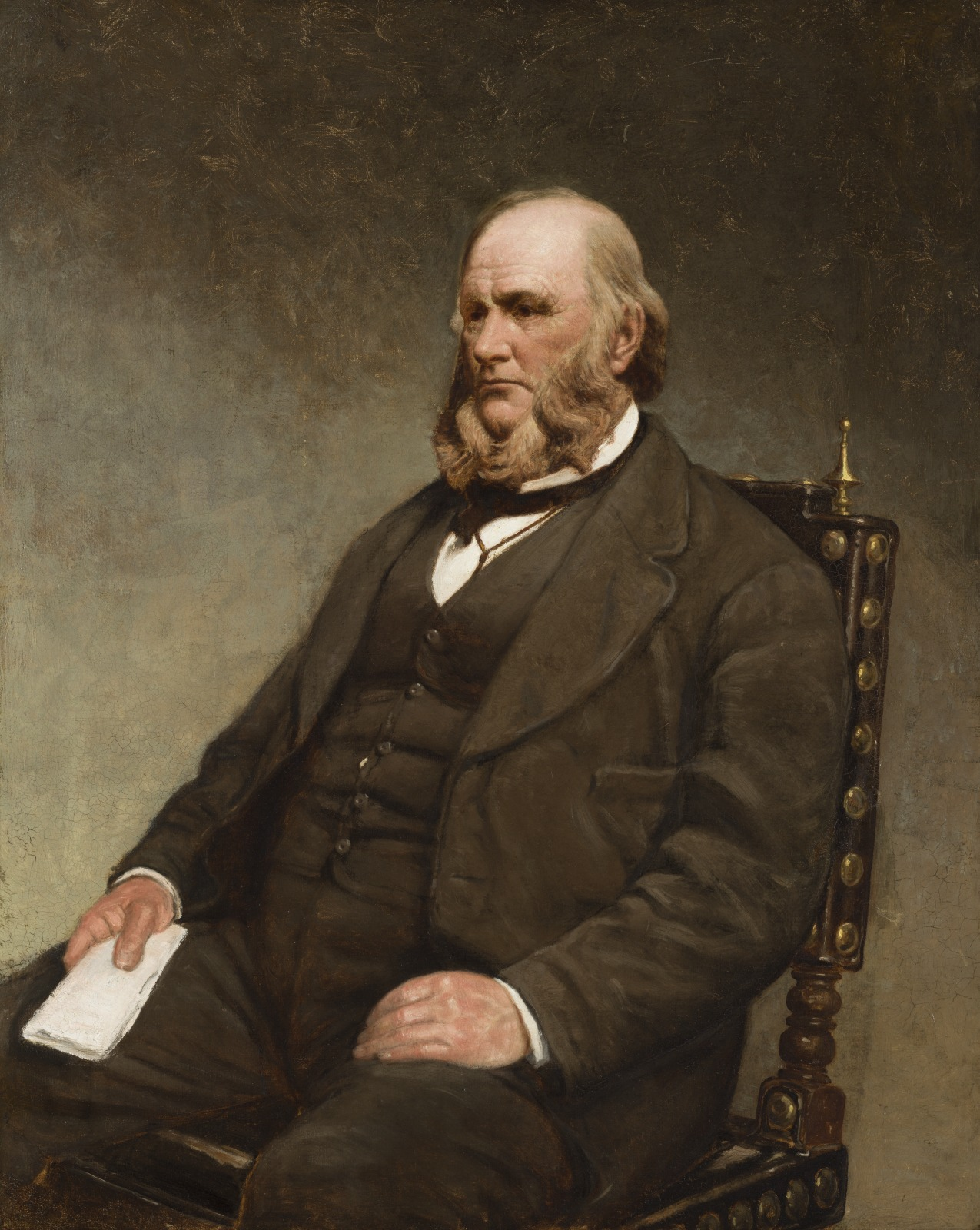
- Posthumous portrait of Longworth by Thomas Satterwhite Noble, 1884
- Born: 2 October 1813; Cincinnati, Ohio, US
- Died: 29 December 1883 (aged 70); Cincinnati, Ohio, US
- Occupations: Art collector, philanthropist

Joseph Longworth (2 October 1813 – 29 December 1883) was an American lawyer, real-estate magnate, art collector, and philanthropist. A member of the wealthy Longworth family, he helped shape cultural life in Cincinnati for a generation. Longworth sold the parcel of land that would become Eden Park, including the land that would be used for the Cincinnati Art Museum. He also contributed to the construction of the museum and served as its first president. Longworth was the "prime mover" for the Art Academy of Cincinnati, arranging the movement of the school to Eden Park, planning its integration with the museum, and endowing it with $370,000. In 2013 the original Art Academy building was renamed the Longworth Wing of the Cincinnati Art Museum in his honor.

== Personal life ==
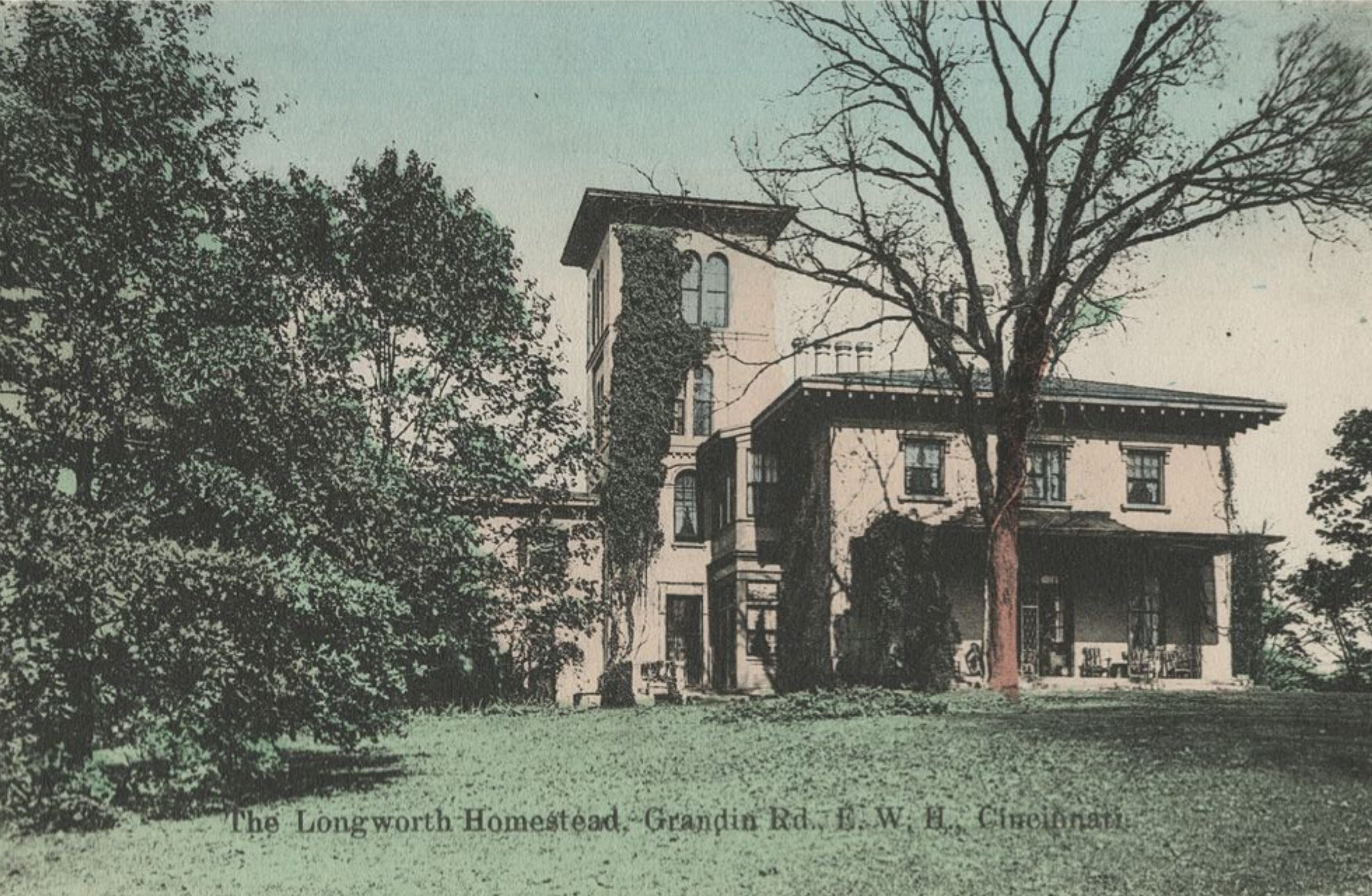
Rookwood, Longworth's estate in present-day Hyde Park, Cincinnati

Longworth was the only son of the wealthy real estate magnate and vintner Nicholas Longworth and his wife Susanna Howell (1786-1865). He was named for his uncle Joseph Longworth (1769-1838), who later died in the Steamer Pulaski disaster. He grew up in Cincinnati and was educated at Yale University. While he received a law degree he did not frequently practice law, instead occupying himself with the management of the family fortune that his father had built up through his real estate business. Longworth substantially expanded his family holdings, buying up farmland in what would become the suburbs of Cincinnati.

On May 13, 1841, he married Anna "Annie" Maria Rives (10 October 1822 – 31 January 1862), the daughter of Landon Cabell Rives (1790-1870) and Anna Maria Towles (1795-1843). The couple had three children: the judge and art patron Nicholas Longworth II, the founder of Rookwood Pottery Maria Longworth Storer, and the surgeon Landon Rives Longworth. Until 1848 the family lived in the family estate "Belmont", which is now the Taft Museum of Art, until moving out to the Rookwood estate in present-day Hyde Park.

Longworth often opined that he would be remembered primarily as "the son of his father and the father of his son"; however, he may be better remembered today as the father of his daughter. In addition to his children, Longworth's descendants include the statesman Nicholas Longworth III, the writer and socialite Clara Longworth de Chambrun, and the French lawyer René de Chambrun.

== Art patronage ==
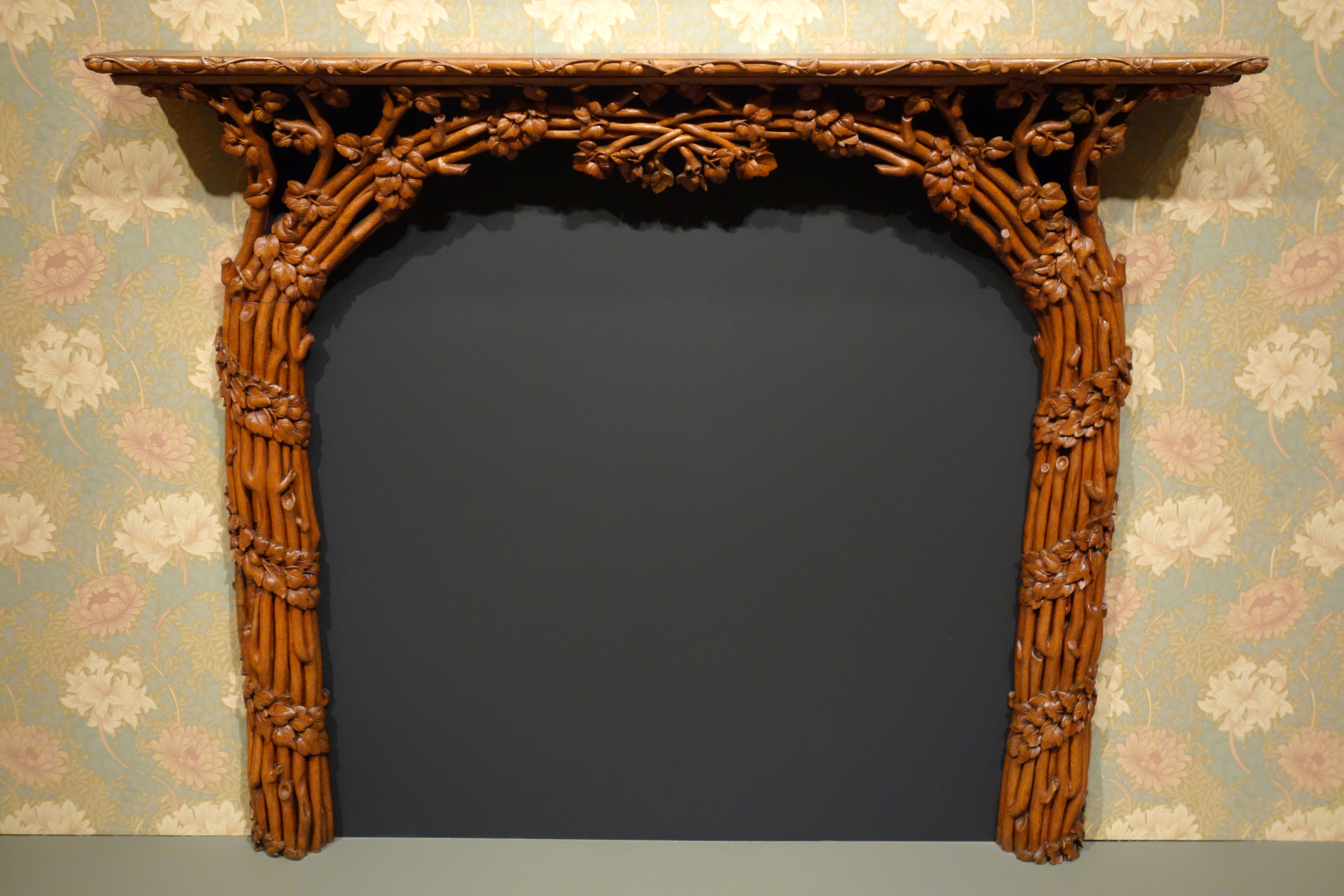
Henry L. and William H. Fry (1850s), Mantel for the Rookwood estate. Cincinnati Art Museum

Longworth was a prominent patron of the arts. He sold parcels of land from his family's vineyards to the city of Cincinnati to be used for Eden Park, including the land that would be used for the Cincinnati Art Museum. Longworth provided a portion of the funding for the museum's construction, and also served as its first president. Further he financially supported the McMicken School of Design, which would later become the Art Academy of Cincinnati, endowing the school with $370,000. Longworth was the "prime mover" toward the Art Academy, advocating for it to be run by the Cincinnati Museum Association, which also administered the Art Museum.

Longworth was also instrumental in the success of Rookwood Pottery, founded by his daughter Maria Longworth Storer. He purchased the first building for the company, a former schoolhouse, in a sheriff sale, and provided funds to cover the pottery's losses during its early years. Longworth facetiously remarked that he supported the pottery "to give employment to the idle rich." Storer named the pottery after her father's estate, which had been her childhood home.

Longworth supported other applied arts as well, commissioning the woodcarver Henry L. Fry and his son William H. Fry to carve furniture for his Rookwood estate in the 1850s. This included an elaborate mantelpiece with a grapevine design inspired by the vineyards that first made the Longworth family successful. The Frys' work was extremely influential in Cincinnati, inspiring a trend of art furniture inspired by the aesthetic movement.

== Art collecting ==
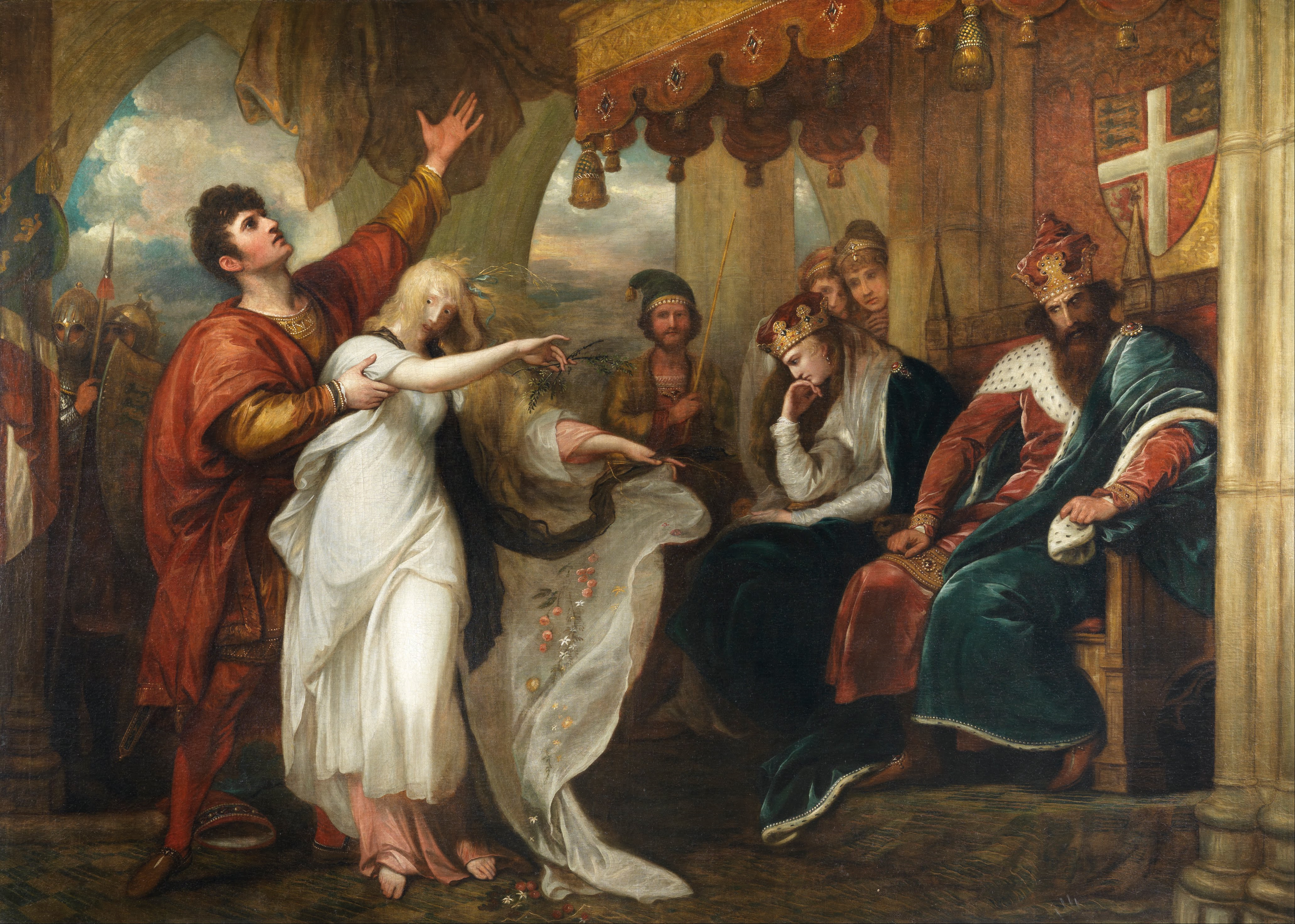
Benjamin West (1792) Laertes and Ophelia. Cincinnati Art Museum

In 1857 Longworth befriended the Düsseldorf School painter Carl Friedrich Lessing during a family trip to Europe. After Lessing's death in 1880 Longworth purchased a large collection of his drawings from his son Otto Lessing.

Over the years Longworth purchased many works by Düsseldorf School painters through his intermediary Worthington Whittredge, especially landscapes by Andreas Achenbach and Lessing. One of his most important purchases, a portfolio of nearly 1000 drawings, was bequeathed to the Cincinnati Art Museum in 1882. Longworth also gifted the massive Benjamin West painting Laertes and Ophelia to the museum, which had been in his father's collection since 1830.

His private collection also included works by Luigi Chialiva, Nicaise de Keyser, Hans Fredrik Gude, Ludwig Knaus, Barend Cornelis Koekkoek, Jusepe de Ribera, and Wilhelm Riefstahl.

== Death and legacy ==
Longworth died on 29 December 1883 of an aneurysm; he had been in ill health for some time, compounded by grief over the early death of his son Landon Rives Longworth, who had died of pneumonia in 1879. He was buried in a private cemetery on the grounds of his Rookwood estate; in 1929 his remains were exhumed and reburied in Spring Grove Cemetery.

In 2013 the former Art Academy of Cincinnati building, which had been physically connected to the Cincinnati Art Museum in 1930, but vacant since the Art Academy had relocated to Over-the-Rhine in 2005, was reopened as the newly named Longworth Wing of the museum. Named in honor of Joseph Longworth, the Longworth Wing contains administrative offices on the first two floors and the Mary R. Schiff Library and Archives on the third floor.
