= Selwyn N. Owen =

American judge

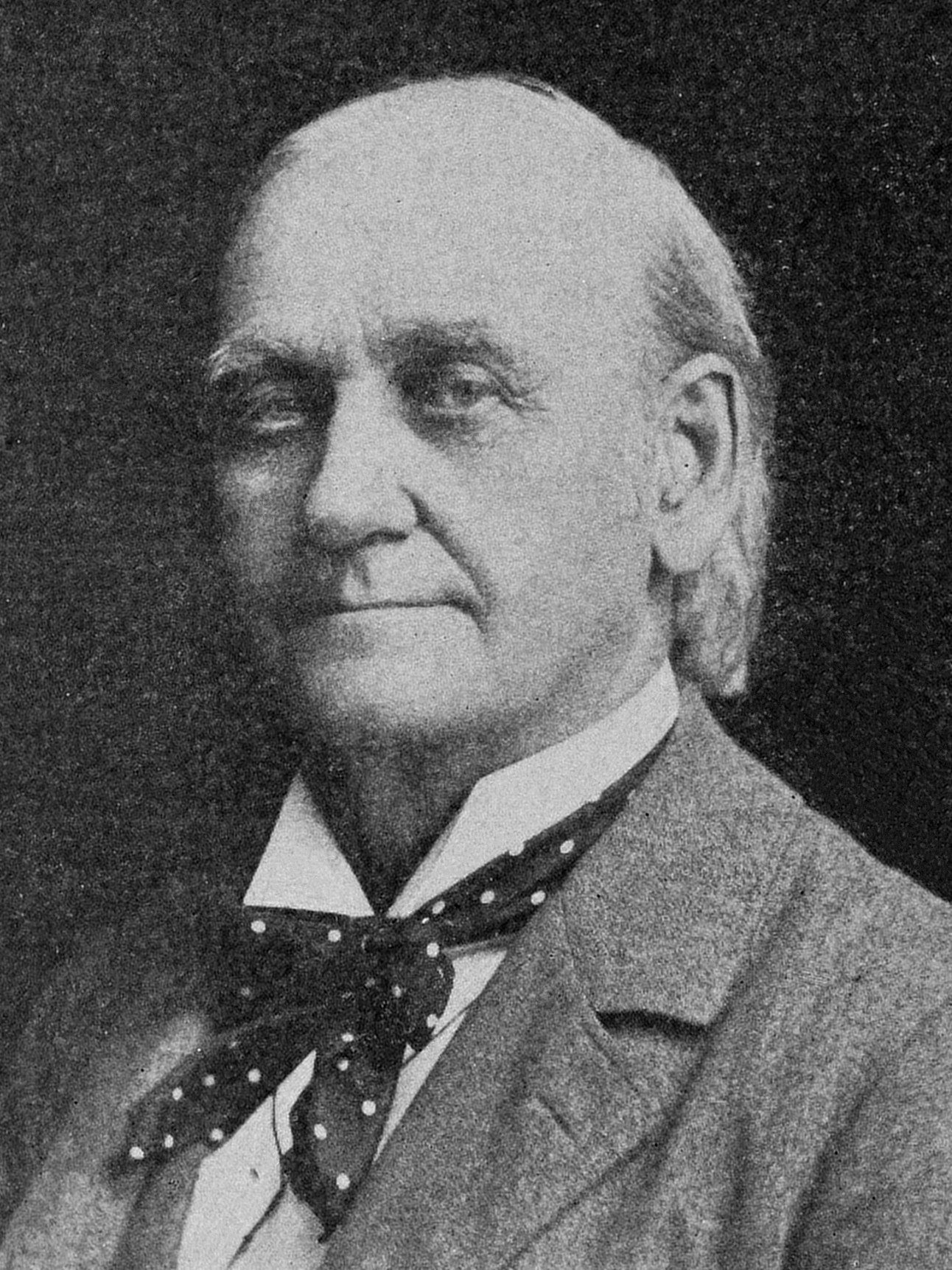

Justice of the Ohio Supreme Court
- In office December 8, 1883 – February 9, 1889
- Preceded by: William H. Upson
- Succeeded by: Joseph Perry Bradbury

Personal details
- Born: July 5, 1836 Steuben County, New York
- Died: October 1, 1916 (aged 80) Portland, Oregon
- Party: Democratic
- Spouse: Beulah B. Barrett
- Education: Antioch College; Cincinnati Law School

Selwyn N. Owen (July 5, 1836 – October 1, 1916) was a Democratic lawyer in the U.S. State of Ohio who was a judge on the Ohio Supreme Court 1883–1889.

Selwyn N. Owen was born at Steuben County, New York, before his family moved to Columbus, Ohio, and then Huron County, Ohio in 1837. He attended school in Norwich Township, and Norwalk Academy. He attended Antioch College until 1856, and then was principal of a seminary in Clark County, Kentucky. He returned to Norwalk in 1857, where he read law in the offices of Cortland Kennon and Gideon T. Stewart. He enrolled in Cincinnati Law School in 1861, and graduated in 1862.

Selwyn N. Owen was admitted to the bar in 1862 and began practice in Fremont, Ohio. In 1863 he moved to Bryan, Ohio, where he had a large practice. In 1876, he was elected to the Common Pleas bench, and was re-elected in 1881.

In 1883, he was nominated by the Democrats for an Ohio Supreme Court seat, and defeated Republican John H. Doyle. William H. Upson resigned December of that year, and Owen was appointed to fill the vacancy. He began his five-year term in February 1884, serving until February 1889. In the 1888 election, the Democrats nominated Lyman R. Critchfield, who lost.

Owen entered into private practice with the firm Powell, Owen, Ricketts and Black when his Supreme judgeship ended. In 1897, he was appointed Director of Law of the city of Columbus by Mayor Samuel Luccock Black, his old law partner, and served two years. In 1899, Ohio Governor Bushnell appointed Owen to the Ohio State Board of Arbitration, and he was re-appointed in 1905 by Governor Myron T. Herrick. He declined appointment from Judson Harmon to a third term, and resigned January 3, 1911.

Owen married Beulah B. Barrett of Rochelle, Illinois in 1870. He owned a large home in Bryan and a 75-acre farm near the city as well as a home in Columbus. He was a Mason and a member of the Universalist Church. Two years after retirement, he and his wife moved to Portland, Oregon, to be near their daughter, and he died there.

== Notes ==
Justices of the Ohio Supreme Court 1883–1889					1883	William White; 2/10/1864-3/12/1883	Nicholas Longworth II; 11/1881-3/9/1883	John W. Okey; 2/9/1878-7/25/1885	George W. McIlvaine; 2/9/1871-2/1886	William Wartenbee Johnson; 2/1880-11/1886																							
William H. Upson; 3/14/1883-12/1883	John H. Doyle; 3/10/1883-12/1883				1883			John W. Okey; 2/9/1878-7/25/1885	George W. McIlvaine; 2/9/1871-2/1886	William Wartenbee Johnson; 2/1880-11/1886																							
Selwyn N. Owen; 12/1883-2/9/1889	Martin Dewey Follett; 12/1883-2/9/1887	1884	Selwyn N. Owen	Martin Dewey Follett	1883	John W. Okey	George W. McIlvaine	John W. Okey; 2/9/1878-7/25/1885	George W. McIlvaine; 2/9/1871-2/1886	William Wartenbee Johnson; 2/1880-11/1886	William Wartenbee Johnson	1885	Selwyn N. Owen	Martin Dewey Follett	John W. Okey	George W. McIlvaine	William Wartenbee Johnson	Gibson Atherton; 8/18/1885-12/18/1885															
William T. Spear; 12/16/1885-12/31/1912	1886	Selwyn N. Owen	Martin Dewey Follett	William T. Spear	George W. McIlvaine	William Wartenbee Johnson	Thaddeus A. Minshall; 2/9/1886-2/1902	Franklin J. Dickman; 11/10/1886-2/1895	1887	Selwyn N. Owen	Martin Dewey Follett	1885	Selwyn N. Owen	Martin Dewey Follett	William T. Spear	George W. McIlvaine	William Wartenbee Johnson	Thaddeus A. Minshall	Franklin J. Dickman	Marshall Jay Williams; 2/1887-7/7/1902	1888	Selwyn N. Owen	Marshall Jay Williams	William T. Spear	Thaddeus A. Minshall	Franklin J. Dickman	1889	Selwyn N. Owen	Marshall Jay Williams	William T. Spear	Thaddeus A. Minshall	Franklin J. Dickman	Joseph Perry Bradbury; 2/9/1889-1/10/1900
