= Maria Longworth Storer =

American potter and businesswoman (1849–1932)

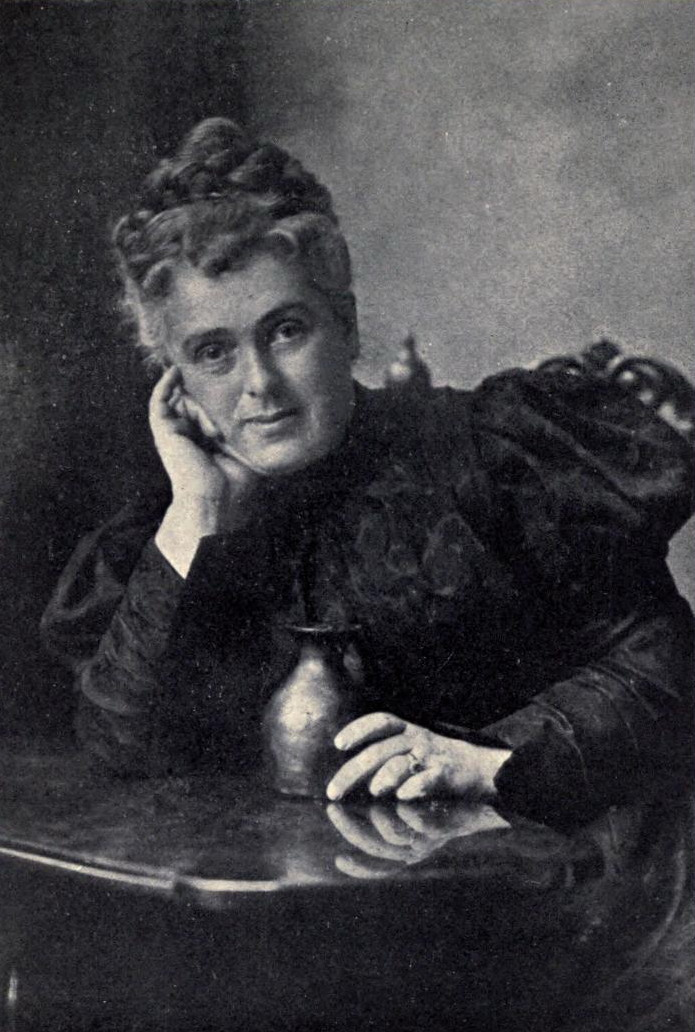
- Born: Maria Longworth; March 20, 1849 (United States) Cincinnati, Ohio, USA
- Died: April 30, 1932 (aged 83)
- Notable work: Rookwood Pottery
- Movement: Ceramics

Maria Longworth Nichols Storer (March 20, 1849 – April 30, 1932) was the founder of Rookwood Pottery of Cincinnati, Ohio, United States, a patron of fine art and the granddaughter of the wealthy Cincinnati businessman Nicholas Longworth (patriarch of the famous Longworth family).

== Biography ==
She was born Maria Longworth, daughter of Joseph H. Longworth, in Cincinnati, Ohio into perhaps the wealthiest Episcopalian family in the city of that time. Due to her comfortable upbringing, she was immersed in the fine arts at a young age and picked up hobbies like playing piano and painting.

She married the American Civil War veteran Colonel George Ward Nichols in 1868, who had been hired by her family to catalog their vast collections of artwork. Nichols was eighteen years her elder. In 1871, she was responsible for planning and raising money for the now annually celebrated Cincinnati May Festival, making her the first female in history to found a music festival in the United States. The first festival was not held until 1873, the same year she began painting china under the instruction of German immigrant and ceramic chemist Karl Langenbeck.

She enrolled as a student at the McMicken School of Drawing and Design, later the Art Academy of Cincinnati, that following year. She began classes in china-painting from instructor, Benn Pittman. The students' work was on display in the Women's Pavilion at the 1876 Centennial Exhibition.

She attended the 1876 Centennial Exposition held in Philadelphia, Pennsylvania, the first World's fair held in the United States. By now well along in her skill as a ceramics painter, she returned home to Cincinnati with an appreciation for Japanese art and began incorporating some of those elements into her own work.

=== Rookwood Pottery ===
In 1879, along with her fellow ceramics painter Mary Louise McLaughlin, Nichols commissioned the creation of an under-glaze and over-glaze kiln at a local pottery shop in Cincinnati. Nichols was also having pieces of pottery created to her specifications locally, then painting them decoratively. The following year, Nichols founded the now famous Rookwood Pottery, the first woman from Cincinnati to own such a shop. Soon she employed a modest staff consisting of both men and women, including a potter and chemist named Joseph Bailey and, as her general assistant and a china decorator, Clara Chipman Newton. She encouraged her team to be creative, use new mediums and subjects to create fine art. American pottery was considered unrefined and Maria was trying to change this perspective.

One of the first pieces made was the Aladdin Vase, a large vase whose dragon and catfish motifs were inspired by Japanese art. The dragon is modeled in low relief crawling around the neck of the vase, with one of its claws hooked into the vase's opening. Nichols made the vase in 1882 in response to an earlier piece by her rival McLaughlin, the Ali Baba Vase, which was then the largest underglaze-decorated vase in America. Although not as tall as the Ali Baba Vase, the Aladdin Vase is wider, a technically more difficult feat.

That same year, Nichols won a gold medal at the Tenth Cincinnati Industrial Exposition for some of her works. In 1885 George Nichols died, and by March of the following year she was remarried to a lawyer named Bellamy Storer. In the wake of her first husband's death, Storer's output had lessened considerably. In 1889 she won a gold medal at the Paris Exposition, and that same year she handed her small company over to William W. Taylor (who incorporated the small factory).

The Rookwood Pottery Company is still around today. The company continues produce artisan products. The assets of the company include master molds, secret glaze formulas, notes, and the Rookwood trademark which were purchased and the company was revived by Dr. Art Townley. Dr. Townley and other investors have kept the company in the company's birthplace.

=== Later years ===
From 1891 to 95, Bellamy Storer was a member of the United States Congress, who became foreign minister for the United States to Belgium from 1897 to 1898. In 1896 the couple became Roman Catholics due to the recommendation of Archbishop John Ireland.

In 1900, still involved with the arts, she won a gold medal at the Universelle Exposition for her paintings on bronze mediums. In 1899 Bellamy Storer became the foreign minister of Spain, and the two convinced President William McKinley to petition Pope Leo XIII to make Archbishop Ireland a Cardinal (with the help of New York governor Theodore Roosevelt).

The following year McKinley arranged for a visit with the Pope and authorized the couple to mention John Ireland for consideration. In 1902, when Roosevelt was president, he made Bellamy minister to Austria-Hungary and did not wish to involve himself in advocating for Archbishop Ireland. However, Maria continued to press the issue by meeting with members of the Vatican and leaving false impressions with others that Roosevelt backed such sentiments. These events led to the removal of Bellamy as minister, the news of which was rather scandalous at the time. Ironically, Maria's nephew, Nicholas Longworth III, came to marry Roosevelt's daughter Alice later, and Storer refused to attend the wedding.

== Gallery ==
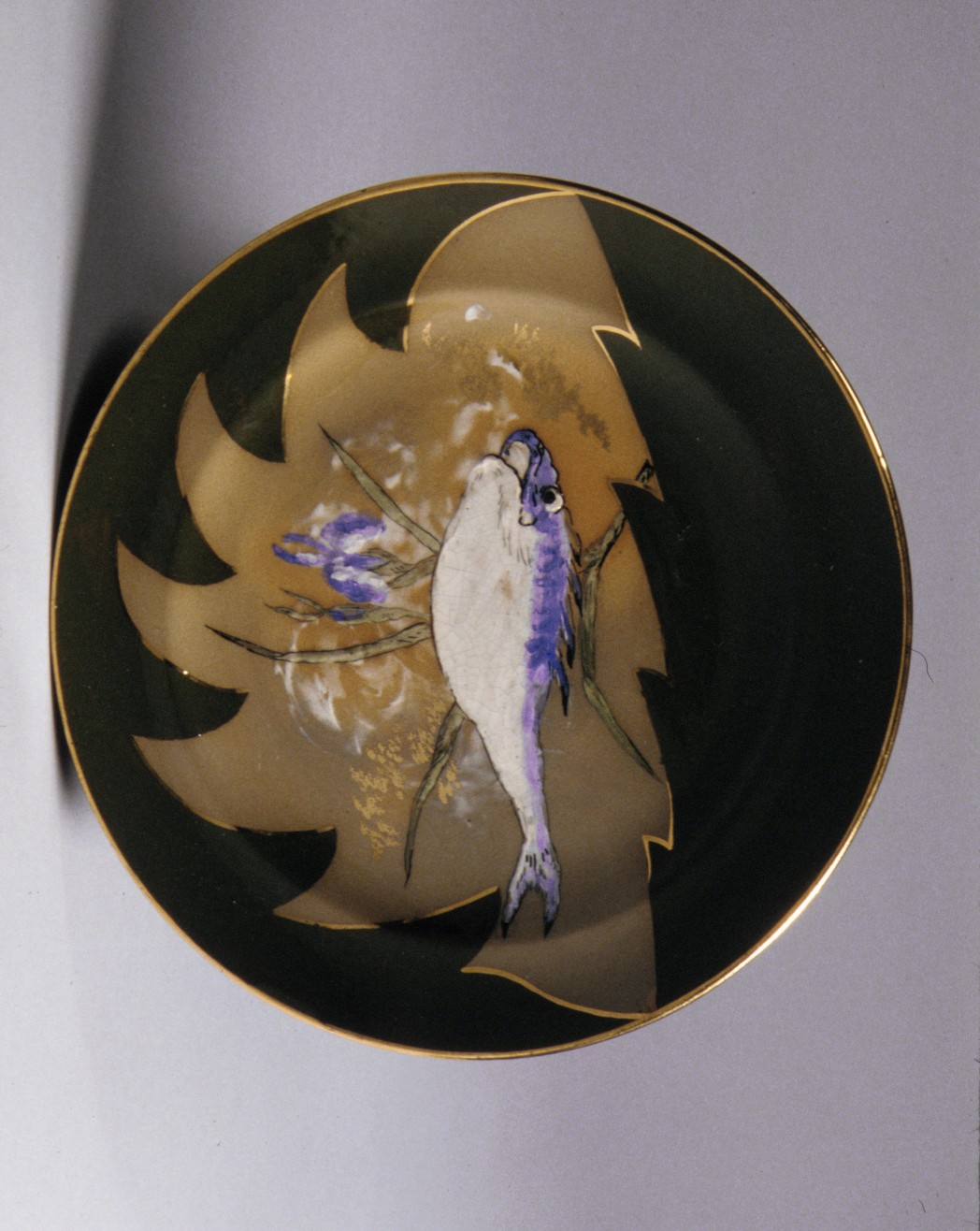
Plate, painted and glazed earthenware, ca. 1880

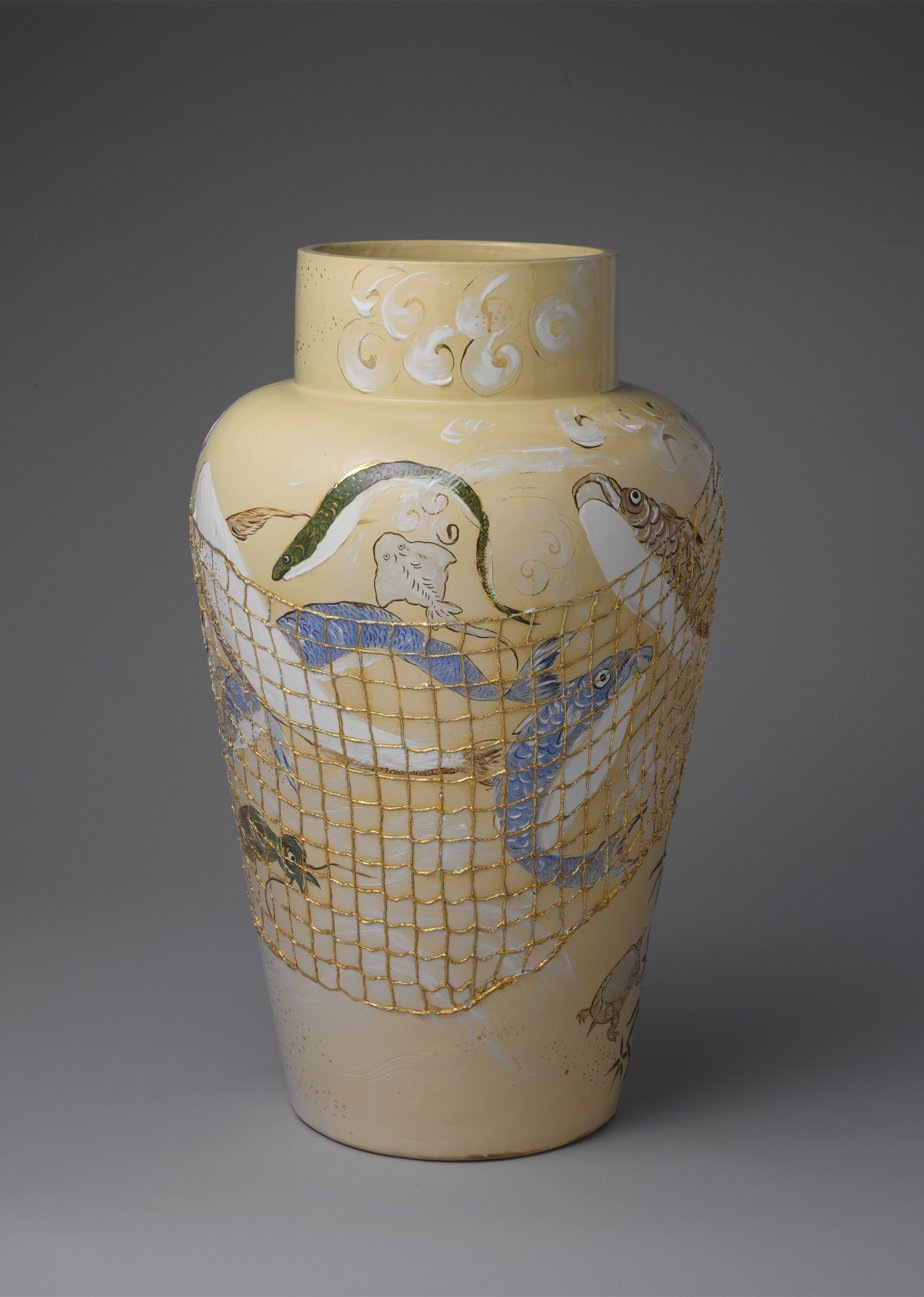
Aladdin Vase, earthenware, 1880–83

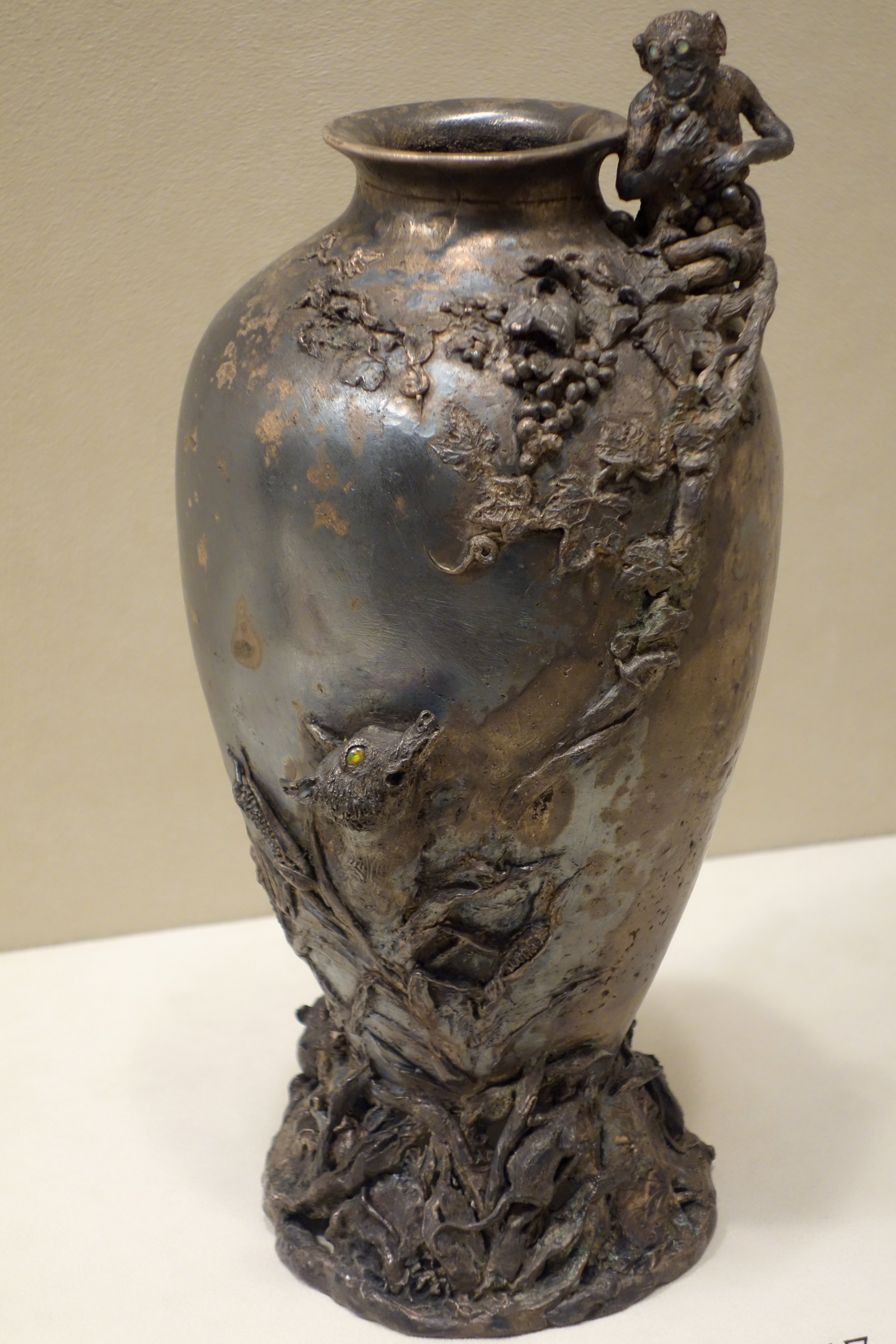
Vase, copper and silver electroplated on tin and semiprecious stones, 1898

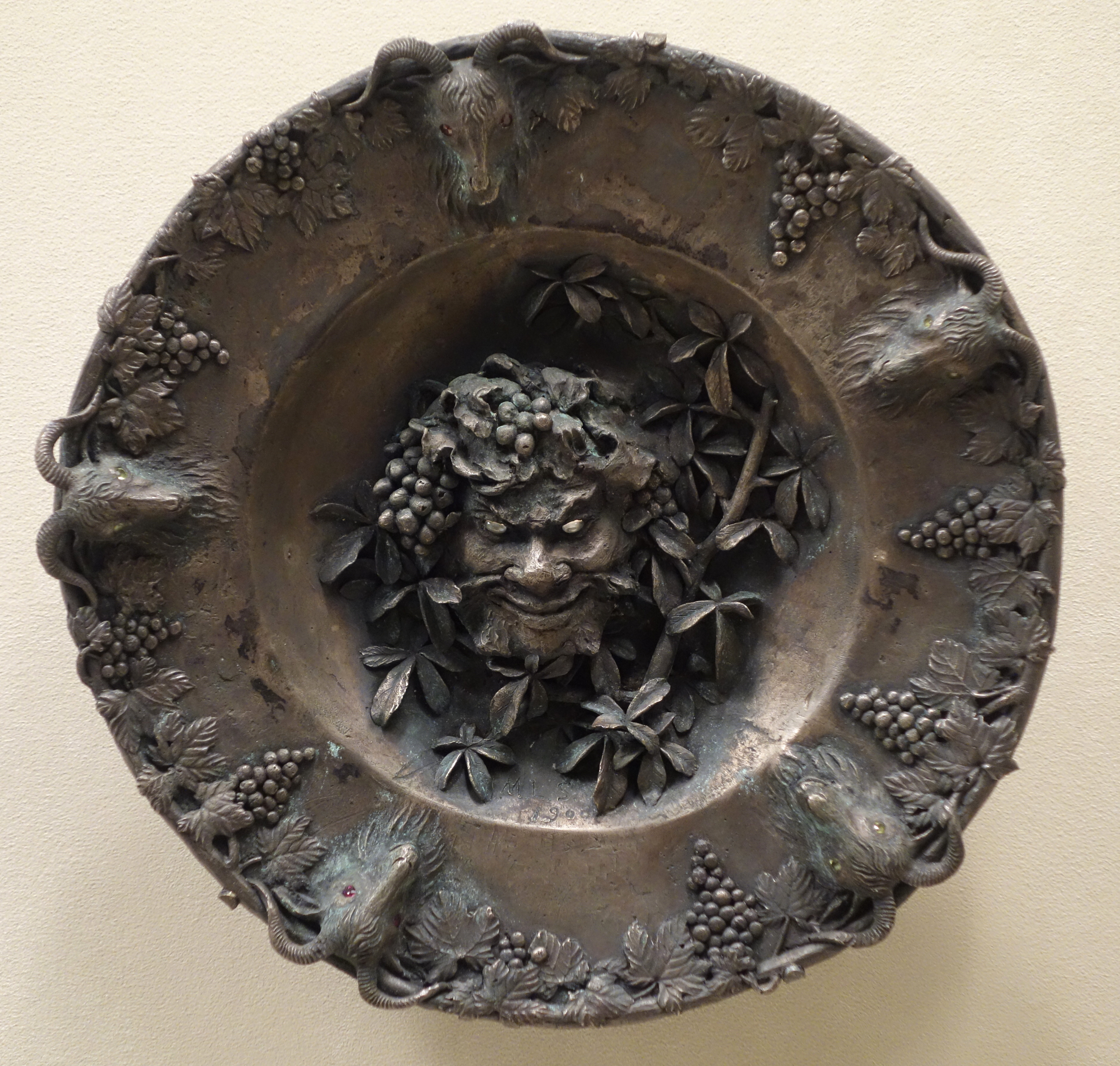
Plaque, copper and silver electroplated on tin and semiprecious stones, 1900
