= John H. Doyle =

American judge

John Hardy Doyle
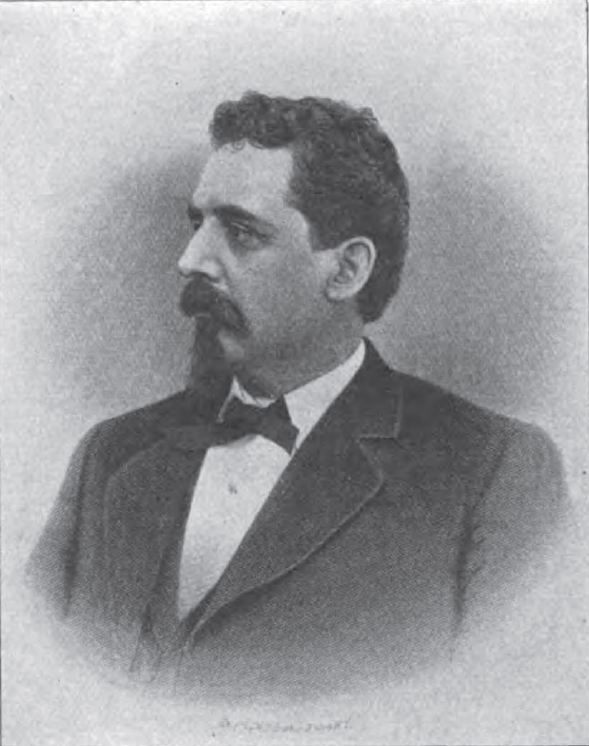

Associate Justice of the Ohio Supreme Court
- In office March 10, 1883 – December 1883
- Appointed by: Charles Foster
- Preceded by: Nicholas Longworth II
- Succeeded by: Martin Dewey Follett

Personal details
- Born: April 23, 1844 Perry County, Ohio
- Died: March 24, 1919 (aged 74) Florida
- Resting place: Woodlawn Cemetery
- Party: Republican
- Spouse: Alice Fuller Skinner
- Children: three
- Education: Denison University
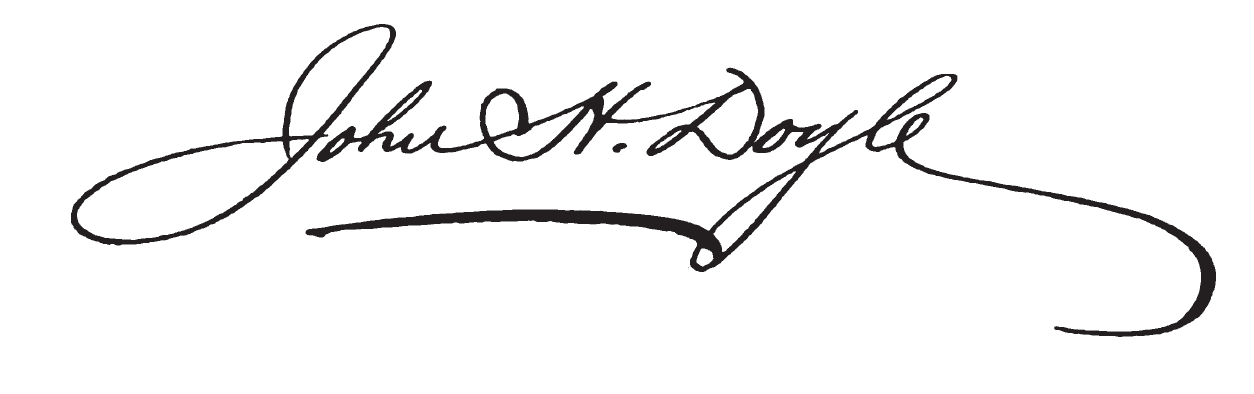
- Signature

John Hardy Doyle (April 23, 1844 – March 24, 1919) was a Republican politician in the U.S. State of Ohio who was an Ohio Supreme Court Judge during 1883.

== Biography ==
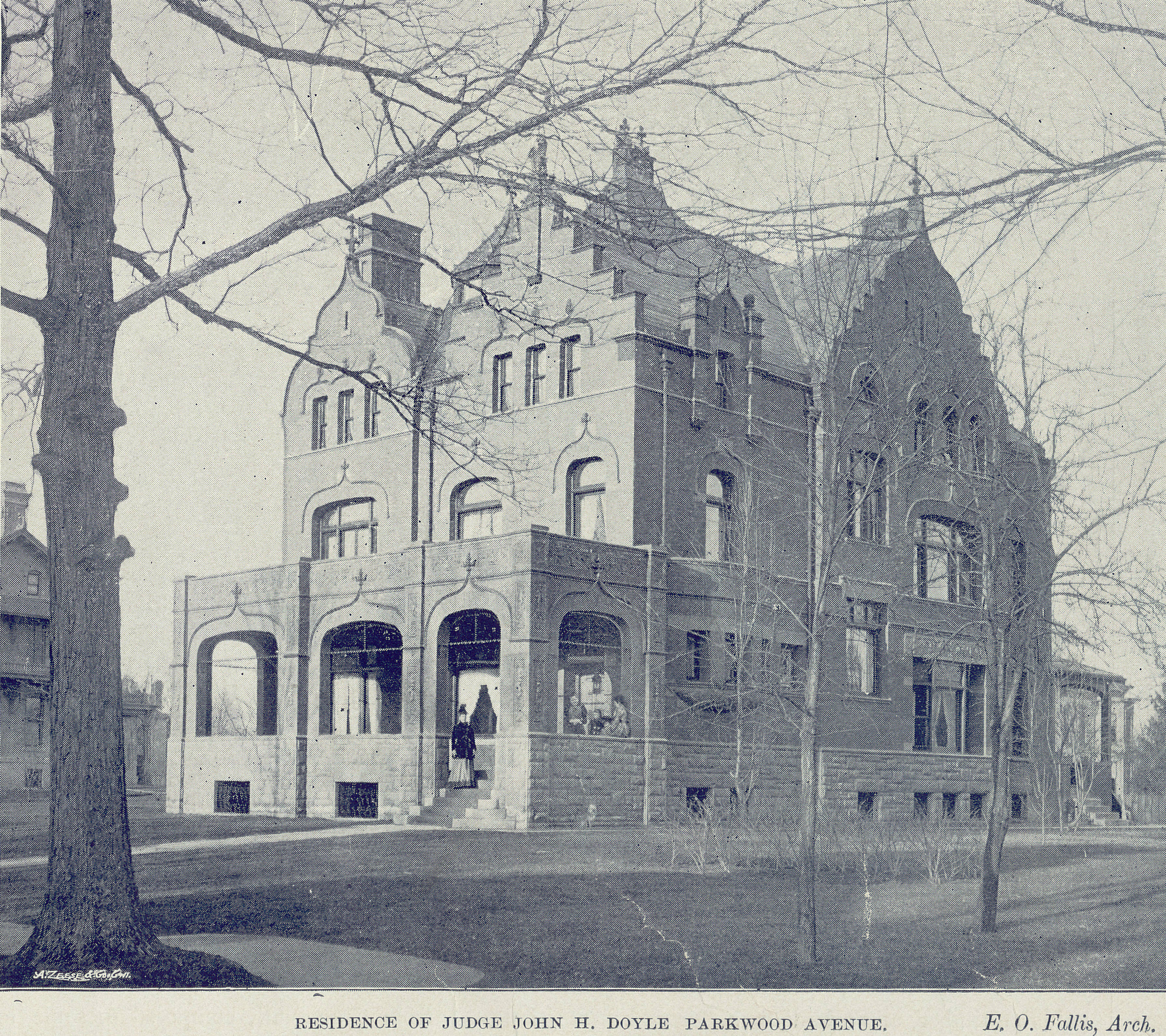
John H. Doyle's residence in Toledo, Ohio

John Doyle was born in Perry County, Ohio, and lived in Toledo, Ohio from 1847 until his death. He was educated in the Toledo Public Schools and for a short time at Denison University of Granville. During the winter of 1862–1863, he intended to enter the 67th Ohio Infantry, but was stricken with typhoid fever, and unable to pursue military service. He began study of law with Henry S. Commager, and continued with Edward Bissel. He was admitted to the bar on his 21st birthday, and entered partnership with Bissel.

In 1879, Doyle was elected, as a Republican, judge of the Common Pleas Court for the district of Lucas, Sandusky, Ottawa, Huron and Erie Counties. In 1882, he was nominated for the Ohio Supreme Court by the Republicans, but lost to Democrat John W. Okey that autumn.

In February, 1883, Governor Foster appointed Doyle to fill the vacancy on the Supreme Court caused by the resignation of Nicholas Longworth II. He was nominated again that year, but lost to Democrat Selwyn N. Owen, and resigned his seat in December 1883.

Doyle returned to private practice in Toledo. Presidents William Howard Taft and William McKinley each offered him the position Judge of the United States District Court for the Northern District of Ohio, which he twice declined. He was president of the American Bar Association 1889–1890, and president of the Ohio Bar Association, 1893. He also lectured on constitutional law at St. John's Law School at Toledo.

Doyle was married October 6, 1868 to Alice Fuller Skinner from Windsor, Connecticut, a descendant of Roger Wolcott and Oliver Wolcott, and had three daughters. Doyle died March 24, 1919. He died in Florida. He is interred in Woodlawn Cemetery (Toledo, Ohio).

== Publications ==
- Doyle, John H. (1919). A story of early Toledo: historical facts and incidents of the early days of the City and its Environs. Bowling Green, Ohio: C. S. Van Tassel.

== See also ==
- List of justices of the Ohio Supreme Court

== Notes ==
Legal offices
Preceded by Samuel Furman Hunt	President of the Ohio State Bar Association; 1892	Succeeded by Stephen Ross Harris
