= Theodore Sommers Henderson =

American Episcopal bishop

Theodore Sommers Henderson (May 14, 1868 – February 11, 1929) was an American bishop of the Methodist Episcopal Church, elected in 1912.

Born in Millburn, New Jersey, he joined the New York East Annual Conference of the M.E. Church in 1893. Prior to his election to the episcopacy, he served as a pastor and as the secretary of Evangelism of the M.E. Church

As bishop he was assigned the Cincinnati Episcopal Area, making many episcopal visits throughout this area (which included Ohio and Kentucky). Among these visits was one to the LeRoy Methodist Episcopal Church in LeRoy, Ohio (now Westfield Center, Ohio) in 1923 for the dedication of their new church building.

Bishop Henderson died 11 February 1929 in Cincinnati, Ohio. He was buried in Spring Grove Cemetery in Cincinnati.

== Selected writings ==
- Methodism's Minimum Goal, New England Methodism, E.C.E. Dorion, Editor, 1915.
- Address: Book of Devotions, 1916.
- Decision Day, pamphlet, 36 pp., n.d.
- Booklets: Building an Evangelistic Church, The Fellowship of Redemption.

== See also ==
- List of bishops of the United Methodist Church
