= Longworth family =

Family associated with Ohio

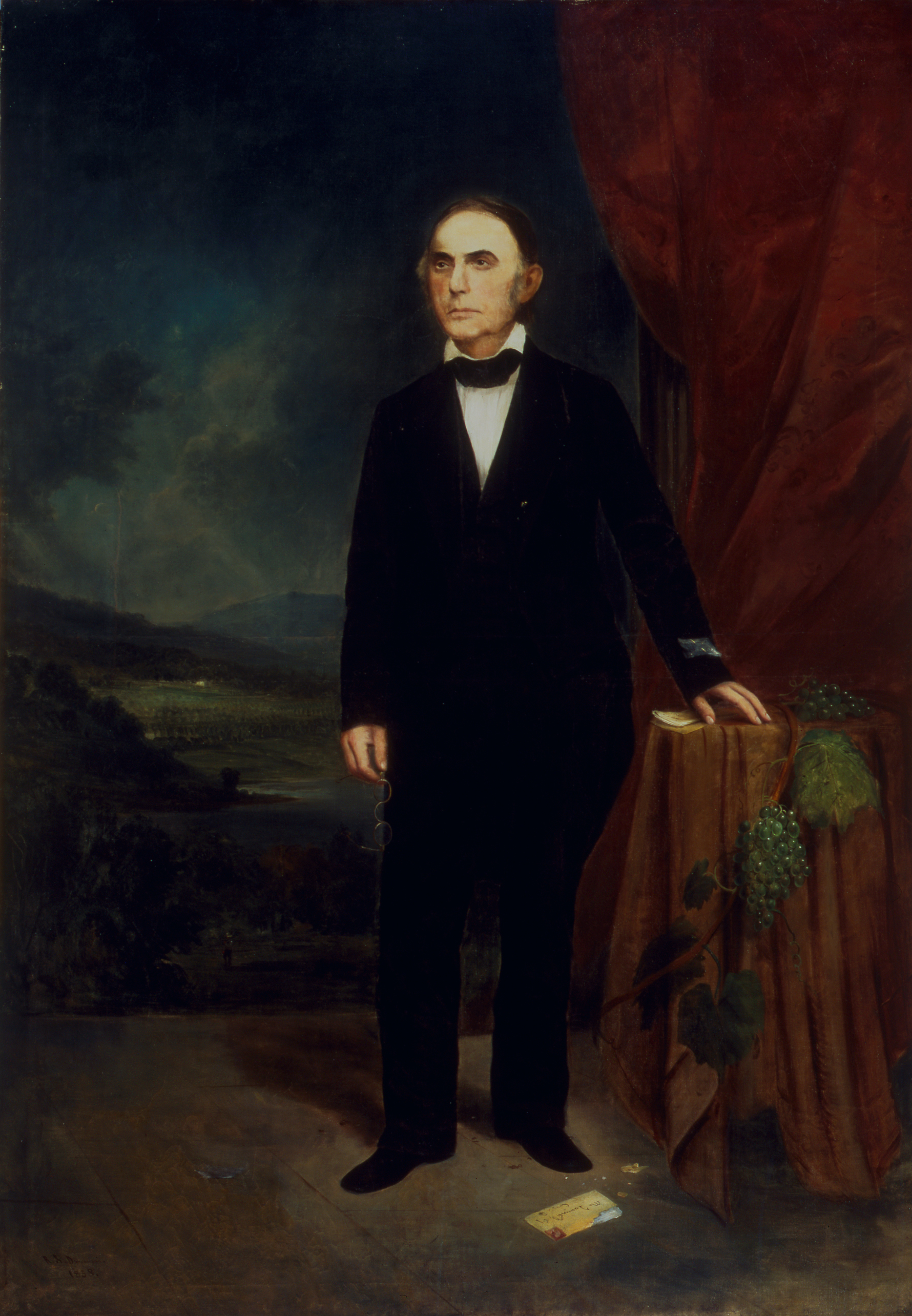
Nicholas Longworth, patriarch of the Longworth family; painted by Robert S. Duncanson

The Longworth family is most closely associated with Cincinnati, Ohio, and was one of Cincinnati's better-known families during the 19th and 20th centuries. The founder of the Ohio family, Nicholas Longworth (16 January 1783 – 10 February 1863), came to Cincinnati from Newark, New Jersey, sometime before 1808. He married Susanna Howell, three years his junior, daughter of Silas and Hannah (Vaughan) Howell, on Christmas Eve, 1807.

Nicholas Longworth was a winemaker who has been called the "Father of the American wine industry". He capitalized on the German-American movement into Cincinnati, producing a wine that replicated a drink native to Germany. During the late 1840s and throughout the 1850s, the family patriarch's wine ventures were increasingly profitable. However, the root of the Longworth family wealth was Longworth's real estate success.

He and his wife Susanna had five children:

- Mary Longworth (7 October 1808 – 4 January 1886)
- Eliza Longworth (9 December 1809 – 1891)
- Sarah Longworth (21 October 1811 – 14 September 1812)
- Joseph Longworth (2 October 1813 – 30 December 1883)
- Catherine Longworth (22 October 1815 – 20 June 1893)

Oldest daughter Mary married John Stettinius, and was the matriarch of the Cincinnati family of that name. But the Longworth fame continued on through the second-youngest child and only son, Joseph.

On 13 April 1841, Joseph Longworth married Anna Maria Rives. His wife was the daughter of Landon Cabell Rives and Anna Maria Towles. Longworth's in-laws were a fairly well known central Virginia family, and Landon Cabell Rives was a doctor who studied medicine at the University of Pennsylvania. Anna, her sister Margaret, and brother Landon Jr. were born in Nelson County, Virginia, and had come to Cincinnati with their parents in 1829. Their uncle was the American ambassador to France, United States senator and member of the Confederate Senate, William Cabell Rives.

Joseph and Anna Maria (Rives) Longworth had a few descendants of note. Their daughter Maria Longworth Nichols Storer founded Rookwood Pottery in Cincinnati, named for the Grandin Road home of the Longworth family on the east side of Cincinnati (the house was so called because loud rooks – blackbirds of the family corvidae – constantly hovered around the place). Their son Nicholas Longworth II was a justice on the Ohio Supreme Court.

His son, Nicholas Longworth III (1869-1931), was an important Republican politician in the early 20th century. After serving on the Cincinnati Board of Education (1898), the Ohio House of Representatives (1899–1900) and the State Senate (1901–1903) he was first elected to the United States House of Representatives in 1902, retaining his seat from 1903 until his death with the sole loss of the 1912 election, regaining it two years later. In 1923 he became House Majority Leader, and in 1925 was elected speaker. A bachelor when he entered Congress, he married Alice Roosevelt, the daughter of President Theodore Roosevelt, on February 17, 1906, in a White House wedding that received widespread public attention. The Longworth House Office Building in Washington, D.C. was named in his honor. His sister Clara Longworth de Chambrun wrote about her brother and the larger family in a book called The Making of Nicholas Longworth: Annals of an American Family.
