= William H. Upson =

American politician and lawyer (1823–1910)

William Hanford Upson
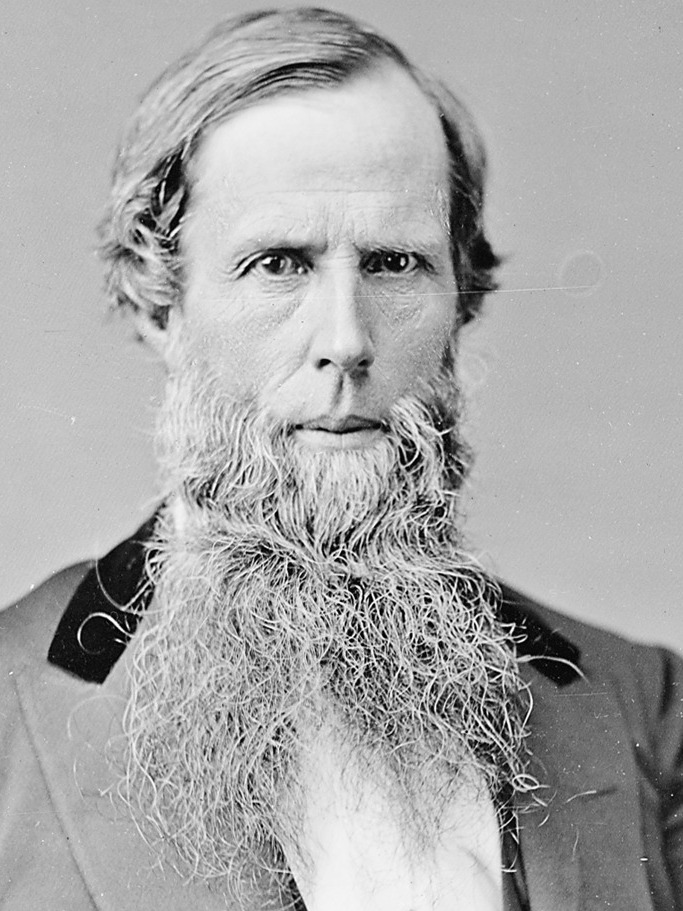

Member of the U.S. House of Representatives from Ohio's 18th district
- In office March 4, 1869 – March 3, 1873
- Preceded by: Rufus P. Spalding
- Succeeded by: James Monroe

Associate Justice of the Ohio Supreme Court
- In office March 14, 1883 – December 8, 1883
- Appointed by: Charles Foster
- Preceded by: William White
- Succeeded by: Selwyn N. Owen

Member of the Ohio Senate from the 26th district
- In office January 2, 1854 – January 6, 1856
- Preceded by: Ransom A. Gillett
- Succeeded by: O. P. Brown

Personal details
- Born: January 11, 1823 Worthington, Ohio, US
- Died: April 13, 1910 (aged 87) Akron, Ohio, US
- Party: Republican
- Spouse: Julia A. Ford
- Children: four
- Education: Western Reserve College; Yale Law School
- Profession: Politician, Lawyer, Judge

William Hanford Upson (January 11, 1823 – April 13, 1910) was a nineteenth-century politician, lawyer and judge from Ohio. From 1869 to 1873, he served two terms in the U.S. House of Representatives

== Biography ==
Upson was born in Worthington, Ohio. His parents were Dr. Daniel Upson and Polly Wright. He attended Tallmadge Academy, pursued in classical studies and graduated from Western Reserve College in 1842. He studied law at the Painesville, Ohio office of Reuben Hitchcock, followed by a year at Yale Law School. He was admitted to the bar in 1845, commencing practice in Akron, Ohio in 1846. He served as prosecuting attorney of Summit County, Ohio from 1848 to 1850, was a member of the Ohio Senate from 1853 to 1855 and was a delegate to the Republican National Convention in 1864. Upson was elected a Republican to the United States House of Representatives in 1868, serving from 1869 to 1873, not being a candidate for renomination in 1872. There, he served as chairman of the Committee on Private Land Claims from 1871 to 1873. Afterward, he was once again a delegate to the Republican National Convention in 1876, was appointed an Associate Justice of the Ohio Supreme Court in 1883 and was elected judge of the circuit court of Ohio in 1884, serving until 1894. Upson continued practicing law until his death in Akron, Ohio on April 13, 1910. He was interred in Glendale Cemetery in Akron.

Upson was married May 20, 1856 to Julia A. Ford of Akron, and four children were born to them.

Upson was a trustee of Western Reserve College, Oberlin College, and the Lake Erie Female Seminary in Painesville.

U.S. House of Representatives
Preceded by Rufus P. Spalding	Member of the U.S. House of Representatives from Ohio's 18th congressional district March 4, 1869 – March 3, 1873	Succeeded by James Monroe
