= Nicholas Longworth =

American politician (1869–1931)

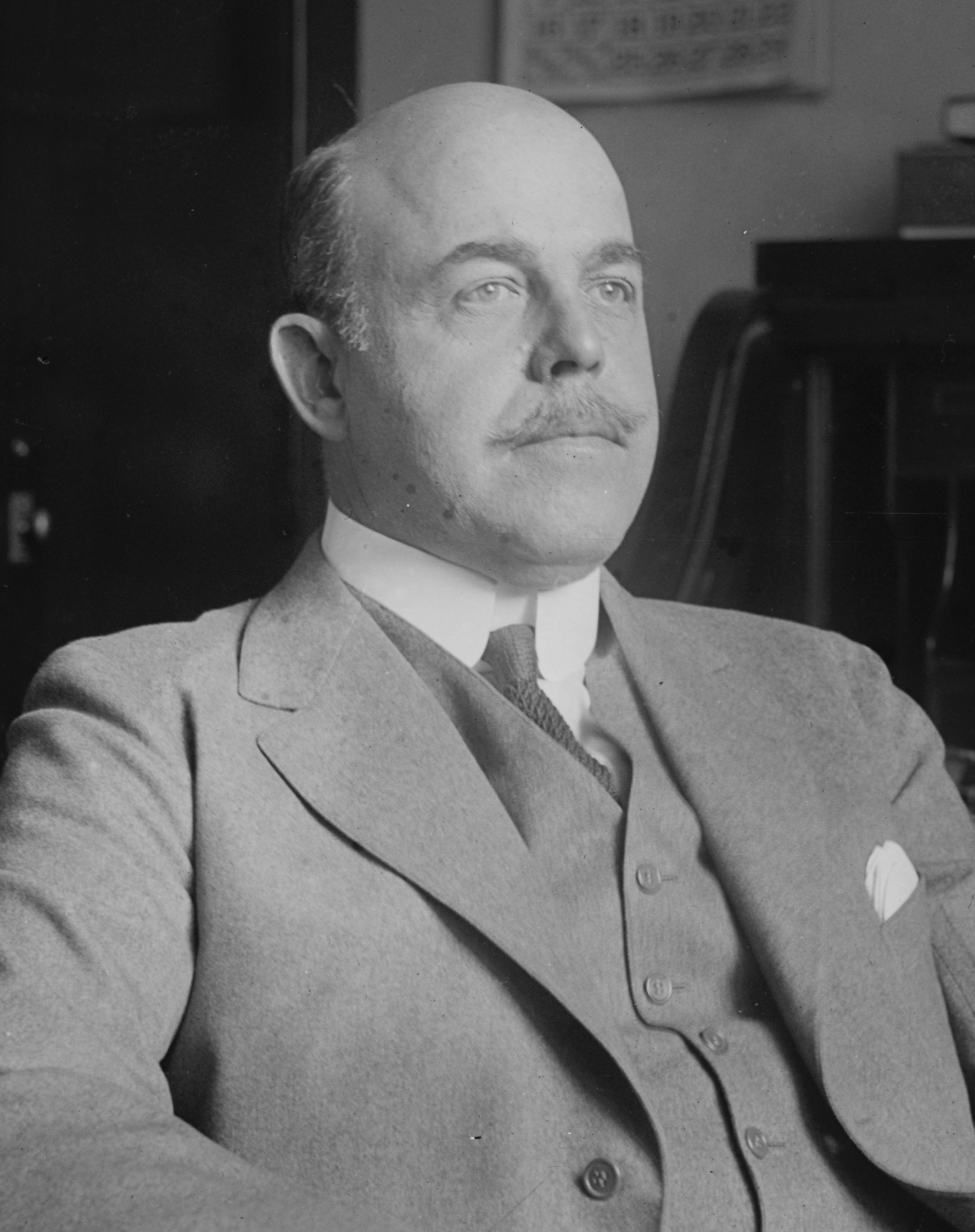
- Longworth in 1920

38th Speaker of the United States House of Representatives
- In office December 7, 1925 – March 3, 1931
- Preceded by: Frederick H. Gillett
- Succeeded by: John Nance Garner

Leader of the House Republican Conference
- In office December 7, 1925 – March 3, 1931
- Preceded by: Frederick H. Gillett
- Succeeded by: Bertrand Snell

House Majority Leader
- In office March 3, 1923 – December 7, 1925
- Speaker: Frederick H. Gillett
- Preceded by: Frank W. Mondell
- Succeeded by: John Q. Tilson

Member of the U.S. House of Representatives from Ohio's 1st district
- In office March 4, 1915 – April 9, 1931
- Preceded by: Stanley E. Bowdle
- Succeeded by: John B. Hollister
- In office March 4, 1903 – March 3, 1913
- Preceded by: William B. Shattuc
- Succeeded by: Stanley E. Bowdle

Member of the Ohio Senate from the 1st district
- In office 1901–1903

Member of the Ohio House of Representatives from Hamilton County
- In office 1899–1900

Personal details
- Born: Nicholas Longworth III; November 5, 1869 Mount Adams, Cincinnati, Ohio, U.S.
- Died: April 9, 1931 (aged 61) Aiken, South Carolina, U.S.
- Resting place: Spring Grove Cemetery
- Party: Republican
- Spouse: Alice Lee Roosevelt (m. 1906)
- Relations: Longworth family
- Parents: Nicholas Longworth II; Susan Walker
- Education: Harvard University; Cincinnati Law School
- Occupation: Politician
- Profession: Law

Nicholas Longworth III (November 5, 1869 – April 9, 1931) was an American lawyer and politician who became Speaker of the United States House of Representatives. A Republican, he was elected to the Ohio Senate, where he initiated the successful Longworth Act of 1902, regulating the issuance of municipal bonds. As congressman for Ohio's 1st congressional district, he soon became a popular social figure of Washington, and married President Theodore Roosevelt's daughter Alice Lee. Their relationship became strained when he opposed her father in the Republican Party split of 1912. Longworth became Majority Leader of the House in 1923, and Speaker from 1925 to 1931. In 1962, the Longworth House Office Building was named after him.

== Early years and education ==
Nicholas Longworth III was the son of Nicholas Longworth II and Susan Walker. The Longworth family was an old, prominent, and wealthy family which dominated Cincinnati, Ohio. He had two younger sisters, Anna and Clara. Nicholas Longworth II was a son of Joseph Longworth and grandson of winemaker Nicholas Longworth I, both distinguished citizens of Cincinnati.

Nicholas Longworth III attended the Franklin School, a school for boys in Cincinnati, and then went on to attend Harvard College (Class of 1891), where he was a member of Delta Kappa Epsilon (Alpha chapter) and the Porcellian Club. He was a talented, but not necessarily an industrious student; one friend wrote about him: "His good head made it easy for him to get perfectly respectable marks without doing much of any work." After receiving his bachelor's degree from Harvard, he attended Harvard Law School for one year, but transferred to and received his law degree from Cincinnati Law School in 1894.

Longworth was a violinist, and on their first visit to Bayreuth, his wife Alice Lee Roosevelt reported that "Nick was really a musician and cared deeply for music...." Later she observed that "In Washington, Nick never had much time to play his violin, and in those days there were very few people to play with him. In Cincinnati there were the orchestra, the College of Music, and the Conservatory to draw on, and soon we were having musical parties, at least once, and often two or three times a week. ... We would all have dinner first, the musicians and a few others who cared for music, and afterwards lose no time getting started, by about nine at the latest. From then on music and yet more music until midnight and usually long after." In a letter to Longworth's sister Clara, Leopold Stokowski wrote "Your brother had a rare understanding of music. He penetrated directly into the spirit of music. It was his natural element."

== Professional life and entry into politics ==
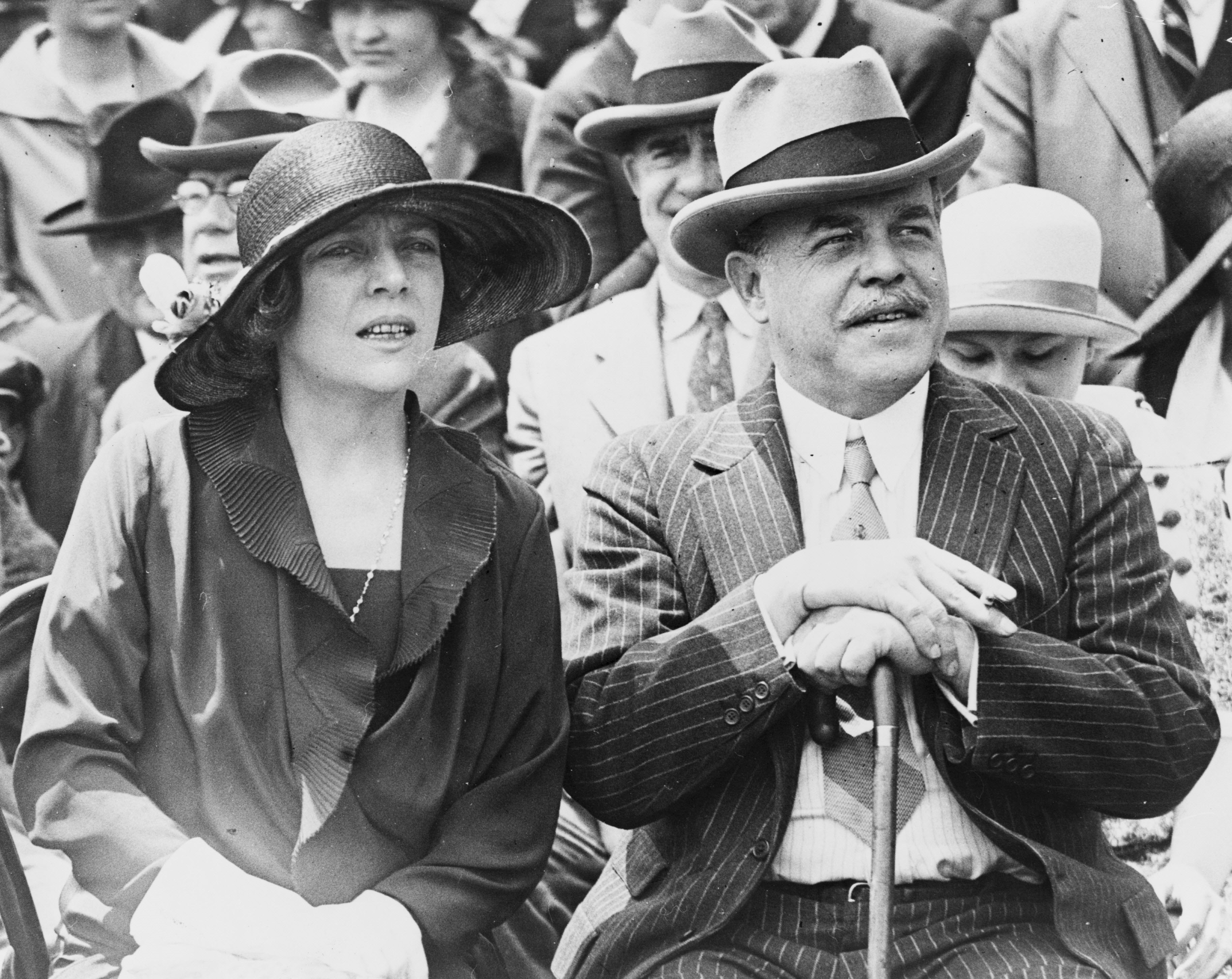
Nicholas Longworth and wife Alice seated outside the United States Capitol while watching a performance by Arizonan Native Americans, 1926.

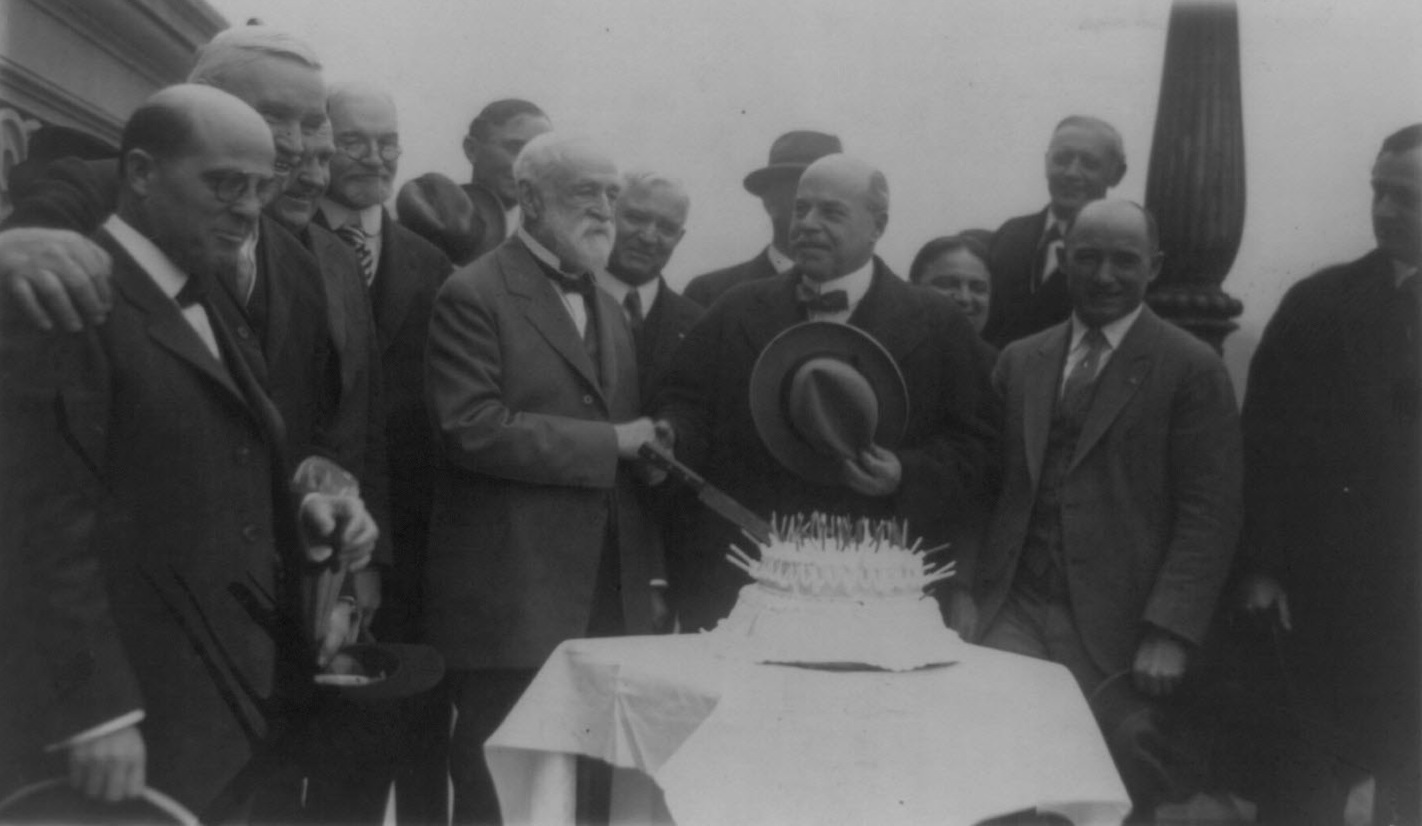
Speaker Longworth shakes hands with North Carolina Representative Charles Manly Stedman and presents a congressional birthday cake with eighty-five candles along with fellow congressmen in front of the United States Capitol, January 30, 1926.

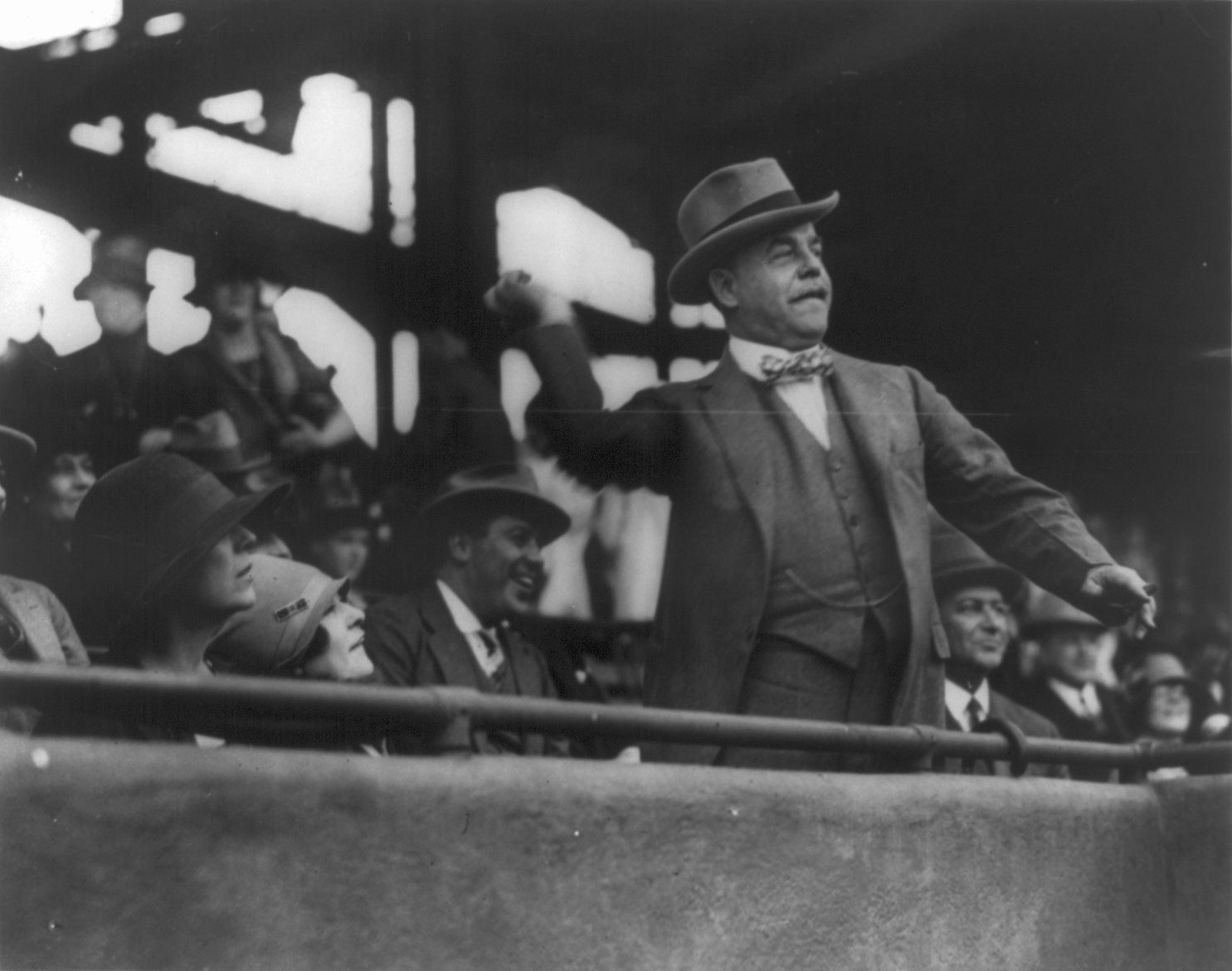
Speaker Longworth throws out the first ball at the starting Congressional Baseball Game between the Democratic and Republican teams of the House of Representatives at Griffith Stadium, Mrs. Longworth seated below, May 3, 1928.

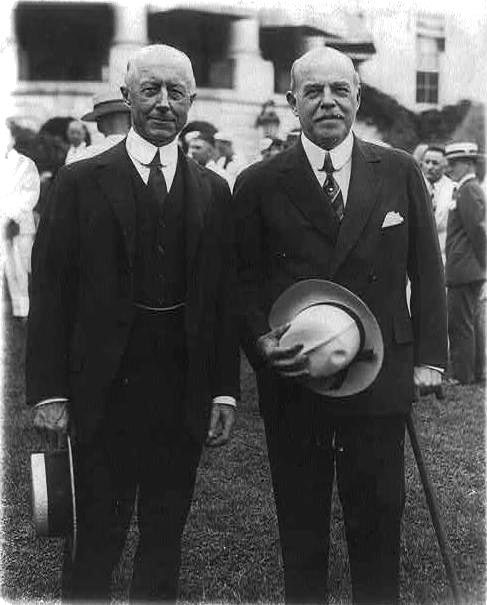
Speaker Longworth (right) with Secretary of the Navy Charles Francis Adams III on the White House lawn, June 27, 1929.

Longworth began a law practice in Cincinnati after being admitted to the Ohio bar in 1894. His political career began with a position on the city's Board of Education in 1898.

As the protégé of Republican boss George B. Cox, Longworth was elected to the Ohio General Assembly, serving in the Ohio House of Representatives in 1899 and 1900, then in the State Senate from 1901 to 1903. In 1902 he was instrumental in writing and passing the Longworth Act, a bill regulating the issuance of municipal bonds, which has been labeled "one of the most successful laws in Ohio's history." Longworth was elected to the United States House of Representatives from the First Congressional District of Ohio which included the city of Cincinnati and the surrounding counties.

Longworth, a bachelor when he entered Congress, married Alice Lee Roosevelt, the daughter of President Theodore Roosevelt, on February 17, 1906, in a White House wedding that received widespread public attention In 1925, Roosevelt gave birth to a daughter named Paulina Longworth, who was conceived from her affair with Senator William Borah. One family friend said of Paulina, "everybody called her 'Aurora Borah Alice.'" Biographers and historians have concluded that though Longworth was delighted with Paulina's birth and doted on her, he almost certainly knew that Borah was her father. Longworth also had affairs, but the couple remained married, though Alice's support for the progressive movement while Longworth sided with the conservative wing of the Republican Party caused a political rift between them.

Throughout his political career, Longworth championed issues regarding foreign affairs and the protective tariff. As the progressive Republicans pulled apart from the conservatives in 1910–12, Longworth sided with the conservatives. When they bolted from the party in the 1912 election to support Theodore Roosevelt and establish their own party, Longworth, along with many of Roosevelt's closest political allies, remained firmly behind Republican standard-bearer President William Howard Taft. Longworth agreed more with Taft than Roosevelt on critical issues like an independent judiciary and support for business. As a result of the Republican Party rift, Longworth and his wife Alice found themselves on opposite sides of the divide in the fall campaign. She actively supported her father's third-party presidential candidacy, even though her husband was running for reelection on the Republican ticket. Longworth narrowly lost his House seat to Democratic challenger Stanley E. Bowdle.

== Majority leader and Speaker of the House ==
Longworth returned to Congress in 1915, after defeating Bowdle in an election rematch, and served until his death in 1931. He became House Majority Leader in 1923, and rose to speaker in 1925, succeeding Frederick Gillett, who had been elected to the Senate.

Soon after becoming speaker, he set out to restore to the speakership many of the powers that had been stripped away during the revolt against Joseph Cannon. He also punished 13 progressives who supported Robert M. La Follette instead of Calvin Coolidge in the 1924 election. He expelled the rebels from the GOP caucus, and stripped even the committee chairmen among them of all seniority. Additionally, Longworth took control of the Steering Committee and Committee on Committees and placed his own men on the Rules Committee, guaranteeing that he controlled the work of the House.

Ignoring the progressive wing of the party, Longworth pursued legislation that aimed for balanced budgets and major tax reductions, resisting any new programs that would expand the role of government. However, Longworth defied President Herbert Hoover in 1931 by supporting the long-stalled veterans bonus bill; it passed but Hoover vetoed it, setting up the Bonus March of 1932.

Longworth reached across the aisle to Democrats, forging a productive relationship with John Nance Garner, that party's House minority leader, who relied upon informal methods to strengthen his party's influence. He enjoyed a close rapport with Garner, who said of Longworth, "I was the heathen and Nick was the aristocrat." Together they hosted a daily gathering of Democratic and Republican congressmen in a secluded room in the Capitol, which became known as the "Bureau of Education." This unofficial club provided a place for politicians to relax with a drink and get to know and work with one another across party lines.

== Final days and death ==
Longworth served as speaker until the end of the 71st Congress on March 4, 1931, and was speaker-presumptive for the upcoming 72nd Congress at the time of his death (as he had won reelection in November 1930 and as at the time Republicans retained a narrow 3-seat House majority). He died unexpectedly from pneumonia on April 9 while visiting his friend Dwight Filley Davis (of Davis Cup fame), and Daniel J. Duckett in Aiken, South Carolina. His body was subsequently interred at Spring Grove Cemetery in Cincinnati. At a memorial service held at the Library of Congress on May 3, 1931, his old friends Efrem Zimbalist and Harold Bauer played Brahms's D minor sonata.

== Character ==
Donald C. Bacon described Longworth as "Debonair and aristocratic, given to wearing spats and carrying a gold-headed cane. He was perpetually cheerful, quick with a joke or witty retort, and unfailingly friendly. He seemed never to have a care and made hard decisions with such ease and detachment that some people wondered if anything at all really mattered to him."

One particular famous retort is attributed to Longworth. One day, while he was lounging in a chair at the Capitol, another member of the House ran his hand over Longworth's bald pate and commented, "Nice and smooth. Feels just like my wife's bottom." Longworth felt his own head and said: "Yes, so it does."

Journalist Frank R. Kent of The Baltimore Sun wrote of him:

Without any revision of the rules he completely recovered the power of the speakership and was the undisputed leader of the House with as autocratic control as either Reed or Cannon. It is true he exercised this power with infinitely more tact and grace and gumption and without that touch of offensive arrogance that characterized former House Czars. But he was just as much a Czar. What Mr. Longworth clearly proved was this matter of leadership depends not so much on the rules but on the man.

== See also ==
- List of members of the United States Congress who died in office (1900–1949)
- Honors: In 1962, the Longworth House Office Building was named in honor of Nicholas Longworth of Ohio, who served as Speaker of the House of Representatives (1925–1931) when the building was authorized.

== Sources ==
- Garraty, John A; Carnes, Mark C., eds. (1999). "Longworth, Nicholas". American National Biography. Vol. 13. New York: Oxford University Press.
- Bacon, Donald C. (1998). "Nicholas Longworth: The Genial Czar". In Smock, Raymond W; Hammond, Susan W (eds.). Masters of the House: Congressional Leadership Over Two Centuries. pp. 119–143.
- De Chambrun, Clara Longworth (1933). The Making of Nicholas Longworth; Annals of an American Family. New York: Ray Long and Richard R. Smith, Inc. Reprint, Freeport, N.Y.: Books for Libraries Press, [1971]
- Longworth, Alice Roosevelt (1933). Crowded Hours; Reminiscences. New York: Scribner's.

U.S. House of Representatives
Preceded by William B. Shattuc	Member of the U.S. House of Representatives from Ohio's 1st congressional district 1903-1913	Succeeded by Stanley E. Bowdle
Preceded by Stanley E. Bowdle	Member of the U.S. House of Representatives from Ohio's 1st congressional district 1915-1931	Succeeded by John B. Hollister
Preceded by Frank W. Mondell; Wyoming	House Majority Leader; 1923–1925	Succeeded by John Q. Tilson; Connecticut
Preceded by Frederick H. Gillett	Speaker of the U.S. House of Representatives; December 7, 1925 – March 4, 1927; December 5, 1927 – March 4, 1929; April 15, 1929 – March 4, 1931	Succeeded by John Nance Garner IV
Awards and achievements
Preceded by Amy Lowell	Cover of Time Magazine; 9 March 1925	Succeeded by Marshal Ferdinand Foch
