= William H. Fry =

British American artist (1830–1929)

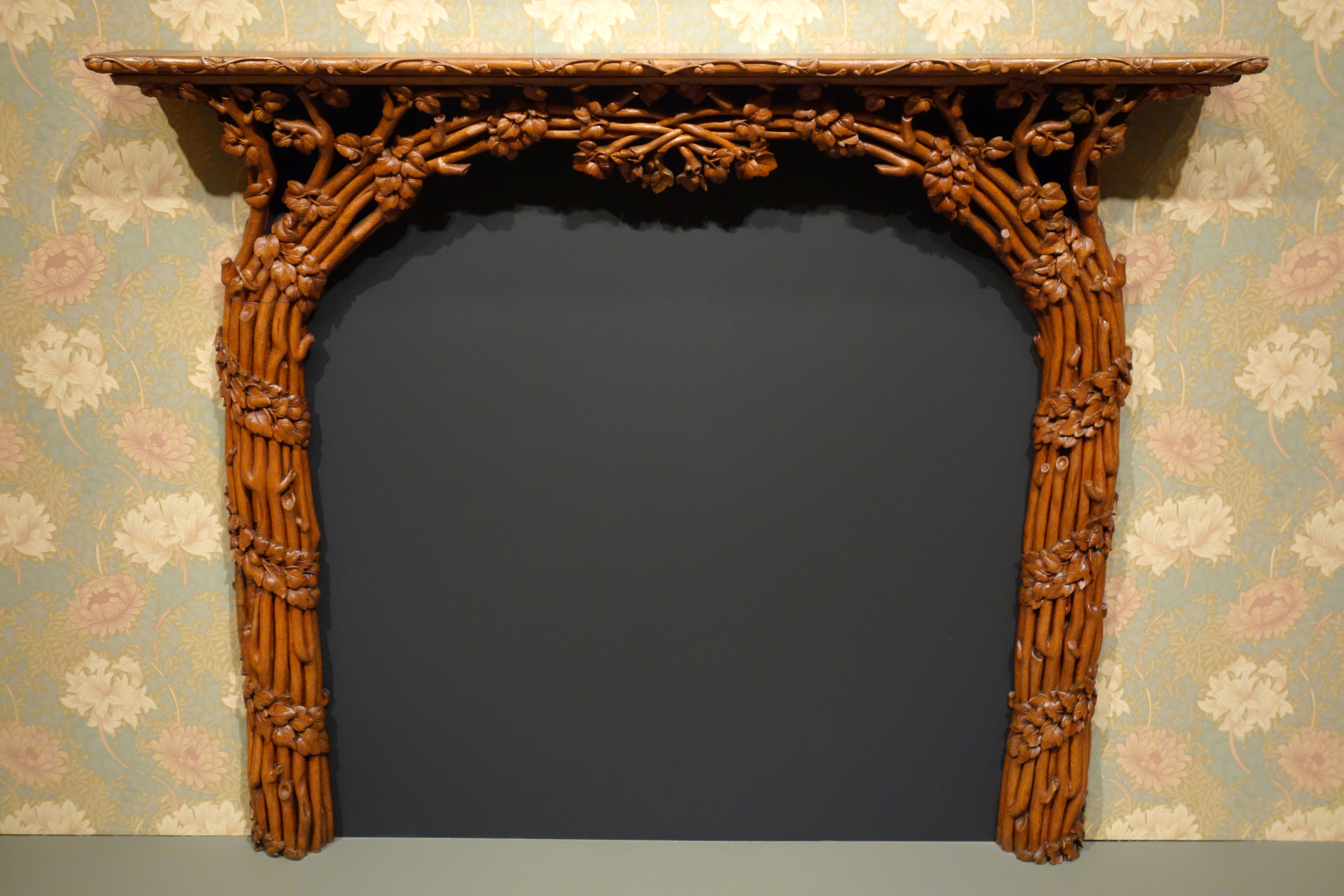
Mantel for Rookwood estate by Henry L. Fry and William H. Fry, 1851-1868

William Henry Fry (5 February 1830 – 26 December 1929) was an English-American wood carver and gilder of the Aesthetic Movement. Born in Bath, Somerset, Fry moved to Cincinnati, Ohio in 1849 to work in a shop run by his father, Henry L. Fry. In the 1870s the family began giving private instruction to Cincinnatians on woodcarving techniques. Many of his wood pieces can be viewed at the Cincinnati Art Museum.
