= Spring Grove Cemetery =

Historic rural cemetery in Hamilton County, Ohio

Coordinates: 39°09′52″N 84°31′22″W

- U.S. National Register of Historic Places
- U.S. National Historic Landmark District
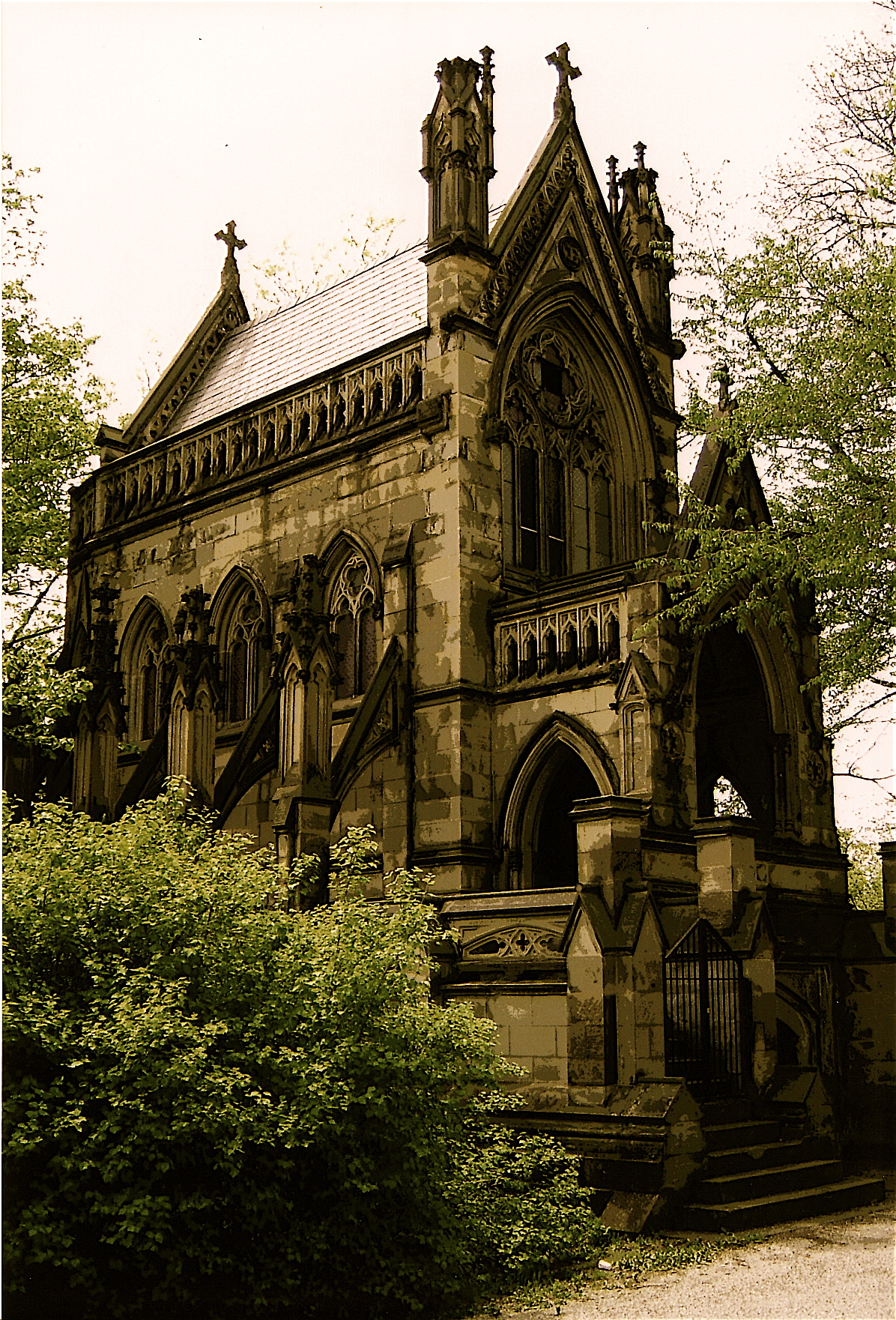
- The Gothic Revival Dexter Memorial at Spring Grove Cemetery & Arboretum

- Location within Ohio Location within the United States
- Location: Cincinnati, Ohio
- Built: 1845
- Architect: Adolph Strauch et al.
- Architectural style: Gothic Revival
- NRHP reference No.: 76001440

Significant dates
- Added to NRHP: May 13, 1976
- Designated NHLD: March 29, 2007

Spring Grove Cemetery and Arboretum is a nonprofit rural cemetery and arboretum located at 4521 Spring Grove Avenue, Cincinnati, Ohio, United States. At a size of 733 acres (2.97 km2), it is the third largest cemetery in the United States, after the Calverton National Cemetery and Abraham Lincoln National Cemetery. The cemetery dates back to 1844 and is recognized as a US National Historic Landmark due to its age, architecture, and notable burials.

== History ==
The cemetery dates from 1844, when members of the Cincinnati Horticultural Society formed a cemetery association. They took their inspiration from contemporary rural cemeteries such as Père Lachaise Cemetery in Paris, and Mount Auburn Cemetery in Cambridge, Massachusetts. The numerous springs and groves suggested the name "Spring Grove". On December 1, 1844, Salmon P. Chase and others prepared the Articles of Incorporation. The cemetery was designed by Howard Daniels and formally chartered on January 21, 1845. The first burial took place on September 1, 1845.

In 1855, Adolph Strauch, a renowned landscape architect, was hired to beautify the grounds. His sense and layout of the "garden cemetery" made of lakes, trees and shrubs, is what visitors today still see. He created a more open landscape by setting limits on private enclosures and monument heights. The results of the redesign earned Strauch praise in the U.S. and abroad, including from Frederick Law Olmsted and the French landscape architect Edouard André. On March 29, 2007, the cemetery was designated a National Historic Landmark. The Spring Grove Cemetery Chapel is listed separately on the National Register of Historic Places.

On October 23, 2013, cemetery staff removed a large and potentially disturbing SpongeBob SquarePants headstone from the grave of U.S. Army Corporal Kimberly Walker and another for her still-living sister a day after her funeral. The family believed they had permission from a worker, who management said had erred. In February 2014, both parties agreed to reinstate the statues with granite slabs largely hiding them from passersby.

== Description ==
Spring Grove encompasses 733 acres (2.97 km^{2}) of which 400 acres (1.6 km^{2}) are currently landscaped and maintained. Its grounds include 12 ponds, many fine tombstones and memorials, and various examples of Gothic Revival architecture.

As of 2005, its National Champion trees were Cladrastis kentukea and Halesia diptera; its State Champion trees included Abies cilicica, Abies koreana, Cedrus libani, Chionanthus virginicus, Eucommia ulmoides, Halesia parvifolia, Metasequoia glyptostroboides, Phellodendron amurense, Picea orientalis, Picea polita, Pinus flexilis, Pinus griffithi, Pinus monticola, Quercus cerris, Quercus nigra, Taxodium distichum, Ulmus serotina, and Zelkova serrata.

== Notable burials ==
See also Category:Burials at Spring Grove Cemetery.

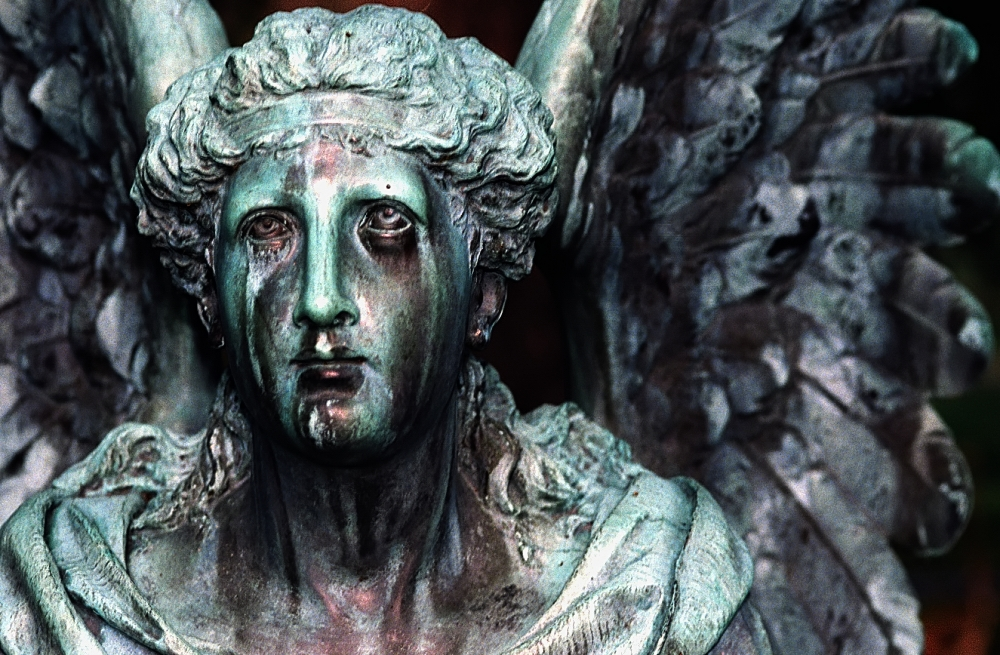
Weeping statue at Spring Grove Cemetery

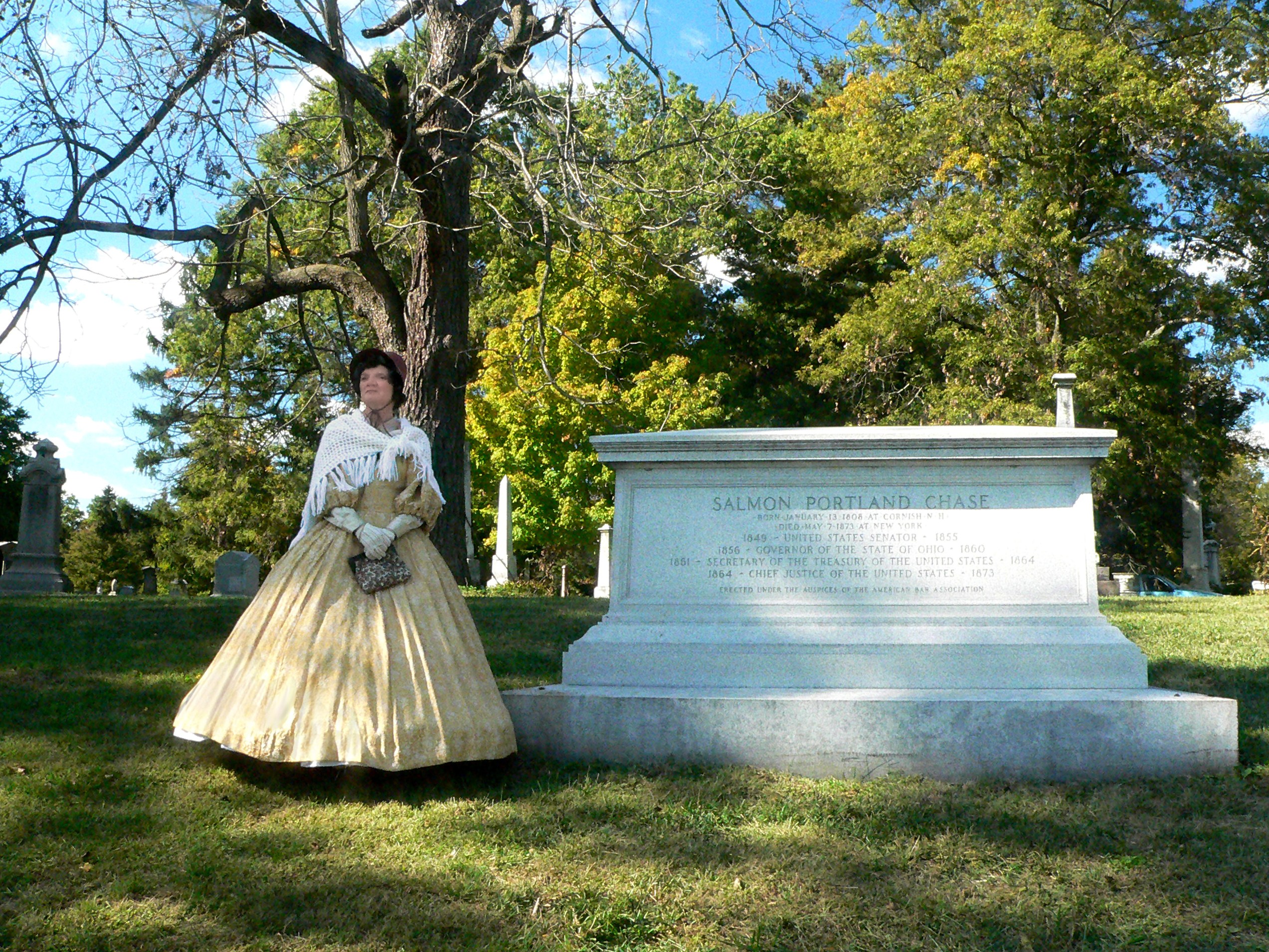
Grave of Salmon P. Chase at Spring Grove Cemetery

- Jacob Ammen, Civil War general
- Nicholas Longworth Anderson, Civil War colonel
- Joshua Hall Bates, Civil War general
- Richard M. Bishop, Cincinnati Mayor and Ohio Governor
- George K. Brady, United States Army officer. Briefly commander of the Department of Alaska
- Emma Lucy Braun, botanist
- Charles Elwood Brown, Civil War brevet brigadier general and U.S. Representative
- Sidney Burbank, Civil War colonel
- Jacob Burnet, US Senator
- Samuel Fenton Cary, Congressman, prohibitionist
- Kate Chase, daughter of Salmon Chase and Washington, D.C. Civil War socialite
- Salmon P. Chase, Chief Justice of the United States
- Henry M. Cist, Civil War brevet brigadier general
- Levi Coffin, Quaker abolitionist
- George B. Cox, Cincinnati political boss and associate of William Howard Taft
- Rich Dauer, professional baseball player
- Arthur F. Devereux, Brevet Brigadier General during the Civil War; from Salem, Massachusetts
- Daniel Drake, physician and writer
- Charles L. Fleischmann, yeast manufacturer
- Joseph Benson Foraker, Governor of Ohio, U.S. Senator, Judge, American Civil War Captain
- Manning Force, Civil War Brevet Brigadier General, Medal of Honor recipient
- George Benson Fox, Civil War officer, 75th Ohio Infantry, manufacturer, Ohio General Assembly
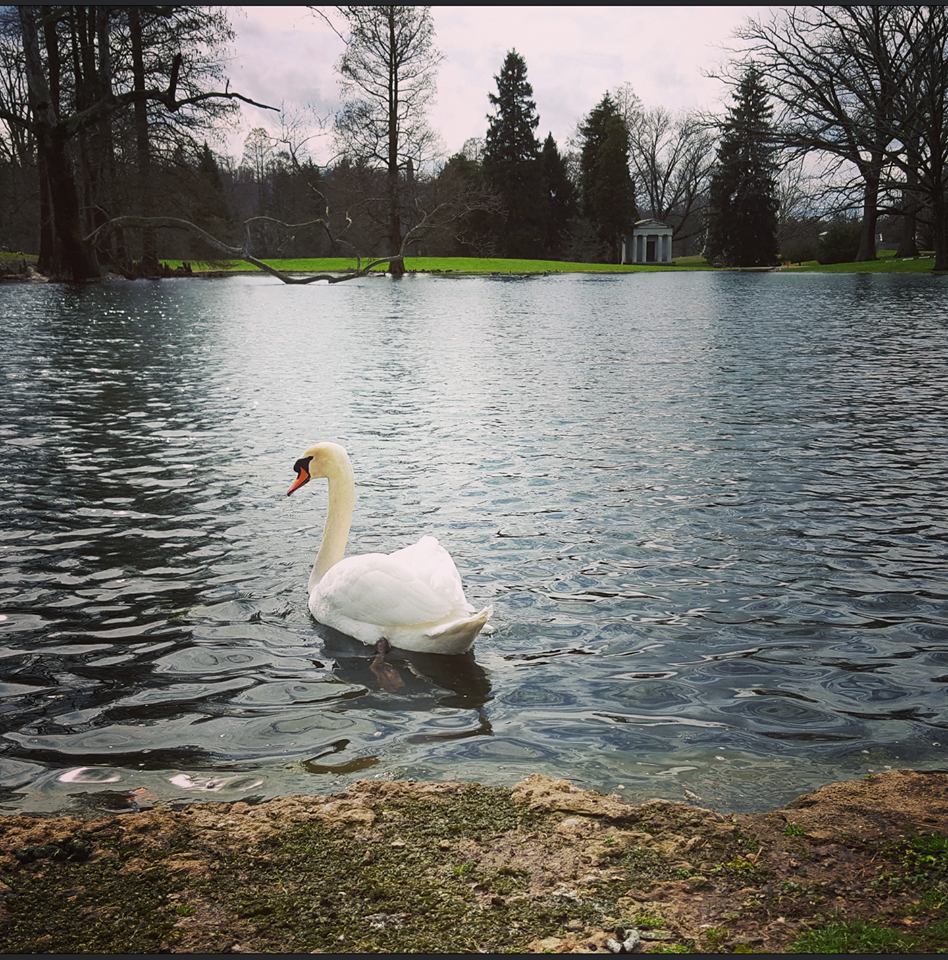
  A swan off the shore of Geyser Lake, one of the small bodies of water located within the cemetery.
- James Gamble, co-founder of Procter & Gamble Company
- Kenner Garrard, Civil War general
- Nikki Giovanni, American poet, writer, commentator, activist, and educator.
- Heinie Groh, Cincinnati Reds Hall of Fame third baseman
- Theodore Sommers Henderson, Bishop of the Methodist Episcopal Church
- Andrew Hickenlooper, Civil War general
- Joseph Hooker, Civil War general and commander of the Army of the Potomac at the Battle of Chancellorsville
- Waite Hoyt, professional baseball player; Hall of Fame pitcher
- Miller Huggins, Hall of Fame baseball manager of New York Yankees during Babe Ruth era
- Isaac M. Jordan, one of the seven founders of Sigma Chi fraternity
- John William Kilbreth, U.S. Army brigadier general during World War I
- Bernard Kroger, founder of Kroger supermarkets
- Alexander Long, Congressman
- Nicholas Longworth, Father of American grape culture
- Joseph Longworth, art collector and patron, son of Nicholas Longworth
- Nicholas Longworth, politician, Speaker of the US House of Representatives, grandson of Nicholas Longworth
- William Haines Lytle, 19th century Ohio, general, politician, poet
- Joseph Mason, artist, who was an uncredited assistant to John James Audubon in illustrating the Birds of America
- Stanley Matthews, Associate Justice of the United States Supreme Court
- Alexander McDowell McCook, Union army general
- Charles Pettit McIlvaine, Episcopal bishop, author, educator and twice Chaplain of the United States Senate
- John McLean, Associate Justice of the United States Supreme Court
- Thomas Satterwhite Noble, painter
- Dave Parker, professional baseball player
- George Hunt Pendleton, Congressman and US Senator
- Sarah Morgan Bryan Piatt, poet
- Thomas C. Powell (1865–1945), railroad executive and member of the War Industries Board
- William Procter, co-founder of Procter and Gamble
- Skip Prosser, Wake Forest University men's basketball head coach at the time of his death, former assistant and head men's basketball coach at Xavier University
- Tony Scott, professional baseball player
- Henry Stanbery, Attorney General of the United States
- Adolph Strauch, landscape architect, designer of Spring Grove Cemetery
- Dudley Sutphin, Cincinnati attorney, judge and French Legion of Honor medal winner
- Alphonso Taft, politician, father of President of the United States William Howard Taft
- Charles Phelps Taft II, Mayor of Cincinnati and son of President William Howard Taft
- Louise Taft, second wife of Alphonso Taft and mother of William Howard Taft
- Mary Lee Tate, painter and teacher
- John Morgan Walden, Bishop of the Methodist Episcopal Church
- Godfrey Weitzel, Civil War general
- Frances Wright, pioneering feminist, abolitionist, and freethinker

== See also ==
- List of botanical gardens and arboretums in the United States
- List of National Historic Landmarks in Ohio
- List of burial places of justices of the Supreme Court of the United States
