= University of Cincinnati Donald P. Klekamp College of Law =

Law school in Cincinnati, Ohio, US

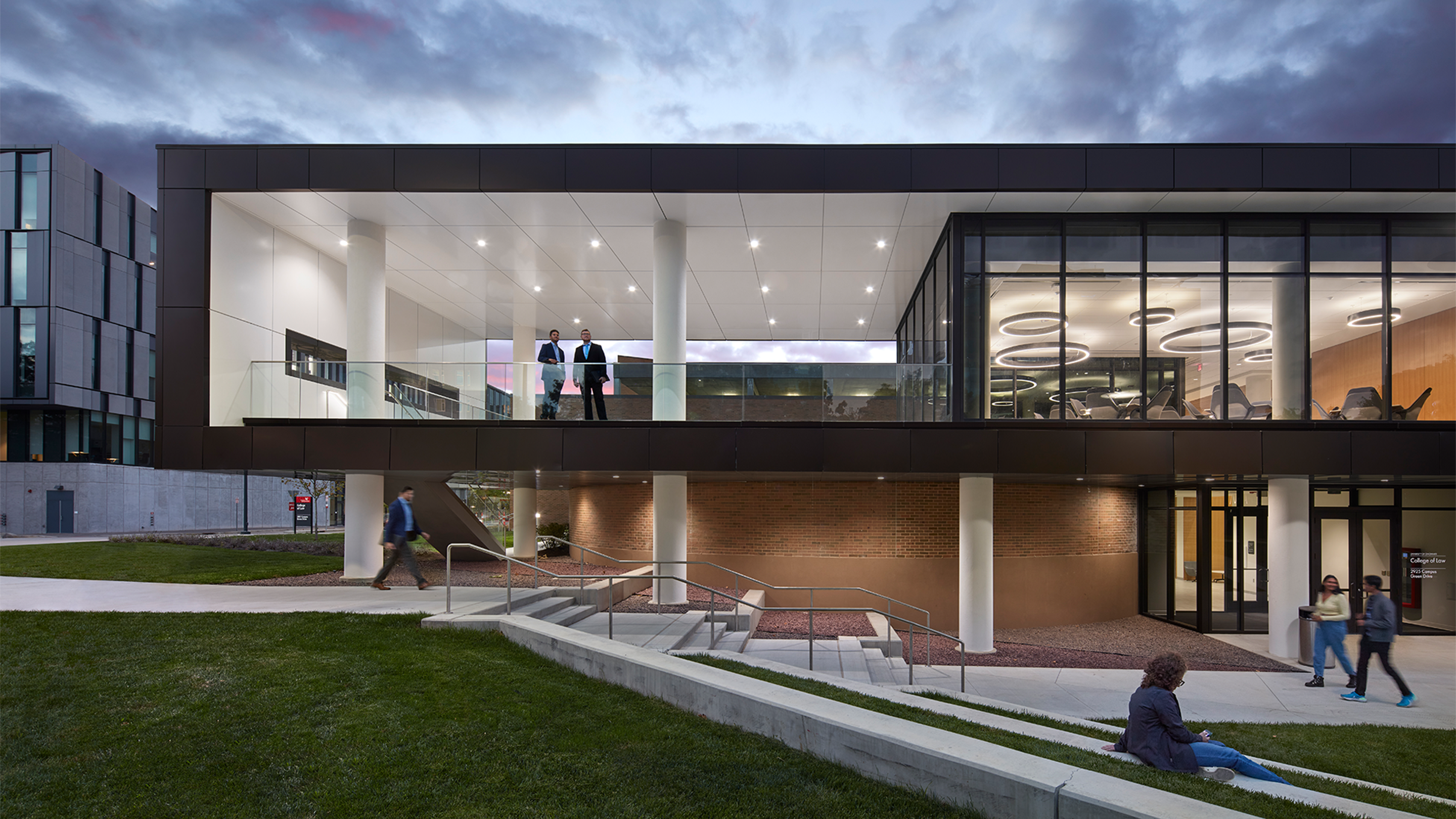
- Motto: Juncta Juvant (Latin) "Strength in Unity"
- Parent school: University of Cincinnati
- Established: 1833; 193 years ago
- School type: Public law school
- Dean: Haider Ala Hamoudi
- Location: Cincinnati, Ohio, U.S. 39.12905°N 84.52010°W
- Enrollment: 398 (2025)
- Faculty: 130
- USNWR ranking: 82nd (tie) (2026)
- Website: law.uc.edu
- ABA profile: Standard 509 Report

The University of Cincinnati Donald P. Klekamp College of Law is the law school of the University of Cincinnati, a public research university in Cincinnati, Ohio.

== History ==
The University of Cincinnati Donald P. Klekamp College of Law was founded in 1833 as the Cincinnati Law School. It is the fourth oldest continuously operating law school in the United States (after Harvard Law School, the University of Virginia School of Law, and Yale Law School) and the first in the nation's interior. In 1900, it was a charter member of the Association of American Law Schools. Then-dean and future 27th president of the United States William Howard Taft (1880) merged it with the University of Cincinnati in 1896.

Until 2022, the College of Law was located at the corner of Clifton Avenue and Calhoun Street in the Heights neighborhood of Cincinnati. Since August 2022, the College of Law has been located in a new building on the corner of Martin Luther King Drive and Campus Green Drive. In 2026, the college was renamed the Donald P. Klekamp College of Law following a $43.2 million gift from the family of alumnus and attorney Donald P. Klekamp.

== Academics ==
The College of Law offers the Juris Doctor (JD), as well as the Master of Laws (LLM) in the US Legal System for international attorneys. In addition, the college sponsors four joint degree programs, including a JD/MBA with the Lindner College of Business; a JD/MA Women's Gender & Sexuality Studies with UC's Department of Women's, Gender, and Sexuality Studies; a JD/Master of Community Planning with the School of Planning in the College of Design, Architecture, Art, and Planning; and a JD/MA or JD/PhD with the School of Public and International Affairs. Graduate certificates in US Law are also available.

In 2026, U.S. News & World Report, ranked University of Cincinnati College of Law the 82nd best law school out of 197 in the nation.

== Publications ==
- University of Cincinnati Law Review
- Human Rights Quarterly
- Immigration and Human Rights Law Review
- Intellectual Property and Computer Law Journal

== Deans ==
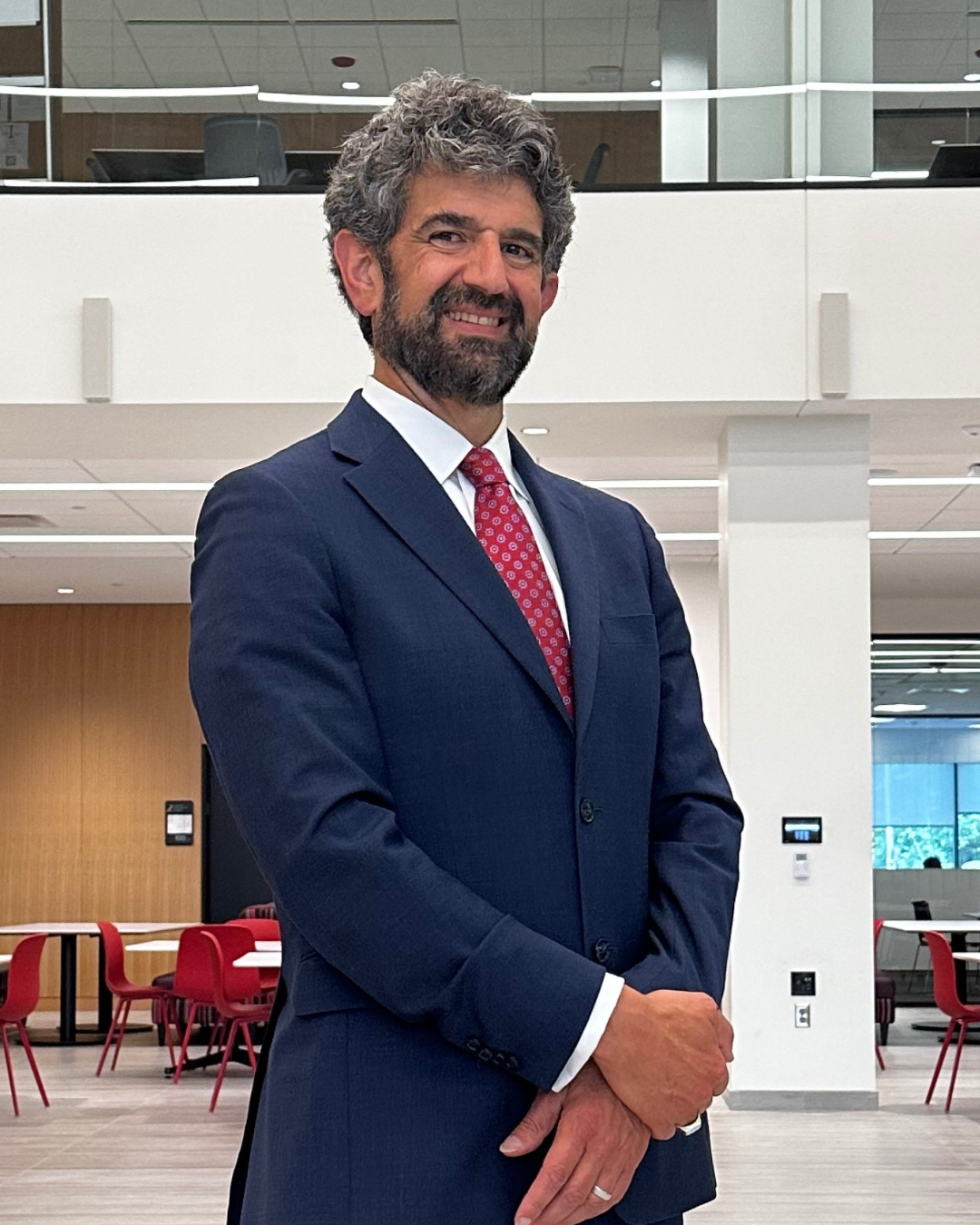
Haider Ala Hamoudi, Dean and Nippert Professor of Law

| Dean | Years Served |
|---|---|
| Timothy Walker | 1833–1843 |
| William S. Groesbeck | 1844–1869 |
| Charles L. Telford | 1844–1869 |
| Maskell S. Curwen | 1850–1868 |
| Rotated among faculty | 1869–1873 |
| J. Bryant Walker | 1873–1874 |
| Rufus King | 1875–1880 |
| Jacob D. Cox | 1880–1897 |
| William Howard Taft | 1897–1900 |
| Gustavus H. Wald | 1900–1902 |
| William P. Rogers | 1902–1916 |
| Albert B. Benedict | 1916–1926 |
| Merton L. Ferson | 1926–1946 |
| Frank S. Rowley | 1946–1952 |
| Roscoe L. Barrow | 1952–1965 |
| Claude S. Sowle | 1965–1969 |
| Samuel S. Wilson | 1969–1970; 1973*; 1974–1978 |
| Edward A. Mearns Jr. | 1970–1973 |
| Victor E. Schwartz | 1973–1974* |
| Jorge L. Carro | 1978–1979* |
| Gordon A. Christenson | 1979–1986 |
| Thomas Gerety | 1986–1989 |
| Joseph P. Tomain | 1989–1990*; 1990–2005 |
| Louis D. Bilionis | 2005–2015 |
| Jennifer S. Bard | 2015–2017 |
| Verna L. Williams | 2017–2019**; 2019–2022 |
| Michael Whiteman | 2022–2023** |
| Haider Ala Hamoudi | 2023–present |

*Acting
**Interim

== Employment ==
According to University of Cincinnati's 2022 ABA-required disclosures, 80% of the Class of 2022 obtained full-time, long-term, JD-required employment nine months after graduation.

== Notable alumni ==
William Howard Taft, who the 27th president of the United States and the tenth chief justice of the United States, graduated from the college in 1880 and served as its dean in the 1890s. Willis Van Devanter, who was a U.S. Supreme Court associate justice, graduated from the college in 1881. Additionally, Jimmy Nippert, the namesake of the university's Nippert Stadium, was a student at UC Law at the time of his death in 1923.
