= Nicholas Longworth (winemaker) =

American winemaker (1783–1863)

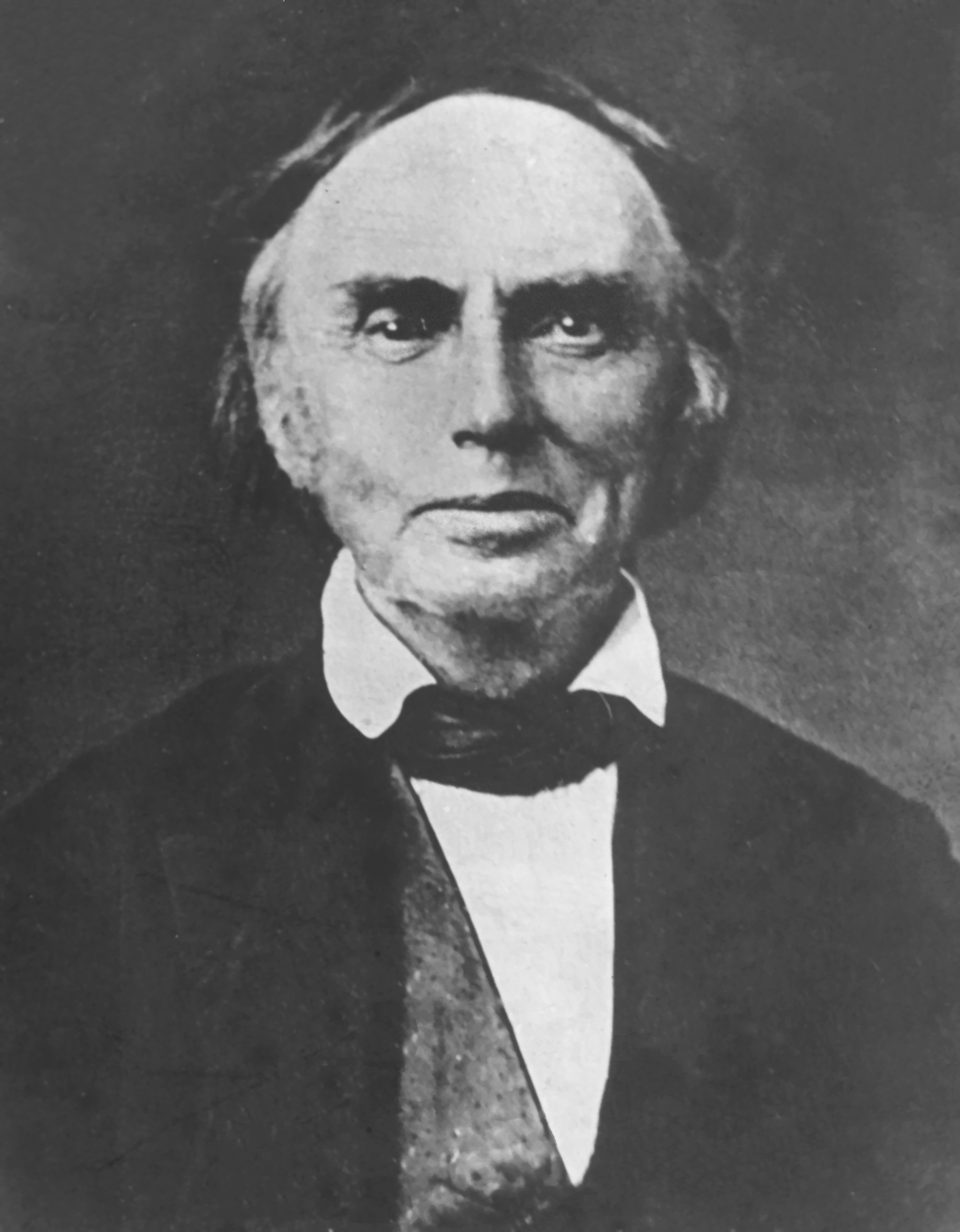
- Longworth in 1860
- Born: January 16, 1783; Newark, New Jersey
- Died: February 10, 1863 (aged 80); Cincinnati, Ohio
- Burial place: Spring Grove Cemetery
- Occupations: Lawyer, banker, real estate speculator, winemaker
- Known for: Winemaking
- Spouse: Susanna Howell
- Children: Joseph Longworth; Catharine Longworth Anderson
- Relatives: Longworth family

Nicholas Longworth (January 16, 1783 – February 10, 1863) was an American real estate speculator and winemaker as well as the founder of the Longworth family in Ohio. Longworth was an influential figure in the early history of American wine, producing sparkling Catawba wine from grapes grown in his Ohio River Valley vineyard. He also made significant contributions supporting the arts, impacting the careers of Robert S. Duncanson, Hiram Powers, and others.

== Personal life ==
Longworth was born in Newark, New Jersey, on January 16, 1783. He moved to Cincinnati, Ohio, in 1804 and married Susanna Howell, three years his junior, daughter of Silas and Hannah (Vaughan) Howell, on Christmas Eve, 1807. She was already a widow as her first husband had died from hazardous frontier life.

Longworth pursued the study of law under Jacob Burnet, one of Cincinnati's first millionaires. Early in his career he accepted plots of land as payment, which increased in value as Cincinnati grew, and by 1818 he quit being a lawyer to manage his real estate holdings.

He was an abolitionist and his aid to a runaway slave was claimed to be the inspiration for Uncle Tom's Cabin.

Longworth was very invested in the arts. He made contact with every artist in Cincinnati between 1829 and 1858. He offered financial aid, letters of introduction, critique, and commissions. He hired Robert S. Duncanson to paint eight large landscape murals in his home, which formally launched Duncanson's career.

His Greek Revival villa, then on the eastern edge of Cincinnati, is now the Taft Museum of Art in Cincinnati.

== Winemaking ==
Believing Cincinnati to be an ideal location for grape cultivation, he established viticulture as a successful venture on the hills adjoining the city. He planted a vineyard of Catawba on the Mount Adams hillside and began making a sparkling wine from the grapes using the traditional method used in Champagne. From the 1830s through the 1850s, Longworth's still and sparkling Catawba were being distributed from California to Europe where they received numerous press accolades. In the 1850s, a journalist from The Illustrated London News noted that the still white Catawba compared favorably to the hock wines of the Rhine and the sparkling Catawba "transcends the Champagnes of France".

The wines were also well received at home in the United States where Henry Wadsworth Longfellow published a poem dedicated to Nicholas Longworth titled Ode to Catawba Wine. The popularity of Longworth's wine encouraged a flurry of plantings along the Ohio River Valley and up north to Lake Erie and Finger Lakes region of New York.

So successful was he that he has been called the Father of American Grape Culture. The growing tide of German immigrants coming down the Ohio Valley to Cincinnati liked his wine. Longworth had found a lucrative market: the new German immigrants wanted an affordable, drinkable table wine to continue with the traditions of their homeland, and he enjoyed a virtual monopoly. With his success in wine making, Longworth participated in charitable giving throughout Cincinnati, including a noteworthy donation of the land on which the Cincinnati Observatory is built. Besides being a pioneer and leading horticultural expert in his section, he was recognized as an authority in national horticultural matters. His writings, though individually short and now out of date, exercised a wide influence in his day.

His former vineyard is now Eden Park.

== See also ==
- Sebastian Rentz (winemaker)
