= List of University of Cincinnati College of Law alumni =

The University of Cincinnati Donald P. Klekamp College of Law in Cincinnati, Ohio, was established at the Cincinnati Law School in 1833. Following are some of its notable alumni.

== Academia ==
Name	Class	Notability	References
Gaius Glenn Atkins	1891	Congregational minister and professor of homiletics at Auburn Theological Seminary	
James Hartley Beal	1886	Ohio House of Representatives, acting president of Scio College, and professor of pharmacy at Pittsburg College of Pharmacy	
Howard Landis Bevis	1910	President of Ohio State University and Ohio Supreme Court	
Leonard Case Jr.	1844	Founder and endower of Case School of Applied Science	
Kenneth Lawson	1989	Faculty specialist at the William S. Richardson School of Law	
Harold G. Maier	1963	International law scholar; former counselor on international law with the U.S. Department of State	
David M. Smolin	1986	Professor and director of Cumberland School of Law's Center for Biotechnology, Law, and Ethics	

== Business ==
Name	Class	Notability	References
Ian Bruce Eichner	1969	Real estate developer	
Charles DeLano Hine	1893	Civil engineer, lawyer, railway official, and US Army colonel	
William Pitt Trimble		Businessman and attorney	
John P. Williams Jr.	1966	President of the Greater Cincinnati Chamber of Commerce and attorney	

== Judiciary ==
Name	Class	Notability	References
Coleman W. Avery	1905	Ohio Supreme Court associate justice	
William M. Barker	1967	Chief justice of the Tennessee Supreme Court	
Michael R. Barrett	1977	United States District Court for the Southern District of Ohio district judge	
Sandra Beckwith	1968	US District Court for the Southern District of Ohio chief judge	
William Bertelsman	1961	United States District Court for the Eastern District of Kentucky chief judge and senior judge	
Howard Landis Bevis	1910	Ohio Supreme Court and president of Ohio State University	
Morris Lyon Buchwalter	1870	Judge of the common-pleas court of the first judicial district of Ohio	
Robert Burch		Superior Court of San Diego judge and head football coach at the University of Cincinnati	
George H. Clark	1894	Justice of the Ohio Supreme Court	
Robert H. Day	1891	Associate justice of the Ohio Supreme Court	
Joe Deters	1982	Ohio Supreme Court associate justice and Ohio state treasurer	
Timothy Sylvester Hogan	1931	US District Court for the Southern District of Ohio chief judge	
Howard Clark Hollister	1880	US District Court for the Southern District of Ohio judge	
John David Holschuh	1951	US District Court for the Southern District of Ohio senior judge	
Samuel Furman Hunt	1867	Ohio Senate, Judge Advocate General of Ohio, and judge of the Superior Court of Cincinnati	
Tracie Hunter		Judge in Hamilton County and pastor	
James G. Johnson	1880	Justice of the Ohio Supreme Court and mayor of Springfield, Ohio	
Sharon L. Kennedy	1991	Supreme Court of Ohio justice	
Joseph P. Kinneary	1935	Judge of the United States District Court for the Southern District of Ohio	
Laura Liu	1991	Illinois Appellate Court judge	
Nicholas Longworth II		Ohio Supreme Court justice	
Robert O. Lukowsky		Kentucky Supreme Court justice	
Stephen Markman	1974	Justice, Michigan Supreme Court	
Carrington T. Marshall	1892	Chief justice of the Ohio Supreme Court and presiding judge of the Nuremberg War Crimes Trial	
Isaac Jack Martin	1932	US Court of Customs and Patent Appeals associate judge	
James Morris		North Dakota Supreme Court justice and North Dakota attorney general	
Hugh L. Nichols	1886	Chief justice of the Ohio Supreme Court and lieutenant governor of Ohio	
Joseph W. O'Hara	1884	Associate justice of the Ohio Supreme Court	
Selwyn N. Owen	1862	Justice of the Ohio Supreme Court	
Mark P. Painter	1973	Judge of the Ohio Court of Appeals	
Emmett N. Parker	1882	Chief justice of the Washington Supreme Court	
John Weld Peck	1898	US District Court for the Southern District of Ohio judge	
John Weld Peck II	1938	US Court of Appeals for the Sixth Circuit senior judge	
David Stewart Porter	1934	US District Court for the Southern District of Ohio chief judge	
William S. Richardson	1943	Chief justice of the Hawaii Supreme Court	
Thomas M. Rose	1973	United States District Court for the Southern District of Ohio district judge	
Samuel Murray Rosenstein	1931	Senior judge of the US Court of International Trade and US Customs Court	
Carl Bernard Rubin	1944	US District Court for the Southern District of Ohio chief judge	
George Read Sage	Non-degreed	US District Court for the Southern District of Ohio judge	
Louis J. Schneider Jr.	1949	Ohio Supreme Court and Ohio House of Representatives	
Thomas Adiel Sherwood	1857	Justice of the Missouri Supreme Court	
Richard Elihu Sloan	1882	Arizona Territorial Supreme Court associate justice, US District Court for the District of Arizona judge, and governor of Arizona Territory	
Will P. Stephenson	1895	Supreme Court of Ohio justice	
James Garfield Stewart	1905	U.S. Supreme Court associate justice and Ohio Supreme Court justice	
Frederick L. Taft	1891	Ohio Courts of Common Pleas judge	
William Howard Taft	1880	Chief justice of the United States and 27th president of the United States	
Willis Van Devanter	1881	Associate justice of the United States Supreme Court	
John Wesley Warrington	1869	US Court of Appeals for the Sixth Circuit senior judge	
Paul Charles Weick	1920	United States Court of Appeals for the Sixth Circuit chief judge	
Benjamin Willoughby	1879	Indiana Supreme Court justice	
Donald C. Wintersheimer	1960	Kentucky Supreme Court justice	
Daniel Thew Wright	1887	Supreme Court of the District of Columbia associate justice	
Marilyn Zayas	1997	Ohio Supreme Court associate justice and Ohio First District Court of Appeals judge	

== Law ==
Name	Class	Notability	References
Thomas C. Campbell	1870	Prosecuting attorney in Cincinnati	
Neil Chatterjee		Former chairman and commissioner of Federal Energy Regulatory Commission	
Stanley M. Chesley	1960	Attorney with Waite, Schneider, Bayless & Chesley Co., L.P.A	
Charles Keating	1948	Founding partner of Keating, Muething & Klekamp	
Billy Martin	1976	Defense attorney of Washington D.C.	
Lawrence Maxwell Jr.	1875	United States solicitor general	
James Morris		North Dakota attorney general and North Dakota Supreme Court justice	

== Military ==
Name	Class	Notability	References
John D. Altenburg	1973	United States Army major general	
Thomas M. Anderson	1858	United States Army general	
Joseph Scott Fullerton	1858	Chairman of the Chickamauga & Chattanooga National Military Park and Civil War brevet brigadier general	
Gates P. Thruston		Judge-advocate general and brigadier general of the Army of the Cumberland, author	

== Organizations ==
Name	Class	Notability	References
Theodore S. Parvin	1837	Organizer of the State Historical Society of Iowa and a founder of the Masonic Order of Iowa	
Michael Clarkson Ryan	1842	Founder of Beta Theta Pi	
Russell Wilson		Mayor of Cincinnati, Ohio and founder of Sigma Sigma	

== Politics ==
Name	Class	Notability	References
Alfred G. Allen	1890	U.S. House of Representatives	
Helen Elsie Austin	1930	United States Foreign Service officer	
James Hartley Beal	1886	Ohio House of Representatives, acting president of Scio College, and professor of pharmacy at Pittsburg College of Pharmacy	
Albert S. Berry	1858	U.S. House of Representatives and Kentucky Senate	
John Berry	1857	U.S. House of Representatives	
Ted Berry	1931	First African-American mayor of Cincinnati and NAACP attorney	
Stanley E. Bowdle	1889	U.S. House of Representatives	
John L. Bretz	1880	U.S. House of Representatives	
Jacob H. Bromwell	1870	U.S. House of Representatives	
Jim Butler		Member and speaker pro tempore of the Ohio House of Representatives	
John A. Caldwell	1876	U.S. House of Representatives, lieutenant governor of Ohio, mayor of Cincinnati, and judge of the court of common pleas	
Joseph Gurney Cannon	Non-degreed	Speaker of the United States House of Representatives	
Willis Carto	Non-degreed	Far-right political activist	
Samuel Fenton Cary	1837	U.S. House of Representatives and vice presidential candidate	
John C. Chaney	1882	U.S. House of Representatives	
Neil Chatterjee		Chairman of the Federal Energy Regulatory Commission	
Norton Parker Chipman	1859	Secretary of the District of Columbia, U.S. congressman, first presiding justice of the California Third District Court of Appeal	
Donald D. Clancy	1948	U.S. House of Representatives and mayor of Cincinnati	
Champ Clark	1875	U.S. House of Representatives and speaker of the House	
Alfred M. Cohen	1880	Ohio Senate	
Robert Crosser	1901	U.S. House of Representatives	
William Cumback		U.S. House of Representatives	
Charles G. Dawes	1886	30th vice president of the United States and Nobel Peace Prize recipient	
Thomas C. Dawson		US ambassador to the Dominican Republic, Colombia, Chile, and Panama	
James W. Denver	1844	Governor of the Kansas Territory, secretary of state of California, and namesake of Denver, Colorado	
Joe Deters	1982	Ohio State Treasurer and Ohio Supreme Court associate justice	
Henry L. Dickey	1859	U.S. House of Representatives	
Robert E. Doan	1857	U.S. House of Representatives	
Ozro J. Dodds		U.S. House of Representatives	
Sidney Edgerton	1845	1st territorial governor of Montana, chief justice of the Idaho Territorial Supreme Court, U.S. House of Representatives	
Henry I. Emerson	1893	U.S. House of Representatives	
William H. Enochs	1866	U.S. House of Representatives	
Richard P. Ernst	1880	U.S. senator from Kentucky	
Gustavus A. Finkelnburg	1859	U.S. House of Representatives and US District Court for the Eastern District of Missouri judge	
Joseph Fischer		Kentucky House of Representatives	
David Fowler	1983	Tennessee Senate	
Robert E. Freer	1917	Chair of the Federal Trade Commission	
Martin K. Gantz	1883	U.S. House of Representatives	
Warren Gard	1894	U.S. House of Representatives	
John J. Gilligan	1947	Governor of Ohio	
Thomas J. Godfrey	1857	Ohio Senate	
Herman P. Goebel	1872	U.S. House of Representatives	
J. Henry Goeke	1891	U.S. House of Representatives	
Lewis B. Gunckel	1851	U.S. House of Representatives and Ohio Senate	
Judson Harmon	1870	U.S. attorney general and governor of Ohio	
Richard A. Harrison	1846	U.S. House of Representatives, Ohio House of Representatives, and Ohio Senate	
Victor Heintz	1899	U.S. House of Representatives	
William E. Hess		U.S. House of Representatives	
James M. Hinds	1856	U.S. House of Representatives	
Greg J. Holbrock	1932	U.S. House of Representatives	
Charles John Howard		President of the Ohio Senate	
John Wesley Hoyt	1849, attended	Governor of the Wyoming Territory	
David P. Hull	1840	Wisconsin State Assembly	
Henry Thomas Hunt	1903	Mayor of Cincinnati	
Samuel Furman Hunt	1867	Ohio Senate, judge advocate general Ohio, and a judge of the Superior Court of Cincinnati	
Stephanie J. Jones		Chief opportunities officer, US Federal Government	
James Joyce	1892	U.S. House of Representatives	
Charles Cyrus Kearns	1894	U.S. House of Representatives	
William J. Keating	1950	U.S. House of Representatives	
Henry W. King	1839	Ohio secretary of state	
Walter Lanfersiek		Attorney and executive secretary of the Socialist Party of America	
William Lawrence	1840	U.S. House of Representatives and first comptroller of the Treasury	
David Linton	1840	Ohio Senate and a founder of Beta Theta Pi	
Nicholas Longworth	1894	U.S. House of Representatives and speaker of the House	
David P. Lowe	1851	U.S. House of Representatives	
Charlie Luken	1976	U.S. House of Representatives and mayor of Cincinnati, Ohio	
Thomas Henry McConica	1883	House of Commons of Canada	
Edwin P. Morrow	1902	Governor of Kentucky	
Grant E. Mouser	1890	U.S. House of Representatives	
Paula Boggs Muething	2003	Cincinnati's first Asian-American city manager	
Hugh L. Nichols	1886	Chief justice of the Ohio Supreme Court and lieutenant governor of Ohio	
Carl L. Nippert		Lieutenant governor of Ohio and Ohio Senate	
Edward Follansbee Noyes	1858	Governor of Ohio	
William Parham		First African-American in the Ohio House of Representatives	
John M. Pattison	1872	Governor of Ohio	
William G. Pickrel	1912	Lieutenant governor of Ohio	
Connie Pillich		Ohio House of Representatives	
Lois Pines	1963	Massachusetts Senate	
Atlee Pomerene	1886	Lieutenant governor of Ohio and United States senator	
Christian L. Poorman	1855	Ohio secretary of state and Ohio House of Representatives.	
Todd Portune	1983	Cincinnati City Council and Hamilton County commissioner	
Walter E. Powell		U.S. House of Representatives	
Aftab Pureval	2008	Mayor of Cincinnati	
Homer A. Ramey	Non-degreed	U.S. House of Representatives	
Carl West Rich	1924	U.S. House of Representatives and mayor of Cincinnati	
James Wallace Robinson	1851	U.S. House of Representatives	
Charles W. Sawyer	1911	United States Secretary of Commerce	
Milton Sayler		U.S. House of Representatives	
Louis J. Schneider Jr.	1949	Ohio Supreme Court and Ohio House of Representatives	
Bill Seitz	1978	Ohio House of Representatives and Ohio Senate	
Philemon Simpson	1843	Wisconsin State Assembly and Wisconsin State Senate	
Yvette Simpson		Cincinnati City Council and former chief executive of Democracy for America	
David L. Sleeper	1880	Speaker of the Ohio House of Representatives	
Richard Elihu Sloan	1882	Governor of Arizona Territory, Arizona Territorial Supreme Court associate justice, and US District Court for the District of Arizona judge	
John S. Snook	1887	U.S. House of Representatives	
Jacob B. Snyder	1892	Ohio House of Representatives	
William R. Stewart	1886	Ohio House of Representatives	
Bellamy Storer	1869	U.S. House of Representatives and U.S. minister or ambassador to Belgium, Spain, and Austria	
Charles L. Swain		Speaker of the Ohio House of Representatives	
Bob Taft	1976	Governor of Ohio	
Charles Tatgenhorst Jr.	1910	U.S. House of Representatives and Ohio First District Court of Appeals judge	
Joseph D. Taylor	1860	U.S. House of Representatives	
Samuel McIntire Taylor	1884	Ohio House of Representatives, Ohio secretary of state, and U.S. consul to Glasgow, Scotland; Calao, Peru; and Birmingham, England	
Claudia Tenney		U.S. House of Representatives	
William E. Tou Velle	1889	U.S. House of Representatives	
Charles Townsend	1866	Ohio House of Representatives, Ohio Senate, and Ohio secretary of state	
H. Clay Van Voorhis		U.S. House of Representatives	
John L. Vance	1861	U.S. House of Representatives	
Robert Ward	1978	Minority leader of the Connecticut House of Representatives	
James B. Weaver	1856	Populist Party candidate for U.S. President, 1892	
Leroy Welsh	1871	Ohio state treasurer	
Charles Preston Wickham		U.S. House of Representatives	
Russell Wilson		Mayor of Cincinnati, Ohio, and founder of Sigma Sigma	
Thomas L. Young	1865	Governor of Ohio and U.S. House of Representatives	

== Sports ==
Name	Class	Notability	References
Larry Barbiere		Competition swimmer and Olympic athlete	
Katie Blackburn		Executive vice president of the Cincinnati Bengals	
Robert Burch		Head football coach at the University of Cincinnati and Superior Court of San Diego judge	
Cris Collinsworth	1991	Professional football player with the Cincinnati Bengals and television sportscaster for NBC Sunday Night Football	
Amos Foster		Head football coach at the University of Cincinnati, the University of Nebraska, and Miami University	
John Holifield	1996	Professional football player with the Cincinnati Bengals	
Miller Huggins	1902	Manager of the New York Yankees, member of the Baseball Hall of Fame	
C. J. McDiarmid		Principal owner of the Cincinnati Reds	
Dudley Sutphin	1900	Amateur tennis player, attorney, and judge	
