= Thomas R. Chandler =

American political candidate

Thomas R. Chandler (born circa 1954) is an Ohio medical technician who has been a perennial candidate for the Ohio House and the United States House of Representatives as a Democrat. Chandler served on the Ohio Democratic Party's State Central Committee in the 1990s but Chandler is now a Republican.

Chandler, a resident of the California neighborhood of Cincinnati, graduated from New Richmond High School and attended the University of Cincinnati. He worked at Cincinnati's Jewish Hospital as a lead material specialist from 1973.

Chandler was a candidate for the United States House of Representatives in the Second District in 1992, running unopposed for the Democratic nomination in the June 2 primary election. That day he elected Democratic State Committeeman for the Second Congressional District. The vote was 9,856 for Chandler, 4,442 for attorney Rupert E. Ruppert, and 6,858 for Terry M. Tranter.

The heavily Republican Second District included all of Clermont, Adams, and Brown Counties, and parts of Hamilton and Warren Counties. The Dayton Daily News wrote "Veteran Bill Gradison is being perfunctorily challenged by Thomas Chandler, who admits to having happily voted for Rep. Gradison in the past. The Democrats wanted to put somebody on the ticket." Chandler supported raising taxes to lower the budget deficit, was pro-choice, and opposed the North American Free Trade Agreement (NAFTA) and school vouchers. On November 3, Chandler lost to Gradison, a congressman since 1975, by a vote of 75,924 to 177,720, with write-in candidate Emily Roughen Wood receiving seven votes. Gradison hugely outspent his opponent, $74,652 to $290. On the same day he lost his congressional bid, he was chosen an elector for Ohio and cast his votes on December 14 for Bill Clinton and Al Gore.

When Gradison resigned in January 1993, Chandler was the first to announce his candidacy in the March 16 special primary election for the overwhelmingly Republican district. Chandler said the most important issue was the economy and felt taxes needed to be raised. He supported cuts in foreign aid, defense, NASA, and health research. Chandler was opposed by Sharonville attorney Lee Hornberger; Ralph Applegate, the business agent of an architect, who lived outside the district in Columbus; Ray Mitchell, a perennial candidate and business broker from Montgomery County's Miami Township, also outside the district; and Robert Dale McDilda Sr. of Price Hill, who ran for the United States Senate in Alabama in 1986. The Dayton Daily News described Chandler's opponents in skeptical terms:

When Mr. Mitchell writes campaign literature or letters to the editor, he refers to himself in the third person ("Ray Mitchell has been ahead of the times") and is generous in giving himself credit for happenings he didn't cause, such as cutbacks at Wright-Patterson Air Force Base and Mound Labs. The other Democrats are Robert McDilda whose Apocalyptic slash-the-deficit fervor collapses in the details, and Ralph Applegate, a Columbus engineer who says he was fired unconstitutionally by the Defense Department and would move into the district if he won.

"We ran a decent, fair, open Democratic primary," Hornberger said after he defeated Chandler. "I started out with five supporters in mid-January and by tonight I had two- thirds of the Democratic votes." These were the final results:

1. Lee Hornberger, 3,627 (45.99%)
2. Thomas R. Chandler, 2,223 (28.19%)
3. Ralph A. Applegate, 840 (10.65%)
4. Ray Mitchell, 795 (10.08%)
5. Robert Dale McDilda, Sr., 402 (5.10%)

Hornberger lost the special general election to another attorney, Rob Portman.

Chandler in 1994 won the Democratic nomination in the May 3 primary by defeating Terry M. Tranter, 10,546 (76.15%) to 8,372 (44.25%). He faced incumbent Jacquelyn K. O'Brien in the 37th Ohio House district, which included the eastern Cincinnati neighborhoods of Oakley, the East End, Hyde Park, Mount Lookout, Columbia Tusculum, Linwood, California and Mount Washington; the cities of Norwood and Newtown; and Anderson Township. He told The Cincinnati Post that year that he was in favor of casino gambling in Ohio and supported the death penalty. O'Brien won the endorsement of The Post, which wrote Chandler "would bring enthusiasm to the job but needs time to mature politically." Chandler lost the election in a heavily Republican district. O'Brien received 29,198 votes (76.15%) to Chandler's 9,146 (23.85%). Chandler was also greatly outspent by his opponent: $10,602 to $1,160.

Chandler won the Democratic nomination to challenge Portman in 1996 by defeating Ray Mitchell in the March primary with three-fourths of the vote. "I know it is going to be a rough campaign, but I'm ready for it," Chandler said. He predicted a negative campaign, "and the negatives may come from me. I've got to be on the attack. I can't just sit back there and not be aggressive, as I did against Bill Gradison." The Cincinnati Post called Chandler a "sacrificial lamb" for his party, a status Chandler acknowledged. "Even I know a Democrat's chances of winning are like a snowball's chance in hell, but I've got to do what I've got to do." "God love Tom, he just keeps going out there," said Hamilton County Democratic Chairman Timothy D. Burke. "And he has done surprisingly well in some areas."

In the fall, The Post wrote "Chandler deserves credit for offering a credible alternative, and he has a compelling belief in the work ethic. But in this race, Portman is clearly the better qualified candidate. We endorse him enthusiastically." Chandler lost 58,715 to 186,853, with Natural Law Party candidate Kathleen M. McKnight receiving 13,905 votes. Chandler was gracious in defeat, telling The Post "Rob is a gentleman, a fine man. I think the district got a good man."

Chandler was a candidate in the May 2, 2006, primary election for the Ohio Republican Party's State Central Committee for the Seventh Senatorial District. He received 9,344 votes (32.5%), finishing second to Leslie J. Spaeth.

== See also ==
- Ohio's 2nd congressional district
