= Earl Wagner =

Earl Wagner may refer to:

- Earl T. Wagner (1908–1990), U.S. representative from Ohio
- J. Earl Wagner (1861–1943), businessman from Philadelphia, Pennsylvania
