= Herbert S. Bigelow =

American politician (1870–1951)

Herbert Seely Bigelow
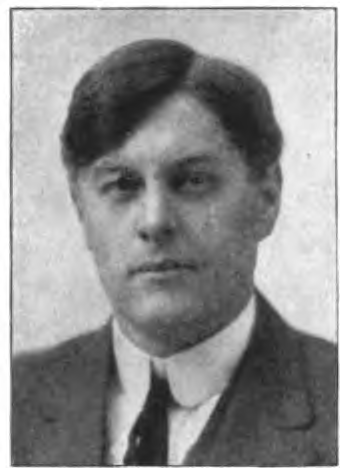

Member of the U.S. House of Representatives from Ohio's 2nd district
- In office January 3, 1937 – January 3, 1939
- Preceded by: William E. Hess
- Succeeded by: William E. Hess

Member of the Ohio House of Representatives from the Hamilton County district
- In office January 6, 1913 – January 3, 1915 Serving with 9 others
- Preceded by: 9 others
- Succeeded by: 11 others

Personal details
- Born: January 4, 1870 Elkhart, Indiana
- Died: November 11, 1951 (aged 81) Cincinnati, Ohio
- Party: Democratic
- Education: Case Western Reserve University; Lane Theological Seminary; Oberlin College

Herbert Seely Bigelow (January 4, 1870 – November 11, 1951) was a U.S. representative from Ohio for one term from 1937 to 1939.

== Life and career ==
Born in Elkhart, Indiana, Bigelow attended the public schools, and Oberlin College, Oberlin, Ohio. He was graduated from Western Reserve University, Cleveland, Ohio, in 1894. He moved to Cincinnati, Ohio, and studied at Lane Theological Seminary. Ordained as a Congregational minister in 1895, he became pastor of the Vine Street Congregational Church in Cincinnati, Ohio. Lost election for Ohio Secretary of State in 1902. He served as delegate to the fourth constitutional convention of Ohio in 1912, serving as president. He served as member of the State house of representatives in 1913 and 1914.

According to a news item in the Oct. 30, 1917 Chicago Tribune, "Herbert S. Bigelow, pacifist, Socialist, head of the People's church of Cincinnati, and a member of the People's council ... was horsewhipped near Florence, Ky., ... by a game of men gowned in Ku Klux fashion." According to the treating doctor, Bigelow had been given at least 40 lashes. Bigelow is quoted as saying, "An experience of this kind shakes one's faith in the doctrine of non-resistance. It has converted me, at least temporarily, to the gospel of preparedness."

He served in the Cincinnati City Council 1936.

Bigelow was elected as a Democrat to the Seventy-fifth Congress (January 3, 1937 – January 3, 1939). He was an unsuccessful candidate for reelection in 1938 to the Seventy-sixth Congress. He served as member of the city council in 1940 and 1941. He resumed his duties as pastor of the Vine Street Congregational Church (Peoples Church), Cincinnati, Ohio, where he died November 11, 1951. He remains were cremated and the ashes scattered over his farm near Forestville, Ohio.

== Sources ==
- United States Congress. "Herbert S. Bigelow (id: B000454)". Biographical Directory of the United States Congress.

U.S. House of Representatives
Preceded by William E. Hess	Member of the U.S. House of Representatives from Ohio's 2nd congressional district 1937–1939	Succeeded by William E. Hess
