= Eugene P. Ruehlmann =

American politician from Ohio

Mayor of Cincinnati
- In office 1967–1971
- Preceded by: Walt Bachrach
- Succeeded by: Bill Gradison

Personal details
- Born: Eugene Peter Ruehlmann; February 23, 1925 Cincinnati, Ohio, U.S.
- Died: June 8, 2013 (aged 88) Cincinnati, Ohio, U.S.
- Spouse: Virginia Ruehlmann (nee Juergens)
- Children: 8
- Education: University of Cincinnati, Harvard Law School
- Military career
- Allegiance: United States
- Branch: United States Marine Corps

Eugene Peter Ruehlmann (February 23, 1925 – June 8, 2013) was an American lawyer and politician. He was the Mayor of Cincinnati, Ohio, from 1967 to 1971.

== Early life and education ==
Ruehlmann was born in Cincinnati, Ohio, the son of John and Hattie Ruehlmann. Ruehlmann had nine siblings. In 1943, he graduated from Western Hills High School. In 1948, Ruehlmann earned his bachelor's degree in political science from the University of Cincinnati, where he also was awarded the McKibbin Medal from the College of Arts and Sciences. Ruehlmann was a member of Beta Theta Pi and the varsity football team. He then served in the United States Marine Corps during World War II. In 1950, Ruehlmann earned his law degree from Harvard Law School.

== Career ==
Ruehlmann was a founder of the Strauss, Troy and Ruehlmann law firm in Cincinnati.

In 1959, Ruehlmann was elected to Cincinnati City Council and then served as Mayor of Cincinnati from 1967 to 1971. As mayor, he helped to bring professional football to the city, and was among those who negotiated a deal that resulted in the construction of Riverfront Stadium, where the Cincinnati Bengals and Cincinnati Reds played. He is also credited with reaching out to the African American community and helping to heal the city after race riots in 1967 and 1968, following the assassination of Martin Luther King Jr.

Ruehlmann was a member of the Republican Party. In the 1990s, he served as a chairman of the Hamilton County Republican Party.

== Personal life and death ==
Ruehlmann's wife was Virginia Ruehlmann (née Juergens), who died in 2008. They had eight children.

On June 8, 2013, Ruehlmann died in Cincinnati at the age of 88.

== Awards ==
- 1998 Great Living Cincinnatian Award. Presented by the Cincinnati USA Regional Chamber.
