= Ambrose E. B. Stephens =

American politician (1862–1927)

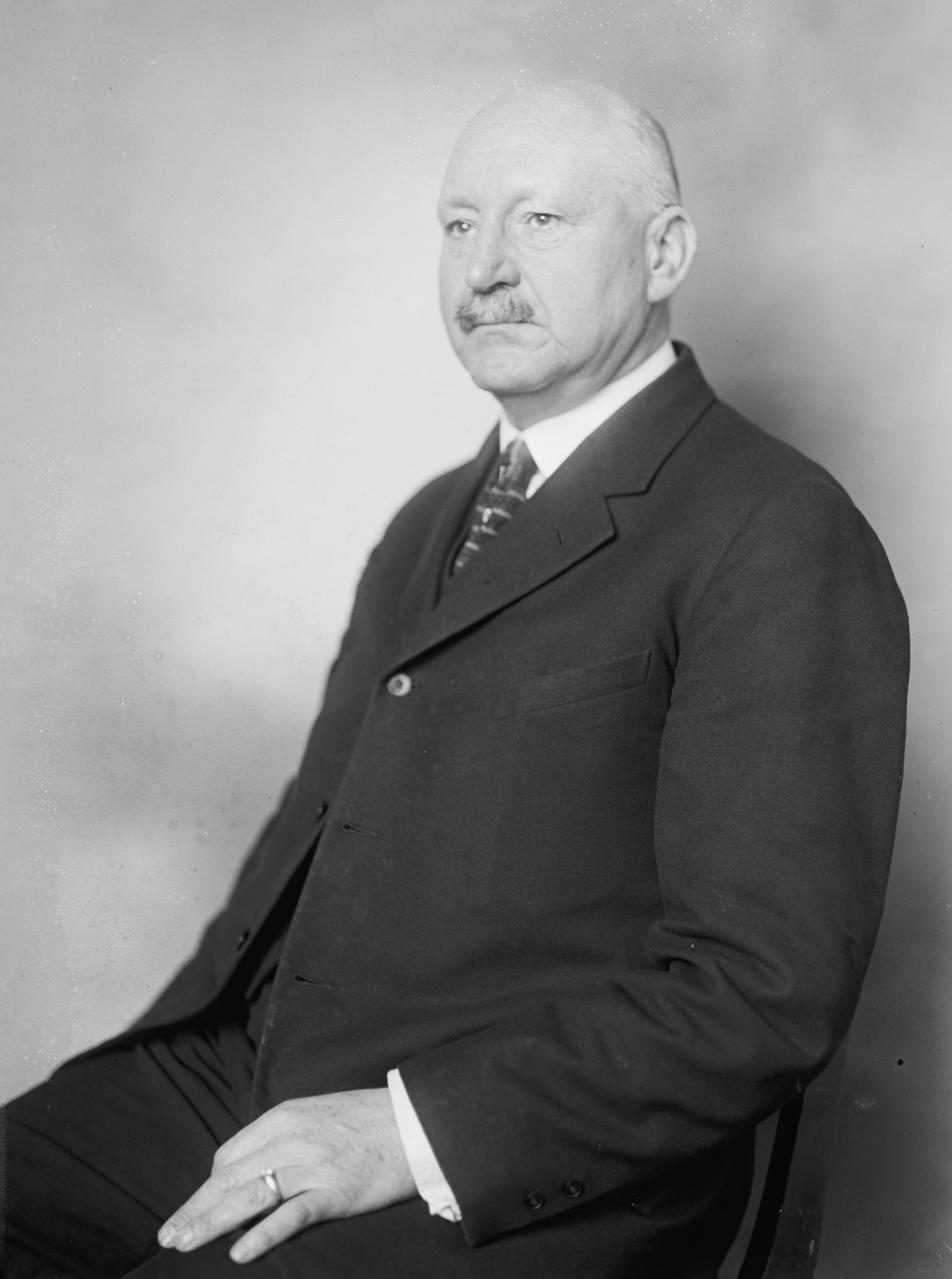
- Stephens, 1918–1921

Member of the U.S. House of Representatives from Ohio's 2nd district
- In office March 4, 1919 – February 12, 1927
- Preceded by: Victor Heintz
- Succeeded by: Charles Tatgenhorst, Jr.

Personal details
- Born: Ambrose Everett Burnside Stephens; June 3, 1862 Crosby Township, Ohio
- Died: February 12, 1927 (aged 64) North Bend, Ohio
- Resting place: Maple Grove Cemetery, Cleves, Ohio
- Party: Republican
- Education: Chickering's Institute

Ambrose Everett Burnside Stephens (June 3, 1862 – February 12, 1927) was an American lawyer and politician who served four terms as a U.S. representative from Ohio from 1919 to 1927.

== Early life and career ==
Born in Crosby Township, Ohio, Stephens attended the public schools and Chickering's Institute of Cincinnati. He studied law, was admitted to the bar in 1902 and commenced practice in Cincinnati. He served as captain in the Ohio National Guard from 1901 to 1903 and colonel in 1910 and 1911. He served as clerk of the Hamilton County Courts from 1911 to 1917.

== Congress ==
Stephens was elected as a Republican to the Sixty-sixth and to the three succeeding Congresses and served from March 4, 1919, until his death in 1927. He had been re-elected to the Seventieth Congress.

== Death ==
He died in North Bend, Ohio, February 12, 1927. He was interred in Maple Grove Cemetery, Cleves, Ohio.

== See also ==
- List of members of the United States Congress who died in office (1900–1949)

== Sources ==
- United States Congress. "Ambrose E. B. Stephens (id: S000855)". Biographical Directory of the United States Congress.

U.S. House of Representatives
Preceded by Victor Heintz	Member of the U.S. House of Representatives from Ohio's 2nd congressional district 1919–1927	Succeeded by Charles Tatgenhorst, Jr.
