= Walt Bachrach =

Former mayor of Cincinnati

Walton Howard Bachrach

Mayor of Cincinnati
- In office 1960–1967
- Governor: Michael DiSalle (1959–1963); Jim Rhodes (1963–1971)
- Preceded by: Donald D. Clancy
- Succeeded by: Eugene P. Ruehlmann

Cincinnati City Council
- In office 1953–1967

Personal details
- Born: December 22, 1904 Cincinnati, Ohio, USA
- Died: December 17, 1989 (aged 84) Tucson, Arizona, USA
- Cause of death: Stroke
- Party: Republican Party
- Spouse: Ida May
- Children: 2
- Education: University of Cincinnati
- Profession: Politician
- Salary: $11,000 annually

Walton H. Bachrach (December 22, 1904 – December 17, 1989) was an American businessman, lawyer, and Republican politician who served as the mayor of Cincinnati from 1961 to 1967 and on the City Council from 1953 to 1967.

== Early life ==
Bachrach was born in Cincinnati, Ohio, on December 22, 1904, the only child of businessman and first-generation American Fisher Bachrach and his wife Rose (née Silverglade). Bachrach's father Fisher came to the United States from Poland with his father Max when he was 6. The family owned a dry goods store. Rose, his mother, was the daughter of Meyer Silverglade, a restauranteer who opened and operated the short-lived Hub Cafe. After Fisher and Rose married, they opened the Wheel Cafe in 1903, a restaurant that became a Cincinnati landmark for nearly a century. They later owned and operated a six-story hotel, called Hotel Walton, before closing it in 1926.

For more than 20 years, Bachrach and his parents lived in the now-defunct Vernon Manor hotel; his childhood bedroom later became the base of his political office. He attended Guilford School, then Culver Military Academy in Indiana, where he was part of the Black Horse Troop, an honor guard organization, for four years. After finishing high school, he attended Washington and Lee University before transferring to and graduating from University of Cincinnati's pre-law program in 1929.

Bachrach joined the Gusweiler, Foster, and Lambert law firm after graduating from college and stayed for 4 years. Among his colleagues were Amos Foster and Judge Scott Gusweiler. He then worked in the county prosecutor's office under Lou Schneider for 2 years, followed by 2 years working with Elmer Hunsiker as a chief deputy clerk.

Bachrach left his budding law career in 1937 to help run the Wheel Cafe while his father turned his focus to the Sherbrook Distributing Company (originally the American Beauty Malt Company), which he founded with business partner Isaac Feld towards the end of American prohibition. His father died in a car accident on December 9, 1938. Bachrach dedicated more than 15 years of his life working as vice president of the Wheel Cafe, while his maternal uncle Abe served as president. From 1939 to 1947, his mother Rose ran a Jewish bakery in Avondale while also helping with the restaurant. The Wheel was the "first restaurant in Cincinnati to sign a contract with the culinary trade unions," and did a lot of business with Cincinnati Reds fans after each game. Before retiring from politics in 1967, Bachrach sold the restaurant; unfortunately, due partially to the baseball strikes in 1980 and 1981, the Wheel folded and closed in August 1981.

His mother died on May 19, 1986, at age 103 at Cincinnati's Jewish Hospital.

== Politics ==
In 1929, Bachrach became a Republican precinct executive, which he acknowledged as the start of his political career. As a politically and socially active young man, he quickly became well-known, and in 1935 was elected without opposition as secretary of the Republican Club of Hamilton County. In 1953, he was selected as a Republican nominee alongside Bruce McClure and William Cody Kelly to fill three vacant seats on the City Council. Prior to his election, Paul Kunkel served as his campaign manager. He became the GOP floor leader and later served as Donald D. Clancy's vice mayor between 1956 and 1961. In 1961, Clancy stepped down to serve on the US House of Representatives and Bachrach succeeded him as mayor. He was the 42nd mayor of Cincinnati and the 4th Jew to hold the position. Eugene P. Ruehlmann served as his vice mayor and succeeded him as the Council's GOP floor leader.

In December 1966, he announced his intent to run for his fourth term as mayor; the following month, however, he shared that he would retire at the end of his term in November 1967. Halfway through his final year, the 1967 race riots occurred in Cincinnati. He mainly stayed out of the riot conversations, but did urge protestors to be good citizens and obey the law. After two days of fires and looting, Bachrach asked Governor Jim Rhodes to send the Ohio Army National Guard to relieve and support the overwhelmed local police forces. He made the request based on suggestions from Police Chief Schott and Safety Director Henry Sandman. 800 soldiers from the first battalion of the 147th Regiment showed up not long after to aid the 1,500 city, county, and suburban Ohio police attempting to keep things under control.

Bachrach did very little decision-making during his time in office and has been referred to as a ceremonial mayor by many, including by himself. He told reporters that everyone has a different view of what responsibilities a mayor should have and felt that "a mayor cannot be both the ceremonial head of the city and an executive decision maker." Despite this, he did serve on a number of committees and boards, including the Firemen's Relief and Pension Fund Board of Trustees, the City Retirement System Board of Trustees, and the Police Relief and Pension Fund Board of Trustees. He was also the City Council's representative on the OKI transportation committee. Among his accomplishments were the funding and building of the Cincinnati Convention-Exposition Center; fundraising for the Riverfront Stadium, for which construction began in 1968; and jumpstarting a downtown renewal program. Overall, he served as mayor for 6 years over 3 terms and was part of the City Council for 14 years. He was succeeded as mayor by his vice mayor, Eugene P. Ruehlmann.

== Personal life ==
Bachrach and his wife Ida May married around 1930 and had two daughters, Margaret "Peggy" and Martha. After he retired, he and his wife moved to Tucson, where they had vacationed as a family when their children were young. He was a loyal Cincinnati Reds fan and was delighted several times by the opportunity to throw the ceremonial first pitch of the season. He was also a lifelong member of Rockdale Temple.

In 1933, Bachrach was appointed Chairman of the Elks' Orphanage Christmas Committee and in 1935 was named the new "dictator" of Cincinnati Lodge No. 2.

Bachrach died of a stroke at the Valley House Nursing Home in Tucson in 1989. At the time of his death, he had 4 grandchildren and 2 great-grandchildren. His wife Ida died July 1, 1993.

Preceded by Donald D. Clancy	Mayor of Cincinnati, Ohio; 1960-1967	Succeeded by Eugene P. Ruehlmann
