= Ohio's 2nd congressional district =

U.S. House district for Ohio

Coordinates: 39°N 84°W

- Interactive map of district boundaries
- Representative: David Taylor; R–Amelia
- Distribution: 73.38% urban; 26.62% rural
- Population (2025): 795,132
- Median household income: $71,699
- Ethnicity: 91.5% White; 3.9% Two or more races; 2.0% Black; 1.5% Hispanic; 0.6% Asian; 0.5% other
- Cook PVI: R+24

Ohio's 2nd congressional district is a district in southern Ohio. It is currently represented by Republican David Taylor.

The district includes all of Adams, Brown, Pike, Clermont, Highland, Clinton, Ross, Pickaway, Hocking, Vinton, Jackson, Gallia, Meigs, Lawrence, and Scioto counties, as well as parts of Fayette county. With a Cook Partisan Voting Index rating of R+24, it is the most Republican district in Ohio and the Northern United States overall.

== Composition ==
For the 118th and successive Congresses (based on redistricting following the 2020 census), the district contains all or portions of the following counties, townships, and municipalities:

Adams County (21)

All 21 townships and municipalities

Brown County (25)

All 25 townships and municipalities

Clermont County (25)

All 25 townships and municipalities

Clinton County (22)

All 22 townships and municipalities

Fayette County (2)

Green Township, Perry Township

Gallia County (21)

All 21 townships and municipalities

Highland County (25)

All 25 townships and municipalities

Hocking County (15)

All 15 townships and municipalities

Jackson County (16)

All 16 townships and municipalities

Lawrence County (21)

All 21 townships and municipalities

Meigs County (17)

All 17 townships and municipalities

Pickaway County (25)

All 25 townships and municipalities

Pike County (17)

All 17 townships and municipalities

Ross County (26)

All 26 townships and municipalities

Scioto County (21)

All 21 townships and municipalities

Vinton County (16)

All 16 townships and municipalities

== Recent election results from statewide races ==
=== 2023-2027 boundaries ===
Year	Office	Results
2008	President	McCain 59% - 39%
2012	President	Romney 61% - 39%
2016	President	Trump 70% - 26%
2016	Senate	Portman 71% - 25%
2018	Senate	Renacci 63% - 37%
2018	Governor	DeWine 66% - 31%
2018	Secretary of State	LaRose 66% - 31%
2018	Treasurer	Sprague 69% - 31%
2018	Auditor	Faber 65% - 31%
2018	Attorney General	Yost 69% - 31%
2020	President	Trump 72% - 27%
2022	Senate	Vance 70% - 30%
2022	Governor	DeWine 77% - 23%
2022	Secretary of State	LaRose 75% - 24%
2022	Treasurer	Sprague 75% - 25%
2022	Auditor	Faber 75% - 25%
2022	Attorney General	Yost 76% - 24%
2024	President	Trump 73% - 26%
2024	Senate	Moreno 67% - 29%

=== 2027–2033 boundaries ===
Year	Office	Results
2008	President	McCain 56% - 42%
2012	President	Romney 58% - 42%
2016	President	Trump 66% - 29%
2016	Senate	Portman 67% - 29%
2018	Senate	Renacci 59% - 41%
2018	Governor	DeWine 63% - 34%
2018	Attorney General	Yost 65% - 35%
2020	President	Trump 69% - 30%
2022	Senate	Vance 67% - 33%
2022	Governor	DeWine 74% - 26%
2022	Secretary of State	LaRose 71% - 27%
2022	Treasurer	Sprague 72% - 28%
2022	Auditor	Faber 71% - 29%
2022	Attorney General	Yost 73% - 27%
2024	President	Trump 71% - 29%
2024	Senate	Moreno 65% - 31%

== List of members representing the district ==
Member	Party	Year(s)	Cong ress	Electoral history	Counties represented
District established March 4, 1813
John Alexander (Xenia)	Democratic-Republican	March 4, 1813 – March 3, 1817	13th 14th	Elected in 1812. Re-elected in 1814. Lost re-election.	
John Wilson Campbell (West Union)	Democratic-Republican	March 4, 1817 – March 3, 1823	15th 16th 17th	Elected in 1816. Re-elected in 1818. Re-elected in 1820. Redistricted to the 5th district.	
Thomas R. Ross (Lebanon)	Democratic-Republican	March 4, 1823 – March 3, 1825	18th	Redistricted from the 1st district and re-elected in 1822. Lost re-election.	
John Woods (Hamilton)	Anti-Jacksonian	March 4, 1825 – March 3, 1829	19th 20th	Elected in 1824. Re-elected in 1826. Lost re-election.	
James Shields (Dicks Mills)	Jacksonian	March 4, 1829 – March 3, 1831	21st	Elected in 1828. [data missing]	
Thomas Corwin (Lebanon)	Anti-Jacksonian	March 4, 1831 – March 3, 1833	22nd	Elected in 1830. Redistricted to the 4th district.	
Taylor Webster (Hamilton)	Jacksonian	March 4, 1833 – March 3, 1837	23rd 24th 25th	Elected in 1832. Re-elected in 1834. Re-elected in 1836. [data missing]	
Taylor Webster (Hamilton)	Democratic	March 4, 1837 – March 3, 1839	23rd 24th 25th	Elected in 1832. Re-elected in 1834. Re-elected in 1836. [data missing]	
John B. Weller (Hamilton)	Democratic	March 4, 1839 – March 3, 1845	26th 27th 28th	Elected in 1838. Re-elected in 1840. Re-elected in 1843. [data missing]	
Francis A. Cunningham (Eaton)	Democratic	March 4, 1845 – March 3, 1847	29th	Elected in 1844. [data missing]	
David Fisher (Wilmington)	Whig	March 4, 1847 – March 3, 1849	30th	Elected in 1846. [data missing]	
Lewis D. Campbell (Hamilton)	Whig	March 4, 1849 – March 3, 1853	31st 32nd	Elected in 1848. Re-elected in 1850. Redistricted to the 3rd district.	
John Scott Harrison (Cleves)	Whig	March 4, 1853 – March 3, 1855	33rd 34th	Elected in 1852. Re-elected in 1854. [data missing]	
John Scott Harrison (Cleves)	Anti-Nebraska	March 4, 1855 – March 3, 1857	33rd 34th	Elected in 1852. Re-elected in 1854. [data missing]	
William S. Groesbeck (Cincinnati)	Democratic	March 4, 1857 – March 3, 1859	35th	Elected in 1856. [data missing]	
John A. Gurley (Cincinnati)	Republican	March 4, 1859 – March 3, 1863	36th 37th	Elected in 1858. Re-elected in 1860. [data missing]	
Alexander Long (Cincinnati)	Democratic	March 4, 1863 – March 3, 1865	38th	Elected in 1862. [data missing]	
Rutherford B. Hayes (Cincinnati)	Republican	March 4, 1865 – July 20, 1867	39th 40th	Elected in 1864. Re-elected in 1866. Retired to run for Governor of Ohio.	
Vacant		July 20, 1867 – November 21, 1867	40th		
Samuel Fenton Cary (Cincinnati)	Independent Republican	November 21, 1867 – March 3, 1869	40th	Elected to finish Hayes's term. [data missing]	
Job E. Stevenson (Cincinnati)	Republican	March 4, 1869 – March 3, 1873	41st 42nd	Elected in 1868. Re-elected in 1870. [data missing]	
Henry B. Banning (Cincinnati)	Liberal Republican	March 4, 1873 – March 3, 1875	43rd 44th 45th	Elected in 1872. Re-elected in 1874. Re-elected in 1876. [data missing]	
Henry B. Banning (Cincinnati)	Democratic	March 4, 1875 – March 3, 1879	43rd 44th 45th	Elected in 1872. Re-elected in 1874. Re-elected in 1876. [data missing]	
Thomas L. Young (Cincinnati)	Republican	March 4, 1879 – March 3, 1883	46th 47th	Elected in 1878. Re-elected in 1880. [data missing]	
Isaac M. Jordan (Cincinnati)	Democratic	March 4, 1883 – March 3, 1885	48th	Elected in 1882. [data missing]	
Charles Elwood Brown (Cincinnati)	Republican	March 4, 1885 – March 3, 1889	49th 50th	Elected in 1884. Re-elected in 1886. [data missing]	
John A. Caldwell (Cincinnati)	Republican	March 4, 1889 – May 4, 1894	51st 52nd 53rd	Elected in 1888. Re-elected in 1890. Re-elected in 1892. Resigned when elected Mayor of Cincinnati.	
Vacant		May 4, 1894 – December 3, 1894	53rd		
Jacob H. Bromwell (Cincinnati)	Republican	December 3, 1894 – March 3, 1903	53rd 54th 55th 56th 57th	Elected to finish Caldwell's term. Re-elected in 1894. Re-elected in 1896. Re-elected in 1898. Re-elected in 1900. [data missing]	
Herman P. Goebel (Cincinnati)	Republican	March 4, 1903 – March 3, 1911	58th 59th 60th 61st	Elected in 1902. Re-elected in 1904. Re-elected in 1906. Re-elected in 1908. [data missing]	
Alfred G. Allen (Cincinnati)	Democratic	March 4, 1911 – March 3, 1917	62nd 63rd 64th	Elected in 1910. Re-elected in 1912. Re-elected in 1914. [data missing]	
Victor Heintz (Cincinnati)	Republican	March 4, 1917 – March 3, 1919	65th	Elected in 1916. Retired.	
Ambrose E. B. Stephens (North Bend)	Republican	March 4, 1919 – February 12, 1927	66th 67th 68th 69th	Elected in 1918. Re-elected in 1920. Re-elected in 1922. Re-elected in 1924. Re-elected in 1926. Died.	
Vacant		February 12, 1927 – November 8, 1927	69th 70th		
Charles Tatgenhorst Jr. (Cleves)	Republican	November 8, 1927 – March 3, 1929	70th	Elected to finish Stephens's term. Retired.	
William E. Hess (Cincinnati)	Republican	March 4, 1929 – January 3, 1937	71st 72nd 73rd 74th	Elected in 1928. Re-elected in 1930. Re-elected in 1932. Re-elected in 1934. Lost re-election.	
Herbert S. Bigelow (Cincinnati)	Democratic	January 3, 1937 – January 3, 1939	75th	Elected in 1936. Lost re-election.	
William E. Hess (Cincinnati)	Republican	January 3, 1939 – January 3, 1949	76th 77th 78th 79th 80th	Elected in 1938. Re-elected in 1940. Re-elected in 1942. Re-elected in 1944. Re-elected in 1946. Lost re-election.	
Earl T. Wagner (Cincinnati)	Democratic	January 3, 1949 – January 3, 1951	81st	Elected in 1948. Lost re-election.	
William E. Hess (Cincinnati)	Republican	January 3, 1951 – January 3, 1961	82nd 83rd 84th 85th 86th	Elected in 1950. Re-elected in 1952. Re-elected in 1954. Re-elected in 1956. Re-elected in 1958. Retired.	
Donald D. Clancy (Cincinnati)	Republican	January 3, 1961 – January 3, 1977	87th 88th 89th 90th 91st 92nd 93rd 94th	Elected in 1960. Re-elected in 1962. Re-elected in 1964. Re-elected in 1966. Re-elected in 1968. Re-elected in 1970. Re-elected in 1972. Re-elected in 1974. Lost re-election.	
Tom Luken (Cincinnati)	Democratic	January 3, 1977 – January 3, 1983	95th 96th 97th	Elected in 1976. Re-elected in 1978. Re-elected in 1980. Redistricted to the 1st district.	
Bill Gradison (Cincinnati)	Republican	January 3, 1983 – January 31, 1993	98th 99th 100th 101st 102nd 103rd	Redistricted from the 1st district and re-elected in 1982. Re-elected in 1984. Re-elected in 1986. Re-elected in 1988. Re-elected in 1990. Re-elected in 1992. Resigned.	
Vacant		January 31, 1993 – May 4, 1993	103rd		
Rob Portman (Terrace Park)	Republican	May 4, 1993 – April 29, 2005	103rd 104th 105th 106th 107th 108th 109th	Elected to finish Gradison's term. Re-elected in 1994. Re-elected in 1996. Re-elected in 1998. Re-elected in 2000. Re-elected in 2002. Re-elected in 2004. Resigned to become U.S. Trade Representative.	
Rob Portman (Terrace Park)	Republican	May 4, 1993 – April 29, 2005	103rd 104th 105th 106th 107th 108th 109th	Elected to finish Gradison's term. Re-elected in 1994. Re-elected in 1996. Re-elected in 1998. Re-elected in 2000. Re-elected in 2002. Re-elected in 2004. Resigned to become U.S. Trade Representative.	2003–2013
Vacant		April 29, 2005 – August 2, 2005	109th		2003–2013
Jean Schmidt (Loveland)	Republican	August 2, 2005 – January 3, 2013	109th 110th 111th 112th	Elected to finish Portman's term. Re-elected in 2006. Re-elected in 2008. Re-elected in 2010. Lost renomination.	2003–2013
Brad Wenstrup (Hillsboro)	Republican	January 3, 2013 – January 3, 2025	113th 114th 115th 116th 117th 118th	Elected in 2012. Re-elected in 2014. Re-elected in 2016. Re-elected in 2018. Re-elected in 2020. Re-elected in 2022. Retired.	2013–2023
Brad Wenstrup (Hillsboro)	Republican	January 3, 2013 – January 3, 2025	113th 114th 115th 116th 117th 118th	Elected in 2012. Re-elected in 2014. Re-elected in 2016. Re-elected in 2018. Re-elected in 2020. Re-elected in 2022. Retired.	2023–2027
David Taylor (Amelia)	Republican	January 3, 2025 – present	119th	Elected in 2024. Re-elected in 2026.	2023–2027

== Election results ==
The following chart shows historic election results.

Year	Democratic	Republican	Other
1920	Thomas H. Morrow: 41,781	✓ A. E. B. Stephens (Incumbent): 47,797	John Partridge: 1,291
1922	John R. Quane: 30,051	✓ A. E. B. Stephens (Incumbent): 39,898	Charles A. Herbst (FL): 4,001
1924	Robert J. O'Donnell: 34,118	✓ A. E. B. Stephens (Incumbent): 47,331	
1926	Robert J. O'Donnell: 26,322	✓ A. E. B. Stephens (Incumbent): 36,608	
1928	James H. Cleveland: 54,332	✓ William E. Hess: 63,605	
1930	Charles W. Sawyer: 45,761	✓ William E. Hess (Incumbent): 46,347	
1932	Edward F. Alexander: 57,258	✓ William E. Hess (Incumbent): 58,971	
1934	Charles E. Miller: 41,701	✓ William E. Hess (Incumbent): 51,171	
1936	✓ Herbert S. Bigelow: 67,213	William E. Hess (Incumbent): 62,546	
1938	Herbert S. Bigelow (Incumbent): 42,773	✓ William E. Hess: 61,480	
1940	James E. O'Connell: 60,410	✓ William E. Hess (Incumbent): 77,769	
1942	Nicholas Bauer: 29,823	✓ William E. Hess (Incumbent): 53,083	
1944	J. Harry Moore: 61,473	✓ William E. Hess (Incumbent): 78,185	
1946	Francis G. Davis: 39,112	✓ William E. Hess (Incumbent): 67,067	
1948	✓ Earl T. Wagner: 75,062	William E. Hess (Incumbent): 66,968	
1950	Earl T. Wagner (Incumbent): 62,542	✓ William E. Hess: 69,543	
1952	Earl T. Wagner: 69,341	✓ William E. Hess (Incumbent): 90,417	
1954	Earl T. Wagner: 49,690	✓ William E. Hess (Incumbent): 69,695	
1956	James T. Dewan: 57,554	✓ William E. Hess (Incumbent): 109,099	
1958	James O. Bradley: 71,674	✓ William E. Hess (Incumbent): 86,656	
1960	H. A. Sand: 87,531	✓ Donald D. Clancy: 118,046	
1962	H. A. Sand: 62,733	✓ Donald D. Clancy (Incumbent): 105,750	
1964	H. A. Sand: 79,824	✓ Donald D. Clancy (Incumbent): 122,487	
1966	Thomas E. Anderson: 42,367	✓ Donald D. Clancy (Incumbent): 102,313	
1968	Don Driehaus: 52,327	✓ Donald D. Clancy (Incumbent): 108,157	
1970	Gerald N. "Jerry" Springer: 60,860	✓ Donald D. Clancy (Incumbent): 77,071	
1972	Penny Manes: 65,237	✓ Donald D. Clancy (Incumbent): 109,961	
1974	Edward W. Wolterman: 67,685	✓ Donald D. Clancy (Incumbent): 71,512	
1976	✓ Thomas A. Luken: 88,178	Donald D. Clancy (Incumbent): 83,459	
1978	✓ Thomas A. Luken (Incumbent) (Incumbent) : 64,522	Stanley J. Aronoff: 58,716	
1980	✓ Thomas A. Luken (Incumbent) (Incumbent) : 103,423	Thearon "Tom" Atkins: 72,693	
1982	William J. Luttmer: 53,169	✓ Willis D. Gradison Jr. (Incumbent): (Note: Redistricting following the 1980 census moved Luken from the 2nd district to this district and Gradison from the first district to the 2nd district.) 97,434	Joseph I. Lombardo: 1,827; Charles K. Shrout Jr. (L): 2,948
1984	Thomas J. Porter: 68,597	✓ Willis D. Gradison Jr. (Incumbent): 149,856	
1986	William F. Stineman: 43,448	✓ Willis D. Gradison Jr. (Incumbent): 105,061	
1988	Chuck R. Stidham: 58,637	✓ Willis D. Gradison Jr. (Incumbent): 153,162	
1990	Tyrone K. Yates: 57,345	✓ Willis D. Gradison Jr. (Incumbent): 103,817	
1992	Thomas R. Chandler: 75,924	✓ Willis D. Gradison Jr. (Incumbent): 177,720	
1993 (Special) (Note: In May 1993, a special election was held to fill the seat to replace Bill Gradison who, three months after his re-election, resigned on January 31, 1993, to become a lobbyist for the insurance industry as president of the Health Insurance Association of America.)	Lee Hornberger: 22,652	✓ Robert J. Portman: 53,020	
1994	Les Mann: 43,730	✓ Robert J. Portman (Incumbent): 150,128	
1996	Thomas R. Chandler: 58,715	✓ Robert J. Portman (Incumbent): 186,853	Kathleen M. McKnight (N): 13,905
1998	Charles W. Sanders: 49,293	✓ Robert J. Portman (Incumbent): 154,344	
2000	Charles W. Sanders: 64,091	✓ Robert J. Portman (Incumbent): 204,184	Robert E. Bidwell (L): 9,266
2002	Charles W. Sanders: 48,785	✓ Robert J. Portman (Incumbent): 139,218	
2004	Charles W. Sanders: 87,156	✓ Robert J. Portman (Incumbent): 221,785	
2005 (Special) (Note: In 2005, a special election was required to fill the seat following Portman's resignation to accept nomination to the office of United States Trade Representative.)	Paul Hackett: 55,151	✓ Jean Schmidt: 59,132	
2006	Victoria Wulsin: 117,595	✓ Jean Schmidt (Incumbent): 120,112	
2008	Victoria Wulsin: 124,076	✓ Jean Schmidt (Incumbent): 148,500	David Krikorian: 58,650; James Condit: 30
2010	Surya Yalamanchili: 80,139	✓ Jean Schmidt (Incumbent): 136,120	Marc Johnson (Libertarian) 15,867
2012	William Smith: 137,082	✓ Brad Wenstrup: 194,299	
2014	Marek Tyszkiewicz: 68,453	✓ Brad Wenstrup (Incumbent): 132,658	
2016	William Smith: 111,694	✓ Brad Wenstrup (Incumbent): 221,193	Janet Everhard (write-in Dem): 7,392
2018	Jill Schiller: 119,333	✓ Brad Wenstrup (Incumbent): 166,714	Jim Condit Jr.: 3,608; David Baker: 8
2020	Jaime Castle: 146,781	✓ Brad Wenstrup (Incumbent): 230,430	
2022	Samantha Meadows: 64,329	✓ Brad Wenstrup(Incumbent): 188,289	
2024	Samantha Meadows: 94,751 (per Ohio Secretary of State)	✓ David Taylor: 262,843 (per Ohio Secretary of State)	Alexander David Schrank: 4

=== 2005 special election ===
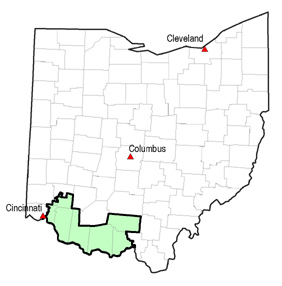
The state of Ohio, showing the second district in 2005.

The district has not elected a Democrat since Tom Luken won a 1974 special election.

On August 2, 2005, elections were held to choose a United States representative to replace Rob Portman, who resigned his seat on April 29, 2005, to become United States Trade Representative. Republican Jean Schmidt candidate defeated Democrat Paul Hackett in a surprisingly close election.

=== 2006 ===
Schmidt defeated Democrat Victoria Wells Wulsin, a doctor from Indian Hill, in the November general election.

=== 2010 ===
Ohio's 2nd Congressional District Election (2010)
Party	Candidate	Votes	%
Republican	Jean Schmidt*	139,027	58.45
Democratic	Surya Yalamanchili	82,431	34.66
Libertarian	Marc Johnston	16,259	6.84
Total votes		237,717	100.00
Turnout			
Republican hold			

=== 2012 ===
Ohio's 2nd congressional district (2012)
Party	Candidate	Votes	%
Republican	Brad Wenstrup	194,296	58.6
Democratic	William Smith	137,077	41.4
Total votes		331,373	100.0
Republican hold			

=== 2014 ===
Ohio's 2nd congressional district (2014)
Party	Candidate	Votes	%
Republican	Brad Wenstrup (incumbent)	132,658	66.0
Democratic	Marek Tyszkiewicz	68,453	34.0
Total votes		201,111	100.0
Republican hold			

=== 2016 ===
Ohio's 2nd congressional district (2016)
Party	Candidate	Votes	%
Republican	Brad Wenstrup (incumbent)	221,193	65.0
Democratic	William R. Smith	111,694	32.8
Independent	Janet Everhard (write-in)	7,392	2.2
Total votes		340,279	100.0
Republican hold			

=== 2018 ===
Ohio's 2nd congressional district (2018)
Party	Candidate	Votes	%
Republican	Brad Wenstrup (incumbent)	166,714	57.6
Democratic	Jill Schiller	119,333	41.2
Green	Jim Condit Jr.	3,606	1.2
Independent	David Baker (write-in)	8	0.0
Total votes		289,661	100.0
Republican hold			

=== 2020 ===
Ohio's 2nd congressional district (2020)
Party	Candidate	Votes	%
Republican	Brad Wenstrup (incumbent)	230,430	61.1
Democratic	Jaime Castle	146,781	38.9
Write-in		37	0.0
Total votes		377,248	100.0
Republican hold			

=== 2022 ===
Ohio's 2nd congressional district (2022)
Party	Candidate	Votes	%
Republican	Brad Wenstrup (incumbent)	192,117	74.5
Democratic	Samantha Meadows	65,745	25.5
Total votes		257,862	100.0
Republican hold			

=== 2024 ===
Ohio's 2nd congressional district (2024)
Party	Candidate	Votes	%
Republican	David Taylor	268,211	73.6
Democratic	Samantha Meadows	96,401	26.4
Total votes		364,612	100.0
Republican hold			

== See also ==
- Ohio's congressional districts
- List of United States congressional districts
