= Alfred G. Allen =

American lawyer and politician (1867–1932)

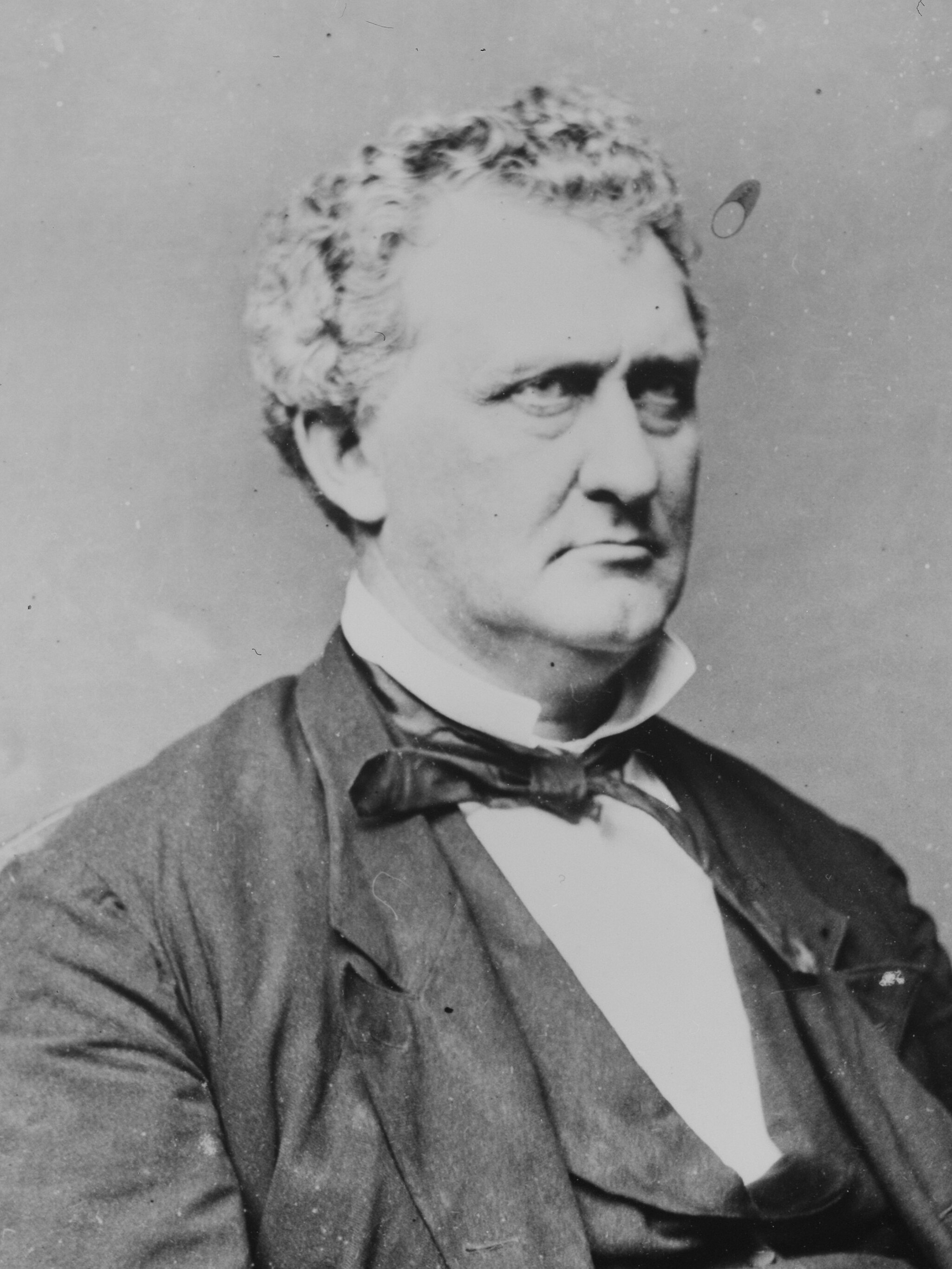

Member of the U.S. House of Representatives from Ohio's 2nd district
- In office March 4, 1911 – March 3, 1917
- Preceded by: Herman P. Goebel
- Succeeded by: Victor Heintz

Personal details
- Born: Alfred Gaither Allen; July 23, 1867 Wilmington, Ohio, U.S.
- Died: December 9, 1932 (aged 65) Cincinnati, Ohio, U.S.
- Resting place: Sugar Grove Cemetery, Wilmington
- Party: Democratic
- Spouse: Clara B. Forbes
- Children: 2
- Education: Cincinnati Law School

Alfred Gaither Allen (July 23, 1867 – December 9, 1932) was an American lawyer and politician who served three terms as a U.S. representative from Ohio from 1911 to 1917.

== Biography ==
Born on a farm near Wilmington, Ohio, Allen attended public schools there. He graduated from Wilmington High School in 1886 and from the Cincinnati Law School in 1890, where he was Phi Delta Phi. He was admitted to the bar in 1890 and commenced practice in Cincinnati, Ohio.

He served as United States commissioner from 1896 to 1900 and as delegate to the Democratic State conventions in Columbus in 1901 and 1908. He was a member of the city council from 1906 to 1908, and a member of the board of the sinking-fund trustees of Cincinnati from 1908 to 1910.

=== Congress ===
Allen was elected as a Democrat to the Sixty-second, Sixty-third, and Sixty-fourth Congresses (March 4, 1911 - March 4, 1917).

=== Later career ===
He declined renomination in 1916, and resumed his earlier profession in Cincinnati. He served as delegate to the Democratic National Convention in San Francisco in 1920. He served as president of the Cincinnati Bar Association in 1925 and 1926.

=== Death and burial ===
He died in Cincinnati, Ohio, December 9, 1932. He remains are interred at the Sugar Grove Cemetery in Wilmington, Ohio.

=== Family ===
On December 10, 1901, Allen married Clara B. Forbes at St. Louis, Missouri. She was the daughter of M. S. Forbes, president of Forbes Brothers' Tea and Spice Company. She graduated from Smith College. They had two children. They were members of the Methodist Episcopal Church.

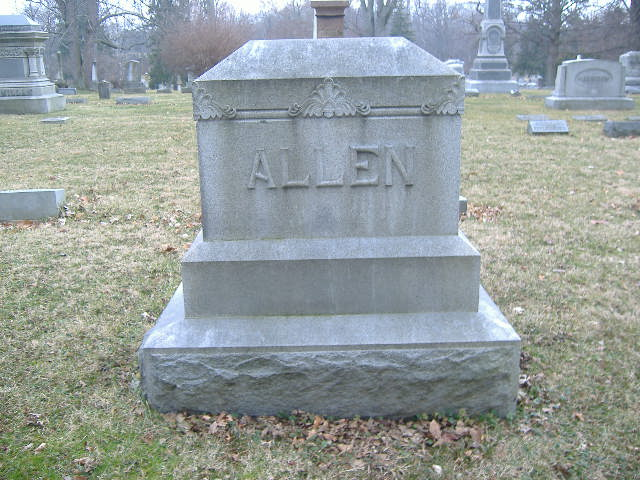
Allen family headstone at Sugar Grove Cemetery in Wilmington, Ohio.

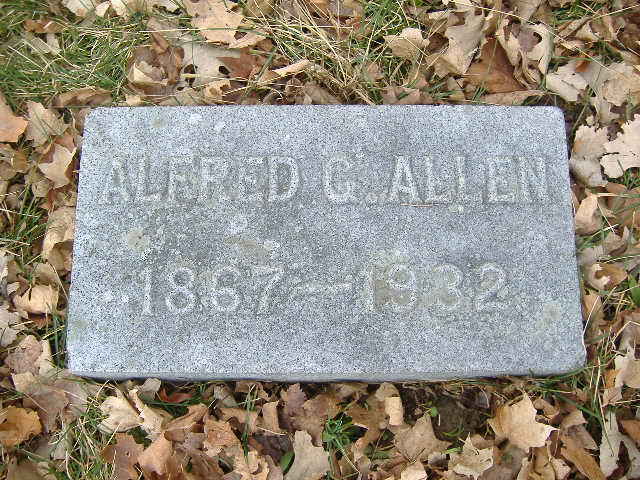
Gravemarker of Alfred G. Allen.

== Sources ==
- United States Congress. "Alfred G. Allen (id: A000111)". Biographical Directory of the United States Congress.

U.S. House of Representatives
Preceded by Herman P. Goebel	Member of the U.S. House of Representatives from Ohio's 2nd congressional district 1911–1917	Succeeded by Victor Heintz
