= Jacob H. Bromwell =

American politician (1848–1924)

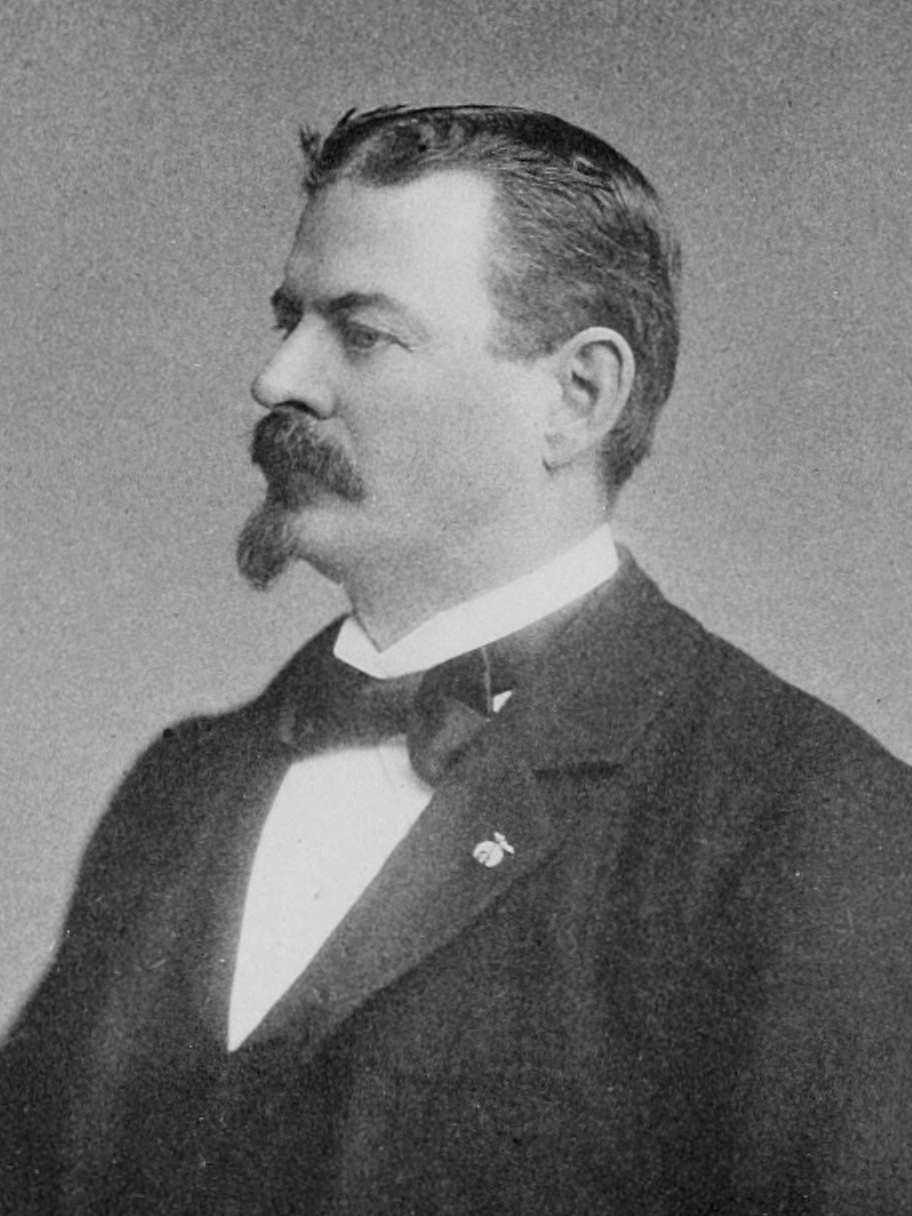

Member of the U.S. House of Representatives from Ohio's 2nd district
- In office December 3, 1894 – March 3, 1903
- Preceded by: John A. Caldwell
- Succeeded by: Herman P. Goebel

Personal details
- Born: Jacob Henry Bromwell; May 11, 1848 Cincinnati, Ohio, US
- Died: June 4, 1924 (aged 76) Wyoming, Ohio, US
- Resting place: Spring Grove Cemetery
- Party: Republican
- Education: Cincinnati Law School

Jacob Henry Bromwell (May 11, 1848 – June 4, 1924) was an American lawyer, educator and politician who served as a U.S. representative from Ohio from 1894 to 1903.

== Biography ==
Born in Cincinnati, Ohio, Bromwell resided during his boyhood in Newport, Kentucky. He attended the public schools of Cincinnati and graduated from Hughes High School in 1864. He taught in the public schools of southern Indiana and Cincinnati for twenty-three years. He was graduated from Cincinnati Law School in 1870. He was admitted to the bar of Hamilton County in 1888 and commenced practice in Cincinnati. He served as mayor of Wyoming, Ohio from 1880 to 1886. He served as assistant county solicitor of Hamilton County 1888–1892.

=== Congress ===
Bromwell was elected as a Republican to the Fifty-third Congress to fill the vacancy caused by the resignation of John A. Caldwell. He was re-elected to the Fifty-fourth and the three succeeding Congresses and served from December 3, 1894, to March 3, 1903.

=== Later career ===
He was not a candidate for renomination in 1902. He resumed the practice of law in Cincinnati. He served as judge of the court of common pleas of Hamilton County 1907–1913.

He declined to be a candidate for renomination. He again engaged in the practice of law.

=== Death ===
He died in Wyoming, Ohio, on June 4, 1924. He was interred in Spring Grove Cemetery, Cincinnati, Ohio.

== Sources ==
- United States Congress. "Jacob H. Bromwell (id: B000866)". Biographical Directory of the United States Congress.

U.S. House of Representatives
Preceded by John A. Caldwell	Member of the U.S. House of Representatives from Ohio's 2nd congressional district 1894–1903	Succeeded by Herman P. Goebel
