= Donald D. Clancy =

American politician (1921–2007)

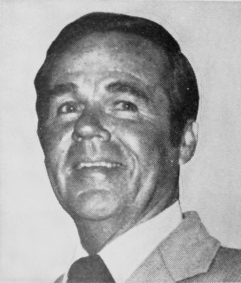

Member of the U.S. House of Representatives from Ohio's 2nd district
- In office January 3, 1961 – January 3, 1977
- Preceded by: William E. Hess
- Succeeded by: Tom Luken

Mayor of Cincinnati
- In office 1957–1960
- Preceded by: Charles Phelps Taft II
- Succeeded by: Walt Bachrach

Personal details
- Born: July 24, 1921 Cincinnati, Ohio, U.S.
- Died: June 12, 2007 (aged 85) Montgomery, Ohio, U.S.
- Party: Republican
- Education: Xavier University; Cincinnati Law School

Donald D. Clancy (July 24, 1921 – June 12, 2007) was a Republican member of the United States House of Representatives. He represented the 2nd district of Ohio for eight terms from 1961 until 1977.

== Early life and education ==
Clancy was born in Cincinnati, in Ohio's Hamilton County. He graduated from Elder High School, attended Xavier University, and completed his studies at Cincinnati Law School in 1948.

== Career ==
In 1948, Clancy was admitted to the bar and commenced the practice of law in Cincinnati. He served on the city council from 1952 until 1960; from 1958 until 1960 he was the mayor as well as the chairman of the Cincinnati Planning Commission.

Clancy defeated future television talk show personality Jerry Springer in his 1970 re-election campaign. Clancy received approximately 56% of the vote to Springer's 44%.

=== Congress ===
Beginning with the Eighty-seventh Congress, Clancy was elected to congressional office for eight consecutive terms. When he lost his bid for reelection in 1976, he resumed the practice of law in Cincinnati.

Patty Clancy, his daughter, was an Ohio State Senator, representing Ohio's 8th Senate district.

== Death ==
Clancy died on June 12, 2007, from complications of Parkinson's disease.

Political offices
Preceded by Charles Phelps Taft II	Mayor of Cincinnati, Ohio; 1957–1960	Succeeded by Walton H. Bachrach
U.S. House of Representatives
Preceded by William E. Hess	Member of the U.S. House of Representatives from Ohio's 2nd congressional district 1961–1977	Succeeded by Tom Luken
