= Earl T. Wagner =

American politician

Earl Thomas Wagner

Member of the U.S. House of Representatives from Ohio's 2nd district
- In office January 3, 1949 – January 3, 1951
- Preceded by: William E. Hess
- Succeeded by: William E. Hess

Personal details
- Born: April 27, 1908 Cincinnati, Ohio
- Died: March 6, 1990 (aged 81) Cincinnati, Ohio
- Party: Democratic
- Education: Salmon P. Chase College of Law

Earl Thomas Wagner (April 27, 1908 – March 6, 1990) was an American lawyer and politician who served one term as a U.S. representative from Ohio from 1949 to 1951.

== Biography ==
Born in Cincinnati, Ohio, Wagner attended parochial and public schools. He was graduated from the Salmon P. Chase College of Law, Cincinnati, Ohio, in 1930. He was admitted to the bar in September 1930 and commenced the practice of law in Cincinnati, Ohio. He served as district counsel of Home Owners' Loan Corporation in 1933 and 1934. He served as special counsel to the Ohio Attorney General in 1937 and 1938. City solicitor of Sharonville, Ohio, in 1938 and 1939. He served as member of the board of education of the Cincinnati School district 1944-1947.

=== Congress ===
Wagner was elected as a Democrat to the Eighty-first Congress (January 3, 1949 – January 3, 1951). He was an unsuccessful candidate for reelection in 1950 and for election to the United States House of Representatives in 1952 and 1954.

=== After Congress ===
He resumed the practice of law. City solicitor of Addyston, Ohio, in 1952 and 1953. He served as general counsel for a savings and loan bank in Cincinnati. He was a resident of Cincinnati, until his death there on March 6, 1990.

== Sources ==
- United States Congress. "Earl T. Wagner (id: W000019)". Biographical Directory of the United States Congress.

U.S. House of Representatives
Preceded by William E. Hess	Member of the U.S. House of Representatives from Ohio's 2nd congressional district 1949–1951	Succeeded by William E. Hess
