= Russell Wilson (American politician) =

American politician (1876–1946)

37th Mayor of Cincinnati
- In office 1930–1938
- Preceded by: Murray Seasongood
- Succeeded by: James Garfield Stewart

Cincinnati City Council
- In office 1929–1946

Personal details
- Born: November 10, 1876 Cincinnati, Ohio, US
- Died: November 27, 1946 (aged 70) Cincinnati, Ohio, US
- Resting place: Spring Grove Cemetery. Cincinnati, Ohio
- Party: Charter Party
- Education: Princeton University; University of Cincinnati College of Law
- Occupation: Politician, newspaper editor, attorney
- Nickname: Russ

Russell "Russ" Wilson (November 10, 1876 — November 27, 1946) was an American politician and newspaper editor. He was the mayor of Cincinnati, Ohio from 1930 to 1937. He was a founder of Sigma Sigma honor society in 1898.

== Early life ==
Wilson was born November 10, 1876, in the West End of Cincinnati, Ohio. His parents were Lucy Thorpe and Moses F. Wilson, a polic court and common pleas judge. Wilson attended public schools in Cincinnati, including the 12th District School and Franklin High School.

Wilson enrolled in the Princeton University. After one year, he transferred to the University of Cincinnati College of Law. At Cincinnati, he was involved with several campus organizations. He joined the Inner Temple Quiz Club in October 1897. He was a founder of Sigma Sigma honorary society in the summer of 1898. In October 1898, he played the interlocutor in a minstrel show produced by the University Glee and Mandolin Clubs. In 1900, he joined the Zeta Psi chapter of the Sigma Chi fraternity. He graduated from the University of Cincinnati with an LLB degree in 1900.

== Career ==
After college, Wilson worked as a lawyer in private practice for two years. He then worked for the Union Savings Bank & Trust in New York as its assistant secretary and trust officer; however, the brokerage firm went out of business.

In August 1908, Wilson became a reporter for The Cincinnati Post. He started writing general stories but advanced to covering theater as the dramatic editor. In 1910, he moved to The Cincinnati Times-Star. He wrote editorials and was a drama critic for The Cincinnati Times-Star. In 1913, he was promoted to associate editor, working in that capacity until he became a politician in 1929.

Although raised in a Democratic household, Wilson was initially an independent Republican, he wrote editorials against the Cincinnati Charter Party in its early days. He supported William Howard Taft, Woodrow Wilson, Herbert Hoover, and Al Smith. However, after a majority-Charter Party City Council was elected, Russell changed his mind and became a member of the Charter Party.

When Charter movement leader Murry Seasongood announced that he would not run for another term as mayor in 1929, the Charter Committee asked Wilson and others to ask Seasongood to reconsider his decision. The meeting did not change the mayor's mind, but Seasongood convinced Wilson to run for city council. Seasongood campaigned for Wilson who won the election in 1929 with a large percentage. Although Wilson always referred to Seasongood as the head of the Charter Party, Wilson became more popular than the former mayor.

Wilson ran for a second term in 1931. He went on to serve four terms, sixteen years total, on the Cincinnati city council. While on city council, Wilson fought against administrative corruption and supported the enforcement of gambling laws. He chaired the City Planning Committee, the Highways Committee, the Public Hearing Committee, and the Traffic Committee.

He was elected mayor of Cincinnati on January 1, 1930. He served four terms as the mayor, including from 1930 to 1932, 1932 to 1934, 1934 to 1936, and 1936 to 1938. When he ran for reelection, he set a record for the number of first-choice votes on all three occasions. As mayor, he was known for his non-partisan appointments to city positions. He also negotiated a reduction in gas and electric rates; the first reductions in Cincinnati in 35 years. The editorial staff of The Cincinnati Post wrote that although they did not always agree with Wison politically, they had "high respect" for him as mayor and found him to be "polished, scholarly, urbane [with] the democratic touch...He enhanced the city's fame..." He was succeeded as mayor by James Garfield Stewart.

In 1936, Wilson came to national attention after he dubbed President Franklin D. Roosevelt "a rabble raiser with a Harvard accent". In 1940 and 1941, Wilson was head of the Cincinnati chapter of the Committee to Defend America, organized to promote support of Britain and France against Germany. In the fall of 1941, the chapter merged with Cincinnati (Fight for Freeddom) chapter.

Wilson died toward the end of his 4th term on the city council; however, he had already decided not to run for reelection.

== Honors ==
Victor Emmanuel III, King of Italy, made Wilson a knight of the Order of the Crown of Italy. Wilson received an honorary Master of Arts degree from Princeton University. He also received an honorary Doctor of Laws degree from Marietta College.

In November 1898, Wilson was made an honorary member of the Triginta Optioni Fraternity of Hughes High School in Cincinnati. Wilson suggested the fraternity's name when it was organized several years prior.

== Personal life ==
Wilson married Elizabeth Smith at Mount Desert Island, Maine on September 20, 1923. She was the daughter of Judge Samual Smith of Cincinnati. Their children were Samuel Smith Wilson and Perkins Wilson. They lived at 2726 Johnstone Place in the Walnut Hills neighborhood of Cincinnati.

Because of his wit, Wilson was "one of the best after-dinner speakers in the United States" and "one of the best storytellers of his time." In May 1934, he was the keynote speaker for Alumni Day at Princeton, presenting "Universities and Good Government".

Wilson was a director of the Perkins Realty Co. and the Union Central Life Insurance Co. He was a member of the Cincinnati Club, the Commercial Club, the Commonwealth Club, Eagles Lodge, F. & A.M., the Lions Club, the Moose Lodge, the Order of Ahepa, the Princeton Alumni Association, the Queen City Club, Scottish Rite, and the Walnut Hills Lodge. He was president of the Cincinnatus Association, president of the Cincinnati Branch of the Archaeological Institute of America and head of the Cincinnati chapter of the Foreign Policy Association. He was also a member of the Presbyterian Church.

In August 1946, Wilson became ill with a heart condition while staying at his home in Mount Desert Island. After treatment at Christ Hospital in Cincinnati, he returned home in October. He suffered a relapse on November 26 and was taken back to the hospital. On November 27, 1946, Wilson died at the age of 70 years in Christ Hospital. His funeral service was held at his home. Honorary pallbearers included members of the Cincinnati Bar Association, the Cincinnati City Council, the Culver Press Club, and Sigma Chi fraternity.

He was buried in Spring Grove Cemetery in Cincinnati.
