= William E. Hess =

American politician

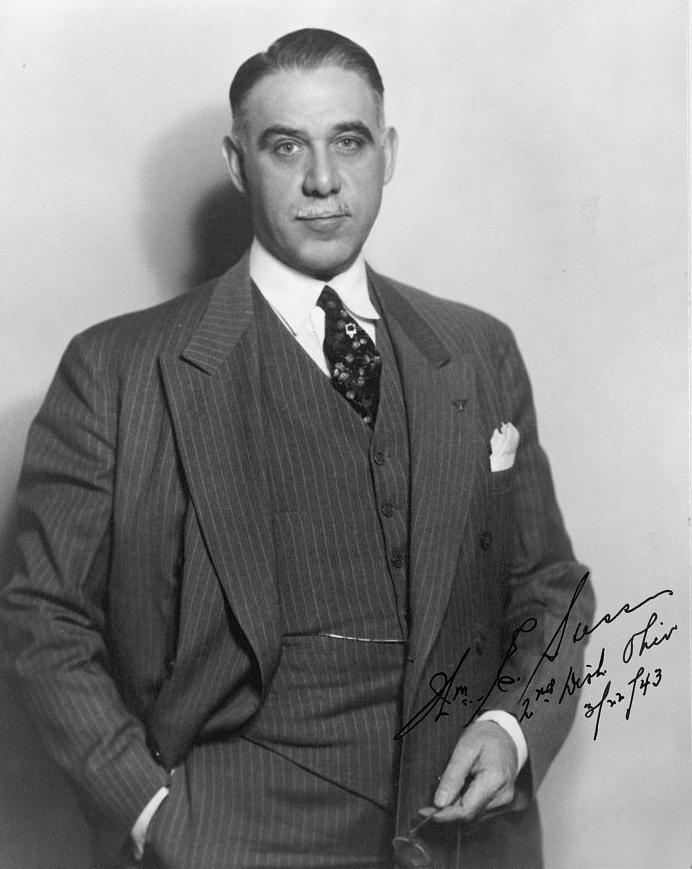
- circa 1943

Member of the U.S. House of Representatives from Ohio's 2nd district
- In office March 4, 1929 – January 3, 1937
- Preceded by: Charles Tatgenhorst Jr.
- Succeeded by: Herbert S. Bigelow
- In office January 3, 1939 – January 3, 1949
- Preceded by: Herbert S. Bigelow
- Succeeded by: Earl T. Wagner
- In office January 3, 1951 – January 3, 1961
- Preceded by: Earl T. Wagner
- Succeeded by: Donald D. Clancy

Personal details
- Born: William Emil Hess; February 13, 1898 Cincinnati, Ohio
- Died: July 14, 1986 (aged 88) Cincinnati, Ohio
- Resting place: Spring Grove Cemetery
- Party: Republican
- Education: University of Cincinnati; Cincinnati Law School

William Emil Hess (February 13, 1898 – July 14, 1986) was an American lawyer, World War I veteran and politician who served three lengthy, non-consecutive stints as a Republican and a U.S. Representative from Ohio between 1929 and 1961.

== Biography ==
Born in Cincinnati, Ohio, February 13, 1898; attended the public schools, the University of Cincinnati, Cincinnati, Ohio, and Cincinnati Law School; during the First World War served in the United States Army as a private; was admitted to the bar in 1919 and commenced the practice of law in Cincinnati, Ohio, the same year; member of the Cincinnati City Council 1922–1926.

=== Congress ===
He was elected as a Republican to the Seventy-first and to the three succeeding Congresses (March 4, 1929 – January 3, 1937); unsuccessful candidate for reelection in 1936 to the Seventy-fifth Congress.

He resumed the practice of law; elected to the Seventy-sixth and to the four succeeding Congresses (January 3, 1939 – January 3, 1949); from early 1940 until the attack on Pearl Harbor, Hess was an interventionist and advocated helping the United Kingdom in the second world war. Hess was an unsuccessful candidate for reelection in 1948 to the Eighty-first Congress; elected to the Eighty-second and to the four succeeding Congresses (January 3, 1951 – January 3, 1961). Hess voted in favor of the Civil Rights Acts of 1957 and 1960.

He was not a candidate for renomination in 1960; resumed the practice of law.

=== Death and burial ===
He was a resident of Cincinnati, Ohio, until his death there on July 14, 1986. His body was interred in Spring Grove Cemetery.

U.S. House of Representatives
| Preceded by Charles Tatgenhorst Jr. | Member of the U.S. House of Representatives from Ohio's 2nd congressional district 1929–1937 | Succeeded by Herbert S. Bigelow |
| Preceded by Herbert S. Bigelow | Member of the U.S. House of Representatives from Ohio's 2nd congressional district 1939–1949 | Succeeded by Earl T. Wagner |
| Preceded by Earl T. Wagner | Member of the U.S. House of Representatives from Ohio's 2nd congressional district 1951–1961 | Succeeded by Donald D. Clancy |
