= Tracie Hunter =

American pastor & former judge in Ohio (born 1967)

- Born: Tracie-Marie Hunter; 1966 (age 59–60); Cincinnati, Ohio, USA
- Education: Miami University; University of Cincinnati (JD)
- Occupation: Church minister
- Known for: Formerly a lawyer and judge; tried in court for a number of felonies
- Political party: Democratic

Tracie Hunter (born Tracie-Marie Hunter; 1966) is an American pastor and former attorney and judge from Cincinnati, Ohio. She serves as minister at the Western Hills Church of the United Brethren in Christ and is best known for her contentious tenure as Hamilton County's juvenile court judge and the lengthy legal proceedings that followed.

Hunter earned a Juris Doctor from the University of Cincinnati College of Law and was admitted to the Ohio bar in 1993. In 2012, following a disputed 2010 election resolved by a federal court recount, she was sworn in as Hamilton County Juvenile Court judge—the first woman and first African American to hold that position. Her judgeship was marked by progressive reforms, including banning the shackling of juveniles in court and pursuing ex-felon voting rights, but also by controversy over media access restrictions and a backlog of undecided cases.

In January 2014, a Hamilton County grand jury indicted Hunter on eight felony counts stemming from allegations of evidence tampering, forgery, theft in office, and nepotism related to her brother's employment at the court's Youth Center. The Ohio Supreme Court immediately disqualified her from the bench. A jury found Hunter guilty of one count — unlawful interest in a public contract — and deadlocked on the remaining charges; she was sentenced to six months in prison, which she ultimately served in 2020 after exhausting years of appeals, during which she was famously dragged from the courtroom by a bailiff for refusing to cooperate with court officers.

Following her release, Hunter pursued reinstatement of her law license. In November 2023, the Ohio Supreme Court upheld an indefinite suspension, though it credited her nine years of interim suspension, making her immediately eligible to apply for reinstatement. A separate civil lawsuit stemming from the case resulted in a jury award later reversed by the Sixth Circuit Court of Appeals in 2024.

== Early life and education ==
Tracie-Marie Hunter was born in Cincinnati, Ohio, in 1966 to Charlotte Thomas and Stephen “Steven” Edward Hunter Sr. She was raised as the eldest of four siblings (Edward Louis, Erica, and Stephen Edward Jr.) in a Catholic family. In 1986, 17-year-old Edward Louis committed a string of armed robberies that ended in a confrontation with the police and Edward Louis shooting himself.

She graduated from Forest Park High School, completed her undergraduate education at Miami University, and earned a Juris Doctor professional degree from the University of Cincinnati College of Law.

== Lawyer ==
Hunter was admitted to the Ohio bar in 1993. She started working as an attorney advocate for neglected children and as a contract attorney with a public defender's office. At the same time, she worked as the general manager of the WCVG urban, gospel, radio station.

== Elected as Juvenile Court judge ==
In 2010, following the retirement of Judge Thomas R. Lipps (R), Hunter submitted her candidacy for the judgeship in Hamilton County's Juvenile Court to fill the position vacated by Lipps. In the primary, the county's Democratic chapter fielded Daniel Donnellon, son of Ed Donnellon, municipal court judge. Hunter won the race with 20,626 to 9,202 votes. She lost the November 2, 2010, election to John Williams, former administrator of the Hamilton County Clerk of Courts and director of the Hamilton County Board of Elections, who had served almost two decades as a prosecutor and magistrate, by nearly three thousand votes.

Hunter's campaign identified what appeared to be significant issues with the provisional ballots that were cast and protested the election results, ultimately leading to the filing of a federal lawsuit. In November 2010, Federal Judge Susan Dlott ruled that Williams should not take the office until the issue of the provisional ballots was investigated and resolved.

On January 10, 2011, upon assuming the office of Ohio Secretary of State, Jon Husted (R), ordered the Board of Election to officially declare John Williams the winner without counting provisional ballots, but after two days, Judge Dlott ordered the Board to count more than 150 of the disputed provisional ballots, which, as stated in the decision, "appeared to have been cast at the wrong precinct table "due to poll worker error".' In April 2011, the Board appealed to the U.S. Supreme Court but the high court declined to hear the case, sending it back to Dlott's District Court for the Southern District of Ohio, Western Division. During the time the court was considering the case, on November 10, 2011, Ohio governor John Kasich (R), appointed Williams to the Juvenile Court, making him senior judge.

On February 8, 2012, some seventeen months after the election, Judge Dlott found for Hunter, while on March 16, 2012, she denied the Hamilton County Board of Elections' motion to stay further proceedings in this action. Following the court-ordered recount, Hunter was declared the winner by 71 votes and was sworn in on May 25, 2012. It was the first time the position of the judge in Hamilton County's Juvenile Court was filled by a woman and an African-American.

== Judgeship ==
During her time as Juvenile Court judge, Hunter mandated that prosecutors turn over evidence to defense lawyers that a state court had already ruled was not disclosable, outlawed the shackling of juveniles in the courtroom, reduced "default judgments," and initiated a change of state election laws that eventually permitted ex-felons to vote. Additionally, she increased the court's staff training, assigned additional drivers for the transportation of offenders in order to reduce crowding in the vehicles, and mandated the provision of additional underwear to juvenile offenders who were previously often forced to share.

In subsequent statements, Hunter claimed that her "focus" was "on rehabilitation instead of incarceration."

Her decision to order the shielding of young convicts' faces from the cameras and to prevent their names from being published in the media was ostensibly based on expert testimony and aimed at reducing the likelihood of recidivism; however, it faced strong objections from Cincinnati media, politicians, and commentators.

=== The "bored beating" case ===
On August 11, 2012, six underage middle school football teammates admitted to the police they attacked and severely injured a passerby unknown to them in North College Hill, giving as the reason for the beating that they were feeling "bored." The case was brought to Judge Hunter's court; she placed the defendants, who had all pleaded guilty, on house arrest pending her decision on the case, and ordered them to do community service in the meantime.

The Cincinnati Enquirer reported the juvenile defendants' names, and Hunter forbade any further presence of the paper's representatives in that case. The Enquirer appealed the decision and won, but Hunter maintained the ban. On April 19, 2013, WCPO Cincinnati also sued Hunter over the restrictions imposed in the coverage of the case for being "unconstitutional." The station won, but again Hunter refused to comply.

The case was not decided until 2014, by which time Hunter was no longer a juvenile court judge. Appeals Court Judge Sylvia Hendon eventually sentenced the defendants, her last judgement made in January 2014, sending one to a juvenile mental health facility and meting probationary sentences to the rest; none went to juvenile prison. (Note: Among the six, were a pair of twins who had been accused the day before of an assault near school grounds. See Kimball (2013-02-17) USA Today) In the meantime, on July 12, 2013, Pat Mahaney, the victim of the attack, had died, approximately one year after the beating, at age 46. (Note: Pat Mahaney, as his brother related, had fallen into a state of "deep depression" after the attack, eventually descending into alcoholism. After performing an autopsy, the Hamilton County Coroner stated that the death was caused by "natural causes," unrelated to the physical traumas from the beating. See Fox19 (2013-08-06))

== Accusations of judicial impropriety ==
In late 2013, county prosecutors voiced suspicions about backdated documents in Hunter's court. On September 13, 2013, Assistant County Prosecutor Bill Breyer reported that someone had backdated documents in Judge Hunter's court and claimed that the private company responsible for the court's computer operation determined that two documents filed and signed by the judge were not created until weeks after they were dated, thus preventing prosecutors from appealing her court's decisions. Two special prosecutors were appointed to investigate the allegations. Hunter was already facing a November 22 deadline set by the First District Court of Appeals to rule on a "backlog of cases" in her court.

On September 17, 2013, County Prosecutor Joe Deters filed a motion requesting special prosecutors for the issues in Hunter's court.

On January 10, 2014, a Hamilton County grand jury indicted Hunter on two counts of tampering with evidence, two counts of forgery, two counts of having an "unlawful interest in a public contract," two counts of theft while in office, and one count of misusing a credit card issued by the court.

The "unlawful interest" charge was about the case of her brother Steven, then employed by the Hamilton County Juvenile Court as a corrections officer at the court's Youth Center, who was accused of "hitting" a person at the center. Some days before Steven Hunter's hearing before the center's Disciplinary Committee, Tracie Hunter allegedly demanded from the center's superintendent "all documentation of every incident and every employee" related to the incident, and, upon receiving these documents, passed them to Steven Hunter, who gave them to his attorney; the latter declined to accept most of the documents, stating that it would be "unethical". (Note: Steve Hunter was eventually fired from the Hamilton County Juvenile Court's Youth Center. See Hamilton County Court of Common Pleas (2022) Opinion 19-3515 19-3550)

During her January 17, 2014 arraignment, she pleaded "not guilty" to all the charges.

== Trials and motions ==
Following her eight-count felony indictment on January 10, 2014, the Ohio Supreme Court disqualified Hunter from serving as a judge the same day. Four days before the trial was set to begin, County Prosecutor Joe Deters publicly blamed Hunter for "causing two deaths" through past decisions in her court. (Note: In August 2013, two juveniles accused of aggravated drug trafficking involving heroin were sentenced by Hunter to out-patient treatment, school, and work, and placed on electronic tagging. The prosecutors had recommended jail time for both. A few weeks after the trial, one of the defendants shot and killed 21 year-old man and was shot dead himself by another. See "timeline" (2014, 2017-07-10) WCPO Cincinnati) During the trial, Steven Hunter, brother of the defendant, testified that his sister gave him documents he used the next day in his disciplinary hearing. The defense claimed that all these documents were part of the public record.

On October 14, 2014, the jury found Hunter guilty on the count of "unlawful interest in a public contract" and deadlocked on all other counts. After reading the verdict, County Judge Norbert Nadel admonished the defendant who, he said, while serving as a judge, engaged in "serious ethical violations" that included, among others, nepotism, improper judicial temperament, tardiness in rendering decisions, and denying public access to her court. A week after the jury verdict, the Ohio Supreme Court suspended her license to practice law. On December 5, 2014, Judge Nadel sentenced Hunter to 6 months in the Justice Center prison, plus one year of community service and monetary compensation for the court's costs.

Several motions against the sentence were submitted by Hunter's lawyers. She remained free, ultimately exhausting her appeals in 2019. At the end of her appeal hearing in court, Hunter refused to cooperate and had to be dragged out of the courtroom by a bailiff. In 2020, Hunter served her sentence after staying 75 days in jail, (Note: Hunter was eligible for a three-for-one credit in her prison time because she ministered to other women while serving her sentence. See WKRC (2020-09-03)) paying $34,000 in court costs, and completing the court-ordered community service.

== Law license suspension appeals ==
On January 31, 2023, Hunter appeared before the Ohio Board of Professional Conduct (Note: The Ohio Board of Professional Conduct is a 28 member quasi-judicial body appointed by the Supreme Court of Ohio that consists of seventeen lawyers, seven active or retired judges, and four non-lawyers. Its authority includes the reinstatement of lawyers suspended from the practice of law.) to support her appeal to have her lawyer's license reinstated. On April 7, 2023, the Board decided to recommend that Hunter be "indefinitely suspended from the practice of law in Ohio". Hunter appealed her case to the Supreme Court of Ohio, and on June 28, 2023, representing herself, she argued to the court that she had not committed the crime of which a jury found her guilty. Asked by Justice Melody J. Stewart what Hunter wanted the court to do, Hunter responded, "I would ask you to dismiss this complaint against me. And make me whole by reinstating my law license."

On November 21, 2023, the Ohio Supreme Court upheld the lower court's decision to indefinitely suspend Hunter's license. The professional conduct rules allow an attorney to seek reinstatement after two years under an indefinite suspension, and the court gave Hunter credit for nine years of suspension time, allowing Hunter the opportunity to immediately apply for reinstatement.

== Personal life ==
In October 1987, while a senior at Miami University, Hunter was involved in a car accident that left her with "serious" head and facial injuries, and both legs temporarily paralyzed. She eventually recovered, and by January 1988, she was back at the university. She took 34 academic credit hours in one semester and graduated on time.

Hunter is a pastor of the Western Hills Brethren in Christ Church.
