= Herman P. Goebel =

American lawyer and politician (1853–1930)

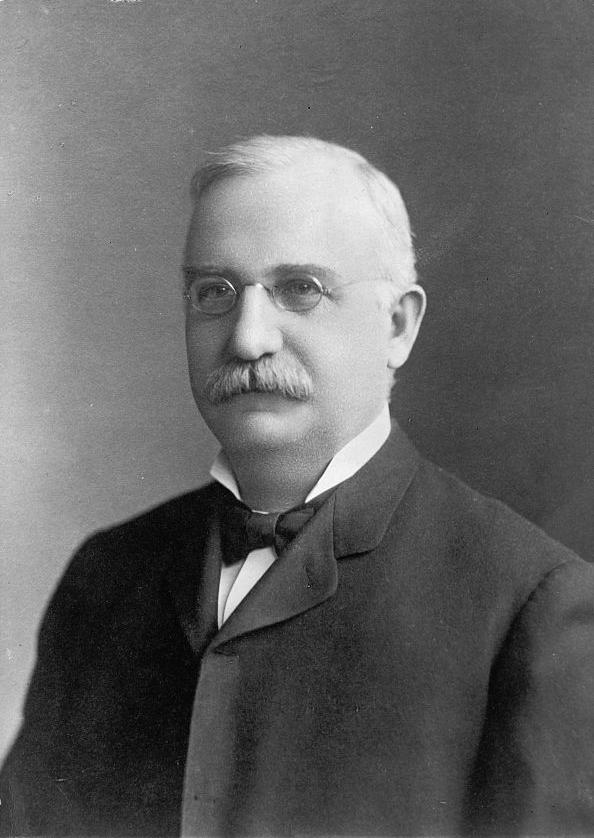

Member of the U.S. House of Representatives from Ohio's 2nd district
- In office March 4, 1903 – March 3, 1911
- Preceded by: Jacob H. Bromwell
- Succeeded by: Alfred G. Allen

Member of the Ohio House of Representatives from the Hamilton County district
- In office January 3, 1876 – January 6, 1878 Serving with nine others
- Preceded by: ten others
- Succeeded by: nine others

Personal details
- Born: Herman Philip Goebel; April 5, 1853 Cincinnati, Ohio
- Died: May 4, 1930 (aged 77) Cincinnati, Ohio
- Resting place: Spring Grove Cemetery
- Party: Republican
- Education: Cincinnati Law School

Herman Philip Goebel (April 5, 1853 – May 4, 1930) was an American lawyer and politician who served four terms as a U.S. representative from Ohio from 1903 to 1911.

== Early life ==
Born in Cincinnati, Ohio, Goebel attended public schools. He was graduated from the Cincinnati Law School in 1872.

== Career ==
He was admitted to the bar in 1874 and commenced practice in Cincinnati. He served as member of the State house of representatives in 1875 and 1876. He served as judge of the probate court of Hamilton County 1884–1890.

=== Congress ===
Goebel was elected as a Republican to the Fifty-eighth and to the three succeeding Congresses (March 4, 1903 – March 4, 1911). He was an unsuccessful candidate for reelection in 1910 to the Sixty-second Congress.

He engaged in the practice of his profession until his death.

== Personal life ==
Goebel died in Cincinnati, on May 4, 1930. He was interred in Spring Grove Cemetery.

U.S. House of Representatives
| Preceded by Jacob H. Bromwell | Member of the U.S. House of Representatives from Ohio's 2nd congressional district 1903–1911 | Succeeded by Alfred G. Allen |
