= Victor Heintz =

American politician (1876–1968)

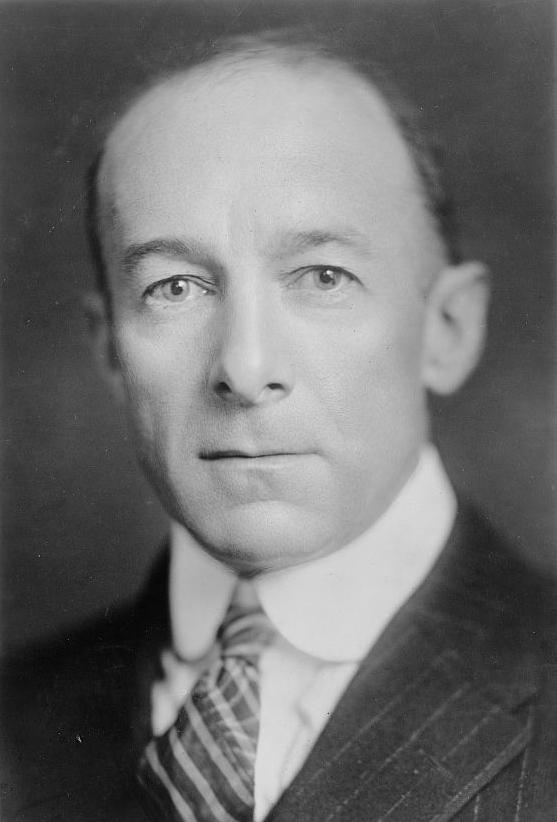
- Heintz, c. 1917

Member of the U.S. House of Representatives from Ohio's 2nd district
- In office March 4, 1917 – March 3, 1919
- Preceded by: Alfred G. Allen
- Succeeded by: Ambrose E. B. Stephens

Personal details
- Born: November 20, 1876 Grayville, Illinois
- Died: December 27, 1968 (aged 92) Cincinnati, Ohio
- Resting place: Armstrong Hill Cemetery, Indian Hill, Ohio
- Party: Republican
- Awards: Distinguished Service Cross; Silver Star; Purple Heart; Croix de Guerre

Military service
- Allegiance: United States
- Branch/service: United States Army
- Rank: Captain
- Unit: Ohio National Guard
- Battles/wars: World War I

Victor Heintz (November 20, 1876 – December 27, 1968) was from 1917 to 1919 a one-term U.S. Representative from Ohio. He was a highly decorated veteran of World War I.

== Early life and career ==
Born on a farm near Grayville, Illinois to German immigrants, Heintz attended the public schools. He graduated from the University of Cincinnati in 1896 and from its law department in 1899. He was admitted to the bar in 1898 and commenced practice in Cincinnati, Ohio. He served six years in the Cavalry and Infantry of the Ohio National Guard.

== Congress ==
Heintz was elected as a Republican to the Sixty-fifth Congress (March 4, 1917 - March 4, 1919). He was not a candidate for renomination in 1918. During the First World War, he absented himself from the House and was commissioned a captain in the One Hundred and Forty-seventh Regiment, United States Infantry, on August 4, 1917.

== World War I ==
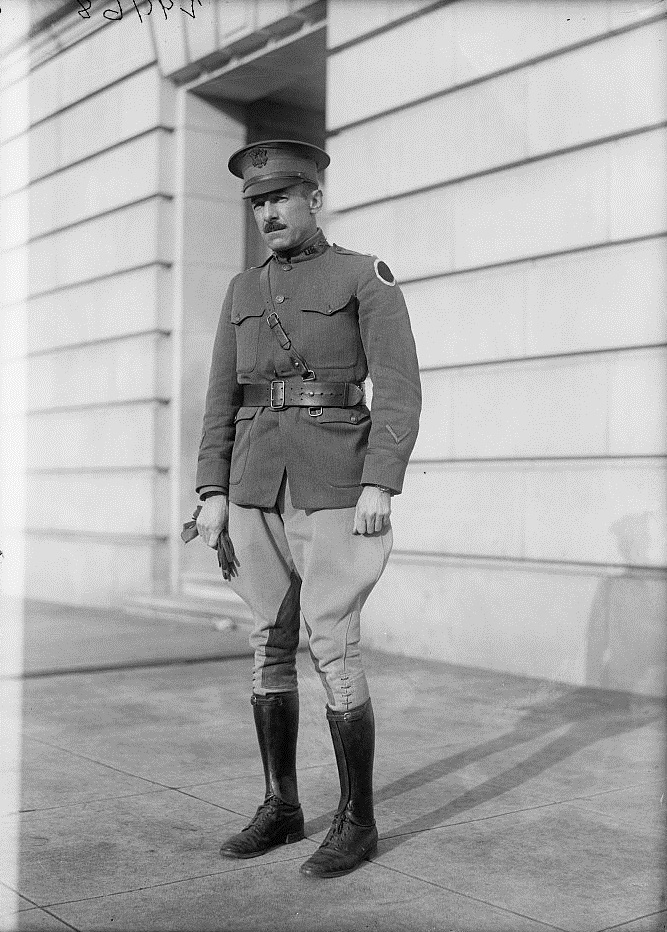
Heintz absented himself from Congress in 1918 to serve in the 147th Infantry, United States Army during World War I.

He went overseas June 22, 1918, and served until the end of the war. Decorated with the Distinguished Service Cross with Oak Leaf Cluster, Silver Star Medal, Purple Heart, and the Croix de Guerre.

== Later career and death ==
He served as vice president and secretary of Ohio Valley Real Estate Co..

He resumed the practice of law until his retirement in 1961.

=== Death ===
He died in Cincinnati, Ohio, December 27, 1968. He was interred in Armstrong Chapel Cemetery, Indian Hill, Ohio.

== Medals ==
- Distinguished Service Cross with Oak Leaf Cluster
- Silver Star
- Croix de guerre
- Purple Heart

== Sources ==
- United States Congress. "Victor Heintz (id: H000455)". Biographical Directory of the United States Congress.

U.S. House of Representatives
Preceded by Alfred G. Allen	Member of the U.S. House of Representatives from Ohio's 2nd congressional district 1917–1919	Succeeded by Ambrose E. B. Stephens
