= Sigma Sigma =

Honorary fraternity at the University of Cincinnati, US

- ΣΣ
- Founded: 1898; 128 years ago University of Cincinnati
- Type: Honor
- Affiliation: Independent
- Status: Active
- Emphasis: Seniors
- Scope: Local
- Colors: Black and Gold
- Publication: Sigma Sigma Members Newsletter
- Chapters: 1
- Members: 800+ lifetime
- Headquarters: c/o Sigma Sigma; University of Cincinnati (1196); PO Box 2187; Columbus, Georgia 31902; United States
- Website: www.sigma-sigma.com

Sigma Sigma (ΣΣ) is a men's upperclassmen honorary fraternity at the University of Cincinnati. Founded in 1898, it is the oldest of such organizations at the University of Cincinnati.

== History ==
Sigma Sigma was founded in the summer of 1898 by Parke Johnson, Russell Wilson, Robert Humphreys, Walter Everhardt, Charles W. Adler, Smith Hickenlooper, Andrew Hickenlooper, and Ada Innes. Created as a sophomore society, by 1902 Sigma Sigma had become known as an upperclassmen male organization. The purpose has remained the same, advancement of the University of Cincinnati, which has been carried out in many ways since the founding.

The constitution of the organization is as follows, "The name of the organization shall be Sigma Sigma. All matters transacted shall be for the good of the order and of the University of Cincinnati. This constitution shall not be amended."

== Symbols ==
The society's colors are black and gold.

== Activities ==
An annual tradition since 1939, each year Sigma Sigma holds a carnival for the student body with booths run by several student organizations. The carnival traditionally brings thousands of people to campus and Sigma Sigma uses the proceeds for various donations back to the university. Since the completion of the Sigma Sigma Commons, the Carnival is annually held in the space. Previously, the carnival was hosted at the Armory Fieldhouse and Nippert Stadium.

Another tradition of the organization is the long-standing award of Mr. Bearcat. The honor recognizes a graduating senior man who has achieved academic success, demonstrated leadership in diverse settings, and contributed to the University of Cincinnati with Bearcat spirit. The award has been given annually by Sigma Sigma since 1949.

== Philanthropy ==
Since its founding, the organization has sponsored several events and philanthropic goals for the university, with the organization's membership donating over $72 million as of 2019.

Leading up to the organization's centennial in 1998, the society contributed to the university through the Sigma Sigma Commons as part of the 1991 master plan of the campus. The society raised over $1.8 million to complete the project, which encapsulates 3.5 acres and includes a granite amphitheater seats for 1,850 people and the 64 ft tall Ronald Walker Tower.

The organization donated the ceremonial mace that is carried in by the university marshal before each commencement ceremony.

== Notable members ==
Following are notable members of Sigma Sigma.

- Chazz Anderson (2010), college football player
- Connor Barwin (2011), NFL player
- Carl Bouldin (1960), MLB player
- David Canary (1958), actor
- Gary Clark (2018), NBA player
- Zach Collaros (2009), CFL player
- Greg Cook (1969), NFL player
- Lewis Johnson (1987), sports commentator and sports reporter
- Smith Hickenlooper (1898), US federal judge
- Jim Holstein (1951), NBA player, head basketball coach at Ball State
- William Keating Sr. (1975), former US Representative, newspaper executive
- Jason Kelce (2009), NFL player
- Sean Kilpatrick (2012), NBA player
- Walter Langsam (1971), former president of the University of Cincinnati
- Jack Laub (1950), NBA player
- Roger McClendon (1987), college basketball player, former chief sustainability officer of Yum! Brands
- Jimmy Nippert (1923), college football player and namesake for Nippert Stadium
- Jim O'Brien (1969), NFL player
- Brig Owens (1964), NFL player
- Alec Pierce (2021), NFL player
- Doug Rosfeld (1999), college football player, NFL coach
- J. K. Schaffer (2010), NFL player
- Josh Schneider (2009), competition swimmer
- George Smith (1933), head basketball coach and athletic director at Cincinnati
- Ralph Staub (1951), former college football player, head football coach at Cincinnati
- Reggie Taylor (1987), CFL player
- Tony Trabert (1951), former amateur World No. 1 tennis champion
- Jack Twyman (1953), NBA player
- Myron Ullman (1967), former chairman and CEO of J. C. Penney, current chairman of Starbucks Corporation
- George Warhop (1983), American football offensive line coach
- Josh Whyle (2022), NFL player
- Russell Wilson (1898), politician and former Mayor of Cincinnati
- Tony Yates (1963), college basketball player, head basketball coach at Cincinnati
- Tyrone Yates (1975), former OH State Representative, judge
- Kari Yli-Renko (1980), CFL player

== External site ==
Official website
