= Charles Tatgenhorst Jr. =

American politician

Member of the U.S. House of Representatives from Ohio's 2nd district
- In office November 8, 1927 – March 3, 1929
- Preceded by: Ambrose E. B. Stephens
- Succeeded by: William E. Hess

Personal details
- Born: August 19, 1883 Cincinnati, Ohio, US
- Died: January 13, 1961 (aged 77) Cincinnati, Ohio, US
- Resting place: Spring Grove Cemetery
- Party: Republican
- Education: Cincinnati Law School

Charles Tatgenhorst Jr. (August 19, 1883 – January 13, 1961) was an American lawyer, jurist, and politician. He was a one-term U.S. Representative from Ohio from 1927 to 1929.

== Early life ==
Tatgenhorst was born in Cincinnati, Ohio on August 19, 1883. He was educated in the public schools of Cincinnati. He was graduated from Cincinnati Law School in 1910.

== Career ==
He was admitted to the bar the same year and commenced practice in Cincinnati. He served as assistant city solicitor for Cincinnati from 1914 to 19. He moved to Cleves, Ohio, in 1919 and continued the practice of law

=== Congress ===
Tatgenhorst was elected as a Republican to the Seventieth Congress to fill the vacancy caused by the death of Ambrose E.B. Stephens and served from November 8, 1927, to March 3, 1929. He was not a candidate for renomination in 1928.

=== Later career ===
He again resumed the practice of his profession in Cincinnati.

Tatgenhorst was elected judge of the Ohio First District Court of Appeals on November 3, 1936. He served until February 8, 1937. He was the Ohio State bar examiner from 1938 to 1942. In January 1941, he became a member of the Ohio State Banking Board. He also served as director of Cincinnati Street Railway Co. and Sullivan Electric Co.

== Personal life ==
Tatgenhorst married Clara Streble. They had one son, Charles Robert Tatgenhorst, who joined his father's practice of law.

== Death and burial ==
Tatgenhorst died in Cincinnati, Ohio on January 13, 1961. He was interred in Spring Grove Cemetery.

U.S. House of Representatives
Preceded by Ambrose E. B. Stephens	Member of the U.S. House of Representatives from Ohio's 2nd congressional district 1927–1929	Succeeded by William E. Hess
