= Bill Gradison =

American politician (born 1928)

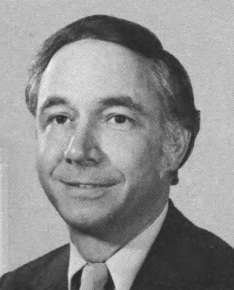

Member of the U.S. House of Representatives from Ohio
- In office January 3, 1975 – January 31, 1993
- Preceded by: Tom Luken
- Succeeded by: Rob Portman
- Constituency: 1st district (1975–1983); 2nd district (1983–1993)

Mayor of Cincinnati
- In office 1971
- Preceded by: Eugene P. Ruehlmann
- Succeeded by: Tom Luken

Personal details
- Born: Willis David Gradison Jr. December 28, 1928 (age 97) Cincinnati, Ohio, U.S.
- Party: Republican
- Education: Yale University (BA); Harvard University (MBA, DBA)

Willis David "Bill" Gradison Jr. (born December 28, 1928) is an American politician from Ohio who served in the United States House of Representatives from 1975 to 1993.

== Early life and education ==
Gradison Republican was born in Cincinnati, Ohio. He received his foundational primary and secondary education directly within his hometown of Cincinnati. During his childhood and school years, Gradison lived in the neighborhood of North Avondale in Cincinnati. His father, Willis Gradison Sr., purchased a historic home in the area and owned it throughout Bill's youth until selling it in 1955. Specifically, the grand, historic home sits at the corner of Rose Hill Avenue and Beechwood Avenue.

Gradison attended the local public elementary school system in the residential neighborhoods of Cincinnati, tracking through the standard primary curriculum during the 1930s. Gradison attended Walnut Hills High School, in Cincinnati, Ohio. He received a Bachelor of Arts degree from Yale University in 1949, a master's degree in business administration from Harvard University's Graduate School of Business Administration in 1951, and a doctor of commercial science degree from the Harvard Business School in 1954.

== Career in banking and politics ==
The foundation of Gradison’s practical economic expertise was Gradison & Co., a Cincinnati investment firm. The brokerage was originally founded in 1925 by his father. The senior Gradison became the youngest-ever president of the Cincinnati Stock Exchange at age 31 in 1930. Bill stepped directly into the family business, working for years as an investment broker and partner at Gradison & Co. In October 1991, the firm was acquired by McDonald & Co. for $22.63 million, later transitioning through KeyCorp and eventually into UBS.

== Career in US Executive Branch (1953-1957) ==
At 24 years old, Gradison was brought to Washington to serve as the Assistant to the Under Secretary of the United States Treasury, Marion B. Folsom. Working directly under Under Secretary Folsom and Treasury Secretary George M. Humphrey, Gradison was immersed in federal debt management, tax analysis, and macroeconomic planning. In August 1955, President Eisenhower appointed Folsom to serve as the second-ever Secretary of the Department of Health, Education, and Welfare (HEW). Folsom brought Gradison along with him to the new department.

== Return to Cincinnati (1957-1974) ==
Upon leaving the Eisenhower administration in 1957, Gradison returned to his family's brokerage. He joined the faculty of the University of Cincinnati, teaching finance as an adjunct professor. He served on the board of trustees for Children’s Hospital of Cincinnati. He took on a leadership role within the Community Chest (now United Way), coordinating fundraising and social services across Cincinnati.

In 1961, Gradison won a seat on the Cincinnati City Council, which he held for 13 years. This tenure included terms as Vice Mayor and ultimately as the 51st Mayor of Cincinnati in 1971. During this era, Cincinnati's governance followed a city-manager system where the mayoralty was selected from among council members rather than via a direct public vote.

Gradison was first elected to the U.S. House of Representatives in 1974, and began serving in 1975 (94th Congress). He was the first Jewish Representative elected to the U.S. Congress from Ohio. He began representing Ohio's 1st district, but after the 1980 census, he and Tom Luken effectively switched districts, with Gradison's district renumbered as the 2nd district. He served until 1993, when he resigned to accept the position of president of the Health Insurance Association of America.

== US House of Representatives Career (1975–1993) ==
During his 18-year career in the U.S. House of Representatives (1975–1993), Gradison served on three standing committees. As a member of the minority party during his entire tenure, his leadership positions were designated as Ranking Member roles. Upon entering Congress in January 1975, Gradison received an initial assignment on the House Post Office and Civil Service Committee.

Gradison was appointed to the House Ways and Means Committee during the 95th Congress (1977) and remained a member until his retirement in 1993. Gradison served as the top Republican on this vital health subcommittee. In this role, he was a principal legislative architect of the Medicare Prospective Payment System (PPS) of 1983 and championed the creation of the federal Medicare Hospice Benefit. He also served as the lead Republican on the Social Security subcommittee. He used this position to coordinate alongside Chairman J.J. "Jake" Pickle to help translate the bipartisan Greenspan Commission recommendations into the Social Security Amendments of 1983.

Gradison was also a member of the House Budget Committee. He rose to become the top Republican on the full House Budget Committee. It was from this leadership perch that he designed, introduced, and successfully shepherded the Federal Credit Reform Act (FCRA) of 1990 into law. Gradison was also appointed to represent Congress on two statutory federal panels. He was Vice Chairman of the U.S. Bipartisan Commission on Comprehensive Health Care (The "Pepper Commission") from 1988 to 1990, and a member of the Joint Committee on Taxation (JCT).

== 1980s tax legislation ==
=== Economic Recovery Tax Act of 1981 ===
In Congress, Gradison was a member of the U.S. House Ways and Means Committee, during the 95th through the 101st U.S. Congress, and was involved in many successful legislative efforts. One effort was the original sponsorship of the bill providing the income tax indexing clause that was later inserted into President Reagan's tax reduction bill of 1981, called The Economic Recovery Tax Act of 1981. This indexing made it so that income tax brackets would automatically be moved up as the inflation rate rose, so that "bracket creep" would be avoided, whereby income tax rates rise only because of inflation, not because of a rise in deflated income levels. It was co-sponsorsed by a majority of members of the U.S. House of Representatives (sponsorship by a majority of members indicates the bill would be passed if put up for a vote on the House floor).

Indexing of taxes became a part of a substitute tax bill, backed by Reagan in a July 27, 1981 evening address to the nation, and known as the Conable-Hance Substitute Tax Bill, H.R. 4260. Instead of the one year tax cut bill sponsored by Ways and Means Chairman Dan Rostenkowski, or the two-year tax cut bill sponsored by the Senate Finance Committee Chair Bob Dole, the substitute bill was a three-year 25 percent tax cut, with federal estate tax relief and the indexing of tax rates to prevent bracket creep beginning in 1985. This substitute bill became The Economic Recovery Tax Act of 1981. It was followed by years of widespread tax elusion efforts, which eventually triggered legislative countermeasures.

=== Social Security Reform Act of 1983 ===
As the ranking Republican on the House Ways and Means Subcommittee on Social Security, U.S. Representative Gradison was an architect in passing the Social Security Amendments of 1983. In the early 1980s, the Old-Age and Survivors Insurance (OASI) Trust Fund was facing a cash shortfall and was projected to run out of money as early as mid-to-late 1983. Working alongside Subcommittee Chairman J.J. "Jake" Pickle (D-TX), Gradison used his fiscal expertise to convert the broad, bipartisan recommendations of the Greenspan Commission into binding, operational law.

Gradison personally authored a provision targeting systemic waste within the program. Prior to 1983, the government routinely lost millions of dollars sending checks to deceased beneficiaries because there was no unified reporting system. Gradison introduced legislation—formally integrated into H.R. 924 (The Social Security Reform Act of 1983)—requiring the federal government to partner with states to automatically cross-reference official state death certificates against beneficiary rolls. This structural change successfully ended the fraudulent continuation of payments to the deceased.

Upgrading Security to Prevent Counterfeiting. Concerned with identity theft and the fraudulent procurement of benefits, Gradison secured a mandate regarding the physical nature of the Social Security card itself. His provisions required all new and replacement cards issued after October 1983 to be printed on counterfeit-resistant banknote paper to protect the integrity of citizen account numbers.

Gradison advocated for the long-term protection of retirement funds from political manipulation. He successfully embedded language into the 1983 reform package that laid the groundwork to place the Social Security Trust Funds "off-budget". This mechanism was designed to isolate retirement funds from the general federal budget, preventing future administrations from using Social Security surpluses to artificially mask or pay down the standard federal deficit.

=== Tax Reform Act of 1984 ===
Gradison broke a decade-long Washington gridlock over the taxation of employer-provided fringe benefits. By authoring a comprehensive framework to permanently codify these benefits, he created a major pillar of the Tax Reform Act of 1984. This structural change expanded the federal tax base, providing the foundation for the Tax Reform Act of 1986.

By the late 1970s, regulatory battle lines had drawn between the Internal Revenue Service (IRS) and the public. Under Section 61 of the tax code, "gross income" technically included all forms of compensation, yet the IRS lacked explicit statutory instructions on how to handle employer-provided perks—such as airline employee passes, free parking, retail discounts, or company cars. The IRS repeatedly attempted to issue regulations to tax these hidden streams of income, b8t Congress refused to let the IRS act. Rather than legislating a permanent solution, Congress repeatedly enacted a temporary statutory moratorium every two years (first in 1978, then extended in 1979 and 1981), legally forbidding the Treasury Department from finalized fringe benefit tax guidelines. This cycle left billions of dollars in non-cash compensation completely untaxed, creating an "underground" form of corporate compensation that shrank the standard income tax base.

As a senior member of the House Ways and Means Committee, Gradison broke the deadlock by introducing legislation alongside Fortney "Pete" Stark (D-CA) designed to circumvent the need for further moratoriums by codifying exactly which fringe benefits were legally tax-free and which were taxable. Gradison’s legislative framework established clear, permanent categories of non-taxable fringe benefits based on real-world expectations:

No-Additional-Cost Services: Perks like standby airline seats for airline employees, which cost the employer nothing extra to provide.

Qualified Employee Discounts: Capped, reasonable retail discounts given to department store employees.

Working Condition Fringes: Perks like a company car used predominantly for business travel, which would have been deductible anyway.

De Minimis Fringes: Minor items too small to reasonably account for, like coffee, holiday turkeys, or occasional typing services. Anything failing to fit into Gradison's explicit legislative categories was legally deemed taxable income at its fair market value.

Gradison's bipartisan bill became the structural blueprint for Title V of the Tax Reform Act of 1984 (enacted as part of the broader Deficit Reduction Act). The permanent codification of fringe benefits broadened the federal tax base. By legally drawing a hard line around what could be hidden as a non-taxable perk, the 1984 Act brought billions of dollars in formerly gray-area corporate compensation firmly into the federal tax net. This became the prerequisite for the Tax Reform Act of 1986.

During the drafting of the Tax Reform Act of 1986, Gradison engineered a critical architectural feature of the bill by using empirical data to prove that eliminating the 10% Investment Tax Credit (ITC) could single-handedly fund a dramatic reduction in the top corporate tax rate. By requesting revenue estimates from the Joint Committee on Taxation (JCT), Gradison shifted the congressional debate away from special-interest tax carrots and toward a low-rate corporate tax system.

In the mid-1980s, the U.S. corporate tax code was bogged down by special deductions, the largest of which was the 10% Investment Tax Credit (ITC). While intended to spur capital investment, the ITC allowed capital-intensive industries to pay little to no federal tax, forcing the statutory top corporate tax rate to remain at 46 percent. Gradison envisioned a "base-broadening, rate-reducing" swap. He submitted a formal request to the staff of the Joint Committee on Taxation (JCT) to calculate a precise mathematical trade-off: If Congress completely eliminated the 10% ITC, exactly how many percentage points could the top corporate tax rate be dropped while remaining entirely revenue-neutral? The JCT’s scoring returns proved that this single base-broadening move generated enough mathematical "breathing room" to lower the top corporate tax rate by roughly 10 to 12 percentage points without adding to the federal deficit. The JCT estimated that repealing the ITC would return tens of billions of dollars over a five-year window.

The JCT data proved that this single base-broadening would decrease the economic incentive towards a bias for short term investment rather than engaging in long term investment, while enabling a large reduction in the corporate tax rate. The Kennedy administration had introduced the ITC tax credit in the Revenue Act of 1962 to encourage investment, but economists came to realize that this actually distorted incentives away from long term investment, with Gradison acting upon this basis. Gradison sent these JCT findings directly to Treasury Secretary Donald Regan, whose department was then building the blueprint for what would become the initial administration tax proposal ("Treasury I"). Regan incorporated the repeal of the ITC directly into the Reagan administration's master plan.

The repeal of the ITC became the baseline assumption for both parties and both chambers of Congress. The Administration Plan included the ITC repeal based on the Gradison-Regan framework, the House Bill maintained the repeal, and the Senate Bill: kept the repeal identical to the House version. Because the Reagan administration plan, the House bill, and the Senate bill were fully identical regarding the ITC repeal, the provision was insulated from traditional political horse-trading. When the bills finally went to the House-Senate conference committee for reconciliation, the item required no debate or compromise. All versions matched, guaranteeing its inclusion in the final compromise package. The Tax Reform Act of 1986 was signed into law with Gradison’s structural backbone intact.

== Budget Committee Work ==
=== Federal Credit Reform Act of 1990 ===
Gradison introduced, sponsored and championed the Federal Credit Reform Act (FCRA) of 1990, a legislative effort sparked by his investigation into the hidden costs of federal loan programs. In the early 1980s, federal agencies utilized the Federal Financing Bank (FFB) as an intermediary to fund direct loans and purchase loan assets. Under the cash-basis accounting rules of the time, these transactions were shielded from regular budgetary scrutiny. The Wall Street Journal addressed this budgeting crisis in an article published on February 23, 1982. This piece—alongside an closely related November 17, 1981 Wall Street Journal article titled "Careening Credit"—was a media catalyst that exposed the exact mechanisms federal agencies were using to bypass congressional spending caps.

Gradison introduced the Truth in Budgeting Act of 1983 (H.R. 2868). During budget hearings in May 1983, Gradison and the Congressional Budget Office (CBO) exposed how the FFB allowed billions of dollars in federal credit assistance to bypass spending limits, masking the true liability to the public.

Gradison collaborated with the CBO and the General Accounting Office (GAO) to craft a framework based on accrual accounting. The goal was to force agencies to calculate the lifetime "subsidy cost" of a loan (including interest subsidies and expected defaults) up front. Gradison introduced modified bills, such as the Federal Credit Reform Act of 1987, building a bipartisan coalition around the principle of fiscal transparency.

Faced with soaring deficits, lawmakers desperately needed tools to accurately measure and cap government liabilities. Gradison’s reform framework was formally integrated as Title XIII of the Omnibus Budget Reconciliation Act of 1990, establishing the Federal Credit Reform Act. Passage via the Omnibus Budget Reconciliation Act of 1990 Gradison’s multi-year campaign succeeded during the fiscal pressures of the 1990 budget summit. Effective in fiscal year 1992, the FCRA forced the unified budget to treat credit extensions on an equal footing with direct grant spending, effectively closing the loophole Gradison had first exposed in his 1983 FFB hearings.

== Health Care ==
=== Medicare Reform ===
By 1982, medical inflation combined with the broader economic recession threatened to bankrupt the Medicare Hospital Insurance Trust Fund by the end of the decade. Gradison became a chief congressional champion of the Prospective Payment System (PPS). Instead of paying bills after the fact, Gradison championed a system where Medicare paid a fixed, predetermined rate per patient based entirely on their specific medical diagnosis. This system classified treatments into Diagnosis-Related Groups (DRGs). If a hospital successfully treated a patient for less than Medicare’s set DRG allotment, the hospital kept the surplus as profit. If the hospital kept the patient too long or ordered redundant, unnecessary tests that ran over the allotment, the hospital had to absorb the financial loss entirely.

Gradison and his colleagues attached the PPS framework directly to theSocial Security Amendments of 1983 (Title VI). Because the Social Security system was facing immediate insolvency, the bill was virtually guaranteed to pass. Serving as a critical bridge between the Reagan administration and House Democrats, Gradison helped the Ways and Means Health Subcommittee finalize and write up the core PPS text in a one-day session on February 24, 1983. Reagan signed it into law less than two months later.

Once the PPS system rolled out nationwide in October 1983, some factions in Congress sought to freeze DRG payments indefinitely to force massive federal savings. Gradison publicly pushed back, warning in policy circles that if Congress continuously starved the prospective payment allocations, the system would artificially restrict the actual quality of care delivered to seniors. He advocated for balanced annual adjustment metrics to keep the payments tethered to real-world medical costs.

=== Hospice Care ===
In 1977, local radiation oncologist Cornelia "Connie" Dettmer and a dedicated group of community volunteers founded the non-profit Hospice of Cincinnati. It was only the fourth hospice program established in the United States. At its inception, the organization relied almost entirely on philanthropic donations and uncompensated volunteer hours. Because traditional insurance and Medicare did not recognize "palliative care"—only curative medical treatments—the facility faced financial instability.

Gradison partnered with Leon Panetta (D-CA) in the House and Bob Dole (R-KS) in the Senate. Together, they introduced the Hospice Care Reimbursement Act. Gradison successfully argued that formalizing hospice benefits would actually save the federal government money. He demonstrated via Congressional Budget Office studies that treating terminally ill patients at home or in dedicated comfort centers was far less expensive than keeping them in standard acute-care hospital beds. Their efforts succeeded when the benefit was formally rolled into the Tax Equity and Fiscal Responsibility Act of 1982 and signed into law by Ronald Reagan. For the first time, Medicare, Medicaid, and private insurers were legally required to reimburse the facility for providing palliative medication, nursing, and bereavement counseling.

=== Pepper Commission on Comprehensive Health Care—universally ===
Gradison served as the Vice Chairman of the U.S. Bipartisan Commission on Comprehensive Health Care—known as the "Pepper Commission"—from its inception in 1988 until it delivered its influential final report in September 1990. Appointed alongside Pete Stark (D-CA) as a Vice Chair, Gradison was the panel’s ranking healthcare technocrat and chief Republican voice. The 15-member commission was created by Congress in late 1988 primarily to address the massive the 31 million uninsured Americans and the costs of elderly long-term care.

Gradison successfully carved out areas of unanimous consensus. He engineered the segment of the final 1990 Pepper Commission report aimed at reforming the private health insurance market for small businesses. Gradison demonstrated that small employers were being priced out of the market due to unfair risk-rating practices by insurance companies. He championed recommendations to outlaw the practice of insurance companies dropping small groups when a single employee got sick, establish guaranteed issue laws so small businesses could always buy affordable baseline coverage, and expand preventive health services under Medicare. The Pepper Commission’s September 1990 Final Report ultimately failed to pass into immediate legislation because of its high price tag and a lack of consensus on a single funding mechanism.

== Cincinnati Cancer Rates and the Mill Creek Acquifer ==
By the late 1970s and early 1980s, epidemiological data revealed that Hamilton County suffered from the second-highest cancer rate in the United States. While the majority of Cincinnati proper safely pulled its municipal drinking water from the surface waters of the Ohio River, several separately incorporated neighboring municipalities—such as Reading, Lockland, and Evendale—drew their drinking water entirely from localized municipal wells tapped into the underlying Mill Creek Aquifer. Because the Mill Creek Valley had been intensely industrialized for decades, Gradison suspected a direct correlation between toxic industrial groundwater contamination and the area's cancer clusters.

Gradison sent a formal inquiry to the Ohio Environmental Protection Agency (Ohio EPA) demanding a chemical analysis of the aquifer's water table. He used his legislative authority to force an investigation into whether unregulated chemical dumping by private industrial entities in the valley was actively poisoning the regional public drinking supply. The testing results returned by the Ohio EPA confirmed Gradison's suspicions: the aquifer was severely contaminated. The state discovered a massive plume of hazardous industrial waste, highlighted by highly concentrated volatile organic compounds (VOCs), trichloroethylene (TCE), industrial solvents, and heavy metals—all known or suspected human carcinogens. These toxic plumes were actively migrating directly into the public municipal well fields utilized by the local municipalities.

Gradison immediately forwarded the Ohio EPA's disclosure letter to the Cincinnati City Council to mobilize a unified regional defense. By the mid-1983 to 1984 window, the U.S. EPA officially stepped in, designating the epicenter of the chemical dumping—the Pristine, Inc. liquid waste disposal facility in Reading—as a top-priority Federal Superfund site. A multi-million-dollar remediation effort ensued, deploying advanced pump-and-treat systems and carbon filtration to strip the carcinogens from the groundwater.

The at-risk, separately incorporated localities permanently abandoned their contaminated aquifer wells andtransitioned their municipal infrastructure to connect with Cincinnati's main water system, drawing safely treated, granular activated carbon-filtered water from the Ohio River. Following this infrastructure shift and the cleanup of the Pristine, Inc. site, Hamilton County’s staggering cancer rates experienced a subsequent, steady decline.

== Positions after Congress ==
The vacancy in the House of Representatives created by Gradison's 1993 resignation was filled by a special election, which was won by fellow Republican Rob Portman. After leaving Capitol Hill, Gradison took the helm of the Health Insurance Association of America (HIAA).

In 2002, Gradison was appointed by the Securities and Exchange Commission as a founding Member of the Public Company Accounting Oversight Board (PCAOB); this Board was created by the Sarbanes-Oxley Act of 2002. Gradison was unanimously reappointed to a full five-year term in August 2004, and served as Acting Chairman from December 2005 to July 2006. He remained a PCAOB Board member until February 2011.

Gradison was named a commissioner of the Medicare Payment Advisory Commission (MedPAC) on May 31, 2011. He was named commissioner of MedPAC, which is an independent Congressional agency established by the Balanced Budget Act of 1997 (P.L. 105-33) to advise the U.S. Congress on issues affecting the Medicare program. He served as a MedPAC commissioner for six years. He was appointed by Gene L. Dodaro, the Comptroller General of the United States and head of the U.S. Government Accountability Office (GAO).

As of 2026, Gradison serves on the Board of Directors for the Committee for a Responsible Federal Budget (CRFB), a nonpartisan, non-profit organization in Washington D.C. dedicated to educating the public and lawmakers on fiscal policy and deficit reduction. Gradison serves on a roughly 40-member board composed of premier bipartisan fiscal experts, including former directors of the Congressional Budget Office (CBO), the Office of Management and Budget (OMB), and former members of Congress.

Gradison returned to a major Washington forum as a featured panelist alongside former OMB Director Leon Panetta, former House Budget Chair John Yarmuth, and former Senator Jeff Sessions. During this presentation, titled Fifty Years of the Congressional Budget Act, Gradison provided a detailed historical look at how the 1974 framework evolved, giving firsthand context on the fiscal battles that ultimately led to his authorship of the Federal Credit Reform Act of 1990.

== See also ==
- List of Jewish members of the United States Congress
- List of United States representatives from Ohio

Political offices
| Preceded by Eugene P. Ruehlmann | Mayor of Cincinnati; 1971 | Succeeded by Tom Luken |
U.S. House of Representatives
| Preceded by Tom Luken | Member of the U.S. House of Representatives from Ohio's 1st congressional district 1975–1983 | Succeeded by Tom Luken |
| Preceded by Tom Luken | Member of the U.S. House of Representatives from Ohio's 2nd congressional district 1983–1993 | Succeeded by Rob Portman |
| Preceded by Bill Frenzel | Ranking Member of the House Budget Committee; 1991–1993 | Succeeded by John Kasich |
U.S. order of precedence (ceremonial)
| Preceded by G. K. Butterfield as Former U.S. Representative | Order of precedence of the United States as Former U.S. Representative | Succeeded by Bill Jefferson as Former U.S. Representative |
