= Pineton de Chambrun family =

French noble family

Pineton de Chambrun
- French noble family
- Country: France
- Origin: Gévaudan

The Pineton de Chambrun family is a French noble family, of which several members have taken an important part in French politics. Their nobility was attested to in 1491. The Pineton de Chambrun originally come from the Gévaudan region, where many members were mayors or deputies of Lozère.

== First family members in French politics ==
- Louis Charles Pineton de Chambrun (1774–1860), émigré of the Army of Condé, colonel of cavalry, deputy of Lozère.
- Joseph Dominique Aldebert de Chambrun (19 November 1821 – 6 February 1899), was a prefect, deputy of Lozère, and senator from 30 January 1876 to 4 January 1879.
- Charles de Chambrun (1827–1880), French politician, member of the Chamber of Deputies.
- Aldebert de Chambrun (1821-1899)

== Family tree ==
Descendants include direct lineage of the Marquis de Lafayette, through the wedding of Marie Henriette Hélène Marthe Tircuy de Corcelle (6 June 1832, Paris – 17 November 1902, Paris), granddaughter of Marie Antoinette Virginie du Motier de La Fayette, at the Église de la Madeleine in Paris, on 8 June 1859, with Charles Adolphe Pineton de Chambrun (10 August 1831, Marjevols – 13 September 1891, New York), a lawyer in New York.

The descendants of Marthe Tircuy de Corcelle and Charles Adolphe Pineton de Chambrun include:

- Marie Thérèse Virginie Françoise de Chambrun (30 June 1860, Essay, Orne – 17 January 1948, Algiers) who married the explorer of Africa Pierre Savorgnan de Brazza.
- Pierre de Chambrun (1865–1954) was elected deputy under the Third Republic (1898–1933) then senator (1933–1941) of the Lozère department. He was part of the Vichy 80 minority group of French elected parliamentarians who, on 10 July 1940, voted against the constitutional change that dissolved the Third Republic and established the state of the Vichy régime under the leadership of Marshal Philippe Pétain. Pierre de Chambrun became a member of the Provisional Consultative Assembly in 1944–1945. He married on 12 December 1895 Margaret Rives Nichols, daughter of George Ward Nichols and Maria Longworth; they had three children:
  - Marthe de Chambrun (1899–1984), who married Alessandro dei Principi Ruspoli-Poggio Suasa (1895–1975); they had one son and two daughters.
  - Jean-Pierre de Chambrun, Marquis de Chambrun (1903–2004), who married Gisèle Hugot-Gratry (1909–2005), heiress of the French monument historique Manor of Ango; they had three sons including:
    - Charles de Chambrun (1930–2010) was an administrator of societies and mayor of Montrodat (Lozère). Gaullist deputy of Lozère from 1962 to 1973, he was named Secretary of State to Foreign Trade in 1966, during the third government of Georges Pompidou. From 1986 to 1988, he was deputy of the Gard department as a member of the National Front.
    - Jean-François de Chambrun (1936–2015), who married firstly Josalee Douglas, niece of US Ambassador to the United Kingdom Lewis Williams Douglas, then secondly Raine, Countess Spencer, the former stepmother of Diana, Princess of Wales.
  - Gilbert de Chambrun, (1909–2009), was a diplomat, mayor of Marjevols from 1953 to 1965, deputy in the Constituent Assembly of 1946, deputy of Lozère from 1946 to 1955 who sieged in the parliamentary group of the French Communist Party (PCF). He married French physician and activist Jacqueline Retourné; they had four children.
- Jacques Aldebert de Chambrun (23 July 1872, Washington, D.C. – 22 April 1962, Paris), Général, high officer of the Legion of Honour (Légion d'honneur), member of the Society of the Cincinnati of France and of the Jockey Club. He married on 19 February 1901, in Cincinnati, Clara Eleanor Longworth (1873–1954), herself sister of Nicholas Longworth who married Alice Roosevelt, daughter of the US President Theodore Roosevelt. Their offspring would include:
  - René de Chambrun (1906–2002), lawyer at the Court of Appeal of Paris and in the Bar of New York, and president of the Baccarat Cristalleries. René de Chambrun married Pierre Laval's daughter Josée, and who later defended, post-war, Laval's memory. He bought the Château de la Grange-Bléneau, a castle in the commune of Courpalay in the Seine-et-Marne département of France, from his cousin, Louis de Lasteyrie, a descendant of La Fayette, in 1935, with a life tenancy. Upon Lasteyrie's death in 1955, René de Chambrun discovered the large cache of documents in the attic, and founded a private museum to Lafayette. He organized and described the family archives, a collection dating from 1457 to 1990. The papers were microfilmed at La Grange in 1995 and 1996, for the United States Library of Congress.
- Charles de Chambrun (1875–1952), diplomat and writer, member of the Académie française; he married Marie de Rohan-Chabot (1876–1951), widow of prince Lucien Murat and daughter of Alain de Rohan-Chabot, Duke of Rohan, and his wife Herminie, Duchess of Rohan (née de La Brousse de Verteillac).
