= De Chambrun =

De Chambrun is a surname. Notable people with the surname include:

- Charles de Chambrun (1875–1952) (1875–1952), French diplomat and writer
- Clara Longworth de Chambrun (1873–1954), American patron of the arts and scholar of Shakespeare
- Comtesse Jean-François de Chambrun or Raine Spencer, Countess Spencer (born 1929), British socialite and local politician
- Pierre de Chambrun (1865–1954), French politician
- Pineton de Chambrun, French aristocratic family, of which several members have taken an important part in French politics
- René de Chambrun (1906–2002), lawyer at the Court of Appeals of Paris and of the New York State Bar Association

== See also ==
- Josée and René de Chambrun Foundation, a non-profit charitable foundation based in Paris, France
