= Adolphe de Chambrun =

French historian, jurist and non-fiction writer

- Born: Charles-Adolphe Pineton de Chambrun; 10 August 1831; Marvejols, Lozère, France
- Died: 13 September 1891 (aged 60); New York City, U.S.
- Education: École Nationale des Chartes
- Occupations: Historian, jurist, writer
- Board member of: Marie Simone Victorine Virginie de Framond de La Framondie
- Spouses: Louis-Charles Pineton de Chambrun; Marie Henriette Hélène Marthe Tircuy de Corcelle
- Children: 4
- Relatives: Francisque de Corcelle (father-in-law); Pierre Savorgnan de Brazza (son-in-law); René de Chambrun (grandson)

Charles-Adolphe Pineton de Chambrun, Marquis of Chambrun (10 August 1831 – 13 September 1891) was a French historian, jurist and non-fiction writer.

== Early life ==
Adolphe de Chambrun was born on 10 August 1831, in Marvejols, Lozère, France. He was the son of Marie Simone Victorine Virginie de Framond de La Framondie (b. c. 1800) and Count Louis-Charles Pineton de Chambrun (1774–1860), émigré of the Army of Condé, colonel of cavalry, deputy of Lozère.

He was a first cousin of Joseph Dominique Aldebert de Chambrun, a prefect, deputy of Lozère, and senator, and Charles de Chambrun, a member of the Chamber of Deputies.

== Career ==
De Chambrun was an historian and a jurist. He served as a legal attache at the Embassy of France, Washington, D.C.

De Chambrun was the author of several books on the United States.

== Personal life and death ==
On 8 June 1859 at the Église de la Madeleine in Paris, de Chambrun married Marie Henriette Hélène Marthe Tircuy de Corcelle, a daughter of Francisque de Corcelle and granddaughter of Marie Antoinette Virginie du Motier de La Fayette (daughter of Gilbert du Motier, Marquis de Lafayette). In New York, they resided on West 23rd Street in Chelsea, Manhattan. Together, they had one daughter and three sons:

- Marie-Thérèse Virginie Françoise Pineton de Chambrun (1860–1948), who married explorer Pierre Savorgnan de Brazza.
- Pierre Pineton de Chambrun (1865–1954), who married Margaret Rives Nichols, daughter of George Ward Nichols and Maria Longworth, in 1895.
- Aldebert Pineton de Chambrun (1872–1962), who married Clara Eleanor Longworth, sister of Nicholas Longworth (who married Alice Roosevelt, daughter of the U.S. President Theodore Roosevelt), in 1901.
- Charles Pineton de Chambrun (1875–1952), who married Marie de Rohan-Chabot, widow of Prince Lucien Murat and daughter of Alain de Rohan-Chabot, Duke of Rohan, and his wife Herminie, Duchess of Rohan (née de La Brousse de Verteillac) in 1934.

De Chambrun died in 1891 in New York City.

== Works ==
- de Chambrun, Adolphe (1853). Quelques réflexions sur l'art dramatique : Mlle. Rachel, ses succès, ses défauts. Paris: Garnier. OCLC 867401250.
- de Chambrun, Adolphe (1857). Du régime parlementaire en France : essai de politique contemporaine. Paris: Didier. OCLC 48306135.
- de Chambrun, Adolphe (1876). Le pouvoir exécutif aux États-Unis : étude de droit constitutionnel. Paris: Ernest Thorin. OCLC 934073764.
- de Chambrun, Adolphe (1891). Les conditions du travail aux États-Unis. Paris: Berger-Levrault et cie. OCLC 41198618.
- de Chambrun, Adolphe (1891). Droits et libertés aux Etats-Unis : leurs origines et leurs progrès. Paris: Ernest Thorin. OCLC 60720915.
