= Claude Tircuy de Corcelle =

French politician (1768–1843)

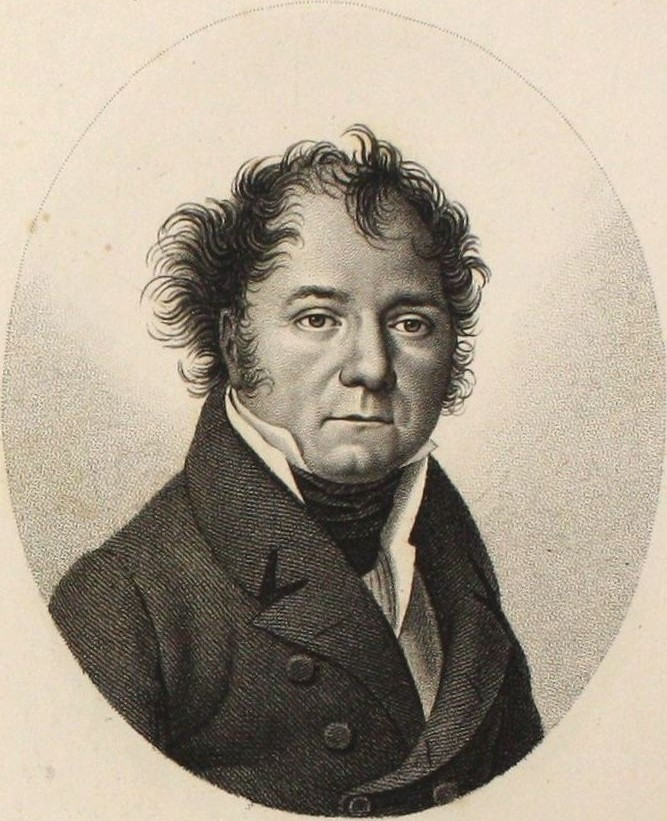
- Born: 1 July 1768; Gleizé, Rhône-et-Loire, France
- Died: 21 July 1843 (aged 75); Paris, France
- Occupation: Politician
- Spouse: Hélène de Rivérieulx de Varax
- Children: Francisque de Corcelle
- Parents: François Joseph Tircuy de Corcelle (father); Geneviève Thérèse Gayot-Mascrany (mother)
- Relatives: Aldebert de Chambrun (great-grandson); Pierre de Chambrun (great-grandson); Charles de Chambrun (great-grandson); René de Chambrun (great-great-grandson)

Claude Tircuy de Corcelle (1 July 1768 – 21 July 1843) was a French politician. He served as a member of the Chamber of Deputies from 1819 to 1822, representing Rhône. He served again from 1828 to 1831, representing Seine, and from 1831 to 1834, representing Saône-et-Loire.
