= Francisque de Corcelle =

French politician

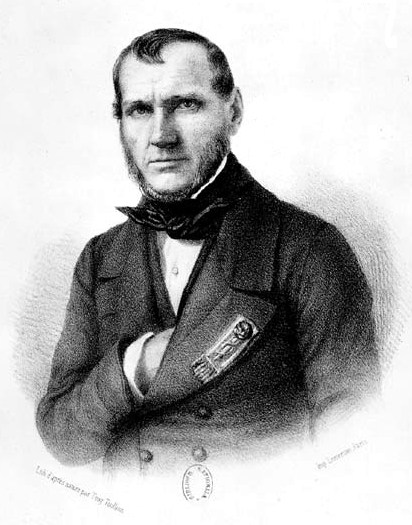
- Francisque de Corcelle in 1848
- Born: Claude, François, Philibert Tircuy de Corcelle; 2 June 1802; Marcilly-d'Azergues, Rhône-et-Loire, France
- Died: 3 September 1892 (aged 90); Paris, France
- Occupation: Politician
- Children: Marie Henriette Hélène Marthe Tircuy de Corcelle
- Parent(s): Claude Tircuy de Corcelle; Hélène de Rivérieulx de Varax
- Relatives: Adolphe de Chambrun (son-in-law); Aldebert de Chambrun (grandson); Pierre de Chambrun (grandson); Charles de Chambrun (grandson); René de Chambrun (great-grandson)

Francisque de Corcelle (1802-1892) was a French politician. He was a grandson -- on his mother's side (Marie Antoinette Virginie Motier De La Fayette) -- of General La Fayette.

== Early life ==
Francisque de Corcelle was born on 2 June 1802 in Francisque de Corcelle, France. His father, Claude Tircuy de Corcelle, was a politician.

== Career ==
De Corcelle served as a member of the National Assembly from 1839 to 1851, representing Gard. Cristina Trivulzio di Belgiojoso, after the fall of the Roman Republic, wrote about him in the Souvenirs: "...at the feet of another of the general's granddaughters, I then saw M. de Corcelles sigh. His gentle and open demeanor, his patriotic and disinterested language won him the consent of the illustrious grandfather. Alas! that he foresaw little of the role to which his little kind would one day consent to descend. With what grief and wrath would M. de La Fayette have been seized, if still alive and retired to his castle, he would have learned that M. de Corcelles, decorated with the title of Extraordinary Envoy of the French Republic, would surrender in 1849 in Gaeta. What a formidable judge would have expected M. de Corcelles on his return, when General de La Fayette, with the authority of an irreproachable conscience and life, questioning him about his conduct, would have said to him:

"What did you do when you entered Rome?" What part have you, Mr. Envoy of France, taken in the imprisonments, in the exile, in the persecution of honest people? the mistreatment of the wounded?

Couldn't his little son have felt the blush rise to his forehead, and what other answer could he have made, if not, by lowering his eyes, to keep silent? Who, good God, can cause a man to betray his name and his covenants like this? to trample on a whole honorable past?" Two decades later, he served again, representing Nord.

De Corcelle was the author of several books about faith and taxes. His correspondence with Alexis de Tocqueville was published posthumously.

== Death ==
De Corcelle died on 3 September 1892 in Paris, France.

== Works ==
- de Corcelle, François (1831). Documents pour servir à l'histoire des conspirations, des parties et des sectes. Paris: Paulin. OCLC 457219774.
- de Corcelle, François (1835). De la suppression de l'impôt du timbre sur les journaux, et de la réduction de leur cautionnement. Paris: Imprimerie de H. Fournier. OCLC 457219757.
- de Corcelle, François (1857). Souvenir de 1848, première intervention dans les affaires de Rome. Paris: C. Douniol. OCLC 457219870.
- de Corcelle, François (1870). Situation financière et politique du Saint-Siège. Marseille: P. Chauffard. OCLC 31796557.
