= Charles de Chambrun =

Charles de Chambrun may refer to:

- Charles de Chambrun (politician, born 1827), French politician of the Pineton de Chambrun family
- Charles de Chambrun (diplomat), French diplomat, writer and member of the Académie française
- Charles de Chambrun (politician, born 1930), French politician of the Pineton de Chambrun family, secretary of state for foreign commerce 1966–67, mayor of Saint-Gilles 1989–1992
