= Josée Laval =

French countess c. 1906 – 1990

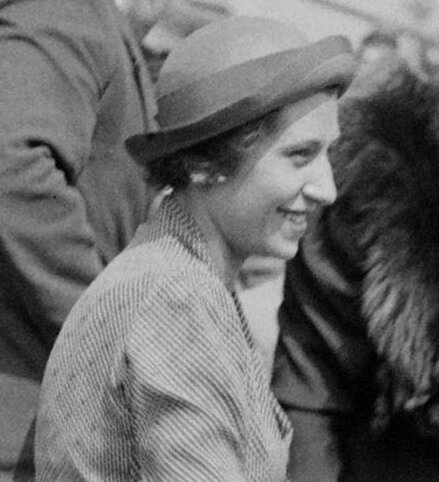
Josée Laval in 1936.

Josée Laval, Countess de Chambrun (born Josette Pierrette Laval; 2 April 1911 – 9 January 1992) was an important figure of the régime de Vichy. She was the daughter of Pierre Laval and the spouse of Count René de Chambrun.

== Biography ==
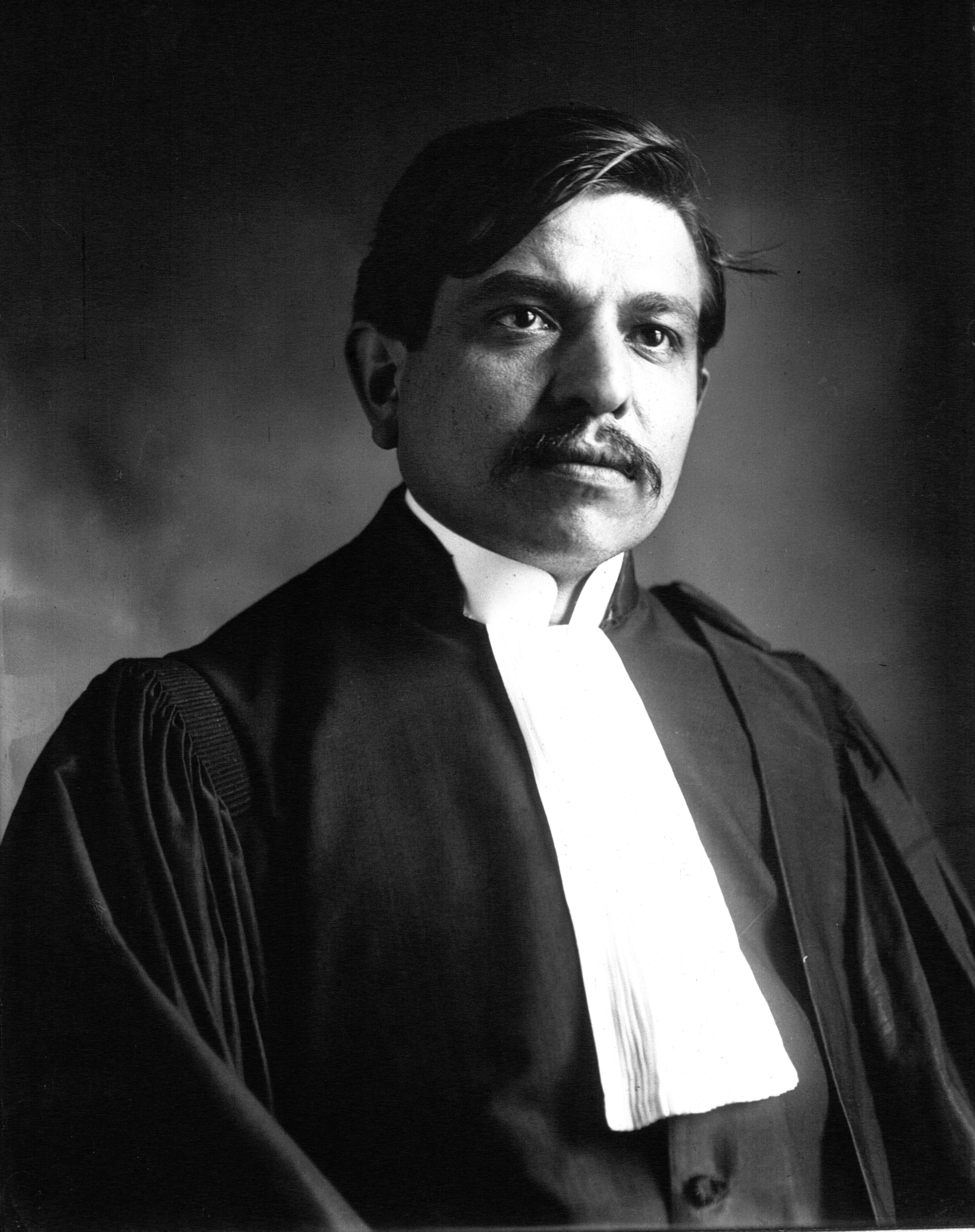
Pierre Laval in 1913, shortly after the birth of Josée Laval

=== Family ===
She was born as Josette Pierrette Laval in Paris, the only daughter of Pierre Laval (1883–1945) and Jeanne Claussat (1888–1959), daughter of the Radical-Socialist mayor of Châteldon (1881–1891) Joseph Claussat (1846–1910) and sister of the député and mayor of Châteldon (1908–1925) Joseph Claussat (1874–1925).

During her childhood, she developed a great admiration towards her father.

=== Marriage and World War II ===
On 19 August 1935 in the basilica Sainte-Clotilde in Paris Josée Laval married Count René de Chambrun, an aristocrat and direct descendant of the American Revolutionary War hero, the Marquis de Lafayette. The groom was the son of Aldebert de Chambrun and Clara Eleanor Longworth, and thus a relative of Franklin and Eleanor Roosevelt. Among the witnesses were General John J. Pershing and Alice Roosevelt Longworth (who was married to Nicholas Longworth, René's maternal uncle).

The newlyweds became friends with such fashionable celebrities as Louise de Vilmorin, Marie-Laure de Noailles, Florence Gould, André Fraigneau, Coco Chanel, Stanislas and Armand de La Rochefoucauld and Henri Sauguet.

During the war, Josée Laval used her father Pierre Laval's important position in the Vichy French government to lead a life of luxury and sophistication, dividing her time between Paris and the family castle of Châteldon, while her husband, as an envoy from the Vichy government, would be able for some time to persuade Franklin Roosevelt that Vichy France would remain friendly to the United States.

Josée maintained a literary salon frequented by collaborationists Xavier Vallat, René Bousquet, Marquis Fernand de Brinon and Otto Abetz.

After the Liberation, they took refuge in the outskirts of Paris and tried vainly to obtain a quick release for her father and clear his reputation; but they could not prevent his execution on 15 October 1945 in the Fresnes Prison. Marked by this ordeal, Josée preferred to forget the war.

=== Last years ===
After liberation, Josée de Chambrun, with the help of her husband, campaigned for the rehabilitation of her father, whose execution she considered to be murder. Every year on 13 December, she would gather her father's former collaborators and maintained close ties with French and German figures involved in the collaboration, including Otto Abetz's wife (she sent parcels to her imprisoned husband), René Bousquet, Paul Morand, Louise de Vilmorin, Marcel Jouhandeau, Jacques Isorni and Abel Bonnard. She gradually resumed her social life.

In 1955, Josée undertook with her husband the renovation of the Château de la Grange-Bléneau, the last residence of the marquis de La Fayette. In the course of the work, the many archives that were unearthed led to the creation of the Fondation Josée-et-René-de-Chambrun, which was recognized as being of public utility on 19 October 1959.

In addition to the conservation of the Château de la Grange-Bléneau and the château de Châteldon, the foundation militates for the rehabilitation of Pierre Laval.

In 2017, the foundation will lend works and souvenirs of La Fayette to the exhibition La Fayette La traversée d'une vie at the Musée Hèbre in Rochefort-sur-Mer (17).

Josée Laval, Countess of Chambrun, died in January 1992, at the age of 80. She is buried in the Montparnasse Cemetery in Paris.

== Posterity ==
A television documentary entitled Les Carnets de Josée Laval is devoted to her in 2018 describes especially her life during the Occupation. The critic from the newspaper Le Monde wrote in this regard: : 'Each time we read [an excerpt from her notebooks], an immense feeling of shame invades us, so much so that the denial of Nazi horrors agitates this past that does not pass'.

Alexandre Jardin (born in 1965), who knew her as a child, also evokes her in Des gens très bien (2011), where Paul Morand also appears.

== Bibliography ==
- Yves Pourcher (2014). Pierre Laval vu par sa fille (in French). Paris: Tallandier. p. 740. ISBN 979-10-210-0709-3.
- Yves Pourcher (2015). Moi, Josée Laval (in French). Paris: Le Cherche midi. p. 256. ISBN 978-2-7491-4440-5.
