= Joseph Claussat =

French politician

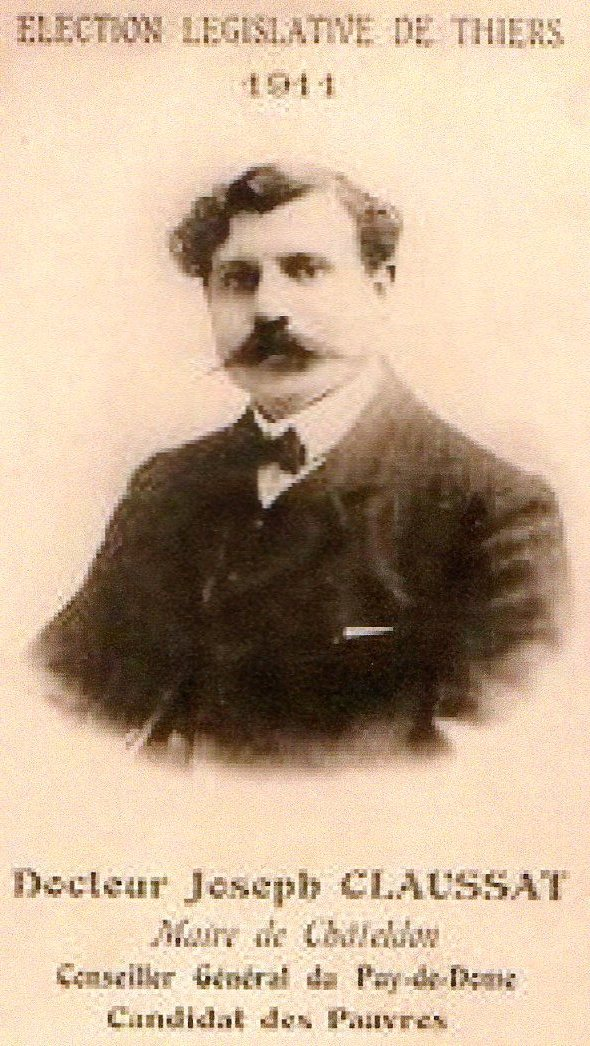
- Born: Pierre Clovis François Joseph Claussat; October 12, 1874; Pont-du-Château, Puy-de-Dôme, France
- Died: November 9, 1925 (aged 51); La Ferté-Vidame, Eure-et-Loir, France
- Occupation: Politician
- Political party: Socialist Party
- Spouse: Marguerite Sacouman (m. 1913)
- Relatives: Pierre Laval (brother-in-law); Josette Bournet (niece); Josée Laval (niece); René de Chambrun (nephew-in-law)

Pierre Clovis François Joseph Claussat (October 12, 1874 – November 9, 1925) was a French politician. He served as the mayor of Châteldon from 1908 until his death in 1925. He also served as a member of the Chamber of Deputies from 1911 to 1925, representing Puy-de-Dôme.

He was born to Joseph Claussat (1846-1910) and Élisabeth Dassaud. He had seven siblings three of whom were: Jean (1872-1916), an infantry commander who died of wounds in Verdun during World War I, Marie "Marguerite" (the mother of painter Josette Bournet) and Élisabeth Eugénie Marie Marguerite Jeanne "Jeanne" (1888-1959) (the wife of politician Pierre Laval and mother of Josée Laval). His father, also a Socialist, had served as mayor of Châteldon from 1881 to 1891.

He married (Jeanne) Marguerite Sacouman (1883-1925) on August 14, 1913. They didn't have children. He died suddenly of a cerebral hemorrhage while on a hunting trip on November 9, 1925, at La Ferté-Vidame near Chartres, at the age of 51. His wife committed suicide three days later.
