= Gilbert de Chambrun =

French politician

- Born: 2 November 1909; Paris, France
- Died: 22 December 2009 (aged 100); Marvejols, Lozère, France
- Education: Lycée Janson de Sailly
- Alma mater: University of Paris; Sciences Po
- Occupation: Politician
- Spouse: Jacqueline de Chambrun
- Children: 4
- Parent: Pierre de Chambrun
- Relatives: Charles de Chambrun (paternal uncle); René de Chambrun (cousin)

Count Gilbert de Chambrun (1909–2009) was a French politician. He was a member of the French Resistance and he served in the National Assembly.

== Early life ==
Gilbert de Chambrun was born on 2 November 1909 in Paris, France. His father, Pierre de Chambrun, was a politician. He was a descendant of Agrippa d'Aubigné and Gilbert du Motier, Marquis de Lafayette, and he was raised as a Calvinist.

De Chambrun was educated at the Lycée Janson de Sailly. He graduated with a bachelor's degree in Laws from the University of Paris, and he received another degree from Sciences Po.

== Career ==
Chambrun joined the French Foreign Service in 1934, serving at the French embassy in Rome until 1938. During World War II, he served in the French Army from 1939 to 1941. He joined Combat, a group within the French resistance in 1942, and he served as a leader until 1944. At the end of the war, he returned to the French Army, where he served under General Jean de Lattre de Tassigny.

De Chambrun served as a member of the National Assembly from 1945 to 1955, representing Lozère. He was opposed to the First Indochina War as well as the establishment of the European Coal and Steel Community, the European Defence Community, and NATO. He was the vice president of the Mouvement pour la paix, a non-profit organization which promoted nuclear disarmament.

De Chambrun resumed his position in the Foreign Service in 1956. Meanwhile, he also served as the mayor of Marvejols from 1953 to 1965, and again from 1971 to 1983. He was a Commander of the Legion of Honour and the National Order of Merit. He was a recipient of the Croix de guerre and the Resistance Medal for his World War II service.

De Chambrun published his memoir as well as a novel and several plays.

== Personal life and death ==
De Chambrun married Jacqueline Retourné, a paediatrician whom he met in the Maquis du Mont Mouchet. They had four children. He died on 22 December 2009 in Marvejols, Lozère, France. He was 100 years old.

== Works ==
- de Chambrun, Gilbert (1982). Journal d'un militaire d'occasion. Avignon: Editions Aubanel. ISBN 9782700600988. OCLC 10184752.
- de Chambrun, Gilbert (1991). Le retour de la bête. Etrépilly: Editions Bartillat. ISBN 9782905563453. OCLC 28068929.
