= Charles de Chambrun (politician, born 1930) =

French politician

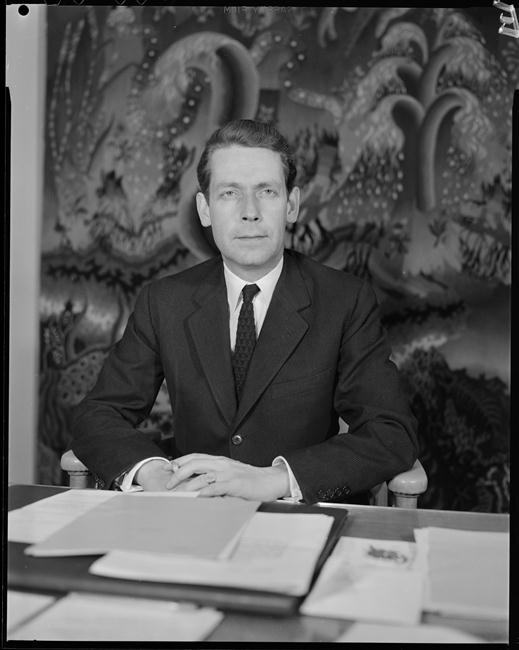

Secretary of State to External trade
- In office 1966–1967
- President: Charles de Gaulle
- Prime Minister: Georges Pompidou

Personal details
- Born: 16 June 1930 Paris, France
- Died: 21 October 2010 (aged 80) Carthage, Tunisia
- Party: RPR; National Front
- Relatives: Pierre de Chambrun (paternal grandfather); Gilbert de Chambrun (uncle); Charles de Chambrun (paternal great-uncle)

Charles de Chambrun (1930–2010) was a French politician.

== Early life ==
Charles de Chambrun was born on June 16, 1930, in Paris, France. His grandfather Pierre de Chambrun and uncle, Gilbert de Chambrun, were politicians. He was a direct descendant of Gilbert du Motier, Marquis de Lafayette.

== Career ==
De Chambrun served as Secretary of Foreign Trade from February 1966 to March 1967 under Prime Minister Georges Pompidou and President Charles de Gaulle. He served as a member of the National Assembly from 1968 to 1972, representing Lozère. After joining the National Front, he served again from 1986 to 1988, representing Gard. He was elected as the mayor of Saint-Gilles in 1992.

== Death ==
De Chambrun died on October 21, 2010, in Tunis, Tunisia at the age of 80.
