= Nick De Morgoli =

French photojournalist

- Born: Nick De Morgoli; 19 October 1916; France
- Died: 8 September 2000 (aged 83)
- Occupation: Magazine photojournalist

Nick De Morgoli (19 October 1916 – 8 September 2000) was a French photojournalist who worked for major magazines and picture agencies, active 1930s-1960s.

== Biographical note ==
Nick De Morgoli was a French citizen before being enfranchised to the US in 1959, but there is scant record of his origins. His early use of 'Nikita' as his first name gives credibility to Stephane Groueff’s impression, when they worked together at the New York office of Paris Match, that he was a Russian émigré He married Monique Vallis in 1944, a journalist whose writing appears in Album du Figaro, n°46, March–April 1954.

== Career ==
De Morgoli's pictures started to appear in French publications in the 1930s. An early series, photographed in Pablo Picasso’s studio, dates from 1947. The artist reappears in a 1947 photograph by De Morgoli in a muscular pose in front of his canvases displayed between copies of two Michelangelo Slaves. It was in that year that the photographer arrived in the United States, after his coverage of the 1947 trial in Bordeaux of Magda Fontanges for collaboration and treason, appeared in LIFE magazine, though he himself had been convicted on May 7, 1946 of having participated in pro-Vichy propaganda.

The film industry in which he apparently had worked, benefitted from Vichy rule. Production continued during the Occupation, especially with the German ban on British and American films, and attendances increased as crowds sought the warmth of cinemas. In particular the company Continental, created in September 1940 by the Nazi Propaganda Minister Joseph Goebbels to help suppress French nationalism, benefitted from finance and management by the Germans. Under the direction of former soldier and staunch Nazi Alfred Greven, the company Continental produced thirty films between 1941 and 1944.

De Margoli’s penalties were light compared to the executions of some intellectuals during this post-war period of ‘épuration’; his sentence for ‘participation in propaganda films’ was a form of public humiliation, namely ‘dismissal without compensation; insertion of notices of the sentence at his expense in Le Film français and Entr'aide du cinéma: Bulletin trimestriel sur les activités sociales du cinéma destiné à renseigner les membres de la corporation, and registration as an offender with the Prefecture of Police.

Nevertheless, and as an indication that his offences were minor, or quickly forgotten, that year his unusual back view of Charles De Gaulle on the edge of the sea at Antibes when recently resigned as Provisional President of France, was published in LIFE with the caption “Elegantly dressed Charles de Gaulle, who recently resigned as Provisional President of France, moodily staring out over the Mediterranean as he begins a 12-yr. withdrawal from political life.”

== Paris Match ==
His work for Paris Match, mostly human interest stories and portraits of celebrities, many now in the Bibliothèque nationale de France included Léon Blum at his desk during a television recording; Paul Claudel at home with his grandchildren and praying in a church; Maurice Estève; Felix Gouin in a room of the Luxembourg Palace (April 29, 1946); Marcel Pagnol alone fishing and with his wife Jacqueline Bouvier; Jacques Thibaud with his family; Jacques Villon; Mr. and Mrs. Mackenzie King; Michèle Morgan and Mario Moreno, Vincent Scotto, Pierre Laroche, and Georges Huysman during the first festival of Cannes (1946); and on 18 November 1946 he produced a story on Vaslav Nijinsky, then long retired and hampered by his schizophrenia, in the tender care of his wife.

He also produced ‘glamour pictures’ and pictures of models who include Lise Bourdin whom he photographed for Claudine and who went into French cinema, and several who became Hollywood actors including Corine Calvet and Denise (Billecard) ‘Darcel’. He also photographed Marilyn Monroe in 1952 and 1953 in a pin-up style.

== In America ==
In 1948 De Margoli had moved to the United States of America in 1948, first working as a circus photographer but was later that year elected into the American Society of Magazine Photographers (ASMP) in the same year as Eisenstaedt and Robert Frank, and during the year of ASMP's first exhibition Oct 15-31 1948 at the Pepsi-Cola Center He was joined by his wife Monique in December 1959.

From 1951 he worked at the recently inaugurated Paris-Match New York bureau on Second Avenue. For the magazine his stories included one in 1953 on author Georges Simenon who had also faced a five-year ‘éperation’ for Nazi collaboration and who had fled to America. His subjects also included US President Harry Truman with Secretary of State Dean Acheson & Secretary of Defence General George Marshall during a meeting with French Premier René Pleven; studio portraits of Patricia Roc, British film actress; and Adlai E. Stevenson during his presidential election campaign (1952 or 1956). When Edith Piaf wed Jacques Pills, he pictured Marlene Dietrich kneeling at her feet to put new holes in the straps of the bride's shoes.

De Morgoli's candid shot, made at table level between candlesticks, of an unidentified young woman at an exclusive restaurant was selected by curator Edward Steichen for the 1955 world-touring Museum of Modern Art exhibition The Family of Man.

== Vogue ==
His work entailed frequent trips across the Atlantic for such assignments as portraying Olivia de Havilland at home in Paris for Votre Beauté, October 1955. For Vogue he photographed Italian actress Pier Agnelli wearing an evening gown at the Franco-American ball at Waldorf Astoria in New York City, July 1, 1954; Marie-Rose Lebigot in a subtle 1955 shoot modelling a designer girdle; Vicomtesse Bouquet des Chaux in a Balenciaga dress at the Bal Maxwell in France (1955); and Mrs. Cleveland Amory chatting with Clyde Roche, Jean Harvey, and Jeffrey Roche, with Charles Wacker with Alfred Gwynne Vanderbilt in background, at the debut party for Lucille Vanderbilt (1956).

Through 1957, also for Vogue, he produced picture stories on John Mason Brown, writer, lecturer, and word critic on Sunday TV; Mr. and Mrs. Douglas Fairbanks with Col. Serge Obolensky and Henrietta Tiarks at a debut in the St. Regis Hotel. In 1959; Leonard Bernstein, conductor and composer, and his wife; and Marlene Dietrich and daughter Maria Riva in a busy production scene on set of CBS-TV Studio I show, a rare shot of them together.

His imagery for Vogue’s Travel supplement required him to make longer trips in 1957: a plantation In Kauai in Hawaiian archipelago; a Shinto priest praying at a shrine in Tokyo, Japan; a donkey walking through coconut harvest beside main highway in the Philippines; and ruins above a harbour in Macau, China. Stephane Groueff, then bureau manager Paris Match New York, remembered De Morgoli as;

“a charming companion, with a pronounced penchant for comfort and civilised living. A well-groomed man in his late 30s, with worldly manners and discriminating taste, he refused to settle for second-rate hotels, fast food, or cheap wines when on assignment, which would've been fine, except for one annoying problem: Nick was permanently broke…"I cannot be distracted when I work. To be creative, I need my comfort." And creative he was indeed, always coming up with some imaginative idea for a photo. He was a good professional, and pleasant to work and travel with.”

On return from one overseas tour, in 1959, De Morgolis was naturalised as a US citizen. Amongst several visual artists he photographed were Raoul Dufy, French painter during his stay in the US for arthritis treatment at the Jewish Memorial Hospital, 1950; Salvador Dalí fixing his famous moustache in a shaving mirror (c.1955); and Alexander Calder and his 'stabiles' in 1960.

== Collections ==
- Getty Images: given the celebrity status of many of his subjects such as Edith Piaf, Marlene Dietrich and her daughter Maria Riva, and Marilyn Monroe, works by the artist still sell strongly at auction, and many are sold online via Getty Images and other agencies.
- Bibliothèque nationale de France
- Claire Mccardell Photograph Collection ca. 1923–1995, PP238, Special Collections Department, Maryland Historical Society
- Harry S. Truman Library & Museum
- Henry Cabot Lodge, Jr. Photographs II, Massachusetts Historical Society.

== Exhibitions ==
- Represented in The Family of Man touring exhibition and publication, 1955.
- Represented in I want to be loved by you Opera Gallery, 356 rue Saint-Honoré, 75001 Paris, May 25 – June 17, 2012
- Represented in Des Villes et des Hommes: Regard sur la collection Florence et Damien Bachelot Hôtel Départemental des Arts – Centre d’art du Var February 10 – April 22, 2018.
