= Magda Fontanges =

- Fontanges photographed by Nick De Morgoli for Time magazine on 17 February 1947
- Born: 10 May 1905; La Roche-sur-Yon, Pays de la Loire, France
- Died: 1 October 1960 (aged 55); Geneva, Switzerland

Magda Fontanges (10 May 1905 – 1 October 1960), also known as Madeleine Coraboeuf, was a French actress, journalist and a spy for the Germany Secret Service between 1940 and 1943.

== Biography ==
=== Early life ===
Born in 1905, the daughter of the painter Jean Coraboeuf in Pouille-les-Coteaux, Fontanges lost her mother at age seven. By the age of 19 she was married, only to divorce two years later. Another source suggests that it was at 17 years of age, just after leaving school, that Fontanges married a police official. After the separation, she moved to Paris and took the surname Fontanges, the name of a former Louis XIV mistress.

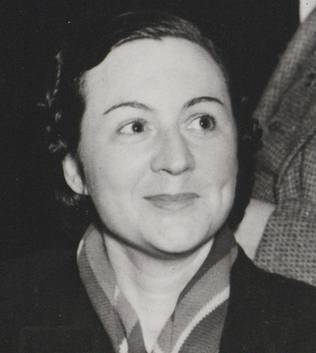
Magda Fontanges, 1937

By 1926 she became a known figure in Parisian society, frequenting political and diplomatic circles. She was considered by the press "a beautiful French actress". In 1935, she became a journalist. As a news correspondent in Rome during 1936, she met and befriended Benito Mussolini.

In 1937 Fontanges was found guilty of shooting Count Charles de Chambrun, then the French Ambassador to Rome, at the Gare du Nord on March 17. Reports explain that M. de Chambrun was wounded as he alighted a train in a revenge attack; Fontanges accused him of ruining her "love affair" with Mussolini. She told the magistrate at the trial:

Fontanges accused the Comte De Chambrun of compromising her situation by revealing the details of her love affair with Mussolini to the then-secretary of the French Embassy in Rome, M. Garnier.

She was fined 100 Francs (1 Great British Pound), and given a suspended sentence due to having no previous criminal record. Whilst on probation, only a few weeks after the trial, Fontanges was arrested by French police whilst attempting to escape to Spain via St Jean de Luz on account of passport irregularities.

=== World War II ===
Helena, Agent 8608

She was known as "Helena Agent 8608" and was reported to have agreed to be an informant for Germany from the beginning of the occupation, an act which is credited to have facilitated an extensive espionage network.

In 1947 Fontanges, at 37 years of age, she was brought to face a military tribunal in Bordeaux on a charge of "intelligence with the enemy" or betraying the French Underground to the Nazis. She was alleged to have been paid a total of $USD42 per month, plus expenses for this work. During the trial she claimed to have sought protection from the Germans in 1940 to escape alleged "persecution" by the French. She was accused of making several missions in France and Belgium and was abruptly discharged when she refused a mission to Italy where she was to investigate suspected growing sympathies between Mussolini, Ciano and the Allies.

She was sentenced to 15 years' hard labour and confiscation of her property on charges of intelligence with the enemy, sentenced to "national indignity" for life, as well as being exiled her from Paris and any other "large French town" for 20 years. Fontanges was quoted as saying upon the conclusion of the trial:

My only regret is that I wasn't hanged with the Duce instead of his last mistress, Clara Petacci.

=== Later life ===
Fontanges was then imprisoned in the women's prison in Mauzac from 1948 to 1952. For health reasons, in 1952 she is released to house arrest in Melun, however Fontanges moved to Paris with the intention of managing a bar, and was arrested again for not respecting the terms of her parole. She was then placed in La Roquette Prisons. Freed in 1955, Fontanges was later that year accused of stealing a valuable Maurice Utrillo painting from her lawyer and suspected lover.

In 1960, Fontanges was found dead in her Geneva apartment from a suspected sleeping pill overdose.
