= Jacqueline de Chambrun =

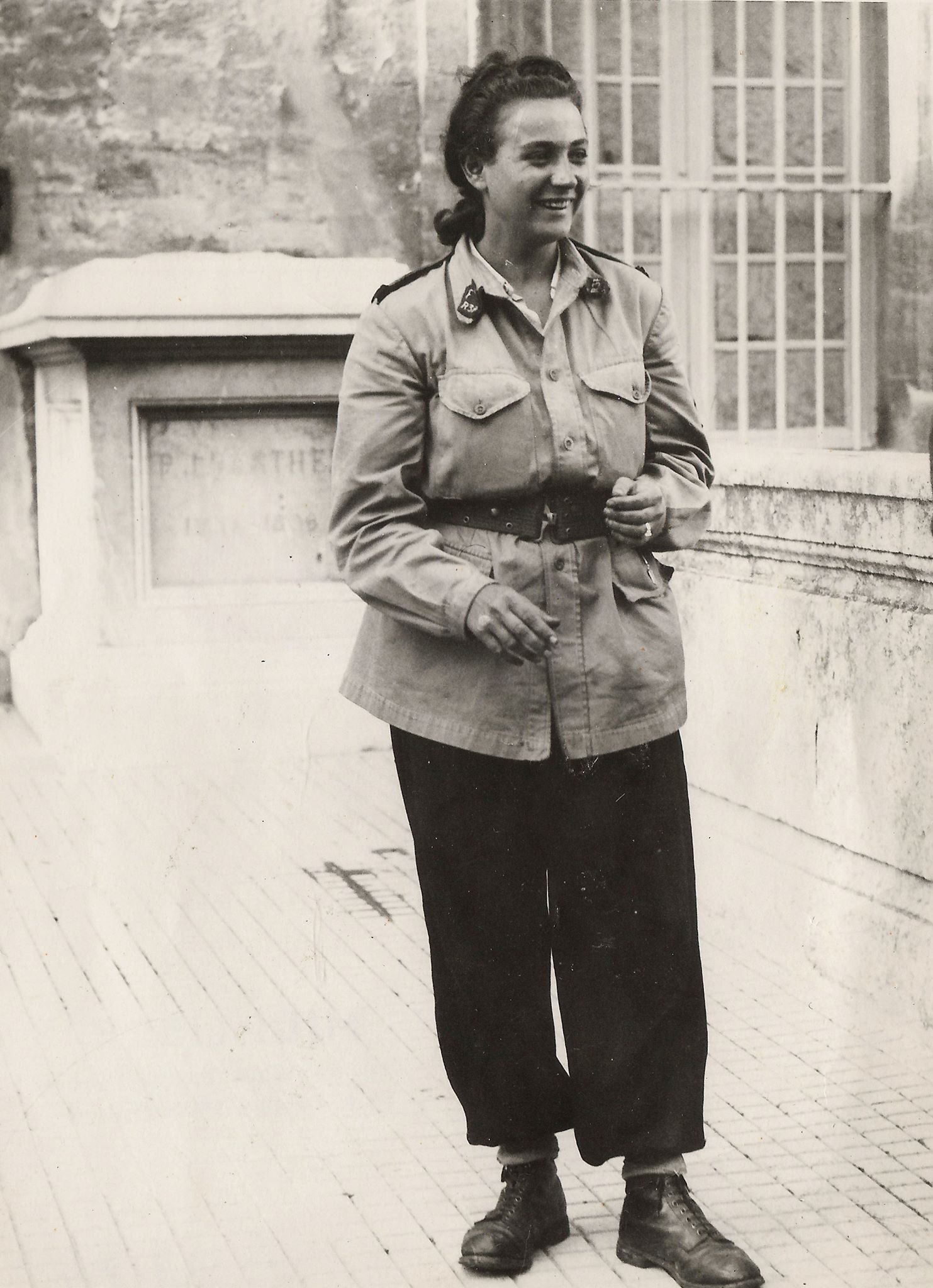
- Born: Jacqueline Retourné; 20 December 1920; Casablanca, Morocco
- Died: 24 September 2013 (aged 92); Marvejols, Lozère, France
- Education: University of Montpellier
- Occupation: Activist
- Spouse: Gilbert de Chambrun
- Children: 4
- Parent(s): Henri Retourné; Marthe Retourné

Countess Jacqueline de Chambrun (1920-2013) was a French physician and activist. She was a member of the French Resistance during World War II. She campaigned for abortion rights as well as human rights for the homeless and undocumented immigrants in France.

== Early life ==
Jacqueline de Chambrun was born as Jacqueline Retourné in 1920 in Casablanca, Morocco. Her father, Henri Retourné, was a veteran of World War I. Her mother was a dressmaker.

De Chambrun graduated from the University of Montpellier, where she studied medicine.

== Career ==
De Chambrun was a paediatrician.

In 1942, in the midst of World War II, de Chambrun joined Combat, a group within the French Resistance. She escaped from the Gestapo in Montpellier in July 1943, and she served in Combat in Paris, Marseille and Lyon. She escaped from the Gestapo once again in January 1944, this time in Lyon. Taking the pseudonym of Lieutenant Noëlle, she joined the Maquis du Mont Mouchet, serving until June 1944. She subsequently joined another maquis which focused on sabotaging trains.

De Chambrun was a member of the Commission nationale consultative des droits de l'homme, where she championed the human rights of the homeless and undocumented immigrants. She campaigned for abortion rights in France. She also volunteered for Planned Parenthood and served on the board of trustees of the Secours populaire français.

De Chambrun was the subject of a 2008 documentary, Sans jamais renoncer, directed by her grandson, Axel Ramonet de Chambrun. She was a Commander of the Legion of Honour.

== Personal life and death ==
De Chambrun married Gilbert de Chambrun. They had four children. She died on 24 September 2013 in Marvejols, France. She was 92 years old. Her funeral was held at the église Notre-Dame de la Carce in Marvejols.
