= Châteldon =

- Commune
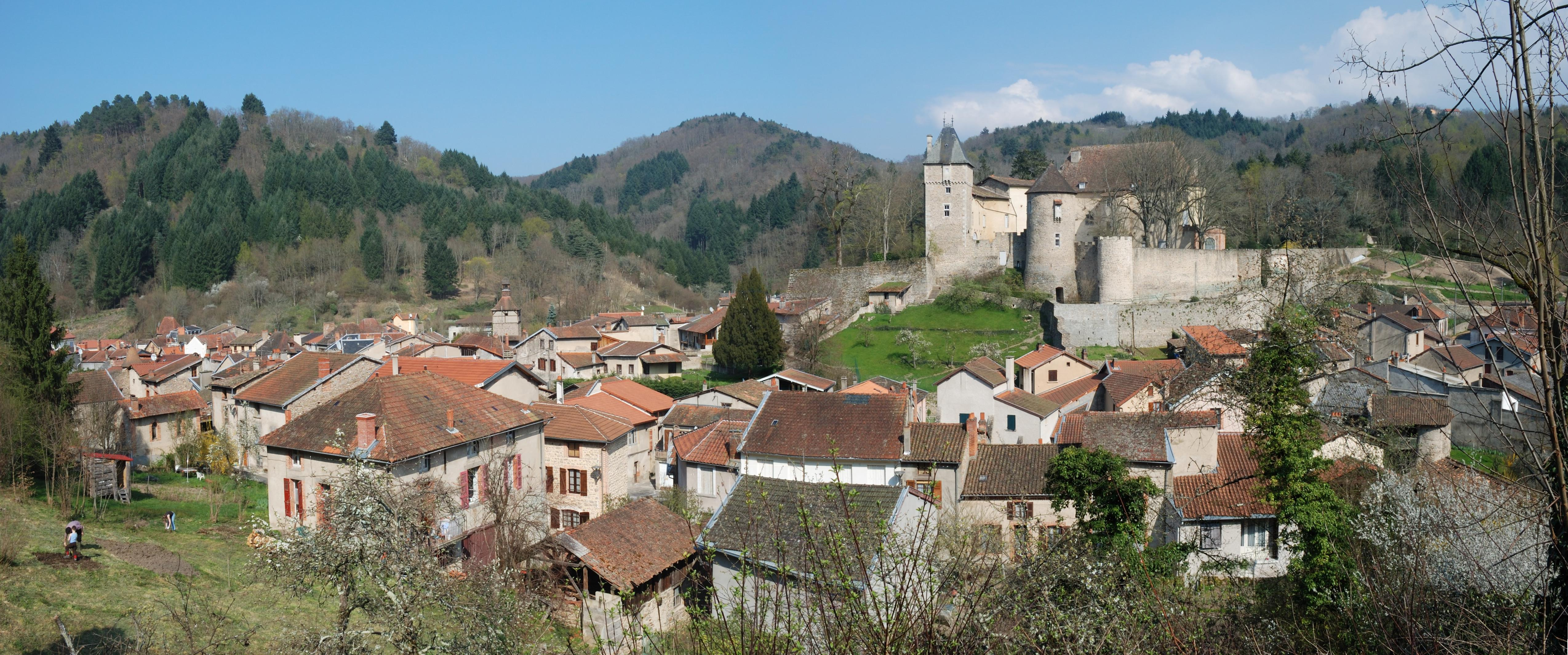
- A general view of Châteldon

- Coat of arms
- Location of Châteldon
- Location within France Location within Auvergne-Rhône-Alpes
- Coordinates: 45°58′39″N 3°31′16″E
- Country: France
- Region: Auvergne-Rhône-Alpes
- Department: Puy-de-Dôme
- Arrondissement: Thiers
- Canton: Maringues

Government
  - Mayor (2026–32): Tony Bernard
- Area^{1}: 28.43 km^{2} (10.98 sq mi)
- Elevation: 300 m (980 ft)
- Highest elevation: 862 m (2,828 ft)
- Lowest elevation: 285 m (935 ft)
- Population (2023): 740
  - Density: 26/km^{2} (67/sq mi)
- Time zone: UTC+01:00 (CET)
  - Summer (DST): UTC+02:00 (CEST)
- INSEE/Postal code: 63102 /63290
- Website: chateldon.com
- ^{1} French Land Register data, which excludes lakes, ponds, glaciers > 1 km^{2} (0.386 sq mi or 247 acres) and river estuaries.

Châteldon (French pronunciation: [ʃatɛldɔ̃]; Occitan: Chasteladon) is a commune in the Puy-de-Dôme department in Auvergne-Rhône-Alpes in central France.

== About the town ==
Châteldon is a medieval village in the northern part of Auvergne. It dates from the early Middle Ages, with many of its buildings dating back to the 14th century. The town's fortifications are still in evidence.

The village lies on the western edge of the Montagne Bourbonnaise and the northern edge of the Livradois-Forez Regional Natural Park, the largest nature park in Europe. To the west lies the Limagne, where the Allier and Dore rivers converge. Nineteen kilometres to the north is the City of Vichy.

Château de Châteldon was purchased by Pierre Laval, who went on to serve as the French Prime Minister from 1942 to 1944, in September 1931. Laval purchased it from Léon Sénèque. As of 2014, the castle belonged to the Josée and René de Chambrun Foundation.

== Nearby towns ==
- Lachaux, Puy-Guillaume and Ris.

== Administration ==
List of the Mayors of Châteldon
Election Date	Name
1790	Jean-Baptiste Couher
1792	Louis Chabrier
1793	Jean-Baptiste Quissac
1800	Michel Delaire
1810	Hugues Debrit
1926	Léon Seneque
1929	Victor Rivet
1940	Charles Cocurat
1964	Victor Ducher
1965	René Verdier
1971	René Verdier
1977	René Verdie
1978	Genès Fradin
1983	Genès Fradin
1989	Jean-Paul Dassaud
1995	Jean-Paul Dassaud
1997	Tony Bernard
2001	Tony Bernard
2008	Tony Bernard
2014	Tony Bernard
2020	Tony Bernard
2026	Tony Bernard

== Demographics ==
Historical population
Year	Pop.	±% p.a.
1968	1,101	—
1975	953	−2.04%
1982	916	−0.56%
1990	840	−1.08%
1999	737	−1.44%
2007	752	+0.25%
2012	778	+0.68%
2017	773	−0.13%
2023	740	−0.72%
Source: INSEE

== Mineral water ==
Châteldon is known for its naturally carbonated mineral water. It was the first mineral water exploited in France and transported by bottles to the Court of Louis XIV in Versailles. This water is used for its diuretic and digestive properties. It is also rich in potassium, sodium and fluorine. In France, one finds the water of Châteldon in the large hotels and restaurants, and in delicatessens. In 1650, the first doctor of the king, Guy-Crescent Fagon, praised the virtues of Châteldon to Louis XIV.

== Notable people ==
Châteldon was the birthplace of Pierre Laval (1883–1945), French politician and his wife Marguerite Laval (1888–1959), born Claussat, the daughter of the mayor of Chateldon Joseph Claussat.

== See also ==
- Communes of the Puy-de-Dôme department
