= Samuel Darchy =

French professional football player (born 1980)

Personal information
- Date of birth: 30 May 1980 (age 46)
- Place of birth: Marvejols, France
- Height: 1.85 m (6 ft 1 in)
- Position: Striker

Team information
- Current team: Rodez AF
- Number: 11

Senior career*
| Years | Team | Apps | (Gls) |
| 1997–1999 | Rodez AF | | |
| 1999–2000 | Bastia (B team) | | |
| 2000–2003 | US Albi | | |
| 2003–2005 | ES Wasquehal | 40 | (13) |
| 2005–2006 | Pau FC | 33 | (12) |
| 2006–2010 | Clermont Foot | 52 | (9) |
| 2010–2012 | Rodez AF | 52 | (9) |
| 2012-2014 | SO Millau | | |
- * Club domestic league appearances and goals as of 15:28, 13 November 2009 (UTC)

Samuel Darchy (born 30 May 1980) is a French former professional footballer.
