= Aldebert de Chambrun (1872–1962) =

French general and aristocrat

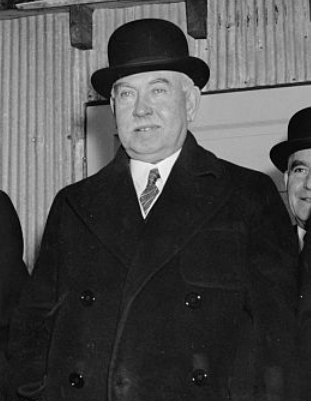
- de Chambrun in 1937
- Born: July 23, 1872; Washington, D.C.
- Died: April 22, 1962 (aged 89); Paris
- Education: École Militaire
- Spouse: Clara Longworth de Chambrun (m. 1901; died 1954)
- Children: René de Chambrun
- Relatives: Charles-Adolphe de Chambrun (father); Marie Henriette Hélène Marthe Tircuy de Corcelle (mother); Francisque de Corcelle (maternal grandfather); Pierre de Chambrun (brother); Charles de Chambrun (brother); Pierre Savorgnan de Brazza (brother-in-law); Nicholas Longworth II (father-in-law); Nicholas Longworth (brother-in-law)
- Military career
- Allegiance: France
- Rank: Général de corps d'armée
- Conflicts: World War I: First Battle of the Marne; Battle of Verdun; Battle of the Somme; Rif War
- Awards: Grand officier de la Légion d'honneur Croix de guerre 1914-1918; Army Distinguished Service Medal; Prix Halphen; Prix Marcelin Guérin

Aldebert de Chambrun (1872–1962) was a French general and a member of the Pineton de Chambrun aristocratic family.

== Early life ==
Aldebert de Chambrun was born on July 23, 1872, in Washington, D.C. He graduated from the École Militaire in 1904.

== Career ==
De Chambrun was as an artillery general in the French Army. He served in the Rif War in Morocco under Hubert Lyautey from the 1920s. He served in Bordeaux from 1932 to 1934.

De Chambrun was appointed as the governor-general of the American Hospital of Paris in Neuilly-sur-Seine in 1941.

== Personal life and death ==
De Chambrun married Clara Longworth de Chambrun. They had a son, René de Chambrun, who married Josée Laval, the daughter of Vichy France Prime Minister Pierre Laval.

De Chambrun died on April 22, 1962, in Paris, France.

== Works ==
- de Chambrun, Aldebert; de Marenches, Charles-Constant-Marie (1919). L'Armée américaine dans le conflit européen. Paris: Payot. OCLC 458081272.
- de Chambrun, Aldebert (1930). Brazza. Paris: Plon. OCLC 3430855.
