= Aldebert de Chambrun (1821–1899) =

French politician and businessman

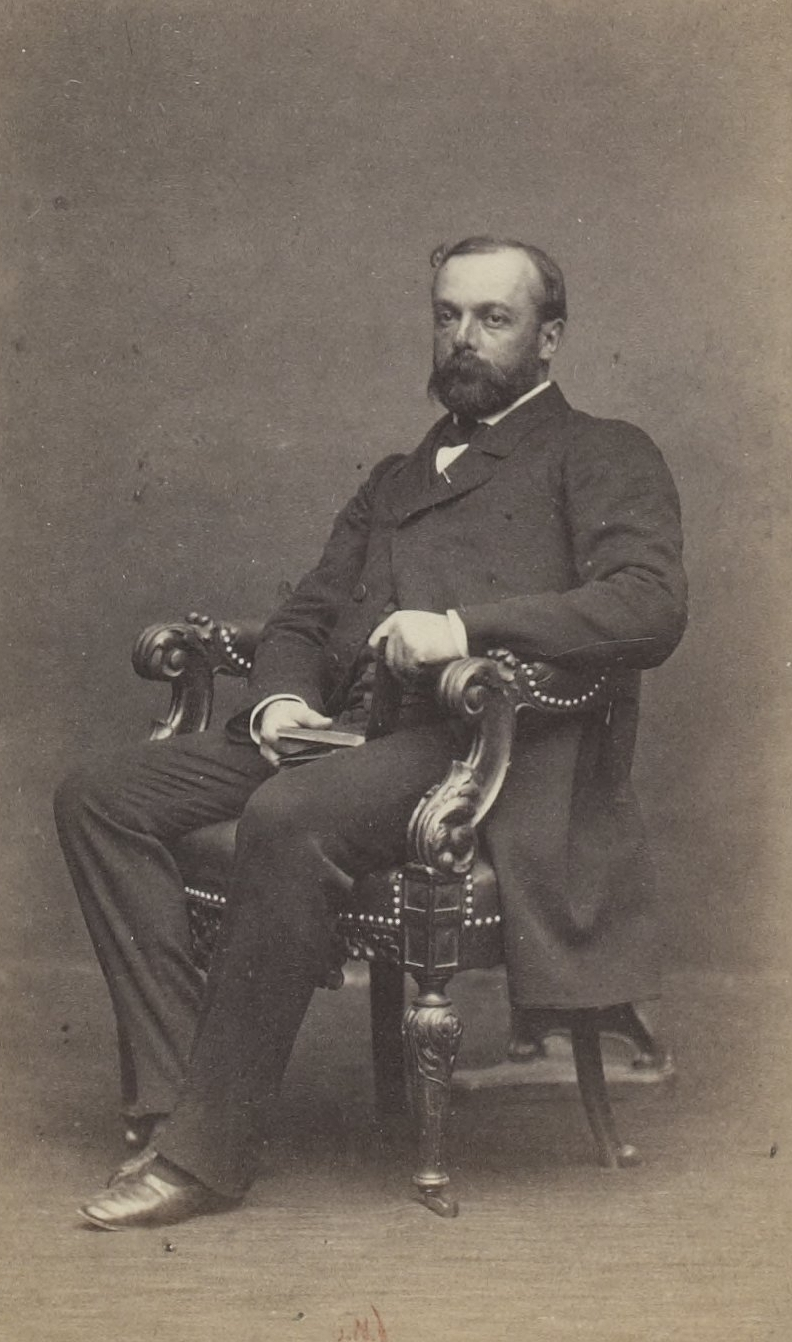
- Born: Joseph-Dominique-Aldebert de Pineton, comte de Chambrun; November 19, 1821; Paris, France
- Died: February 6, 1899 (aged 77); Paris, France
- Occupation: Politician
- Relatives: Charles de Chambrun (brother)

Joseph-Dominique-Aldebert de Pineton, comte de Chambrun or Aldebert de Chambrun (1821–1899) was a French politician and businessman.

== Early life ==
Aldebert de Chambrun was born on November 19, 1821, in Paris, France.

== Career ==
De Chambrun served as the chairman of Baccarat. He served as a member of the Corps législatif from 1857 to 1870, representing Lozère. He served as a member of the Chamber of Deputies from 1871 to 1876, representing Lozère. He served as a member of the French Senate from 1876 to 1879.

== Death ==
De Chambrun died on February 6, 1899.

== Works ==
- de Chambrun, Aldebert (1848). Aux Représentants de la Nation. De la forme du gouvernement. Paris. OCLC 752978055.
- de Chambrun, Aldebert (1848). De la politique de la France en Allemagne. Paris. OCLC 504060042.
- de Chambrun, Aldebert (1872). Fragments politiques. Paris: Garnier frères. OCLC 8096377.
- de Chambrun, Aldebert (1874). De l'Institution d'une régence. Paris: Garnier frères. OCLC 36761778.
- de Chambrun, Aldebert (1882). La Foi, l'Espérance et la Charité. Paris: Garnier frères. OCLC 25963048.
- de Chambrun, Aldebert (1884). Le philosophe et la muse : dialogues sur la musique. Paris: Calmann Lévy. OCLC 15680126.
- de Chambrun, Aldebert (1888). Nos historiens : Guizot, Tocqueville, Thiers. Paris: Calmann Lévy. OCLC 8138875.
- de Chambrun, Aldebert (1889). Ses études politiques et littéraires : comptes rendus de la presse. Paris: Calmann Lévy. OCLC 67502481.
- de Chambrun, Aldebert (1890). Aelia : une étude d'esthétique. Paris: Chamerot. OCLC 162734116.
- de Chambrun, Aldebert (1893). Aux montagnes d'Auvergne; mes conclusions sociologiques. Paris: Calmann Lévy. OCLC 16143489.
- de Chambrun, Aldebert (1898). Wagner à Munich, Francfort, Nice. Paris: Calmann Lévy. OCLC 4243780.
- de Chambrun, Aldebert (1898). Wagner à Carlsrühe, l'artiste du siècle. Paris: Calmann Lévy. OCLC 6034405.
