= Josée and René de Chambrun Foundation =

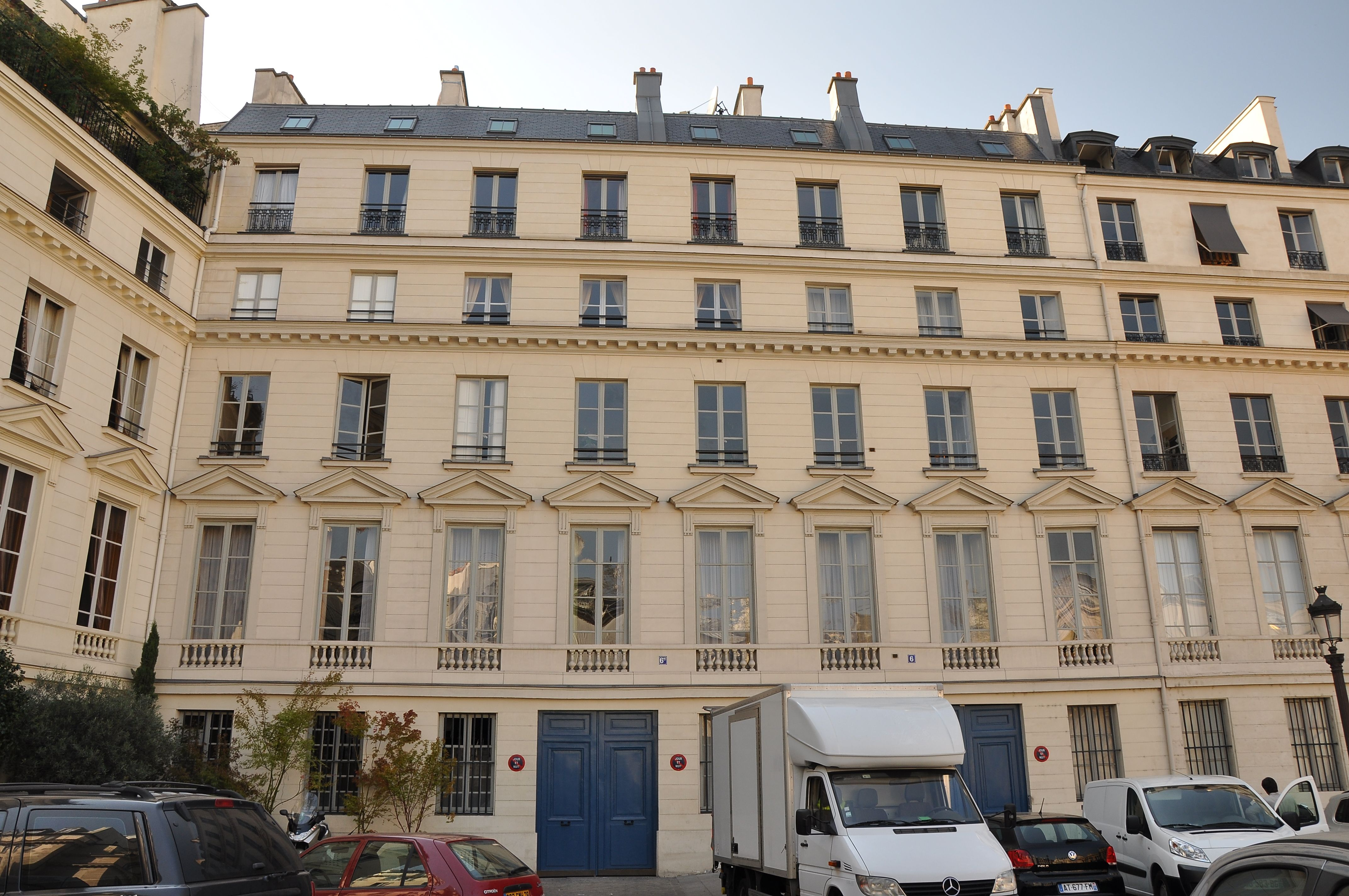
6 bis, Place du Palais-Bourbon.

The Josée and René de Chambrun Foundation (French: Fondation Josée-et-René-de-Chambrun) is a French charitable foundation preserving Lafayette's home Château de la Grange-Bléneau.

Recognized by the French government as a nonprofit organization on October 19, 1959, the Foundation was founded by René de Chambrun (1906–2002), a lawyer at the Court of Appeals of Paris and of the New York State Bar Association and a descendant of Lafayette, as well as a Chevalier (knight) of the Légion d'honneur and honorary president of the Sons of the American Revolution in France, and his wife, Josée Laval (1911–1992), the only daughter of Pierre Laval. René de Chambrun's mother, Clara Longworth de Chambrun (1873–1954), was the sister of Nicholas Longworth.

The original administrators of the Foundation included Maurice Renand, a tax inspector who was the son of Georges–Eugène Renand, chairman of the la Semeuse de Paris, the first manager of La Samaritaine, chair of the Cognac-Jay Foundation, director of the administrative services of the Presidency of the Council in 1942 and a close collaborator of Pierre Laval (1943–1944). His son Georges succeeded Rene de Chambrun as head of the foundation. François Cathala, a descendant of Pierre Cathala and close friend of Pierre Laval, was also an early administrator.

The seat of the organization was changed by decree from Courpalay, Seine-et-Marne to au 6 bis, place du Palais Bourbon, 75007, in Paris, on December 18, 2003.

The main goal of the foundation was the historic preservation of the Château de la Grange-Bléneau, the home of Lafayette from 1802 until his death in 1834, and the conservation of the collections inside it. The castle was purchased in 1935 by Louis de Lasteyrie, a cousin of Lafayette descendant René de Chambrun. The new owners discovered, in an attic, the files of Lafayette. They were classified as historical files in 2003. Visits are limited to researchers and historians.

The foundation also holds the private archives of Pierre Laval and owns the Château de Châteldon, which belonged to the Laval family, along with two medieval houses in the village (maison sergentale and ancienne Pharmacie) as well as 34 percent of crystal manufacturer Baccarat. René de Chambrun was shareholder and president; in 1989, the Foundation sold off a portion to the Taittinger Group, preserving only a minority interest.
