= George Ward Nichols =

American journalist and college president

- Born: June 21, 1831; Tremont, Maine, US
- Died: September 15, 1885 (aged 54); Cincinnati, Ohio, US
- Occupations: Journalist, writer, and college president

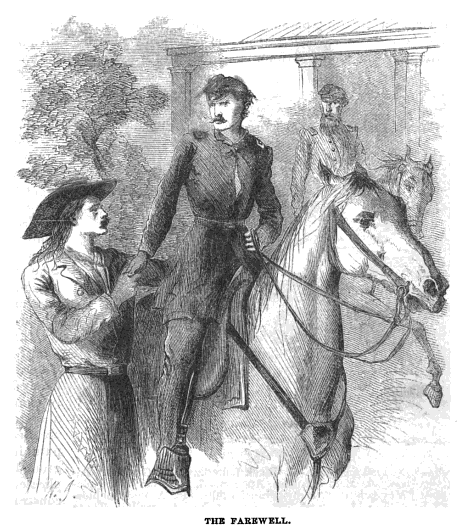
An illustration to the article Wild Bill by George Ward Nichols (Harper’s New Monthly Magazine, February, 1867).

George Ward Nichols (June 21, 1831 - September 15, 1885) was an American journalist known as the creator of the legend of Wild Bill Hickok.

Nichols was born on June 21, 1831, in Tremont, Maine. During American Civil War he served under General John C. Fremont and General William Sherman. He wrote The Story of the Great March (1865). The book was translated on several languages.

"The plantation negroes are the most ignorant and debased of any I have ever seen. As nearly as I can ascertain, it has been the effort of the South Carolina master to degrade his slaves as low in the scale of human nature, and as near the mules and oxen which he owns in common with them, as possible. It makes one's blood boil to see the evidences of the heartlessness and cruelty of these white men. I firmly believe that we are God's instruments of justice, and that they are at last called to account for this shameless crime."

— George Ward Nichols, comments upon the Union capture of Orangeburg, South Carolina, February 12, 1865

In September 1865 Nichols arrived in Springfield, Missouri, where he met James Butler "Wild Bill" Hickok. The article Wild Bill by Nichols appeared in Harper’s New Monthly Magazine in February 1867. The publication immortalized Wild Bill. Kansas newspapers criticized Nichols for exaggerated exploits of the gunfighter.

Later Nichols moved to Cincinnati, where he helped found and became the president of the College of Music of Cincinnati in 1878.

From 1868 until his death he was married to Maria Longworth Nichols Storer The couple had two children: Joseph and Margaret, wife of French politician Pierre de Chambrun. Nichols died from tuberculosis on September 15, 1885.

== Works ==
- The Story of the Great March: From the Diary of a Staff Officer (1865).
- The Sanctuary: A Story of the Civil War (1866).
- Art Education Applied to Industry (1877).
- Pottery; How it is Made, Its Shape and Decoration (1878).
- The Cincinnati Organ: With a Brief Description of the Cincinnati Music Hall (1878).

== Bibliography ==
- Rosa J. G. George Ward Nichols and the Legend of Wild Bill Hickok // Arizona and the West. Vol. 19, No.. 2, Summer, 1977. P. 135–162.
- Rosa J. G. They Called Him Wild Bill: The Life and Adventures of James Butler Hickok. University of Oklahoma Press. 2012.
- Thrapp D. L. Encyclopedia of Frontier Biography, Volume 2: G-O. University of Nebraska Press. 1991. P. 1054.
