= Château de la Grange-Bléneau =

Castle in Seine-et-Marne, France

Coordinates: 48°39′43″N 2°56′59″E

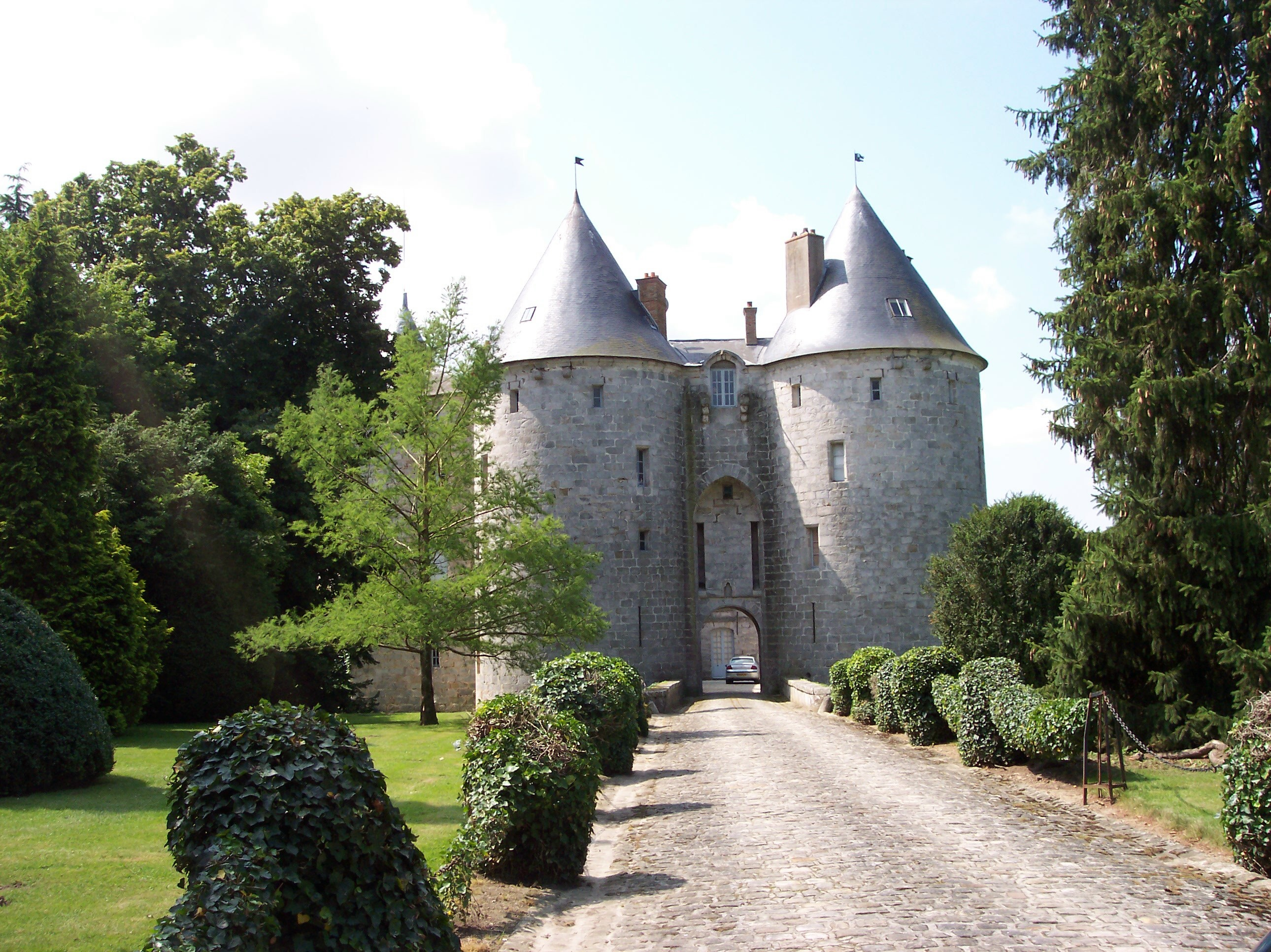
Château de la Grange-Bléneau

The Château de la Grange-Bléneau is a castle in the commune of Courpalay in the Seine-et-Marne département of France.

== History ==
The castle was built in the 14th century. It was altered in the 17th century. Over the years, the castle has belonged to several families: Courtenay, Aubusson-La Feuillade and d'Aguesseau. Ownership passed from Henriette d'Aguesseau to her daughter Adrienne de La Fayette. She passed it on to her husband, General Gilbert du Motier, Marquis de Lafayette, who lived there from 1802 until his death in 1834. Eight years after La Fayette's death, his grandson Jules de Lasteyrie (1810–1883) married Olivia de Rohan-Chabot (1813–1899), the daughter of the émigré Louis de Rohan, Vicomte de Chabot, and Lady Charlotte Fitzgerald, daughter of the second Duke of Leinster. They lived at la Grange-Bléneau for 54 years. Their son, Louis de Lasteyrie, sold the home to his cousin, René de Chambrun, in 1935, with a life tenancy.

Upon the death of his cousin in 1955, René de Chambrun discovered the large cache of documents in the attic, and he founded a private museum to Lafayette. He organized and described the family archives, a collection dating from 1457 to 1990. The papers were microfilmed at La Grange in 1995 and 1996, for the Library of Congress. Today, it is the property of the Josée and René de Chambrun Foundation, a charitable foundation charged with preserving the castle and its historical contents.

== Architectural significance ==
It has been listed as a monument historique by the French Ministry of Culture since April 15, 1942.

== See also ==
- List of castles in France
