= Charles de Chambrun (politician, born 1827) =

French politician

- Born: Charles, Emmanuel Pineton de Chambrun; January 14, 1827; Paris, France
- Died: November 24, 1880 (aged 53); Haudemont, Meurthe-et-Moselle, France
- Occupation: Politician
- Relatives: Aldebert de Chambrun (brother)

Charles de Chambrun (1827–1880) was a French politician.

== Early life ==
Charles de Chambrun was born on January 14, 1827, in Paris, France.

== Career ==
De Chambrun served as a member of the Chamber of Deputies from 1876 to 1880, representing Lozère.

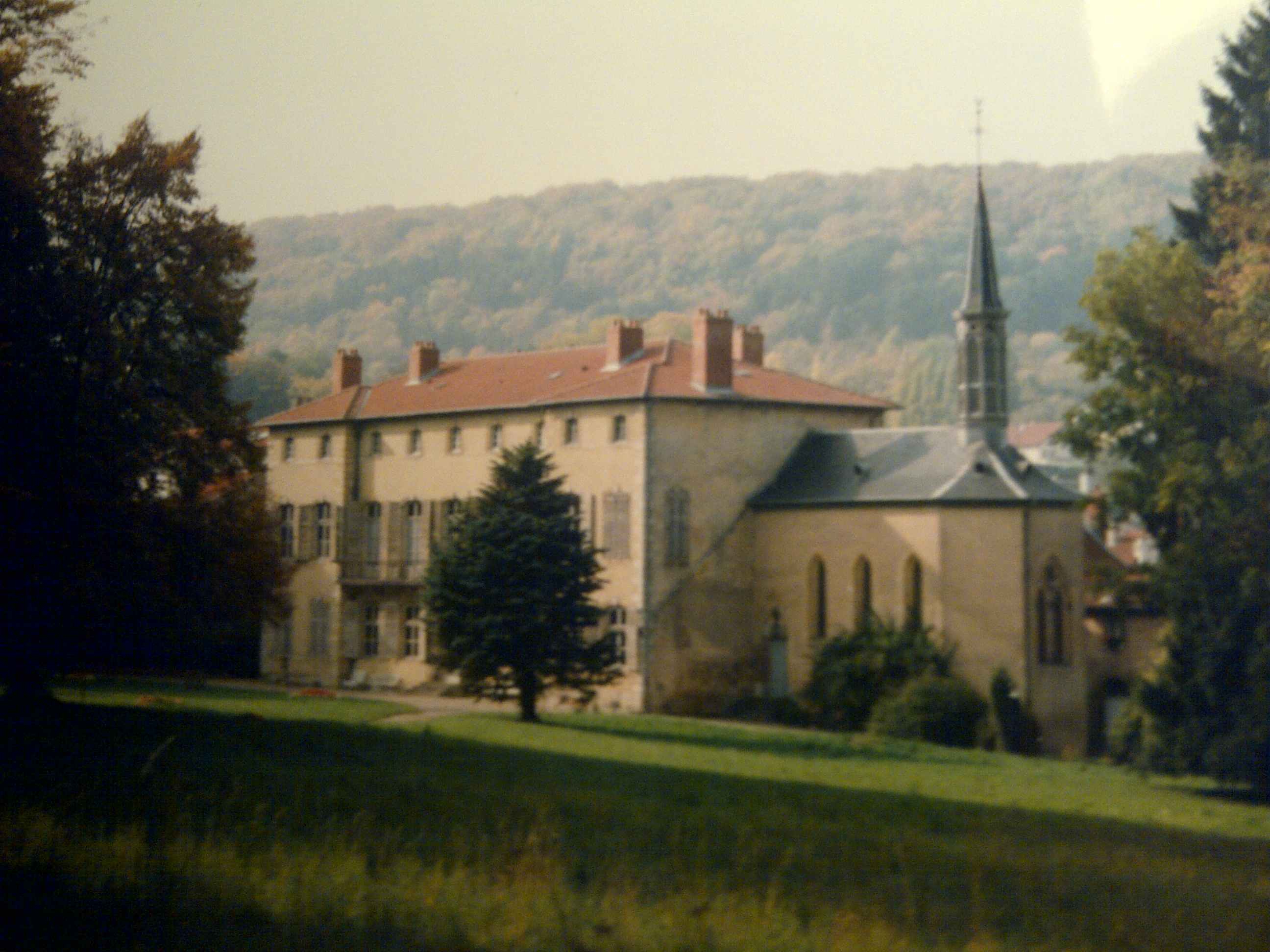
Château de Chambrun.

== Death ==
De Chambrun died on November 24, 1880, in Haudemont, France.
