= Clara Longworth de Chambrun =

American author and patron of the arts (1873–1954)

The Comtesse de Chambrun
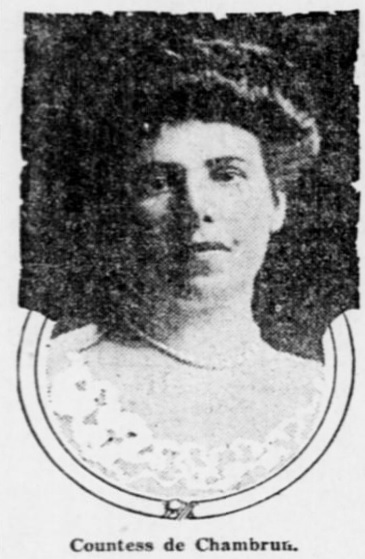
- Born: Clara Eleanor Longworth; October 18, 1873; Mount Adams, Cincinnati
- Died: June 1, 1954 (aged 80); Paris
- Resting place: Picpus Cemetery
- Education: Sorbonne
- Spouse: Count Aldebert de Chambrun (m. 1901)
- Parent(s): Nicholas Longworth II; Susan Walker
- Relatives: Nicholas Longworth (brother)

Clara Eleanor Longworth de Chambrun, Comtesse de Chambrun (October 18, 1873 – June 1, 1954) was an American patron of the arts and scholar of Shakespeare.

== Early life ==
Longworth de Chambrun was born in Cincinnati, Ohio on October 18, 1873. She was a daughter of Nicholas Longworth and the former Susan Walker. She belonged to a wealthy family that was involved in Ohio politics. Her father was an Ohio State Supreme Court judge, and her brother (also named Nicholas Longworth) was a congressman from Ohio for three decades, eventually becoming Speaker of the United States House of Representatives from 1925-31. He married Alice Roosevelt (daughter of President Theodore Roosevelt) in 1906. She was reputed to dislike Alice. She was friends with Josephine Crane, the second wife of Winthrop M. Crane, governor of Massachusetts.

She was attendant at her cousin Margaret Rives Nichols's marriage to the Marquis Pierre de Chambrun (elder brother of diplomat and writer Charles de Chambrun) on December 12, 1895.

== Career ==
In 1921, the same year that her daughter died, she earned a doctorate from the Sorbonne, at the age of 48, and five years later she received the Bordin Prize of the Académie française for a book on Shakespeare which she wrote in French. She was one of the founding members of the American Library in Paris, and served as a trustee from 1921 through 1924. This was followed in 1928 by her election as a Chevalier of the French Legion of Honour.

Through her son's marriage to the daughter of the Premier of France, the Countess was able to keep the American Library in Paris open even after France's declaration of war in September 1939, organized an administrative set-up which made it possible to keep it independent after the U.S. entered the war. She acted as its director until the fall of 1944 when her ties to Laval became a liability. Before she died, however, thanks were given to her for her actions.

== Personal life ==
She married Count Aldebert de Chambrun, later General de Chambrun, a direct descendant of the Marquis de Lafayette on February 19, 1901 in Cincinnati. Aldebert was the French Military attaché in Washington, D.C. at one time, before serving as an artillery officer in World War I. He is reputed to have written his wife about the pleasure he had in shelling his own château, near Saint-Mihiel, with artillery as part of a six-week siege because it was occupied by German forces, though this later turned out to be a hoax. Together, they were the parents of two children:

- Suzanne Eleanore de Chambrun (1902–1921), who died of heart disease in Paris.
- René de Chambrun (1906–2002), who married Josée Laval in 1935. Josée was the daughter of Pierre Laval, who was then serving as Premier of France.

In the fall of 1935, the countess rented her apartment at 58 rue de Vaugirard, at the corner of the Luxembourg Garden to the young poet Elizabeth Bishop, where Bishop wrote "Cirque d'Hiver", her first poem to be published in The New Yorker, and "Paris, 7 AM".

== Works ==
The Silver Sheet, a studio publication promoting Thomas Ince Productions, cover illustration of Playing with Souls by Clara Longworth de Chambrun

- Pieces of the Game: A Modern Instance. 1915. ISBN 978-1-4371-0045-7.
- Playing with Souls: A Novel, 1922.
- Giovanni Florio - Un apôtre de la Renaissance en Angleterre à l'époque de Shakespeare, 1922.
- Shakespeare, acteur-poète, 1926.
- Shakespeare, Actor-poet: As Seen by his Associates, Explained by Himself and Remembered by the Succeeding Generation, 1927.
- His Wife's Romance, 1929.
- Hamlet, de Shakespeare, 1931.
- The Making of Nicholas Longworth: Annals of an American Family. New York. 1933. ISBN 978-0-8369-5882-9.
- Two Loves I Have: The Romance of William Shakespeare. Philadelphia: J.B. Lippincott, 1934.
- Shadows like Myself. New York: C. Scribner's Sons. 1936.
- Cincinnati: Story of the Queen City. New York: Scribner, 1939.
- Shakespeare retrouvé, 1948.
- Shadows Lengthen: The Story of My Life. New York: C. Scribner's Sons. 1949.
- Shakespeare: A Portrait Restored. New York: Hollis & Carter. 1957.
