= Pierre de Chambrun =

French politician

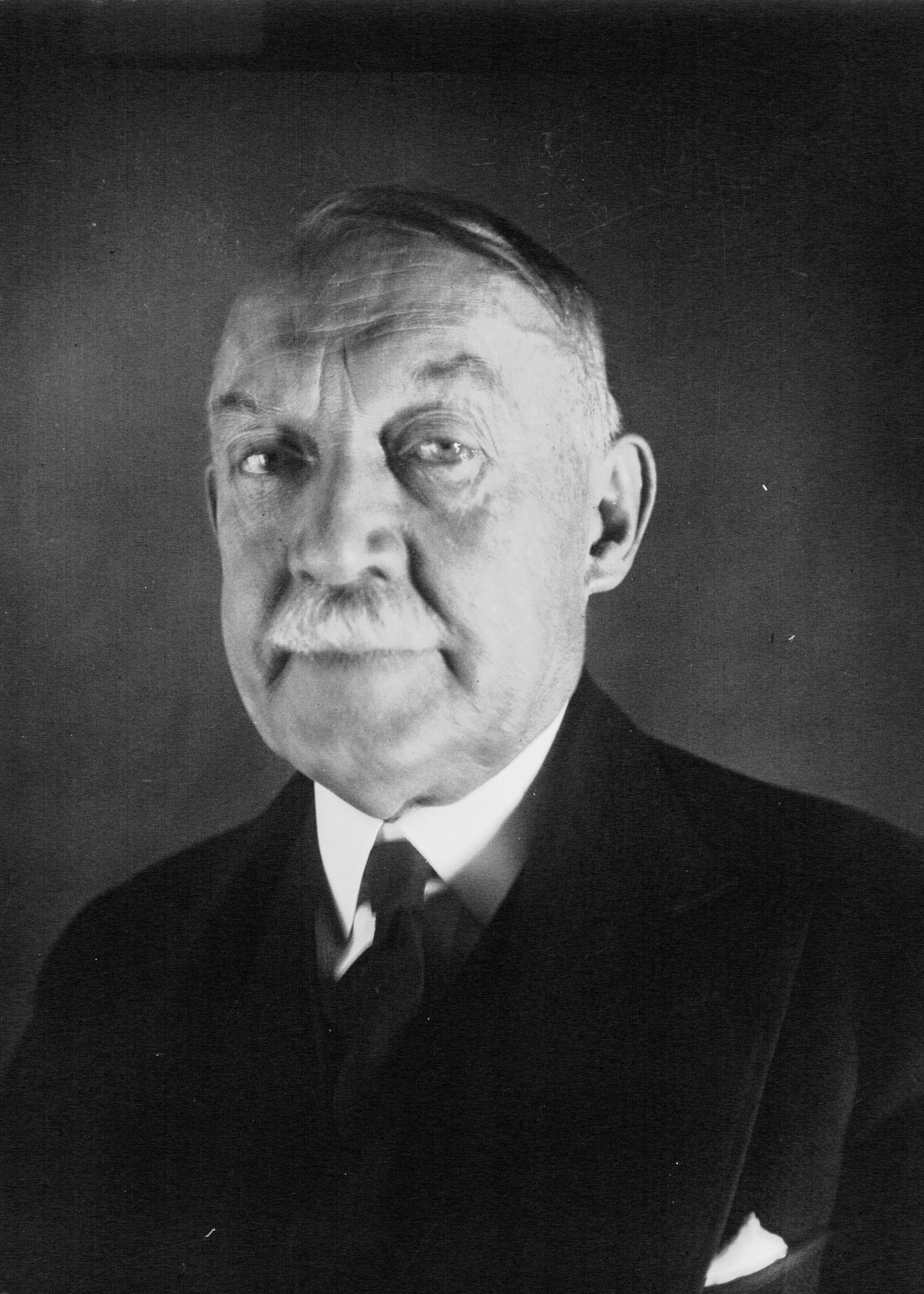
- Pierre Chambrun in 1933

Personal details
- Born: 11 June 1865 Paris, France
- Died: 24 August 1954 (aged 89) Marvejols, Lozère, France
- Parent(s): Charles-Adolphe de Chambrun; Marie Henriette Hélène Marthe Tircuy de Corcelle
- Relatives: Charles de Chambrun (brother); Pierre Savorgnan de Brazza (brother-in-law); René de Chambrun (nephew)

Pierre de Chambrun (11 June 1865 – 24 August 1954) was a French politician.

== Early life ==
Charles Louis Antoine Pierre Gilbert Pineton de Chambrun was born in Paris. The Pineton de Chambrun family was of noble origin and politically prominent, providing several members of the Senate of France and the Chamber of Deputies of France representing Lozère.

== Career ==
Chambrun trained as a lawyer and was appointed in 1892 to replace his brother as legal council at the French embassy in the United States. He returned to France in 1897 and in 1898 was elected to the Chamber to represent Lozère, being reelected at each election until 1933 when he instead was elected to the senate. Chambrun was associated with various centre-right groupings, including the Republican Federation, Democratic Republican Alliance and the Popular Democratic Party.

Chambrun returned to the United States in 1917 as a member of René Viviani's diplomatic mission and again in 1925 with Joseph Caillaux to discuss French war debts. He served on many commissions in the Chamber and Senate. During the Second World War, in June 1940, he was the only senator to vote against the abolition of the French constitution and was one of the eighty members of the French parliament who voted against the grant of special powers to Philippe Pétain and the creation of the Vichy régime.

After the war he served in the Provisional Consultative Assembly from 1944 to 1945. In 1947 he received the Croix de guerre 1939-1945 for his work during the Second World War and was made a Chevalier of the Légion d'honneur.

== Personal life and death ==
Chambrun married on 12 December 1895 Margaret Rives Nichols (daughter of George Ward Nichols and Maria Longworth) and had a son, Gilbert de Chambrun, who became a politician. He died on 24 August 1954 in Marvejols in Lozère, at the age of 89. His grandson, Charles de Chambrun, also became a politician.
