= Marvejols =

- Commune
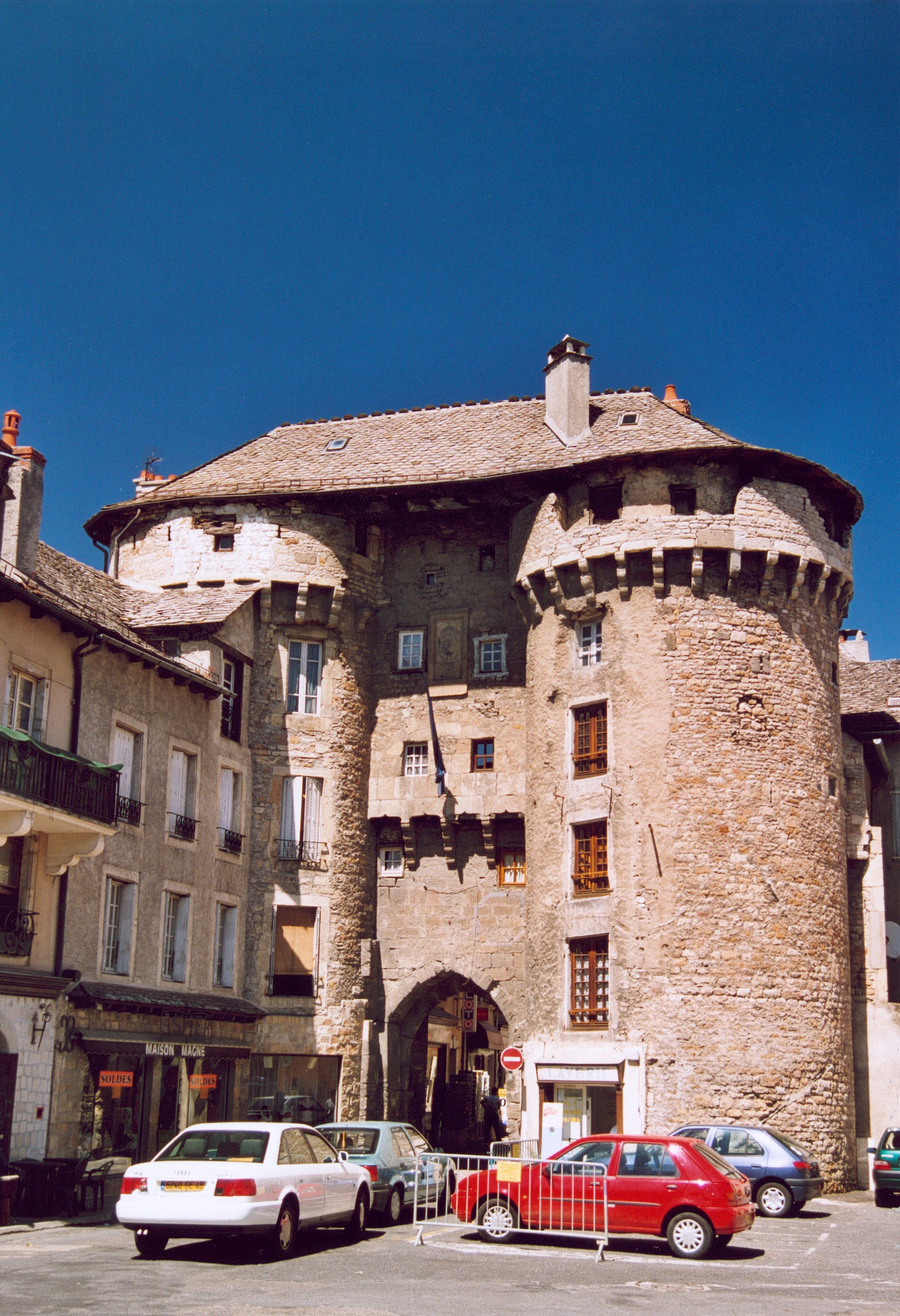
- The Porte de Chanelles

- Coat of arms
- Location of Marvejols
- Location within France Location within Occitanie
- Coordinates: 44°33′15″N 3°17′27″E
- Country: France
- Region: Occitania
- Department: Lozère
- Arrondissement: Mende
- Canton: Marvejols
- Intercommunality: Gévaudan

Government
  - Mayor (2021–2026): Patricia Brémond
- Area^{1}: 12.45 km^{2} (4.81 sq mi)
- Elevation: 640 m (2,100 ft)
- Highest elevation: 918 m (3,012 ft)
- Lowest elevation: 632 m (2,073 ft)
- Population (2023): 4,764
  - Density: 382.7/km^{2} (991.1/sq mi)
- Time zone: UTC+01:00 (CET)
  - Summer (DST): UTC+02:00 (CEST)
- INSEE/Postal code: 48092 /48100
- Website: www.ville-marvejols.fr
- ^{1} French Land Register data, which excludes lakes, ponds, glaciers > 1 km^{2} (0.386 sq mi or 247 acres) and river estuaries.

Marvejols (French pronunciation: [maʁvəʒɔl]; Occitan: Maruèjols) is a commune in the southern French department of Lozère.

Its inhabitants are known as Marvejolais.

== Geography ==
The commune is located in the Massif central. The Colagne flows southward through the middle of the commune and crosses the town.

== History ==
A medieval city exemplifying the Occitan culture, Marvejols was strengthened during the Hundred Years War against the English.

Following the St. Bartholomew's Day massacre, the town walls were reinforced to protect the Huguenot population during the French Wars of Religion, Protestant Capt. Matthieu Merle based himself at Marvejols during his conquest of the Gévaudan.

But, having sided with the then Protestant Henri of Navarre, the future King Henry IV of France, the town was besieged and burned to the ground by the Catholics. Henry had it rebuilt in 1601 in recognition of the town's support for him.

== Population ==
Historical population
Year	Pop.	±% p.a.
1968	4,490	—
1975	5,296	+2.39%
1982	5,573	+0.73%
1990	5,476	−0.22%
1999	5,501	+0.05%
2007	5,071	−1.01%
2012	4,950	−0.48%
2017	4,722	−0.94%
2023	4,764	+0.15%
Source: INSEE

== Monuments and sights ==
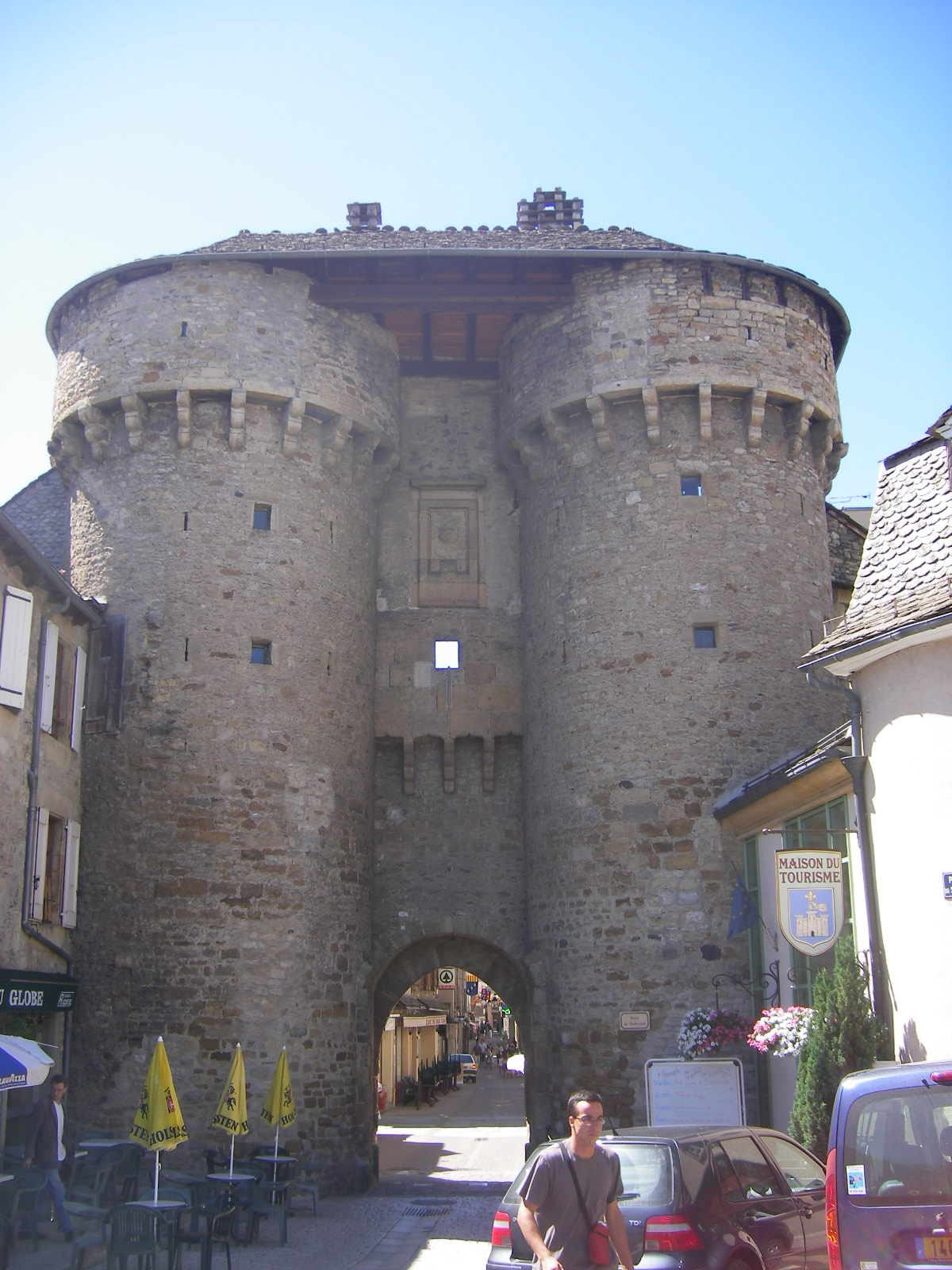
Porte Soubeyran, the north gate

- La porte du Soubeyran, a town gateway dating from the fourteenth century. Two other medieval gates survive, La Porte de Chanelles to the south and the smaller Porte du Therond, to the east. Despite some 17th-century repairs, they still keep their medieval charm.

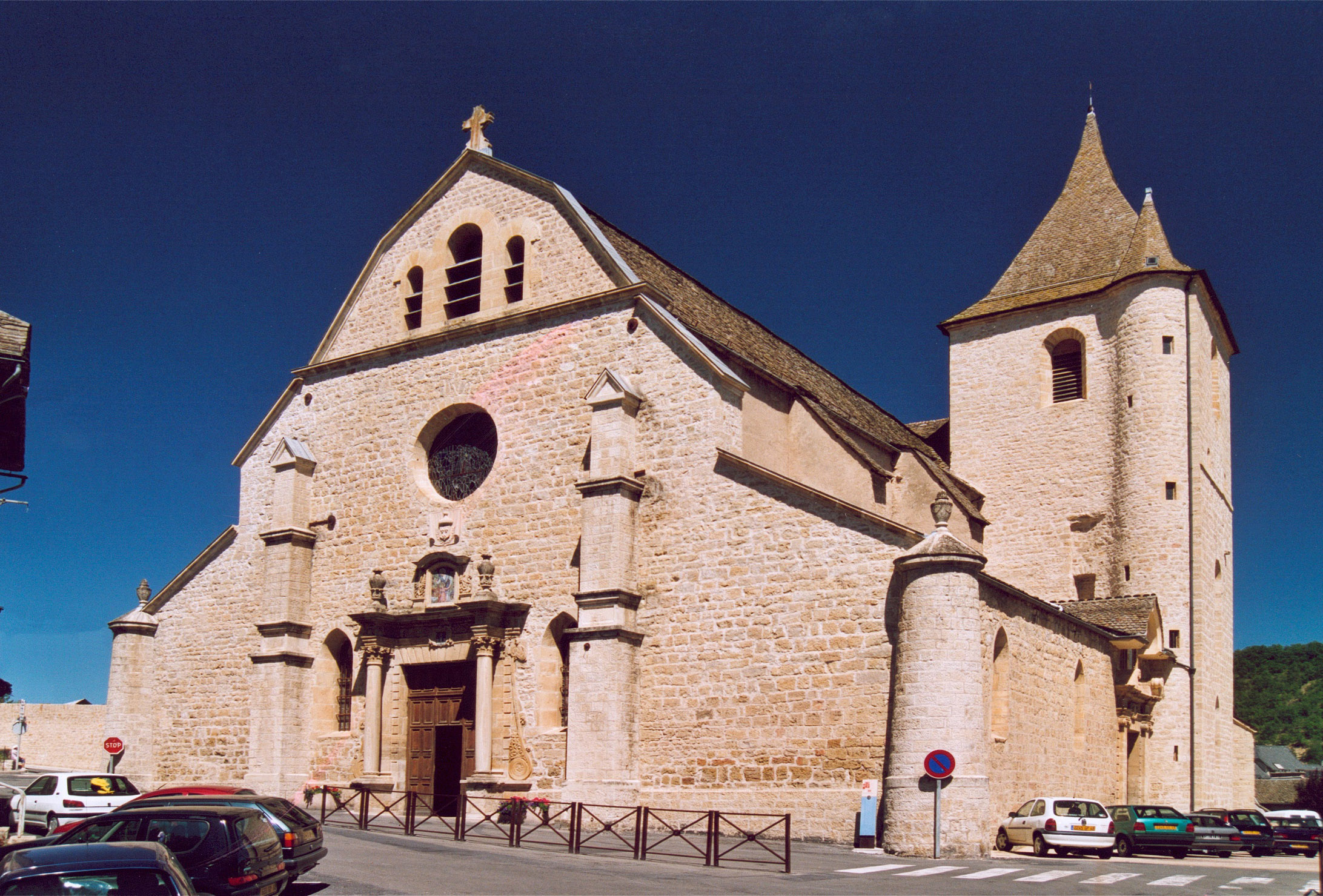
Notre Dame de la Carce

- Notre Dame de la Carce dating from the end of the 13th century, becoming collegiate in 1310.
- Two large bronze sculptures by Emmanuel Auricoste can be seen at two of the entrances to Marvejols. One represents the mythical Beast of Gévaudan, the other, that of Henry IV of France, inscribed "exécuté à Marvejols en 1954" (Executed in 1954), which refers, of course, to the date of the sculpture, not the King's demise.
- The wolf park of Gévaudan: Over 100 wolves live in a semi-natural state in an area of hills above Marvejols, once renowned for the animals.

== Culture ==
Croix occitane

Espoir Oc (Hope for Oc) is an association founded about twenty years ago, to promote and develop the Occitan language and culture. Based in Marvejols, they organize, on the first weekend of July, a festival based on the theme of the Middle Ages. Two big events take place; on the Saturday evening a great banquet consisting entirely of regional produce, finishing with a dance; on the Sunday morning, the mass is said in Occitan.

== Notable people ==
- Rock band Subway is made up of four women, all originally from Marvejols.
- Gilbert de Chambrun, mayor (1953–1965).
- Armand Blanquet du Chayla, French admiral.
- Samuel Darchy, footballer

== In popular culture ==
The latter part of the story in the movie Betty Blue takes place in Marvejols.

== Twin town ==
Colombo, Sri Lanka

Cockermouth, UK

== See also ==
- Communes of the Lozère département
