= Charles de Chambrun (diplomat) =

His Excellency Count Charles de Chambrun

French Ambassador to Italy
- In office 1933–1936
- Preceded by: Henry de Jouvenel
- Succeeded by: Jules François Blondel

French Ambassador to Turkey
- In office 1928–1933
- Preceded by: Émile Daeschner
- Succeeded by: Albert Kammerer

French Minister to Greece
- In office 1924–1926
- Preceded by: Henri Chassain de Marcilly
- Succeeded by: Louis Frédéric Clément-Simon

Personal details
- Born: Louis Charles Pineton de Chambrun; 10 February 1875 Washington, D.C., United States
- Died: 6 November 1952 (aged 77) Paris, France
- Spouse: Marie de Rohan-Chabot (m. 1934; died 1951)
- Parent(s): Charles-Adolphe de Chambrun; Marthe Tircuy de Corcelle
- Relatives: Pierre de Chambrun (brother); René de Chambrun (nephew)
- Occupation: Diplomat, writer
- Known for: Member of the Académie française

Count Louis Charles Pineton de Chambrun (10 February 1875 – 6 November 1952) was a French diplomat and writer.

== Early life ==
Chambrun was born on 10 February 1875 in Washington, D.C., where his father, Charles-Adolphe de Chambrun, Marquis of Chambrun, was a judicial counsellor at the Embassy of France, Washington, D.C. His mother was Marie Henriette Hélène Marthe Tircuy de Corcelle (a great-granddaughter of the Gilbert du Motier, Marquis de Lafayette). His siblings included Pierre de Chambrun, Marquis of Chambrun (who married American heiress Margaret Rives Nichols); General Count Aldebert de Chambrun (who married Clara Eleanor Longworth, a cousin of Pierre's wife who was sister-in-law to Alice Roosevelt Longworth); and Thérèse de Chambrun (who married explorer Pierre Savorgnan de Brazza).

Through his brother Aldebert, he was uncle to Count René de Chambrun, the French-American lawyer and businessman who married Josée Laval (a daughter of Prime Minister Pierre Laval).

== Career ==
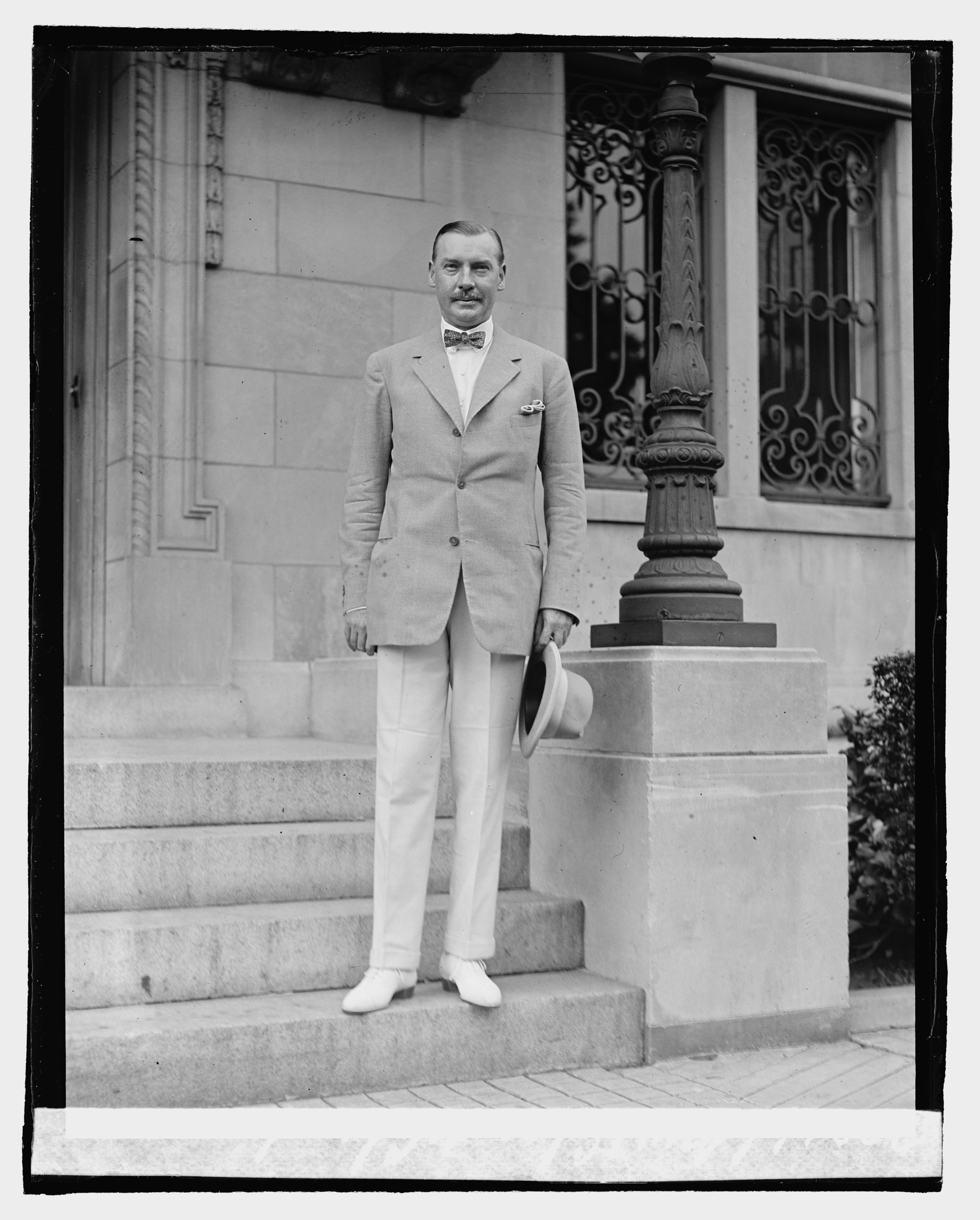
Count de Chambrun, 1922

Charles served as attaché to France's ambassador to the Vatican, Berlin, then Washington, D.C. In 1914, he became First Secretary at the St Petersburg embassy, and later served in Athens and Vienna. From 1928 to 1933, he represented France in Ankara and then became ambassador to Rome from 1933 to 1935 during the midst of Fascist Italy.

In March 1937, as he was about to board the train to Brussels with his wife, Magda Fontanges, the former mistress of Benito Mussolini, shot him twice at the Gare du Nord because she thought he was behind her expulsion from Italy. Maître René Floriot defended Fontanges, who only served a one-year suspended prison sentence for her crime.

=== Académie française ===
With Paul Claudel, Maurice Garçon, Marcel Pagnol, Jules Romains and Henri Mondor, he was one of six people elected on 4 April 1946 to the Académie française in the second group election to fill the numerous empty seats caused by the lack of elections during the German occupation of France.

Chambrun was made a Grand officer of the Légion d'Honneur in 1936.

== Personal life ==
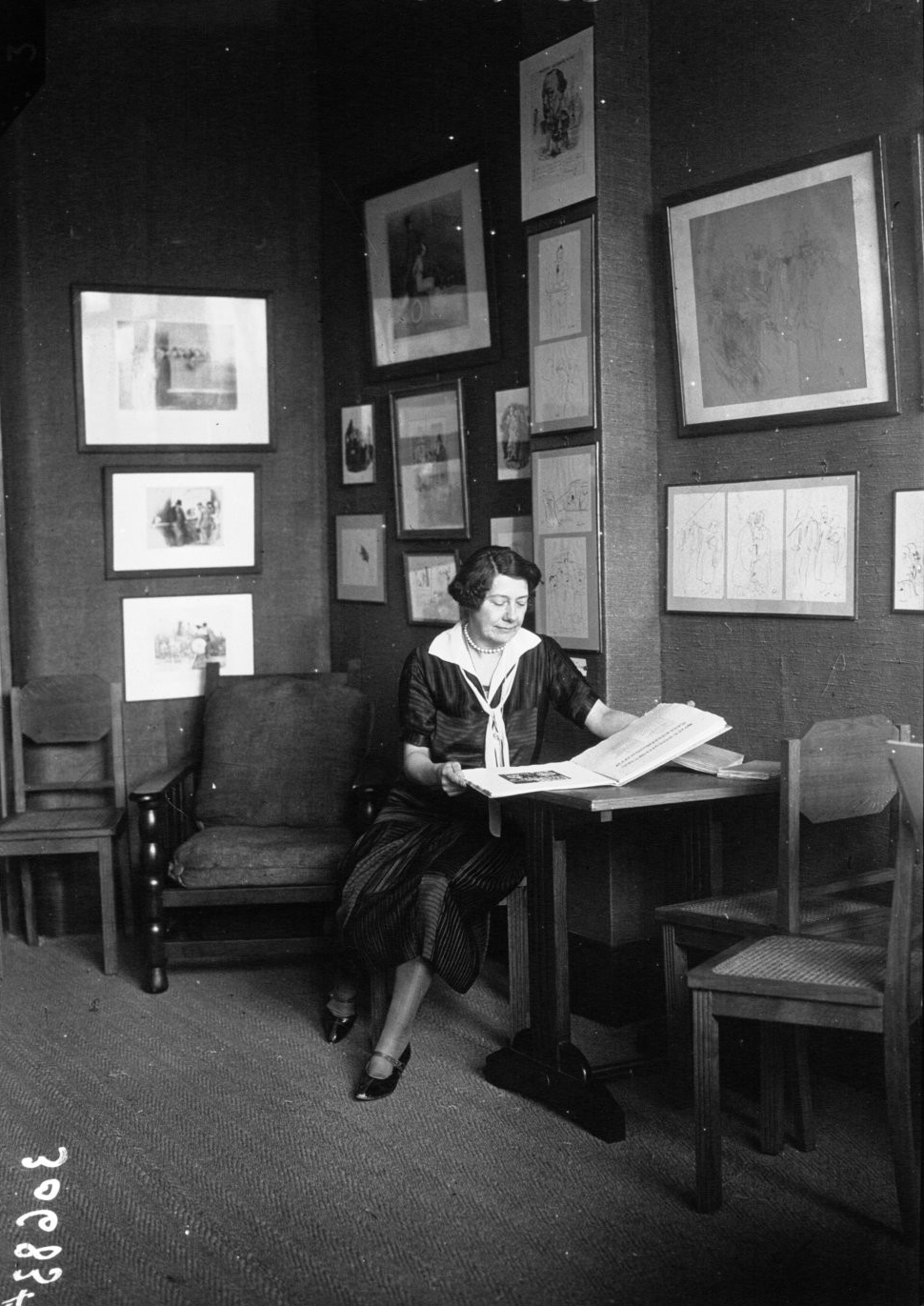
Photograph of his wife, the Princess Murat, 1926

While in Rome, he married Marie Augustine de Rohan-Chabot (1876–1951) at the Capitol building in Rome. The widow of Prince Lucien Murat, she was a daughter of the Alain de Rohan-Chabot, 11th Duke of Rohan, and Herminie, Duchess of Rohan (née de La Brousse de Verteillac). She was a writer, galleriste and landscape and portrait painter. Her older sister, Marie-Joséphine de Rohan-Chabot, was the wife of Napoléon Louis de Talleyrand-Périgord (grandson of Louis de Talleyrand-Périgord and nephew of Boson de Talleyrand-Périgord).

The Countess de Chambrun died in Paris on 10 October 1951. Count de Chambrun died at his residence in Paris on 6 November 1952.

== Works ==
Charles de Chambrun

- Lettres à Marie, Pétersbourg-Pétrograd, 1914–1918 (1941)
- Atatürk et la Turquie nouvelle (1939)
- À l'école d'un diplomate : Vergennes (1944)
- L'Esprit de la diplomatie (1944)
- Traditions et souvenirs (1952)

Marie de Rohan Chabot (under the name Marie de Chambrun)

- Le Roi de Rome, Plon, 1941

Marie de Rohan Chabot (under the name Princesse Lucien Murat)

- Raspoutine et l'aube sanglante, De Boccard, s.d.
- La reine Christine de Suède, Flammarion, 1934
- Les Errants de la Gloire, Flammarion, 1933
- La vie amoureuse de la Grande Catherine coll. « Leurs amours », Flammarion, 1927
