= René de Chambrun =

French businessman (1906–2002)

Count René de Chambrun
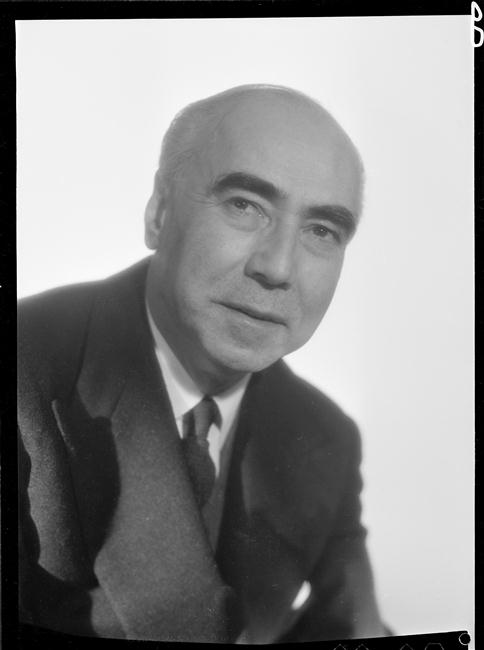
- Born: Count René Aldebert Pineton de Chambrun; 23 August 1906; Paris, France
- Died: 19 May 2002 (aged 95); Paris, France
- Resting place: Montparnasse Cemetery
- Education: Sciences Po; University of Paris
- Occupations: Lawyer, businessman
- Spouse: Josée Laval (m. 1935; died 1992)
- Parent(s): Aldebert de Chambrun; Clara Eleanor Longworth
- Relatives: Gilbert du Motier, marquis de La Fayette (great-great-grandfather); Nicholas Longworth (maternal great-great-grandfather); Nicholas Longworth II (maternal grandfather); Nicholas Longworth (maternal uncle); Adolphe de Chambrun (paternal grandfather); Charles de Chambrun (paternal uncle); Pierre de Chambrun (paternal uncle); Pierre Savorgnan de Brazza (paternal uncle); Pierre Laval (father-in-law)

Count René Aldebert Pineton de Chambrun (French pronunciation: [ʁəne aldəbɛʁ pintɔ̃ də ʃɑ̃bʁœ̃]; 23 August 1906 – 19 May 2002) was a French-American aristocrat, lawyer, businessman and author. He practised law at the Court of Appeals of Paris and the New York State Bar Association. He was the author of several books about World War II and his father-in-law, Vichy France Prime Minister Pierre Laval, to whom he served as legal counsel. He defended Coco Chanel in her lawsuit against Pierre Wertheimer over her marketing rights to Chanel No. 5. He was the chairman of Baccarat, the crystal manufacturer, from 1960 to 1992.

== Early life ==
Count René de Chambrun was born on 23 August 1906 in Paris, France. His father, Aldebert de Chambrun, was a general in the French Army, and his mother was Clara Eleanor Longworth, sister of Nicholas Longworth, who married Alice Roosevelt, the daughter of the US President Theodore Roosevelt. On his paternal side, he was a member of the aristocratic Pineton de Chambrun family. Moreover, Pierre Savorgnan de Brazza was one of his paternal uncles. Chambrun's godfathers were Philippe Pétain and President William Howard Taft.

Chambrun was a great-great-grandson of Lafayette. As a result, he was both a French and US. citizen. His US citizenship was questioned by members of the US House of Representatives in 1942 for his support of his father-in-law, Pierre Laval.

Chambrun graduated from Sciences Po. He received a PhD in Law from the University of Paris.

== Career ==
Chambrun was a lawyer at the Court of Appeals of Paris and the New York State Bar Association. By 1935, he helped establish a Franco-American cultural center in New York City to promote bilateral relations. The center was aimed at students and businessmen.

When the Second World War broke out, Chambrun served as a captain, but with the collapse of France looming by mid-May 1940, French Prime Minister Paul Reynaud sent Chambrun as a special emissary to Washington to stiffen President Roosevelt's resolve to help the Allies. Between his first meeting with Roosevelt on 16 June and his last on 1 August, Reynaud's government had fallen. Later that year, Chambrun published the book I Saw France Fall, which helped to alert American opinion about the fate of his country.

After the Liberation of France and the consequent fall of Laval's collaborationist government, Chambrun was a defender of Laval:

Father-in-law wants a big trial which will illuminate everything, if he is given time to prepare his defence, if he is allowed to speak, to call witnesses and to obtain from abroad the information and documents which he needs, he will confound his accusers.

The Chambruns threw themselves into the task of assisting Laval in his defense before the High Court of Justice. After Laval's sentence and execution in October 1945, Chambrun was put on police watch in Paris on the suspicion that he may have helped the Nazis during the war. In 1942, Chambrun had been named on a list of French collaborators with Germany to be killed during the war or tried after it. By 1947, Chambrun officially applied for a US passport.

Meanwhile, Chambrun and his wife devoted their energies over the following decades to the cause of his rehabilitation in the eyes of history. For example, he wrote a letter to President Dwight Eisenhower in which he objected to his characterisation of Laval as "Hitler's most evil puppet" in his 1948 memoir entitled Crusade in Europe. Chambrun based his argument on another book, authored by Spanish Foreign Minister Ramón Serrano Suñer, in which the latter quoted Hitler describing Laval as "no better than De Gaulle." By 1949, Eisenhower agreed to remove the passage from subsequent reprints. A decade later, in 1959, his wife wrote the foreword of Tout ce qu'on vous a cache, a book based on "German secret files" authored by Jacques Baraduc, Laval's lawyer. The book attempted to show that Laval "refused repeatedly to yield to German demands for a reduction in the number of United States agents in French North Africa and a limitation on their activity."

In 1969, Chambrun made an appearance in Marcel Ophüls's documentary on collaboration between the Vichy government and Nazi Germany during World War II, The Sorrow and the Pity (Le chagrin et la pitié). Chambrun wrote three books on the subject between 1983 and 1990. The Chambruns set up a foundation, the Josée and René de Chambrun Foundation, which collected documents on Laval for publication by the Hoover Institution. After Laval's death, the Chambruns brought flowers to his grave every 15 October to commemorate the day that he was executed.

After World War II, Chambrun was hired by King Peter II of Yugoslavia when the latter filed for divorce in 1953; the couple reconciled two years later. He represented the fashion designer Coco Chanel when she sued manufacturer Pierre Wertheimer to regain the marketing rights to her perfume, Chanel No. 5. Wertheimer settled the case, and Chanel became a millionaire as a result. In 1970 Chambrun defended Greek shipping magnate Stavros Niarchos over false allegations that he killed his ex-wife, Eugenia Livanos. Additionally, Chambrun was hired by Somerset Maugham's daughter to prove that she was indeed his daughter.

Chambrun served as the chairman of Baccarat, the crystal manufacturer, from 1960 to 1992.

== Personal life and death ==
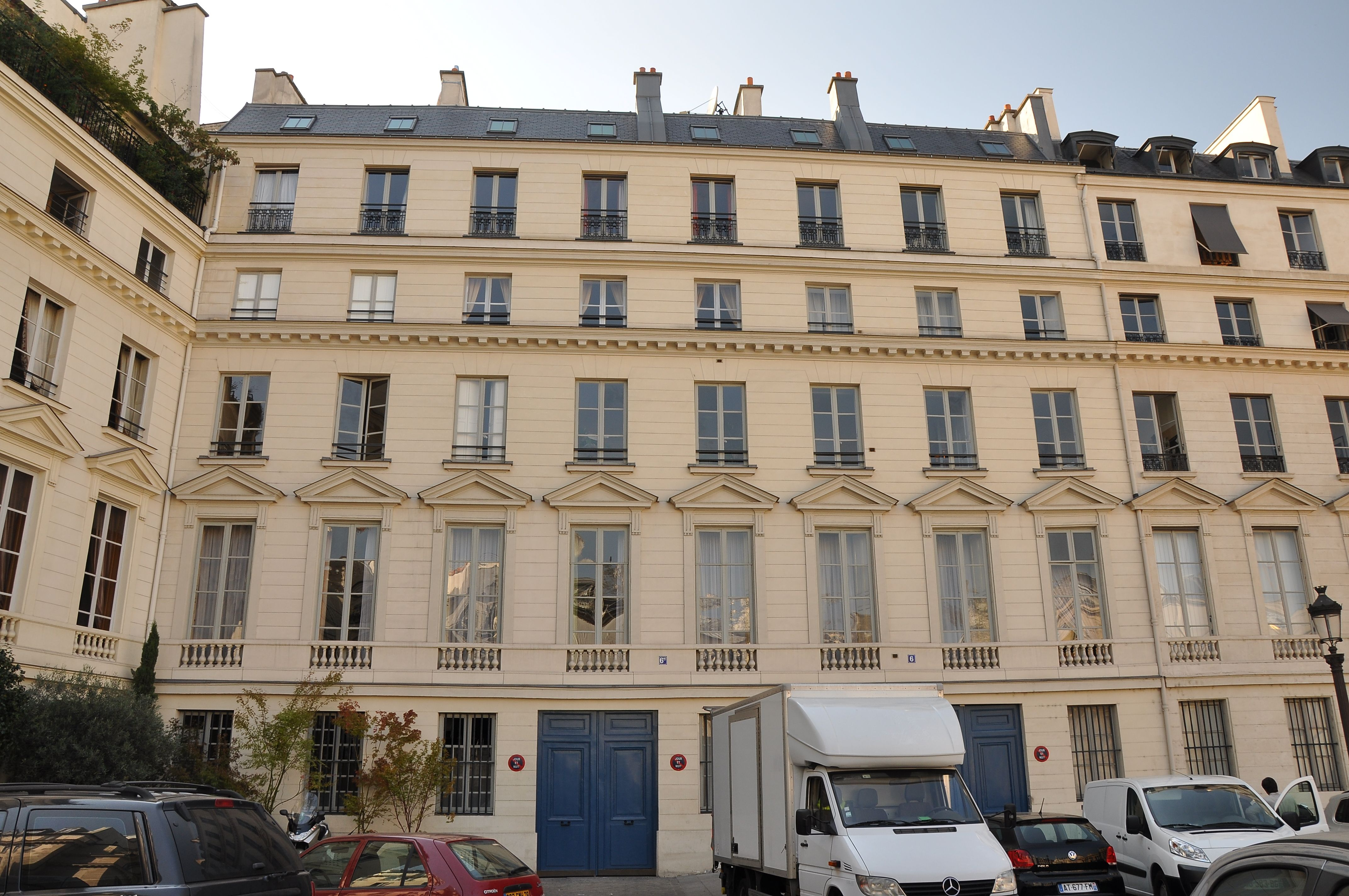
6 bis, Place du Palais-Bourbon

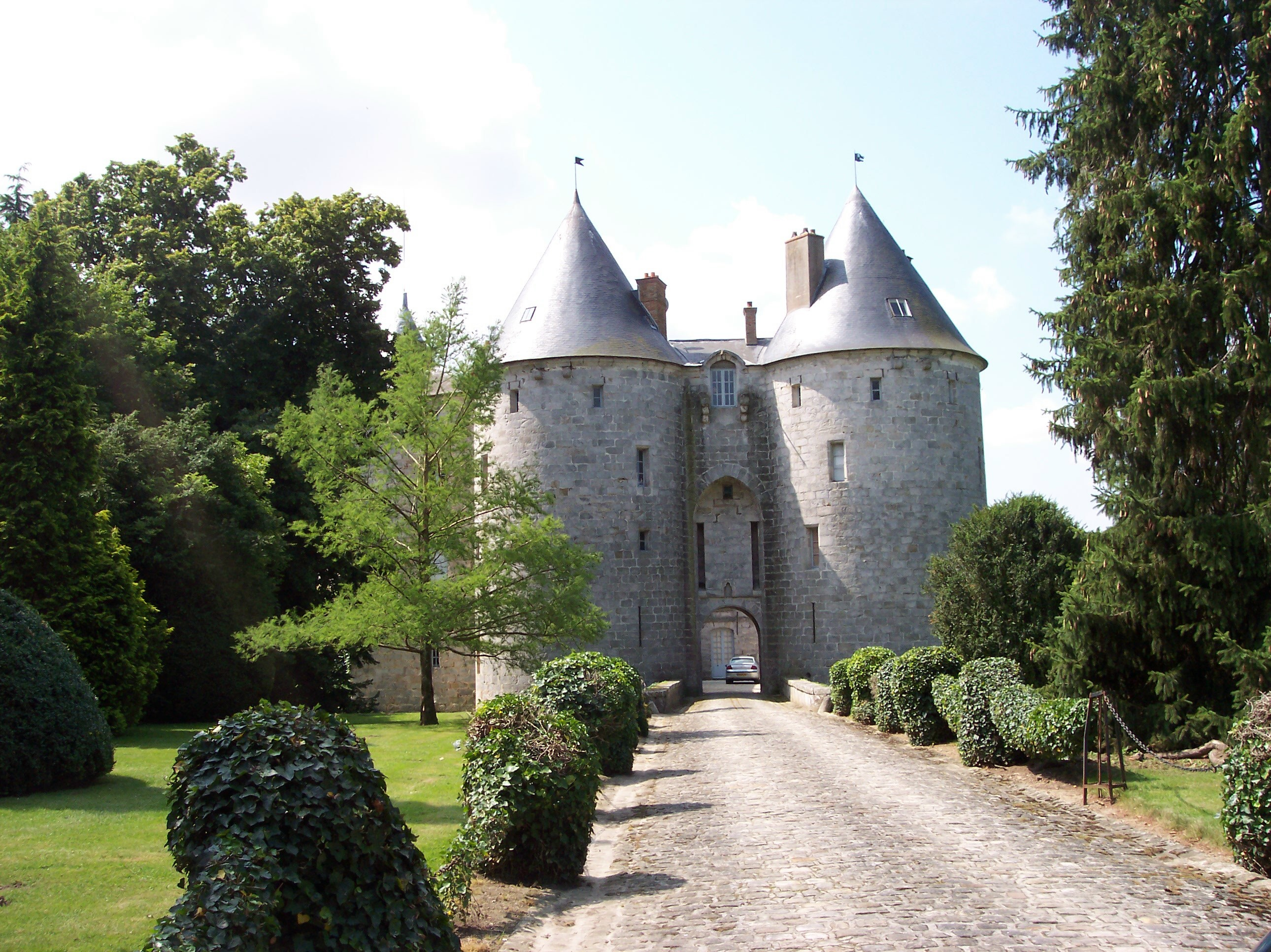
The Château de la Grange-Bléneau in 2008

Chambrun married Josée Laval (1911–1992), the only daughter of Pierre Laval in 1935. Their wedding was held at the town hall of the 7th arrondissement of Paris, followed by the Sainte-Clotilde the next day. They resided 6 bis, Place du Palais-Bourbon in the 7th arrondissement. In 1935, he bought the Château de la Grange-Bléneau, a castle in the commune of Courpalay in the Seine-et-Marne département of France, from his cousin, Louis de Lasteyrie, a descendant of La Fayette, with a life tenancy.

Upon Louis de Lasteyrie's death in 1955, Chambrun discovered the large cache of documents in the attic of the castle and founded a private museum about Lafayette. News of his discovery brought many historians to his door, but Chambrun denied access, except to André Maurois whom he authorized to write a biography of Adrienne de Lafayette. Chambrun produced a book by using the documents that he had discovered; they covered the period of 1792–1797, when Lafayette was in an Austrian prison. He organized and described the family archives, a collection dating from 1457 to 1990. The papers were microfilmed at La Grange in 1995 and 1996, for the Library of Congress. It took two years and several microfilm teams from the Library of Congress to film the 50,000 pages. There are now two major "Lafayette collections" in the world: one is at the Fondation de Chambrun; the other, originally assembled by Elie Fabius, at Cornell University Library. Chambrun purchased a sword used in battle by Lafayette in 1976, outbidding the Smithsonian Institution.

Chambrun served as the honorary president of the Sons of the American Revolution in France. He became a Chevalier (knight) of the Légion d'honneur.

Chambrun died on 19 May 2002 in Paris, France. His funeral, held at Sainte-Clotilde, was attended by Diana Mitford, the widow of British fascist leader Oswald Mosley. He was buried at the Montparnasse Cemetery.

== Works ==
- Chambrun, René de (1932). Les Emprunts sur titres et le marché de l'argent à New-York. Paris: Rousseau et Cie. OCLC 459185128.
- Chambrun, René de (1940). I saw France fall. Will she rise again?. New York: W. Morrow & Co. OCLC 395042.
- Chambrun, René de (1964). Baccarat's first two hundred years of history, 1764-1964. Paris: Corbeil-Essonnes. OCLC 35184101.
- Chambrun, Adolphe de; Corcelle, Marie Hélène Marthe de (1976). Chambrun, René de (ed.). Un Français chez les Lincoln : lettres inédites adressées pendant la guerre de Sécession. Paris: Librairie académique Perrin. ISBN 9782262000387. OCLC 3868356.
- Chambrun, René de (1977). Les prisons des La Fayette : dix ans de courage et d'amour. Paris: Perrin. ISBN 9782262000738. OCLC 3670435.
- Chambrun, René de (1980). Sorti du rang. Paris: Jullian. ISBN 9782863100301. OCLC 7552462.
- Chambrun, René de (1984). Pierre Laval : traitor or patriot?. New York: Scribner. ISBN 9780684180953. OCLC 11030312.
- Chambrun, René de (1986). France during the German occupation, 1940-1944 : summaries and important selections from statements on the government of Maréchal Pétain and Pierre Laval. A bibliographical supplement. Stanford, California: Hoover Institution Press. ISBN 9780817983727. OCLC 13821262.
- Chambrun, René de (1988). Les 2,600,000 otages français d'Hitler, 1940 : la France, puissance protectrice de ses prisonniers. Paris: Editions France-Empire. ISBN 9782704805983. OCLC 21762580.
- Chambrun, René de (1990). Mes combats pour Pierre Laval. Paris: Perrin. ISBN 9782262007614. OCLC 23059292.
- Chambrun, René de (1993). Mission and betrayal, 1940-1945 : working with Franklin Roosevelt to help save Britain and Europe. Stanford, California: Hoover Institution Press. ISBN 9780817992217. OCLC 26722920.
