= Judgment Day (disambiguation) =

Judgment Day is another name for the Last Judgment in the Abrahamic religions of Judaism, Christianity, and Islam.

Judgment Day or Judgement Day may also refer to:

== Arts, entertainment, and media ==
=== Film ===
- Judgement Day (1940 film), a 1940 German film
- Judgement Day (1949 film), a 1949 Czechoslovak comedy film
- Judgement Day (1988 film), a 1988 American horror film
- Judgment Day: The John List Story, a 1993 American made-for-television film
- Judgment Day (1999 film), a 1999 American direct-to-video science-fiction action film
- Judgment Day: The Ellie Nesler Story, a 1999 television film based on the life of Ellie Nesler
- Judgement Day (2013 film), a 2013 Singaporean comedy-drama disaster film
- Yomeddine, also known as Judgement Day, a 2018 Egyptian drama film
- Judgment Day (Terminator franchise), a date in the Terminator science fiction franchise
  - Terminator 2: Judgment Day, the second Terminator film released in 1991

=== Television ===
==== Episodes ====
- "Back to the Future IV: Judgment Day", Spin City season 3, episode 18 (1999)
- "D3: Judgement Day", 3rd Rock from the Sun season 4, episode 7 (1998)
- "Humboldt IV: Judgment Day", Murphy Brown season 7, episode 6 (1994)
- "Incident of Judgment Day", Rawhide season 5, episode 20 (1963)
- "J1: Judgment Day", Future Man season 2, episode 5 (2019)
- "Judgment Day" (3 Body Problem), season 1, episode 5 (2024)
- "Judgment Day", A Man in Full episode 6 (2024)
- "Judgment Day", Adventure Camp season 1, episode 12 (2003)
- "Judgment Day", Airline season 2, episode 1 (2004)
- "Judgment Day", Amish Mafia season 2, episode 7 (2013)
- "Judgment Day", Ax Men season 4, episode 6 (2011)
- "Judgment Day", Black Ink Crew season 1, episode 11 (2013)
- "Judgment Day", Blassreiter episode 12 (2008)
- "Judgment Day", Breaking Amish season 3, episode 7 (2013)
- "Judgment Day", Cameron's House Rules episode 5 (2015)
- "Judgment Day", Christy season 1, episode 6 (1994)
- "Judgment Day", Colt .45 season 1, episode 1 (1957)
- "Judgment Day", Cosby season 3, episode 9 (1998)
- "Judgment Day", Dallas (1978) season 13, episode 14 (1990)
- "Judgment Day", Deadliest Catch season 8, episode 9 (2013)
- "Judgment Day", Dinner: Impossible season 8, episode 12 (2010)
- "Judgment Day", Double Dragon season 1, episode 8 (1993)
- "Judgment Day", Edens Zero season 2, episode 23 (2023)
- "Judgment Day", Everest: Beyond the Limit season 2, episode 3 (2007)
- "Judgment Day", Face Off season 9, episode 9 (2015)
- "Judgment Day", Fear City: New York vs the Mafia episode 3 (2020)
- "Judgment Day", Ghost Hunters season 5, episode 13 (2009)
- "Judgment Day", Graveyard Carz season 7, episode 5 (2017)
- "Judgment Day", Grey's Anatomy season 14, episode 20 (2018)
- "Judgment Day", Hercules: The Legendary Journeys season 3, episode 15 (1997)
- "Judgment Day", Highlander: The Series season 4, episode 21 (1996)
- "Judgment Day", In the Heat of the Night season 6, episode 12 (1993)
- "Judgment Day", Killing Fields season 1, episode 6 (2016)
- "Judgment Day", King of the Nerds season 3, episode 1 (2015)
- "Judgment Day", Kings episode 6 (2099)
- "Judgment Day", Lonesome Dove: The Series season 1, episode 5 (1994)
- "Judgment Day", Missing season 2, episode 3 (2003)
- "Judgment Day", Mountain Men season 2, episode 14 (2013)
- "Judgment Day", NCIS season 5, episodes 18–19 (2008)
- "Judgment Day", Packed to the Rafters season 5, episode 5 (2012)
- "Judgment Day", Party of Five season 5, episode 19 (1999)
- "Judgment Day", Quantum Leap (2022) season 1, episode 18 (2023)
- "Judgment Day", Return to Amish season 3, episode 1 (2016)
- "Judgment Day", Saints & Sinners special (2021)
- "Judgment Day", Scorned: Love Kills season 1, episode 7 (2012)
- "Judgment Day", Silver Spoons season 4, episode 10 (1985)
- "Judgment Day" (Slow Horses), 2026
- "Judgment Day", Storm Chasers season 4, episode 8 (2010)
- "Judgment Day", Swamp Thing (1990) season 3, episode 22 (1992)
- "Judgment Day", Sword of Justice episode 7 (1978)
- "Judgment Day", The A-Team season 4, episodes 1–2 (1985)
- "Judgment Day", The Circus: Inside the Greatest Political Show on Earth season 3, episode 9 (2018)
- "Judgment Day", The Equalizer (2021) season 1, episode 3 (2021)
- "Judgment Day", The Making of the Mob: Chicago episode 5 (2016)
- "Judgment Day", The New Batman Adventures episode 24 (1998)
- "Judgment Day", The Outer Limits (1995) season 6, episode 1 (2000)
- "Judgment Day", The Paper Chase season 2, episode 15 (1984)
- "Judgment Day", Trapper John, M.D. season 7, episode 13 (1986)
- "Judgment Day", White Collar season 3, episode 16 (2012)
- "Judgement Day", 61st Street season 2, episode 8 (2023)
- "Judgement Day", 90 Day Fiancé season 7, episode 8 (2019)
- "Judgement Day", All Creatures Great and Small (1978) series 2, episode 5 (1978)
- "Judgement Day", All Saints season 2, episode 12 (1999)
- "Judgement Day", All Saints season 5, episode 25 (2002)
- "Judgement Day", All Saints season 9, episode 40 (2006)
- "Judgement Day", American Auto season 2, episode 13 (2023)
- "Judgement Day", American Chopper: Senior vs. Junior season 2, episode 3 (2011)
- "Judgement Day", Ash vs Evil Dead season 3, episode 9 (2018)
- "Judgement Day", Beverly Hills, 90210 season 7, episode 12 (1996)
- "JUDGEment Day", Beat Bobby Flay season 35, episode 6 (2024)
- "Judgement Day", Biker Battleground Phoenix episode 8 (2014)
- "Judgement Day", Blood of Zeus season 2, episode 5 (2024)
- "Judgement Day", Born and Bred series 1, episode 6 (2002)
- "Judgement Day", Casualty series 6, episode 2 (1991)
- "Judgement Day", Casualty series 17, episode 3 (2002)
- "Judgement Day", Crossing Jordan season 5, episode 4 (2005)
- "Judgement Day", Danger Man series 3, episode 7 (1965)
- "Judgement Day", Desmond's series 6, episode 8 (1994)
- "Judgement Day", Fame (1982) season 6, episode 4 (1986)
- "Judgement Day", Gold Rush season 2, episode 16 (2012)
- "Judgement Day", Gold Rush: White Water season 7, episode 9 (2023)
- "Judgement Day", G.P. season 3, episode 38 (1991)
- "Judgement Day", Heartbeat series 15, episode 16 (2006)
- "Judgement Day", Hey Joel episode 1 (2003)
- "Judgement Day", Ice Road Truckers season 5, episode 15 (2011)
- "Judgement Day", Jamie Johnson series 3, episode 9 (2018)
- "Judgement Day", Johnny Ringo episode 28 (1960)
- "Judgement Day", Kaafir episode 4 (2019)
- "Judgement Day", Lucha Underground season 2, episode 19 (2016)
- "Judgement Day", Maybe This Time episode 11 (1995)
- "Judgement Day", Midsomer Murders series 3, episode 3 (2000)
- "Judgement Day (Part One)" and "Judgement Day (Part Two)", Murder Prevention episodes 5–6 (2004)
- "Judgement Day", Nick Freno: Licensed Teacher season 1, episode 7 (1996)
- "Judgement Day", North Woods Law season 5, episode 2 (2015)
- "Judgement Day", Pointman season 1, episode 10 (1995)
- "Judgement Day", Police Rescue season 2, episode 5 (1992)
- "Judgement Day", Republic of Doyle season 6, episode 9 (2014)
- "Judgement Day", Sisters season 5, episode 19 (1995)
- "Judgement Day", Taggart series 24, episode 2 (2008)
- "Judgement Day", Taskmaster New Zealand series 2, episode 8 (2021)
- "Judgement Day", Teen Mom 2 season 1, episode 12 (2011)
- "Judgement Day", The Bill series 15, episode 83 (1999)
- "Judgement Day", The Bill series 25, episode 44; part six of Conviction (2009)
- "Judgement Day" The Commish season 1, episode 19 (1992)
- "Judgement Day", The Flying House episode 22 (1982)
- "Judgement Day", The Office (1995) episode 5 (1995)
- "Judgement Day", The Real Housewives of New Jersey season 6, episode 14 (2014)
- "Judgement Day", The Streets of San Francisco season 4, episode 19 (1976)
- "Judgement Day", The Young Riders season 2, episode 12 (1991)
- "Judgement Day", Third Watch season 3, episodes 5–6 (2002)
- "Judgement Day", Vanderpump Rules season 3, episode 14 (2015)
- "Judgement Day", Without Motive series 2, episode 1 (2001)
- "The Judgement Day", Kana Kaanum Kaalangal (2022) season 1, episode 93 (2022)
- "The Judgement Day", Undercover Billionaire season 2, episode 14 (2021)

==== Shows ====
- WWE Judgment Day, an annual pay-per-view event held by World Wrestling Entertainment from 1998 to 2009
- Reviews on the Run, a Canadian video game review show formerly known as Judgment Day in the U.S., which began airing in 2002
- Judgement Day (TV series), a short-lived UK game show, which aired in 2003
- Judgment Day: Intelligent Design on Trial, a 2007 Nova documentary on intelligent design

=== Literature ===
- Judgement Day (comics), a number of comic book series or stories
- Judgment Day, a 1928 novel by Norman Davey
- Judgment Day, a 1934 play by Elmer Rice
- Judgment Day (novel), a 1935 novel by James T. Farrell, the conclusion to his Studs Lonigan trilogy
- "Judgment Day" (short story), a 1955 science fiction story by L. Sprague de Camp
- "Judgement Day" (short story), a 1965 Southern Gothic story by Flannery O'Connor
- Judgment Day, a 1974 novel by Warren Murphy and Richard Sapir; the fourteenth installment in The Destroyer novel series
- Judgment Day, a 1975 novel by Ralph Hayes
- Judgement Day, a 1978 novel by Angus Wells under the pen name J. B. Dancer; the third installment in The Lawmen series
- Judgment Day, a 1980 novel by Penelope Lively
- Judgment Day: My Years with Ayn Rand, a 1989 memoir by Nathaniel Branden
- Judgment Day, a 1996 novel by James Reasoner; the sixth installment in the Wind River series
- Judgment Day, a 1999 novel by Jane Jensen (originally titled Millennium Rising)
- Judgment Day, a 2001 novel by Jerry B. Jenkins and Tim LaHaye; the 14th installment in the Left Behind: The Kids series
- Judgment Day, a 2001 novel by Michael Newton; the 270th installment in The Executioner book series, book three of the Conspiracy Trilogy
- Judgment Day, a 2014 novel by Joseph Nassise
- Judgment Day (Ulin play), a 2024 play by Rob Ulin

=== Music ===
- Der Tag des Gerichts (1762), oratorio by Telemann
- Judgement Day (band), American String Metal band

==== Albums ====
- Judgement Day (Esham album), 1992
- Judgement Day (Lovebites album), 2023
- Judgement Day, a 2000 album by Balzac (band)
- Judgement Day, a 1993 album by Pooh-Man
- Judgement Day, a 1997 album by Sinner (band)
- Judgement Days, a 2005 album by Ms. Dynamite
- Tical 2000: Judgement Day, a 1998 album by Method Man
- Judgment Day (album), a pair of albums by the Rashied Ali Quintet

==== Songs ====
- Judgement Day (Laurel Aitken song), 1960 single
- Judgement Day (Method Man song), a 1998 song by Method Man
- "Judgement Day" (Ms. Dynamite song), a 2005 song by Ms. Dynamite
- "Judgement Day", a 1989 song by Whitesnake
- "Judgement Day", a 1991 song by Integrity
- "Judgement Day", a 1991 song by Van Halen
- "Judgment Day", a song in the 1997 video game Final Fantasy VII
- "Judgement Day", a 2008 song by Dokken
- "The Judgement Day", a 2014 song by Galneryus from Vetelgyus
- "Judgement Day", a 2017 song by DragonForce from Reaching into Infinity
- "Judgement Day", a 2019 song by Iron Fire from Beyond the Void
- "Judgement Day", a 2022 song by Five Finger Death Punch from AfterLife
- "Judgement Day", a 2023 song by Lovebites from Judgement Day
- "Judgement Day", a 2025 song by Architects from The Sky, the Earth & All Between

=== Other ===
- Judgement Day (Judge Dredd: The Role-Playing Game), a 1986 role-playing game adventure

== Sports ==
- Judgement Day (rugby union), an annual Welsh rugby union event
- WWE Judgment Day, a professional wrestling pay-per-view event
- The Judgment Day, a professional wrestling stable
- Jake Paul vs. Anthony Joshua, billed as "Judgment Day"

== See also ==
- Judge Day (disambiguation)
- Judgment (disambiguation)
