= Justice Day (disambiguation) =

Justice Day refers to William R. Day (1849–1923), associate justice of the Supreme Court of the United States. Justice Day may also refer to:

- Arthur H. Day (1890–1967), associate justice of the Ohio Supreme Court
- Edward C. Day Jr. (1908–1999), associate justice of the Colorado Supreme Court
- George A. Day (1859–1927), associate justice of the Nebraska Supreme Court
- James G. Day (1835–1898), associate justice of the Iowa Supreme Court
- John Day (judge) (1797–1859), 2nd Chief Justice of Liberia
- L. B. Day (judge) (1889–1938), associate justice of the Nebraska Supreme Court
- Luther Day (1813–1885), associate justice of the Ohio Supreme Court
- Robert Day (Irish politician, born 1746) (1746–1841), justice of the Court of King's Bench of Ireland
- Robert H. Day (judge) (1867–1933), associate justice of the Ohio Supreme Court
- Roland B. Day (1919–2008), chief justice of the Wisconsin Supreme Court
- "Justice Day", a 2023 song by @onefive from Classy Crush

== See also ==
- Sandra Day O'Connor (born Sandra Day, 1930), associate justice of the Supreme Court of the United States
- World Day of Social Justice
- World Day for International Justice
- Judge Day (disambiguation)
