= Judgment (disambiguation) =

A judgment or judgement is a balanced evaluation of evidence to form a decision or opinion.

Judgment or judgement may also refer to:

- Judgment (mathematical logic)
- Judgment (law), a formal decision made by a court following a lawsuit
- Value judgment, a determination of something's worth or goodness, based upon a particular set of values or point of view
- A label in labeled data

== Cards and games ==
- Judgement (Tarot card), a Major Arcana card in the tarot
- Judgment (Magic: The Gathering), an expansion to the Magic: The Gathering collectible card game
- Judgment (video game), a video game set in the Yakuza universe
- Judgment: Apocalypse Survival Simulation, a 2018 video game set during the Apocalypse
- Judgment, a character in the Guilty Gear fighting game series
- Judgement, a character in the Battle Arena Toshinden fighting game series

== Law ==
- Confession of judgment, a clause in a contract in which one party waives defenses against the other party
- Consent judgment, a final, binding judgment in a case in which both parties agree, by stipulation, to a particular outcome
- Declaratory judgment, a judgment of a court in a civil case which declares the rights, duties, or obligations of each party in a dispute
- Default judgment, a binding judgment in favor of the plaintiff when the defendant has not responded to a summons
- Summary judgment, a legal term which means that a court has made a determination without a full trial
- Vacated judgment, the result of the judgment of an appellate court which overturns, reverses, or sets aside the judgment of a lower court

== Literature ==
- "The Judgment", a 1912 short story by Franz Kafka

== Religion ==
- Judgement (afterlife), in religion a judgment after death, weighing the deeds in life
- Divine judgment, the judgment of God
- General judgment, the Christian theological concept of a judgment of the souls of the dead by nation and as a whole
- Investigative judgment, a unique Seventh-day Adventist doctrine
- Last Judgment, the ethical-judicial trial, judgment, and punishment/reward of all individual humans by a divine tribunal at the end of time
- Particular judgment, a doctrine in Christian eschatology
- Pre-advent judgment, a belief that the final judgment will occur before the Second Coming of Jesus

== Film ==
- Ai-Fak or The Judgment, a 2004 Thai film
- Judgment (1990 film), a film directed by Tom Topor
- Judgement (1992 film), a feature film, directed by William Sachs
- Judgement (1999 film), a short film by South Korean film director Park Chan-wook
- Apocalypse IV: Judgment, a 2001 film released by Cloud Ten Pictures, and is the third sequel to the 1998 film Apocalypse
- The Judgment (2014 film), a Bulgarian film
- Judgement (2019 film), a Marathi-language Indian film; see Tejashri Pradhan
- The Judgement (2020 film), a Dutch film
- The Judgement (2024 film), an Indian Kannada-language legal thriller film

== Television episodes ==
- "The Judgment", the 1967 two-part final episode of The Fugitive
- "Judgment" (Angel), 2000
- "Judgment" (Person of Interest), 2011
- "Judgment" (Star Trek: Enterprise), 2003
- "Judgement" (The Office), 2001

== Music ==
- Judgement (Anathema album), 1999
- Judgement (VNV Nation album), 2007
- Judgment!, by Andrew Hill, 1964
- "The Judgment", a song by Solomon Burke from the 2002 album Don't Give Up on Me
- "Judgement", a song by Iron & Wine from the 2015 album Archive Series Volume No. 1

== See also ==
- Final Judgment (disambiguation)
- Judgement Rocks
- Judgment Day (disambiguation)
- Judgment Night (disambiguation)

__EXPECTSHORTPAGE__
