= Judge Day =

Judge Day may refer to:

- Charles Bernard Day (born 1957), magistrate judge of the United States District Court for the District of Maryland
- Edward William Day (1901–1985), judge of the United States District Court for the District of Rhode Island
- John Charles Day (1826–1908), judge of the High Court of Justice of England
- Thomas Day (Connecticut judge) (1777–1855), judge of the county and city courts of Hartford
- William Louis Day (1876–1936), judge of the United States District Court for the Northern District of Ohio
- William R. Day (1849–1923), judge of the United States Court of Appeals for the Sixth Circuit before being elevated to the Supreme Court of the United States

== See also ==
- Justice Day (disambiguation)
- Judgment Day (disambiguation)
