= W. F. Garver =

American judge

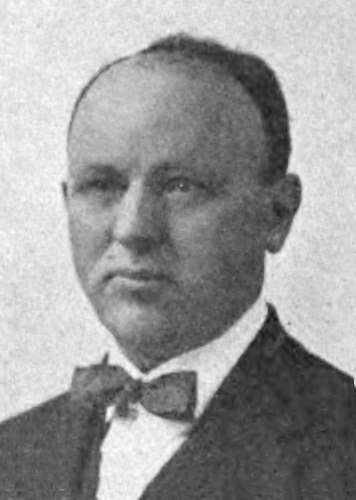

Associate Justice of the Ohio Supreme Court
- In office November 1934 – December 1934
- Preceded by: Charles B. Zimmerman
- Succeeded by: Charles B. Zimmerman

Member of the Ohio House of Representatives from the Holmes County district
- In office January 4, 1915 – January 5, 1919
- Preceded by: M. A. Warnes
- Succeeded by: Albert Hastings

Member of the Ohio Senate from the 17th and 28th district
- In office January 1, 1923 – January 2, 1927
- Preceded by: L. D. Cornell
- Succeeded by: Alton H. Etling

Personal details
- Born: September 17, 1864 Holmes County, Ohio
- Died: January 29, 1942 (aged 77) Somerset, Kentucky
- Resting place: Oak Hill Cemetery, Millersburg, Ohio
- Party: Democratic
- Spouse(s): Florence Patterson; Lulu McCulloch
- Children: one
- Education: Ohio Northern University; Ohio State University College of Law

William Frederick (W.F.) Garver was a judge from the U.S. State of Ohio who sat on the Ohio District Courts of Appeals and the Ohio Supreme Court during the 1930s.

== Biography ==
W.F. Garver was born on a farm outside of Killbuck, Holmes County, Ohio, on September 17, 1864. He attended the local schools, and began teaching at age fifteen. He graduated from Ohio Northern University in 1883, and taught for the next ten years. He entered the Ohio State University College of Law in 1893, and was admitted to the bar in 1896. He opened a law office in Millersburg, Ohio, and was admitted to practice before the Supreme Court of the United States in 1898.

== Political career ==
Garver was elected Holmes County prosecuting attorney in 1896, and was re-elected in 1899. He did not run for a third term in 1902. He was elected to the Ohio House of Representatives in 1914 and 1916 from the Holmes County district. He was elected to the Ohio State Senate in 1922, and re-elected in 1924. While the Senate had 27 Republicans and four Democrats, Garver, a Democrat, was elected president pro tempore. He also served as a Millersburg city councilman, and county school examiner.

In 1927, Garver returned to his law practice in Millersburg, until he was elected to an unexpired term in the 5th District Court of Appeals, serving from December 1930 to January 1933. On September 29, 1933, Justice Robert H. Day of the Ohio Supreme Court died, and Governor George White appointed Charles B. Zimmerman until a successor would be elected in November 1934. In November, 1934, elections were held for the remaining six weeks of Day's term, and the new term beginning January 1, 1935. Zimmerman chose to run for the full term, but not the short term. Garver won election for the short term, and served as a justice from November to December 31, 1934.

Garver returned to Millersburg in 1935, where he partnered with his grandson in a law firm.

Garver was married to Florence Patterson in 1889, and they had one daughter before Florence died in 1892. Garver married Lulu McCulloch in 1897. Garver died January 29, 1942, in Somerset, Kentucky, from a heart attack while on a trip to Florida for a vacation. He is buried at Oak Hill Cemetery in Millersburg.

W. F. Garver was a member of the fraternal orders of Masons, Knights of Pythias, and the I.O.O.F.
