= William Gilmore =

William Gilmore may refer to:

- William Gilmore (rower) (1895–1969), American rower
- William H. Gilmore (1839–1910), Vermont political and military figure
- William J. Gilmore (1821–1896), American jurist in Ohio
- William S. Gilmore, American producer of Defiance (1980 film)
