= Stephen A. Day =

American politician (1882–1950)

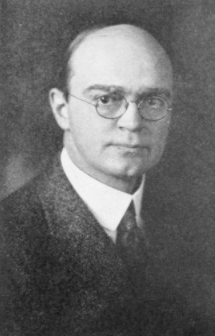

Member of the U.S. House of Representatives from Illinois's at-large district
- In office January 3, 1941 – January 3, 1945
- Preceded by: John C. Martin
- Succeeded by: Emily Taft Douglas

Personal details
- Born: Stephen Albion Day; July 13, 1882 Canton, Ohio, U.S.
- Died: January 5, 1950 (aged 67) Evanston, Illinois, U.S.
- Resting place: Memorial Park; Skokie, Illinois, U.S.
- Party: Republican
- Parent: William R. Day (father)
- Relatives: William Louis Day (brother); Zephaniah Swift Spalding (great-uncle); Robert H. Day (half-uncle); Luther Day (paternal grandfather)
- Occupation: Politician; lawyer

Stephen Albion Day (July 13, 1882 – January 5, 1950) was a U.S. representative from Illinois.

== Biography ==
Day was born in Canton, Ohio, the son of Mary Elizabeth (née Schaefer) and William R. Day, a justice of the Supreme Court of the United States. Day attended the public schools at Canton, the University School at Cleveland, Ohio, and Asheville School in North Carolina. He graduated from the University of Michigan at Ann Arbor in 1905, and subsequently served as secretary to Chief Justice Melville W. Fuller of the Supreme Court of the United States from 1905 to 1907.

He studied law at the University of Michigan Law School. He was admitted to the bar in 1907 and commenced practice in Cleveland. He moved to Evanston, Illinois, in 1908 and continued the practice of law in Chicago. He served as special counsel to the Comptroller of the Currency from 1926 to 1928.

Day was elected as a Republican to the Seventy-seventh and Seventy-eighth Congresses (January 3, 1941 – January 3, 1945). He was an unsuccessful candidate for re-election in 1944 to the Seventy-ninth Congress. During his term, Day opposed U.S. involvement in World War II, claiming it would entail "national suicide" and "economic slavery". His reputation suffered when his name was linked to Nazi agent George Sylvester Viereck. Day published a book, We Must Save the Republic, through Flanders Hall, a small company with ties to registered Nazi agents. In an investigation of Viereck's links to Congress, Day was named as one of four federal politicians who had knowingly collaborated with Viereck.

Day resumed the practice of law in Evanston, where he died on January 5, 1950.

== See also ==
- List of law clerks for the chief justice of the United States
- List of law clerks for the tenth seat of the Supreme Court of the United States

U.S. House of Representatives
Preceded by John C. Martin	Member of the U.S. House of Representatives from Illinois's at-large congressional district 1941–1945	Succeeded by Emily Taft Douglas
