= William B. Crew =

American judge

William Binford Crew
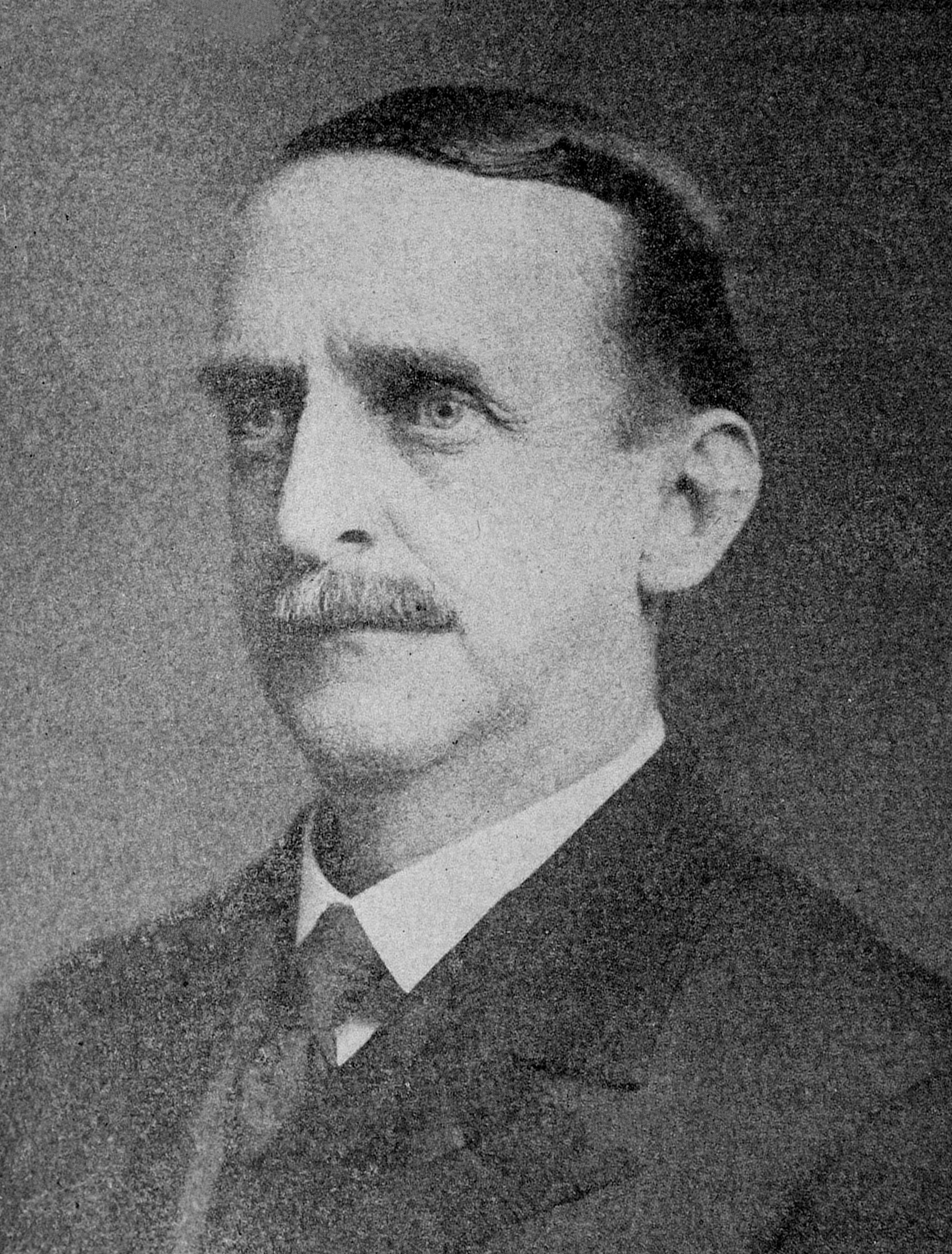

Justice of the Ohio Supreme Court
- In office July 19, 1902 – January 1, 1911
- Appointed by: George K. Nash
- Preceded by: Marshall Jay Williams
- Succeeded by: James G. Johnson

Personal details
- Born: April 1, 1852 Chesterhill, Ohio
- Died: January 25, 1911 (aged 58) Marietta, Ohio
- Resting place: McConnelsville, Ohio
- Party: Republican
- Spouse: Elizabeth P. Worrall
- Children: two

William Binford Crew (April 1, 1852 – January 25, 1911) was a Republican politician in the U.S. State of Ohio who was in the Ohio House of Representatives, and a judge on the Ohio Supreme Court 1902–1911.

William B. Crew was born at Chesterhill, Morgan County, Ohio, and educated in the public schools and at Westtown College in Pennsylvania, (a college under management of the Society of Friends). He was admitted to the bar of Ohio in 1873.

Crew graduated from the Ohio State and Union Law College, Cleveland, Ohio, in 1874, and was elected Prosecuting Attorney of Morgan County in 1876. He was elected to represent his county in the Ohio House of Representatives in 1889, serving in the 79th General Assembly, 1890–1891.

Crew was elected a judge of the Court of Common Pleas for the 1st Subdivision of the 8th judicial district of Ohio in 1891, and re-elected in 1896 and 1901. At the Republican State Convention in May 1902, he was Nominated for Judge of the Supreme Court. Governor Nash appointed Crew to fill the vacancy on the court caused by the death of Marshall Jay Williams, effective July 19, 1902. He was elected to a term in November 1902, and served as judge until January 1, 1911.

Judge Crew died January 25, 1912, at a hotel in Marietta, Ohio. He is buried in McConnelsville, Ohio.

In 1876, Crew married Elizabeth P. Worrall of Morgan County. They had two children.

Legal offices
Preceded by Marshall Jay Williams	Ohio Supreme Court Judges; 1902–1911	Succeeded by James G. Johnson
Ohio House of Representatives
Preceded by Leroy S. Holcomb	Representative from Morgan County; 1890–1891	Succeeded by Charles H. Dunn
