= William J. Gilmore =

American judge

William James Gilmore
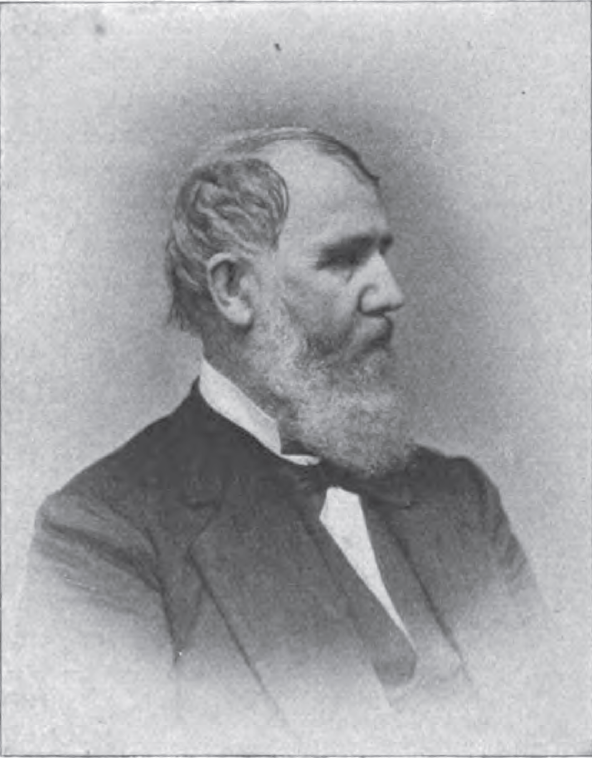

Justice of the Ohio Supreme Court
- In office February 9, 1875 – February 9, 1880
- Preceded by: Luther Day
- Succeeded by: William Wartenbee Johnson

6th President of the Ohio State Bar Association
- In office December 30, 1885 – December 29, 1886
- Preceded by: Asa W. Jones
- Succeeded by: John A. McMahon

Personal details
- Born: April 24, 1821 Bedford County, Virginia
- Died: August 9, 1896 (aged 75) Columbus, Ohio
- Resting place: Mound Hill Cemetery, Eaton, Ohio
- Party: Democratic
- Spouse: Sarah Ann Rossman
- Children: two
- Education: Hopewell Academy

William James Gilmore (April 24, 1821 – August 9, 1896) was a Democratic jurist in the U.S. State of Ohio who was a justice of the Supreme Court of Ohio from 1875 to 1880.

Gilmore was born in Bedford County, Virginia, son of Dr. Eli Gilmore and Clarissa Mosby Clayton, sister of a prominent Mississippi judge, later a member of the Confederate Congress, Alexander Mosby Clayton. The family moved to Israel Township, Preble County, Ohio in 1825, where the father became a prominent physician. Here William was educated at a log schoolhouse, at Hopewell Academy, and at Westfield Academy.

He began study of law in 1844 in the office of Thomas Millikin in Hamilton, Ohio, and continued with J.S. and A. J. Hawkins in Eaton, Ohio. He supported himself with school teaching, farm labor and clerking. He was admitted to the bar on December 8, 1847, and he worked and lived in Eaton.

Gilmore was Prosecuting Attorney of Preble County for two terms, and was elected to the Common Pleas bench in 1857. He was successively re-elected, and served until 1874. He was appointed a trustee of Miami University in 1871, and was a trustee of the Ohio Archaeological and Historical Society.

In 1874, Gilmore was selected at the state Democratic Party convention to run for a seat on the Ohio Supreme Court, and later that year defeated Republican incumbent Luther Day for a five-year term. He was seated February 1875 and was defeated in the 1879 election by Republican William Wartenbee Johnson.

In 1880, after his term expired, Gilmore entered private practice in Columbus, Ohio. He was elected president of the Ohio State Bar Association in 1885, and was delegate to the American Bar Association in 1894. He died in Columbus on August 9, 1896.

He is buried with his wife at Mound Hill Cemetery in Eaton. Gilmore married Sarah Ann Rossman on September 7, 1848. They had two sons. Sarah died on April 29, 1885.

== See also ==
- List of justices of the Ohio Supreme Court
