= James G. Johnson =

American judge (1855–1936)

James Granville Johnson Jr.
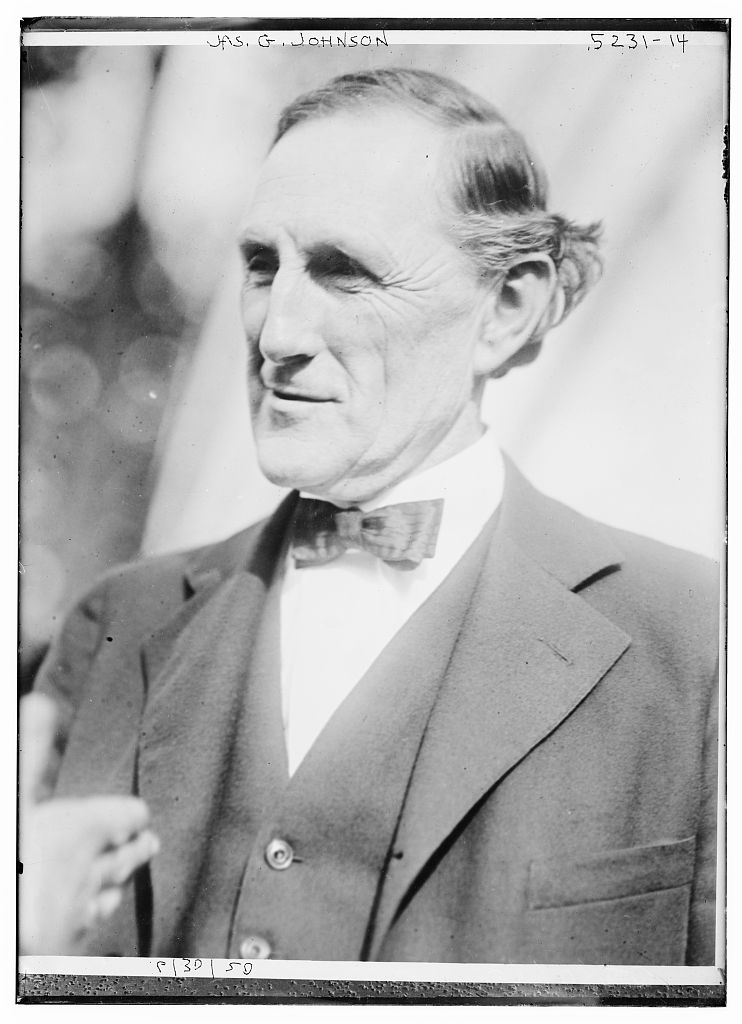
- Johnson circa 1922

Ohio Supreme Court Associate Justice
- In office January 1, 1911 – August 3, 1922
- Preceded by: William B. Crew
- Succeeded by: George H. Clark

Mayor of Springfield, Ohio
- In office 1893–1894

Personal details
- Born: December 3, 1855 Springfield, Ohio, U.S.
- Died: October 24, 1936 (aged 80) Springfield, Ohio, U.S.
- Resting place: Ferncliff Cemetery, Springfield
- Party: Democratic
- Spouse: Blanche Oberchain (m. 1888)
- Children: three
- Education: Wittenberg College; Cincinnati Law School

James Granville Johnson Jr. (December 3, 1855 – October 24, 1936) was a Democratic lawyer who was Mayor of Springfield, Ohio, and a justice of the Ohio Supreme Court.

== Biography ==
Johnson was born December 3, 1855, in Springfield, Ohio, to James Granville Johnson Sr. and Catherine Eby Johnson. He was educated at public schools, and graduated from Wittenberg College in 1876. He read law at a local office, and was the first court stenographer of Clark County. He graduated from Cincinnati Law School, and was admitted to the bar in 1880.

From 1880 to 1897, Johnson practiced law in Springfield with a local judge. Johnson ran as a Democrat for Ohio House of Representatives in 1881, Clark County prosecuting attorney and District Court judge in 1886, losing each time in Republican leaning Clark County. Johnson married Blanche Oberchain, December 4, 1888. They raised three children.

He was Mayor of Springfield, Ohio, from 1893 to 1894.

In 1910, Johnson ran for the Ohio Supreme Court. He won, and assumed his seat January 1, 1911. In 1916, he received a doctor of laws from Wittenberg University, and won re-election in November. In 1922, Johnson sought the Democratic nomination for Ohio Governor. He resigned from the court August 3, 1922, to campaign. He lost the primary election to A. Victor Donahey.

After the election, Johnson returned to Springfield, and resumed his law practice. In 1930, he retired after suffering a breakdown.

Johnson died after a long illness October 24, 1936, in Springfield, Ohio. A Lutheran pastor conducted the funeral services before burial in Ferncliff Cemetery.

== See also ==
- List of mayors of Springfield, Ohio
