= George H. Clark =

American judge

Justice of the Ohio Supreme Court
- In office August 7, 1922 – December 31, 1922
- Appointed by: Harry L. Davis
- Preceded by: James G. Johnson
- Succeeded by: Robert H. Day

Personal details
- Born: October 18, 1872 Canton, Ohio, U.S.
- Died: July 11, 1943 (aged 70) Waynesburg, Ohio, U.S.
- Resting place: West Lawn Cemetery
- Party: Republican
- Spouse: Harriet C. Crum
- Children: two
- Education: Cincinnati Law School

George H. Clark (October 18, 1872 – July 11, 1943) was a Republican lawyer from Canton, Ohio in the United States who sat as a judge on the Ohio Supreme Court in 1922.

== Early life ==
Clark was born on October 18, 1872 in Canton, Ohio. His parents were James J. and Ada Schlabach Clark. He graduated from Cincinnati Law School in 1894, and was admitted to the bar of Ohio in 1895, and later to the US District and Court of Appeals bar.

== Career ==
Clark joined Clark, Ambler & Clark in 1895, which became Clark & Clark in 1900. In 1915 he partnered with H. E. Hunker. Beginning in 1917, Clark managed the Selective Service Board for the northern district of Stark County during World War I.

In 1919, Clark became head of the State Republican Advisory Committee, and the Ohio Republican State Executive Committee in 1920. He was successful, as Warren G. Harding won Ohio, and the party carried the statewide races and the legislature.

On August 3, 1922, James G. Johnson resigned from the Ohio Supreme Court to run for the Democratic primary for Ohio Governor. On August 7, 1922, Governor Harry L. Davis named Clark to the vacancy. He had to run in November for the final two months of the term, and was unopposed in the write-in election. His term ended December 31 of that year.

In January, 1923, Clark returned to Canton and his practice. He lost interest in law and politics after his partner died in 1925, and retired to his farm near Waynesburg, Stark County.

== Personal life ==
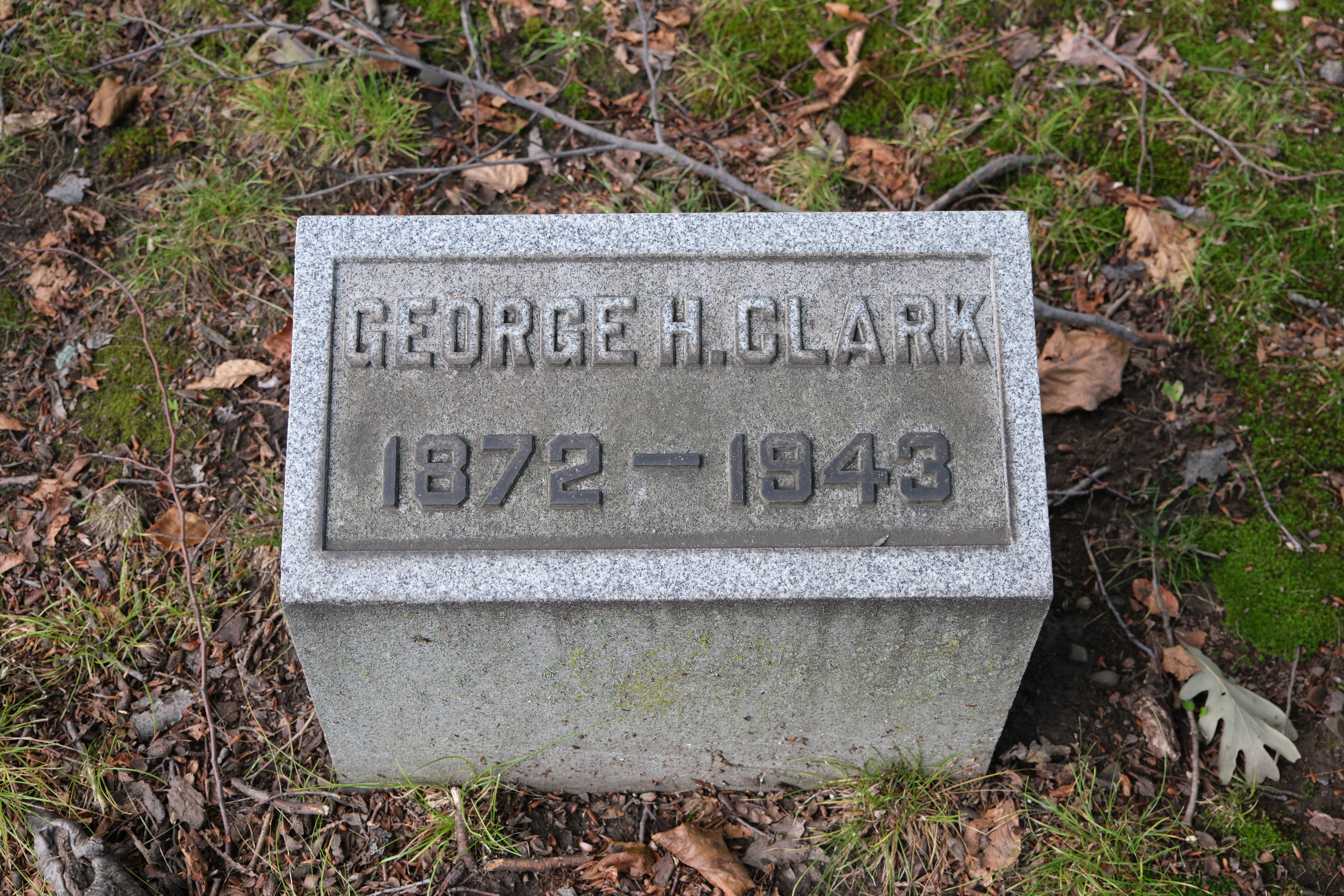
Grave of Clark in West Lawn Cemetery

Clark married Harriet C. Crum of Canton August 15, 1900. They had two sons, John J. and Thomas C.

Clark was a presidential elector in the 1924 presidential election. He died on July 11, 1943, in Waynesburg, Ohio. He is buried in West Lawn Cemetery, Canton, Ohio.

Legal offices
Preceded by James G. Johnson	Ohio Supreme Court Justice; 1922/8/7-1922/12/31	Succeeded by Robert H. Day
