= Ohio State and Union Law College =

Law school in Cleveland, Ohio

Coordinates: 41.4995°N 81.6949°W

The Ohio State and Union Law College, was an independent law school in Cleveland, Ohio that operated from 1855 to 1876.

== Founding ==
The college was founded in 1855 in Poland, Ohio, by the law firm of Judge Chester Hayden, Marcus King, and MD Legett as the Poland Law College. In 1856 or 1857 it moved to Cleveland and was incorporated under its official name.

Hayden served as dean, with 2 full-time instructors until 1863, when he sold the school to John Crowell, a Cleveland lawyer who became president of the College 1n 1862. The College closed when Crowell retired in 1876.

The College had about 500 students while it operated and awarded about 200 LL.B. degrees. At the start, the course only lasted one year, but this was extended to two years around 1870. In 1871 the College had 2 professors, 28 students, and a library of 2,500 volumes.

== Approach ==
According to its 1872-73 prospectus, the college aimed to given the student a thorough practical as well as a theoretical legal education. It did this by focusing on practical exercises such as the preparation of legal questions and motions for argument, weekly debates, and trials of causes, in addition to lectures. The prospectus expected that the students attending the course would get as much actual practice in all parts of the profession than lawyers generally have during their first ten year of practice.

== Notable alumni ==
- William Wellington Corlett, U.S. House of Representatives delegate from Wyoming Territory, graduated in 1866
- William B. Crew, judge of the Ohio Supreme Court
- John Patterson Green, prominent African American attorney, graduated in 1870
- John W. Rowell, Chief justice of the Vermont Supreme Court
