= Marshall Jay Williams =

American judge

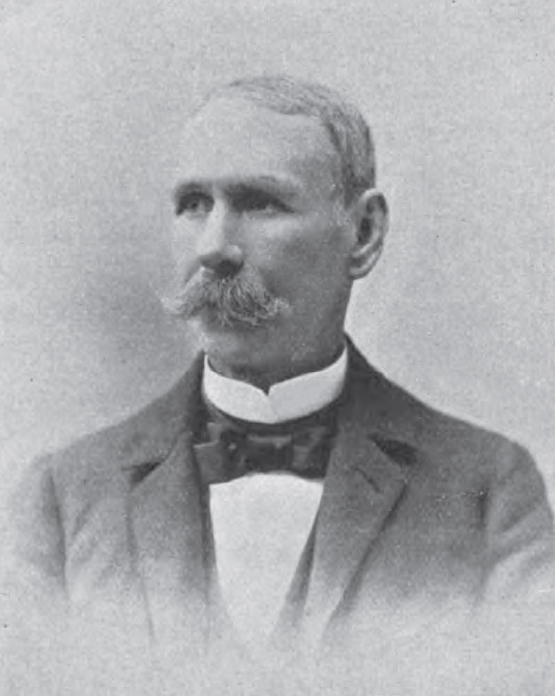

Justice of the Ohio Supreme Court
- In office February 9, 1887 – July 7, 1902
- Preceded by: Martin Dewey Follett
- Succeeded by: William B. Crew

1st Dean of Moritz College of Law
- In office 1891–1893
- Succeeded by: William F. Hunter

Personal details
- Born: February 22, 1837 Fayette County, Ohio
- Died: July 7, 1902 (aged 65) Columbus, Ohio
- Resting place: Washington Cemetery, Fayette County
- Party: Republican
- Spouse: Bertha Williams
- Children: one
- Education: Ohio Wesleyan University

Marshall J. Williams (February 22, 1837 – July 7, 1902) was a Republican politician in the U.S. State of Ohio who was in the Ohio House of Representatives and was a judge on the Ohio Supreme Court 1887–1902.

Marshall J. Williams was born on a farm in Fayette County, Ohio, and educated at the common schools of Washington Court House, Ohio, and for two years at Ohio Wesleyan University. In 1855 he began study of law, was admitted to the bar in 1857, and opened an office in Washington Court House. In 1859 he was elected Prosecuting Attorney of Fayette County, and served two terms.

Williams was elected in 1869 and again in 1871 to represent Fayette County in the Ohio House of Representatives.

In 1884, Williams was chosen Judge of the Circuit Court for the Second State Circuit. In 1886, he was nominated by the Republicans for Supreme Court Judge, and defeated incumbent Democrat Martin Dewey Follett. He was re-elected in 1891, and 1896, and served until July 7, 1902, when he died at Columbus. His cause of death was diabetes, and burial was at Washington Cemetery in Fayette County.

Williams served as the first dean of the Ohio State University Moritz College of Law starting in 1891. The law school opened to 23 students in the basement of the Franklin County Courthouse. He lectured for two years before resigning in 1893.

Williams married Bertha Williams of Amelia, Ohio on May 9, 1860. They had one adopted daughter.

== Notes ==
Legal offices
| Preceded by Martin Dewey Follett | Associate Justice of the Ohio Supreme Court; 1887–1902 | Succeeded by William B. Crew |
Ohio House of Representatives
| Preceded by Samuel F. Kerr | Representative from Fayette County; 1870–1873 | Succeeded by John L. Myers |
