= Emily Taft Douglas =

American politician (1899–1994)

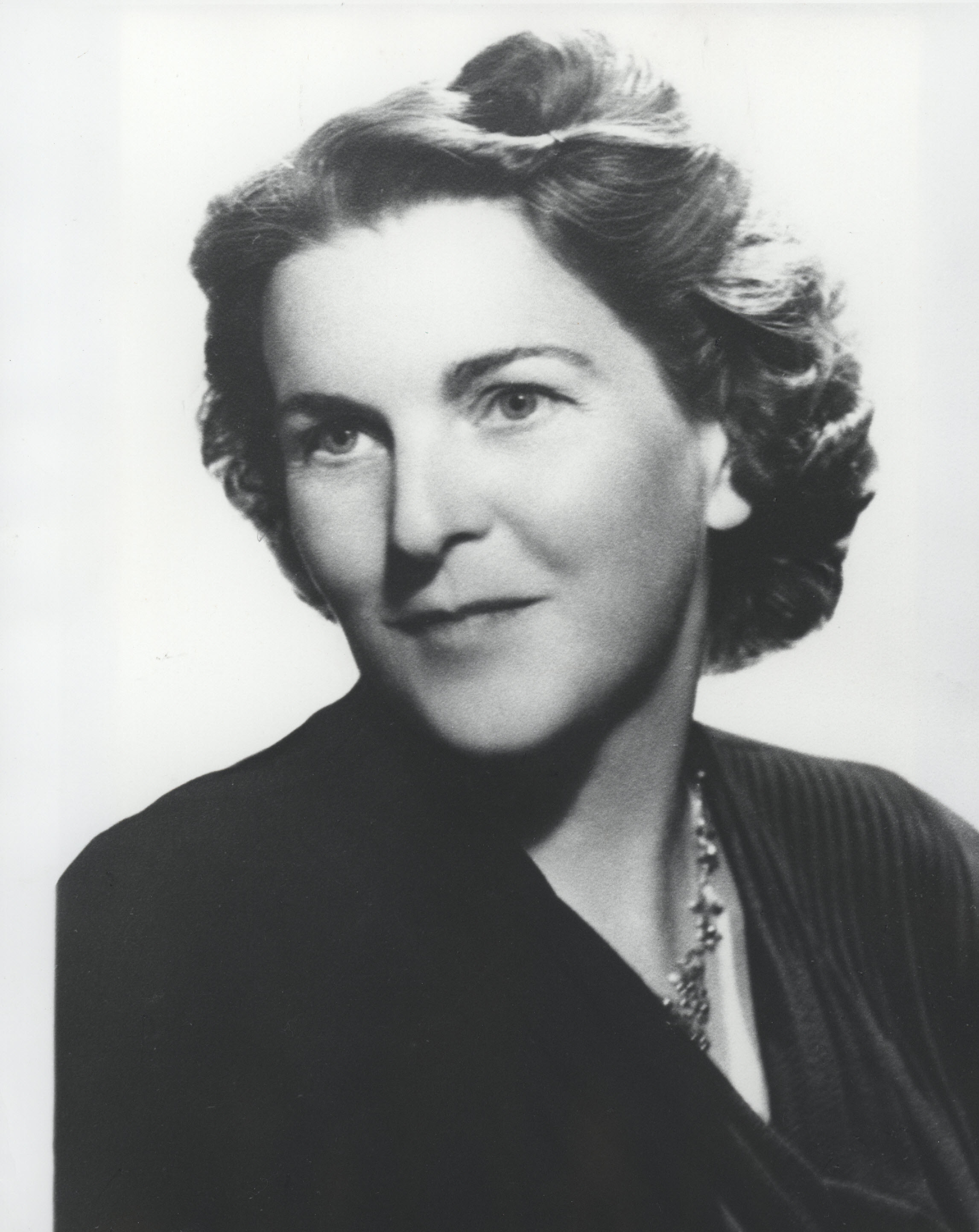

Member of the U.S. House of Representatives from Illinois's at-large district
- In office January 3, 1945 – January 3, 1947
- Preceded by: Stephen A. Day
- Succeeded by: William Stratton

Personal details
- Born: Emily Taft; April 10, 1899 Chicago, Illinois, U.S.
- Died: January 28, 1994 (aged 94) White Plains, New York, U.S.
- Party: Democratic
- Spouse: Paul Douglas (m. 1931; died 1976)
- Children: 4
- Parent: Lorado Taft (father)
- Education: University of Chicago

Emily Taft Douglas (April 10, 1899 – January 28, 1994) was an American Democratic Party politician from Illinois. She served as a U.S. representative at-large from 1945 until 1947 and was married to U.S. Senator Paul Douglas from 1931 until his death in 1976. She was the first female Democrat elected to Congress from Illinois, and her election made Illinois one of the first two states (the other being California) to have been represented by female House members from both main parties.

She was the daughter of sculptor Lorado Taft and a distant relative of U.S. President William Howard Taft.

== Life and career ==
She was born Emily Taft in Chicago, Illinois, to sculptor Lorado Taft and his wife Ada Bartlett Taft. She graduated from the University of Chicago Laboratory School and then the University of Chicago with honors in French. She joined the Democratic Party because of her support for Woodrow Wilson's push for the League of Nations. After graduating from the University of Chicago she studied at the American Academy of Dramatic Art. She was a working actress for two years before going to work for the League of Women Voters in 1924. She married University of Chicago economics professor Paul Douglas in 1931, whom she had met through League of Women Voters functions.

While vacationing in Italy in 1935, the Douglases witnessed the aftermath of Mussolini's invasion of Ethiopia. The experience convinced them that the forces of fascism represented a grave threat to the United States. Both Douglases became involved in Illinois state and local politics in the years leading up to World War II. After the outbreak of the war, Paul Douglas enlisted in the Marine Corps in 1942. Emily Taft Douglas ran for the Illinois at-large congressional seat in 1944, defeating Republican incumbent Stephen A. Day. Day was a member of the isolationist wing of the Republican Party. Douglas ran on a platform advocating the formation of an international alliance of countries.

In addition to working for the formation of the United Nations, Douglas also sought to ban the building or use of nuclear weapons.

Douglas lost her bid for re-election to the United States House of Representatives in 1946. She was appointed US Representative to the United Nations Educational, Scientific and Cultural Organization in 1950. In later life Douglas was active in various Unitarian organizations. In 1986, she moved from Washington to Briarcliff Manor, New York, where she lived until her death. On January 28, 1994, Douglas died at a nursing home in nearby White Plains, New York.

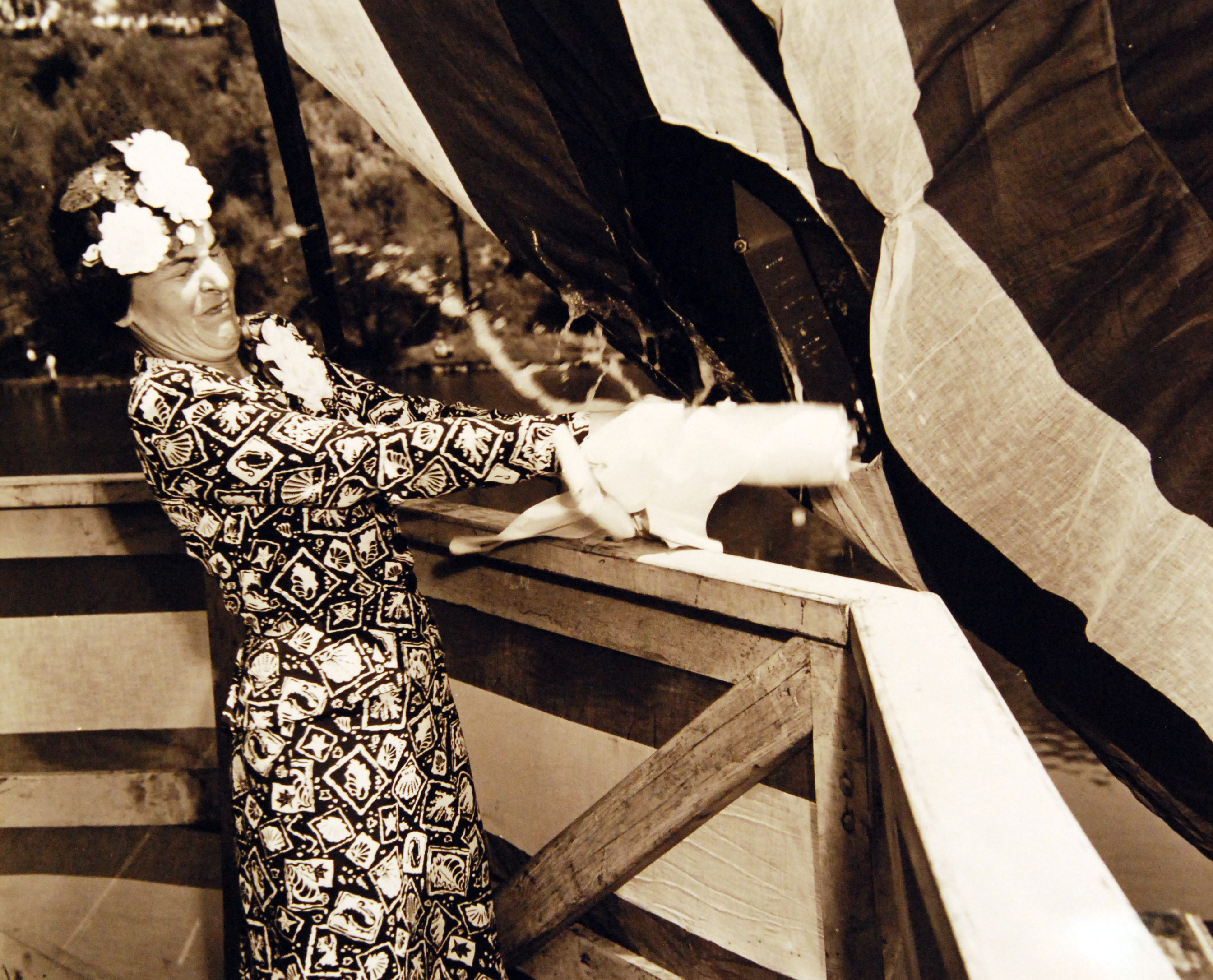
Emily Taft Douglas christening the USS Lagarto (SS-371) on May 28, 1944.

Douglas authored several books, including Appleseed Farm (1948), Remember the ladies; The story of great women who helped shape America (1966), and Margaret Sanger: Pioneer of the Future (1969).

== See also ==
- Women in the United States House of Representatives

U.S. House of Representatives
Preceded by Stephen A. Day	Member of the U.S. House of Representatives from Illinois's at-large congressional district 1945–1947	Succeeded by William Stratton
