= Martin Dewey Follett =

American judge

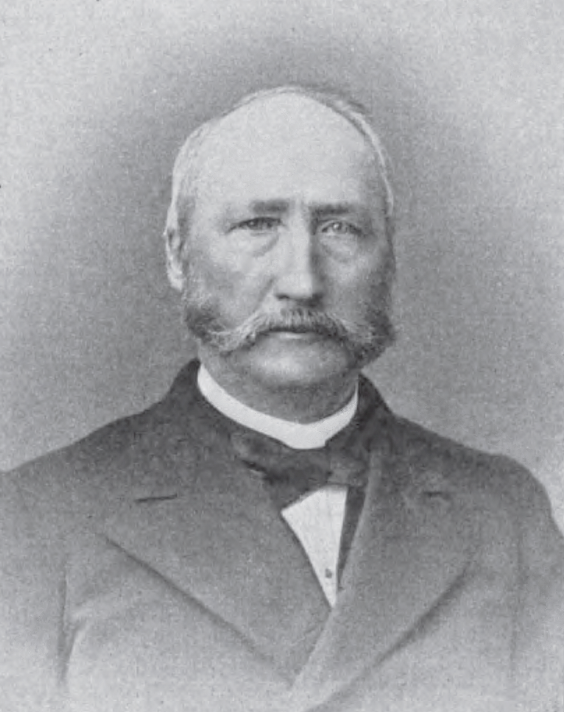

Associate Justice of the Ohio Supreme Court
- In office December 1883 – February 9, 1887
- Preceded by: John H. Doyle
- Succeeded by: Marshall Jay Williams

Personal details
- Born: October 8, 1826 Enosburg, Vermont
- Died: August 22, 1911 (aged 84) Marietta, Ohio
- Resting place: Mound Cemetery
- Party: Democratic
- Spouse(s): Harriet L. Shipman; Abbie M. Bailey
- Children: five
- Education: Marietta College

Martin Dewey Follett (October 8, 1826 – August 22, 1911) was a Democratic politician in the U.S. State of Ohio who was an Ohio Supreme Court Judge 1883–1887.

Martin Dewey Follett was born at Enosburg, Franklin County, Vermont. In 1836 his family settled in Licking County, Ohio, where he grew up. He taught school, then entered and graduated from Marietta College in 1853 with a BA. In 1856 he earned an MA. He taught high school for a year in Newark, and two years at Marietta, where he was elected superintendent of schools in 1856, and served two years.

In 1856, Follett was married to Harriet L. Shipman, of Marietta, who had four children, and in 1875 he married Abbie M. Bailey, of Lowell, Massachusetts, who had one child. Follett was admitted to the bar in 1858. In 1864, he was a delegate to the Democratic National Convention which nominated George B. McClellan.

In 1866, Follett was nominated for the Congress by the Democratic party, but lost the fifteenth district to Tobias A. Plants. In 1868 he lost the same district to Eliakim H. Moore.

Follett won election for Ohio Supreme Court judge over Republican William H. Upson in 1883, and was seated in December of that year. He ran for re-election in October 1886, but lost to Marshall Jay Williams. He served until his term expired in February, 1887.

Follett was a life member of the Ohio Archaeological and Historical Society, and for ten years beginning in 1895 was a trustee of the society. Follett died in 1911 at home in Marietta. He was buried at Mound Cemetery.

== See also ==
- List of justices of the Ohio Supreme Court

== Notes ==
Legal offices
Preceded by William H. Upson	Associate Justice of the Ohio Supreme Court; 1883–1887	Succeeded by Marshall Jay Williams
