= William Louis Day =

American judge (1876–1936)

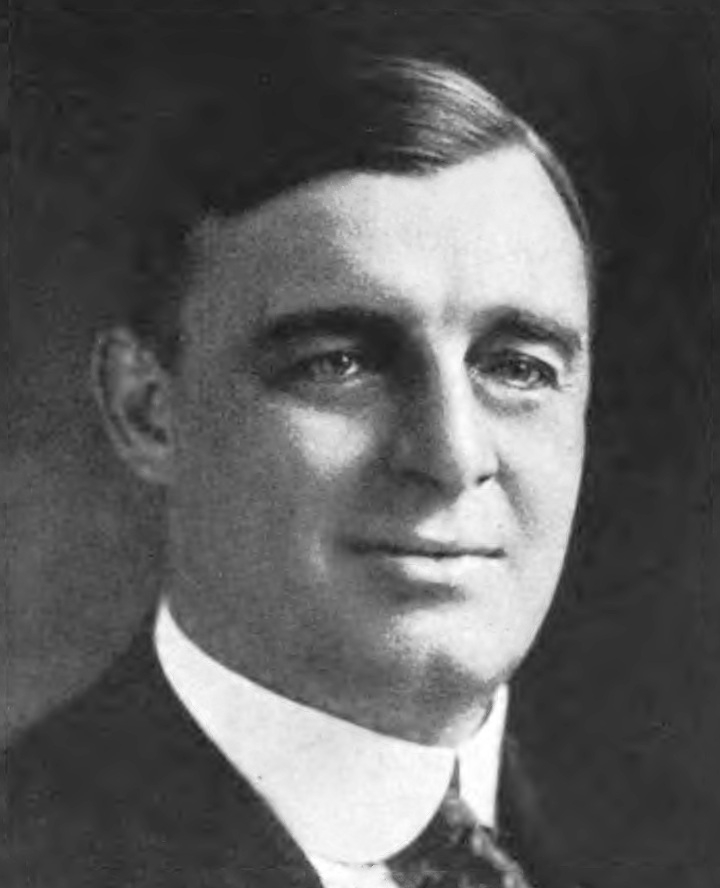
- Day, c. 1921

Judge of the United States District Court for the Northern District of Ohio
- In office May 9, 1911 – May 1, 1914
- Appointed by: William Howard Taft
- Preceded by: Robert Walker Tayler
- Succeeded by: John Hessin Clarke

Personal details
- Born: August 13, 1876 Canton, Ohio, U.S.
- Died: July 15, 1936 (aged 59) Wade Park Manor, Ohio, U.S.
- Resting place: West Lawn Cemetery; Canton, Ohio
- Spouse: Elizabeth E. McKay (m. 1902)
- Parent: William R. Day (father)
- Relatives: Stephen A. Day (brother); Zephaniah Swift Spalding (great-uncle); Robert H. Day (half-uncle); Luther Day (paternal grandfather)
- Education: University of Michigan Law School (LLB)

William Louis Day (August 13, 1876 – July 15, 1936) was a United States district judge of the United States District Court for the Northern District of Ohio.

== Early life ==
William Louis Day was born on August 13, 1876, in Canton, Ohio, to Mary Elizabeth (née Schaefer) and Justice William R. Day of the United States Supreme Court. He attended Williston Seminary (now Williston Northampton School) and received a Bachelor of Laws in 1900 from the University of Michigan Law School.

== Career ==
Day entered private practice in Canton from 1900 to 1908. He was city solicitor for Canton from 1906 to 1908. He was the United States Attorney for the Northern District of Ohio from 1908 to 1911.

Day was nominated by President William Howard Taft on April 6, 1911, to a seat on the United States District Court for the Northern District of Ohio vacated by Judge Robert Walker Tayler. He was confirmed by the United States Senate on May 9, 1911, and received his commission the same day. His service terminated on May 1, 1914, due to his resignation.

Following his resignation from the federal bench, Day resumed private practice in Cleveland, Ohio from 1914 to 1936. He was a member of the law firm of Squire, Sanders & Dempsey from 1914 to 1919. He served as special counsel for the Ohio Attorney General in 1919.

== Personal life ==
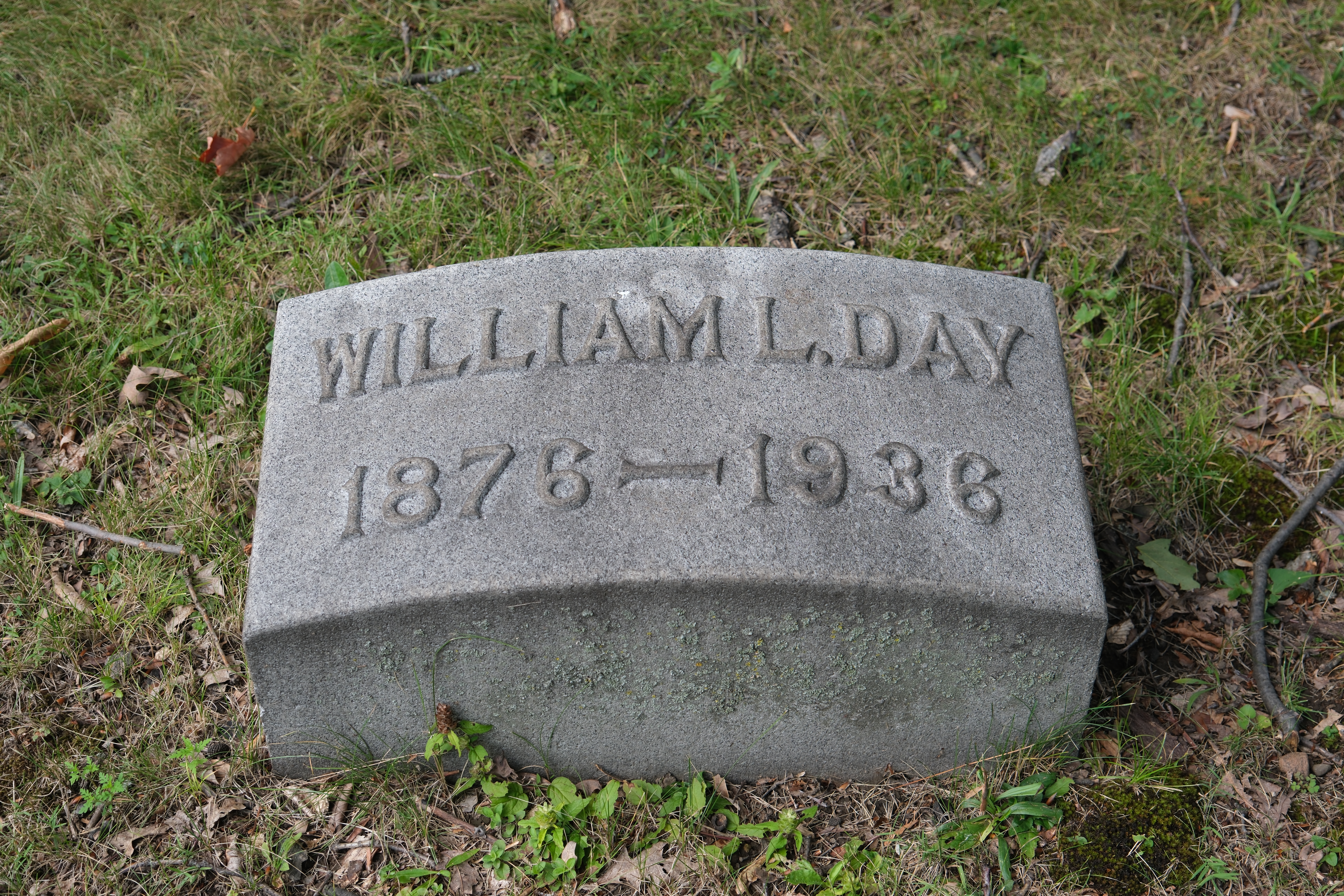
Grave of Day in West Lawn Cemetery

Day married Elizabeth E. McKay of Caro, Michigan, on September 10, 1902. He died on July 15, 1936, in Wade Park Manor, Ohio. He was interred in West Lawn Cemetery in Canton.

== Sources ==
Legal offices
Preceded by Robert Walker Tayler	Judge of the United States District Court for the Northern District of Ohio; 1911–1914	Succeeded by John Hessin Clarke
