= J. J. P. Corrigan =

American judge

James Joseph Patrick (J J P) Corrigan

Associate Justice of the Ohio Supreme Court
- In office September 11, 1969 – December 31, 1976
- Appointed by: Jim Rhodes
- Preceded by: Charles B. Zimmerman
- Succeeded by: A. William Sweeney

Personal details
- Born: July 27, 1901 Cleveland, Ohio
- Died: May 16, 1982 (aged 80) Ohio
- Resting place: Lakewood Park Cemetery
- Party: Republican
- Spouse: Nancy McGuiness
- Education: John Carroll University; Georgetown University Law School
- Awards: Bronze Star

Military service
- Allegiance: United States
- Branch/service: United States Army
- Years of service: 1942–1945
- Rank: Second lieutenant
- Battles/wars: World War II; D Day

James Joseph Patrick (J. J. P.) Corrigan (July 27, 1901 – May 16, 1982) was a Republican lawyer from Ohio. He was in private practice for thirty years and a judge for twenty years, including 1969–1976 as an associate justice of the Ohio Supreme Court. He also landed on Normandy Beach during Operation Overlord on June 6, 1944.

== Biography ==
Corrigan was born in Cleveland, Ohio on July 27, 1901 to Irish immigrants, Patrick and Nora Walsh Corrigan. He received a bachelor's degree in 1922 from John Carroll University. He moved to Washington, D.C., received a master's degree in law and juris doctor from Georgetown University Law School in 1925 and was admitted to the Washington, D.C. bar.

Corrigan returned to Cleveland in 1926, passed the Ohio bar, and had a private practice as a trial and appeals lawyer from 1926 to 1956. He was chief assistant police prosecutor of Cleveland under Mayor Harry L. Davis from 1933 to 1937. In 1942, he was drafted into the United States Army as a private. He landed on Normandy beach on June 6, 1944, and fought in campaigns in northern France, Ardennes, Rhineland and central Europe. He received battlefield promotion to second lieutenant and was awarded five battle stars and a Bronze Star Medal. He was honorably discharged October 1945.

In 1956, Corrigan was elected a judge of the Cuyahoga County Court of Common Pleas, serving from 1957 to 1963. In 1962, he was elected to the 8th District Court of Appeals for Ohio for a six-year term, and re-elected in 1968. He taught trial practice at Cleveland–Marshall College of Law from 1963 to 1969.

In June 1969, Ohio Supreme Court Associate Justice Charles B. Zimmerman died. Governor Jim Rhodes appointed Corrigan to fill the unexpired term on September 11, 1969. He was elected to a six-year term in 1970, but was barred by age restriction from running for another term in 1976.

After retirement from the bench, Corrigan was a partner in the Cleveland firm Marshman, Snyder and Corrigan from 1978 until his death on May 16, 1982. Corrigan married Nancy McGuiness on February 26, 1948. He is buried in Lakewood Park Cemetery.
