= Charles B. Zimmerman =

American judge

Associate Justice of the Ohio Supreme Court
- In office October 4, 1933 – November 1934
- Appointed by: George White
- Preceded by: Robert H. Day
- Succeeded by: W. F. Garver
- In office January 1, 1935 – June 4, 1969
- Preceded by: W. F. Garver
- Succeeded by: J. J. P. Corrigan

Personal details
- Born: June 22, 1891 Springfield, Ohio, U.S.
- Died: June 4, 1969 (aged 77) Columbus, Ohio, U.S.
- Resting place: Ferncliff Cemetery, Springfield
- Party: Democratic
- Spouse: Dorothy Gayford
- Children: 3
- Education: Wittenberg University; Harvard Law School

Charles Ballard Zimmerman (June 22, 1891 – June 4, 1969) was a lawyer from Springfield, Ohio. He was a justice of the Ohio Supreme Court from 1933 until his death.

== Biography ==
Charles B. Zimmerman was born June 22, 1891, in Springfield, Ohio to John Luther and Helen Ballard Zimmerman. After graduating from Wittenberg University in 1911, he attended Harvard Law School from 1911 to 1913.

Zimmerman returned to Ohio, where he was admitted to the bar in 1913, and was admitted to practice in the federal courts and before the United States Court of Appeals for the Sixth Circuit in 1915. He practiced in Springfield with his father and brother from 1913 to 1933. From 1917 to 1919, he was an officer with the Ohio National Guard and the 4th and 82nd Divisions of the U.S. Army. He was a major in the Judge Advocate General's Corps.

Zimmerman lost election for Ohio's 7th congressional district as the Democratic nominee in 1922, lost election for Ohio Attorney General in 1926, and lost election for the Ohio Supreme Court in 1932.

Robert H. Day, a justice of the Ohio Supreme Court, died September 29, 1933. On October 4, 1933, Ohio Governor George White appointed Zimmerman to fill Day's unexpired term. He took the oath of office on October 10.

In 1934, Zimmerman chose not to run for the short term, the last two months of Day's term, but did run for a full six-year term. W. F. Garver won the short term, and served from November to December 31, 1934. Zimmerman won the full term.

Zimmerman ran for re-election in 1940, 1946, 1952, 1958, and 1964, winning each time. He announced in 1967 that he would not seek re-election in 1970, and intended to return to private practice in Springfield with his son. In May 1969, a lung tumor was discovered and surgically removed, but Zimmerman died at University Hospital, Columbus on June 4, 1969. The funeral was at First Lutheran Church in Springfield, where he was a member, and burial was at Ferncliff Cemetery in Springfield.

Zimmerman married Dorothy Gayford in 1930, and three children were born to them. Zimmeman never bought a house in the state capital of Columbus, he rode a bus from Springfield at the beginning of each week, and rode back to Springfield each Friday. He slept on a cot in his office.
