= Confession of judgment =

Confession of judgment is a legal term that refers to a type of contract (or a clause with such a provision) in which a party agrees to let the other party enter a judgment against them. Such contracts are highly controversial and may be invalidated as a violation of due process by courts, since the obligor is essentially contracting away his right to raise any legitimate defenses.

== United States ==
Confessions of judgment are permitted in many states. New Jersey and Pennsylvania permit them, among others. Some states, including Michigan, require they be specially labelled or have other procedural requirements. However, according to testimony before an Alaska State Legislature committee, "Confession of Judgment is illegal in Alaska, it's illegal in Pennsylvania in consumer transactions, but not in commercial transactions." A Law Review article distinguishes three groups of state laws, one group comprising seventeen states that make void any agreement to confess judgment entered into before commencement of a suit.

A typical confession of judgment reads, "The undersigned irrevocably authorizes any attorney to appear in any court of competent jurisdiction and confess a judgment without process in favor of the creditor for such amount as may then appear unpaid hereon, and to consent to immediate execution upon such judgment."

Such clauses should be distinguished from liquidated damages clauses, which do not result in binding judgments against the obligor.

A confession of judgment may also be called a cognovit note.

=== Risks ===
In the example: "The undersigned irrevocably authorizes any attorney to appear in any court of competent jurisdiction and confess a judgment without process in favor of the creditor for such amount as may then appear unpaid hereon, and to consent to immediate execution upon such judgment.", there is an unlimited risk if the amounts, such as "amount as may then appear unpaid", are not exactly defined or capped in the contract, as collection, processing, contract or administrative fees can be set to any arbitrary amount.

Additionally, no conditions are set for "authorization" such as a breach of terms, a late payment or a default in payment, and collection can occur without notice. The first the "undersigned" will know anything is awry is that assets have already been seized, cash funds already withdrawn or bank accounts sequestered.

This may not be legal in many states, but if a judgment is passed in a state where it is legal, then the judgment can be applied in any US state or country that honor US court judgments such as Puerto Rico.

The Confession of Judgment waives all legal rights to due process in the court system.

=== Recent jurisprudence ===
The United States Supreme Court issued two rulings in 1972 relating to confessions of judgment. It held that:

- confession of judgment procedures do not violate due process if the waiver of constitutional rights made by a confession of judgment is voluntary, knowing, and intelligently made.
- confessions must be reviewed on a case-by-case basis; where the contract is one of adhesion, where there is great disparity of bargaining power, and where the debtor receives nothing for the confession, the waiver of rights may not be valid.

Relying on Overmyer, the California Supreme Court ruled in 1978 that the confession of judgment procedure, as constituted in that State, was constitutionally invalid, ruling:

Because the California statutes provide insufficient safeguards to assure that the debtor in fact executed a voluntary, knowing, and intelligent waiver, and because the debtor's opportunity to seek post-judgment relief does not cure the unconstitutionality of a judgment entered without a valid waiver, we conclude that the confession of judgment procedure established in sections 1132 through 1134 violates the due process clause of the Fourteenth Amendment.

In 1990, the California Court of Appeal for the First District ruled that California courts will not enforce judgments from other states entered on confessions of judgment to the extent that such judgments fail to comply with the strict due process requirements outlined in Isbell.

== Canada ==
The use of the cognovit actionem began to be restricted in Upper Canada in 1857, with passage of a requirement that such instruments be registered within thirty days at the County Court (a predecessor of the present Ontario Superior Court of Justice). Further provision was made the following year to void any such confession entered into by an insolvent person to either defeat or delay his creditors or to give a fraudulent preference. Cognovit actionem eventually fell into disuse, and was abolished in 1913 as a result of the reform of the civil procedure rules that year.

The procedure has also been abolished in British Columbia.

== See also ==
- Confession of error
