= Luther Day =

American judge (1813–1885)

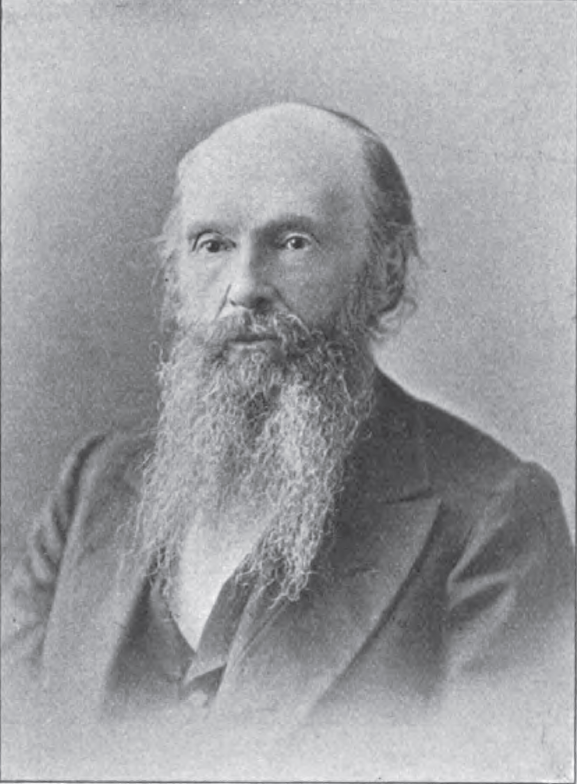

Associate Justice of the Supreme Court of Ohio
- In office February 9, 1865 – February 9, 1875
- Preceded by: Horace Wilder
- Succeeded by: William J. Gilmore

Member of the Ohio Senate from the 26th district
- In office 1864–1864
- Preceded by: Lucius V. Bierce
- Succeeded by: Alphonso Hart

Personal details
- Born: July 9, 1813 Granville, New York, U.S.
- Died: March 8, 1885 (aged 71) Ravenna, Ohio, U.S.
- Resting place: Maple Grove Cemetery, Ravenna
- Party: Republican
- Spouse(s): Emily Swift Spalding, Ellen I. Barnes
- Children: 9, including William R. Day and Robert H. Day
- Relatives: William Louis Day (grandson); Stephen A. Day (grandson); Anna Gunn (great-great-great-granddaughter)
- Education: Middlebury College
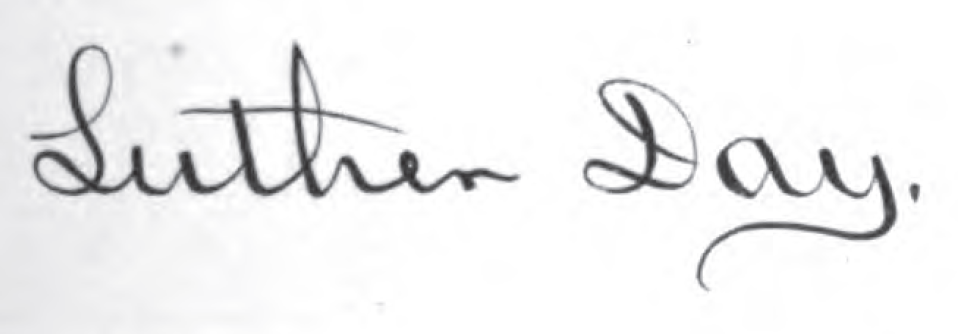
- Signature

Luther Day (July 9, 1813 – March 8, 1885) was a Republican politician in the U.S. State of Ohio who was in the Ohio Senate and a judge on the Ohio Supreme Court 1865–1875.

== Life and career ==
Day was born at Granville, Washington County, New York, and attended common schools. His father died when Luther was twelve, and he worked until age twenty to support the family at a farm and sawmill. In 1835, he entered Middlebury College in Vermont, and studied for three years. He moved to Ravenna, Portage County, Ohio, studied law under Rufus P. Spalding, and was admitted to the bar October 8, 1840.

In 1843, Day was elected Prosecuting Attorney of Portage County but moved to Akron in 1845 for about a year. On July 24, 1845, Day married Rufus Spalding's daughter, Emily Swift Spalding. Back in Ravenna, he was elected Prosecutor again in 1849. In 1850, he was an unsuccessful Democratic Party candidate for the United States House of Representatives. In 1851 he was elected Common Pleas Judge and served two terms.

April 10, 1852, Mrs. Day died, and Day remarried April 26, 1854, to Ellen I. Barnes of Lanesboro, Massachusetts. His second term on the court expired in 1857, and he returned to private practice.

When the American Civil War started, Day became a Republican. He was appointed Judge Advocate General by Governor Tod. In 1863, he was elected to the Ohio Senate for the 56th General Assembly but resigned in 1864.

Day resigned his Senate seat because he was elected a judge on the Ohio Supreme Court in 1864. He was re-elected in 1869 but failed at the polls in 1874. In 1875, Governor Allen appointed him a member of the commission to revise the statutes of the State, and he resigned that position when appointed by Governor Hayes to the Supreme Court Commission of Ohio in 1876. He retired from that service and died at Ravenna in 1885

Day's first wife had three children, including William R. Day of Canton, Ohio. His second wife had six children, including Robert H. Day of Massillon, Ohio. and a daughter, Anna B. Day who was born 1872 and died in 1959. Anna married Per Lee Hunt.
