= Judgement Day (comics) =

Judgement Day in comics may refer to:

- Judgment Day (Awesome Comics), by Alan Moore and Rob Liefeld
- "Judgement Day" (EC Comics), a pivotal EC Comics science-fiction story dealing with racial prejudice produced in 1953 and reprinted - in violation of the Comics Code Authority - in 1955.
- Judgement Day (Judge Dredd story), one of the Judge Dredd epics
- Judgement Day (Lightning Comics), a short-lived comic book series from Lightning Comics
- Judgment Day (Marvel Comics), a 2022 storyline featuring The Avengers, X-Men and Eternals

== See also ==
- Day of Judgment (comics), a comic book storyline featuring the Justice League Of America fighting demonic forces
