= Judgment Night =

Judgment Night may refer to:

- "Judgment Night" (The Twilight Zone), a 1959 TV episode
- Judgment Night (film), a 1993 action thriller film
  - Judgment Night (soundtrack)
- Judgment Night (collection), a 1952 short-story collection by C. L. Moore
