= Hopewell Academy =

American private school in North Carolina

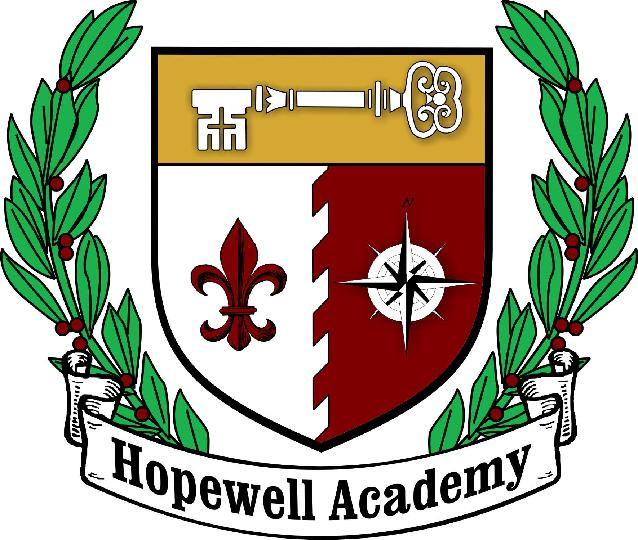

Location
- 101 Preston Executive Drive; Cary, North Carolina 27513; United States
- 35°48′47″N 78°48′37″W

Information
- Type: Private
- Founded: 2004 (22 years ago)
- Closed: 2020
- CEEB code: 340607
- Head teacher: Randy K. Taylor
- Grades: 6–12
- Enrollment: 51 as of January 2018
- Colors: Cardinal and navy
- Athletics conference: Central Carolina Athletic League
- Mascot: Tigers
- Accreditation: SACS
- Tuition: Varies with grade level
- Website: www.hopewellacademy.org

Hopewell Academy used to be a small private, coeducational, college preparatory school in Cary, North Carolina.

== History ==
Hopewell was founded in 2004 by Cecilia Gabriel. It officially opened in 2005 with grades 7–12. The school served grades 6–12. Hopewell closed indefinitely after the 2019–2020 school year, due to a lack of funding.

== Academics and student life ==
The school had a wide range of extracurricular activities. After school sports included basketball, soccer, volleyball, and cross country. Hopewell was a member of the Central Carolina Athletic Conference.

The school colors were Cardinal and Navy, the mascot was the Tiger, and it was accredited by SACS.

Among other state of the art features and academic programs, it also used to include student organizations including Art Club, Drama Club, and Chess Club.
