= Judgement Day (TV series) =

- Genre: Game show
- Presented by: Brian Conley
- Country of origin: United Kingdom
- Original language: English
- No. of series: 1
- No. of episodes: 6

Production
- Running time: 60 minutes (inc. adverts)
- Production company: Endemol UK Productions

Original release
- Network: ITV
- Release: 28 June – 2 August 2003

Judgement Day is a British game show that broadcast on ITV, and presented by comedian and entertainer Brian Conley. The show was broadcast on Saturday nights, but due to low viewing figures of about 3 million (which was ITV's lowest recorded figures at the time) the show was pulled after two episodes. This was the final show by Conley to be shown on ITV. Following this, he went on to perform on stage, and within the past year, has made a TV comeback on the BBC.

Whilst this is classed as ITV's lowest ratings, their reality show, Tycoon was pulled temporarily after just figures of 1.9 million, and The Marriage Ref in 2011, which sunk to just 1.4 million viewers.

One of the winners of the show, Jonny Breeze, won £30,000 but this was one of the episodes that never aired.
