= Wade Park District =

- U.S. National Register of Historic Places
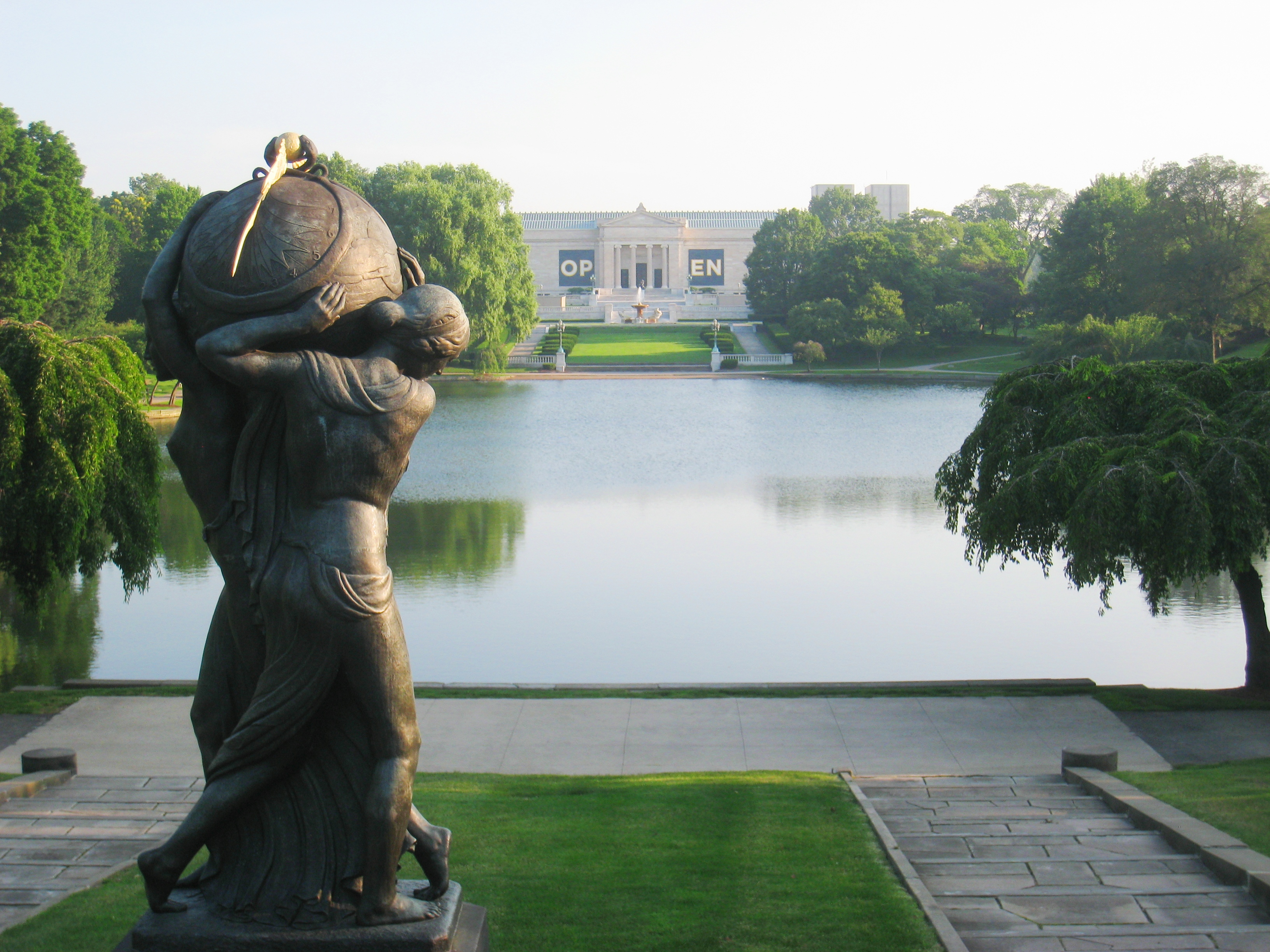
- View of the museum from the steps of the Euclid Avenue entrance to Wade Park, overlooking the Lagoon. Seen in the foreground is Frank Jirouch's 1928 bronze sculpture, Night Passing the Earth to Day.

- Location within Cleveland Location within Ohio Location within the United States
- Location: Roughly bounded by E. 105 St., East Blvd., Chester and Euclid Aves. Cleveland, Ohio 44106
- Coordinates: 41°28′24″N 81°37′22″W
- Built: 1872–1892
- Architectural style: Late Victorian
- NRHP reference No.: 82001372
- Added to NRHP: 1982

The Wade Park District is an historic district on the National Register of Historic Places, located in the University Circle neighborhood on the east side of Cleveland, Ohio. The district, which covers roughly 650 acres, is bounded by Chester Avenue and Euclid Avenue (which converge in a triangle) on the south, East Boulevard to the east and E. 105th Street to the west. The district, which includes seven separate buildings, features several of the city's cultural institutions, as well as the park of the same name.

== History ==
Jeptha Wade arrived in Cleveland in the 1850s, already having amassed part of his fortune in the telegraph industry, and proceeded to become one of the city's wealthiest residents by expanding his holdings into the industries of steel and banking. Like Marcus Hanna, John D Rockefeller and John Severance, his contemporaries along Euclid Avenue's 'Millionaire's Row', Wade used his industrial wealth to endow cultural and educational institutions. In 1882, he donated 63 acres (250,000 m^{2}) of land east of the city for the purpose of creating a park, which was named in his honor. Today, the bequeathed Wade property serves as the campus for some of Cleveland's best-known tourist attractions.

== Wade Park ==
While not part of the NRHP listing, Wade Park was constructed from land donated by Jeptha Wade, who expressly intended part of it as the location for an art museum. Today, the most prominent features of Wade Park are the Cleveland Museum of Art and the adjacent Wade Park Lagoon, both of which sit at the park's main entrance at southern tip of the historic district.

== Attractions ==
- Cleveland Museum of Art
- Cleveland Botanical Gardens
- Cleveland Institute of Art
- Cleveland Institute of Music
- Severance Hall
- Cleveland Museum of Natural History
- Western Reserve Historical Society
- Crawford Auto-Aviation Museum
- Epworth Euclid Church
