= List of Blassreiter episodes =

Official Blassreiter DVD of Volume 1 released in Japan.

Blassreiter is an anime series created and produced by Gonzo. It is directed by Ichiro Itano and written by Yasuko Kobayashi. The show had aired 24 episodes from April 5 to September 27, 2008. Blassreiter had been previously aired on TV by AT-X, Chiba TV, Sun TV, TV Kanagawa and TV Saitama. A North American release by Funimation Entertainment has been announced.

Set in the near future Germany, it portrays hideous demonic being called Demoniacs or Amalgams on the prowl on German soil attacking civilians and were said to be from the dead. The Bundezpolizei establishes an anti-Demoniac unit called the Xenogenesis Assault Team, armed with military-grade weapons and equipment to protect the German populace from Demoniacs and to spearhead anti-Demoniac operations. Individuals who are able to control the Demoniac powers and use them to fight against them on their own terms or to destroy the world are called Blassreiters.

Prior to airing of the show, GONZO and Nitro+ had posted a promotional movie of Blassreiter on their website.

GRANRODEO announced on their website's information page entry dated on April 4, 2008, that the OP song of Blassreiter, "Detarame na Zanzō", would be included in their upcoming album Not for Sale, which would be released on May 14, 2008. On Aki Misato's website on 29 February 2008, she announced that she would be doing the ending song of Blassreiter, "sad rain", with a planned release of a Blassreiter ED soundtrack on May 14, 2008.

Minami Kuribayashi's song "unripe hero" is used as the opening theme from episode 15 to 24 with Kanako Itō's "A Wish for the Stars" is used as the ending theme after episode 13 right up to the end. For the final episode, the opening uses scenes from the previous episodes and the song plays the second verse and chorus instead of the first.

== Episodes ==
No.	Title	Written by	Original release date	English Airdate
1	"Prelude to Despair"; Transliteration: "Zetsubō no Hajimari" (Japanese: 絶望の始まり)	Yasuko Kobayashi	5 April 2008	August 27, 2010
During a motorcycle race in Germany, a Demoniac attacks German policeman stationed at the race track before taking control of an ambulance and attacking several competitors. Motorcycle star Gerd Frentzen faces off against the Demoniac before armed XAT officers cordon the area. An unknown being in a blue Blassreiter form appears and kills the Demoniac. In the process, Gerd is injured and paralyzed from his waist down. Gerd is disillusioned when he discovers that he is being dropped from the team and Igor will take his place. Some time later, a mysterious doctor, Beatrice Grese, offers Gerd an experimental drug. During an XAT-led operation to track down a Demoniac hiding in an industrial complex, a Blassreiter appears and destroys the Demoniac. XAT officers Hermann Saltza and Amanda Werner are shocked to see the Blassreiter transform into Gerd who has fully recovered his ability to walk. Beatrice Grese seems satisfied with the results of her experiment with Gerd.
2	"The Price of Glory"; Transliteration: "Eiyo no Taika" (Japanese: 栄誉の対価)	Yasuko Kobayashi	12 April 2008	August 30, 2010
XAT begins to conduct surveillance on Gerd after discovering that he has Blassreiter powers, despite being popular with the German public and his elimination of Demoniacs. Gerd heads back to meet his former girlfriend Jill Hoffmann, but sees her in the arms of his manager Matthew Grant who says that he'd been planning to drop Gerd from the team even before his accident. Enraged, Gerd transforms into his Blassreiter form and almost strangles Jill before Grant stabs Gerd and the XAT officers arrive. Gerd flees on his motorcycle, but is pursued by the blue Blassreiter. He escapes and is then chased by Hermann, however, due to the lack of control over his Blassreiter power, Gerd crashes off a cliff and his motorcycle is destroyed in an explosion.
3	"The Infection Spreads"; Transliteration: "Kansen kakudai" (Japanese: 感染拡大)	Yasuko Kobayashi	19 April 2008	August 31, 2010
Despite efforts to locate Gerd's possible corpse, the XAT only find his ruined motorcycle. As a precaution, XAT isolate Jill and Matthew after their contact with Gerd's Blassreiter form and continue the search for the blue Blassreiter who is declared a high priority target by Wolf Göring. Meanwhile Amanda's brother Malek is being mocked by delinquents, but Joseph Jobson comes to his aid. Matthew turns into a Demoniac from exposure to Gerd's blood when he stabbed Gerd at Jill's house. The blue Blassreiter, Joseph Jobson, pursues him, but they are both hit by XAT rockets. Matthew goes back to Jill's house, where he becomes a Blassreiter, but Joseph Jobson again attacks Matthew and this time he finally destroys him.
4	"Under Siege"; Transliteration: "Hōimō" (Japanese: 包囲網)	Yasuko Kobayashi	26 April 2008	September 1, 2010
XAT is mobilized into action when multiple Demoniacs appear in several town blocks and attack armed policeman. Joseph intervenes in his Blassreiter form and chases down the Demoniacs but some XAT operatives hold him responsible for massacring policemen when they arrive late on the scene. His actions in protecting a citizen and consequent wounding cause Amanda Werner to question whether Joseph is really XAT's enemy. Jill's condition from contact with Gerd's blood becomes worse, forcing Wolf to have her heavily sedated. Meanwhile, Malek is beaten up by his friend Johann who is also pressured by the delinquents. Gerd survived his crash and is seen killing a motorcycle-possessed Demoniac out on the highway. However he has confusing visions and problems managing his Blassreiter form.
5	"The Disdained"; Transliteration: "Utomareshi mono" (Japanese: 疎まれし者)	Yasuko Kobayashi	3 May 2008	September 2, 2010
Igor takes his motorcycle onto the track for late night practice when Gerd appears and they race each other. When Igor tries to run Gerd off the track he crashes. Later, on TV, he accuses Gerd of trying to kill him. Meanwhile Malek finds the injured Joseph and treats his wound. Jill is being transferred under XAT escort as precaution against an attack from Gerd, when she turns into a Demoniac and attacks the escort team. Gerd confronts and kills the Demoniac Jill, while under the eye of the media, and in his confusion, he takes out the media chopper flying overhead and retaliates when the XAT forces attack him. Hermann finally reaches through to him and Gerd returns to his human form. When Hermann gives Gerd the fan letter Malek wrote to him, Gerd angrily takes off, knowing that he isn't the hero that some people think he is any more.
6	"The Song that Pities the Demon"; Transliteration: "Akuma o awaremu uta" (Japanese: 悪魔を憐れむ歌)	Yasuko Kobayashi	10 May 2008	September 3, 2010
Joseph confronts Gerd, both in their Blassreiter forms, but after Joseph reveals his human form, Gerd asks Joseph to do him a small favor. At home, Amanda is about to confront Malek about his frequent absences from school when Hermann arrives and asks Malek to go with him and help reason with his idol, Gerd. Hermann and Malek meet Gerd and the two motorcycle racers decide to race for old times, watched by Joseph. During the race Gerd imagines that Hermann is a Demoniac and forces him to crash. As Gerd succumbs to the demonic side of the Blassreiter form, seeing everyone as Demoniacs, Joseph appears and kills Gerd, fulfilling the promise he made to end his life should he no longer control his Blassreiter powers.
7	"At the End of Hatred"; Transliteration: "Zōo no hate ni" (Japanese: 憎悪の果てに)	Yasuko Kobayashi	17 May 2008	September 6, 2010
Johann, Malek's friend, commits suicide, feeling guilty over attacking Malek to avoid being beaten by the delinquents himself. Beatrice Grese delivers a video to the XAT revealing Joseph's human face. Malek begins to lose faith in god for the unfair treatment of Johann and his family and doesn't believe Amanda's promise to protect him. Meanwhile, the principal from Malek's school bribes Johann's mother to keep things quiet to preserve the establishment's reputation. While the police and XAT are on the hunt to capture Joseph, Beatrice appears to Malek and offers him the same pill she gave to Gerd that cured his paraplegia but also created his Blassreiter form.
8	"Weak No Longer"; Transliteration: "Boku wa mō yowamushi ja nai" (Japanese: 僕はもう弱虫じゃない)	Yasuko Kobayashi	24 May 2008	September 7, 2010
Wolf is told by Beatrice that he came in contact with Demoniac blood and is going to become an Amalgam too. Beatrice also reveals the evolutionary process of the Demoniacs, how the infection spreads and the threat that Joseph Jobson poses to her plans. After taking the pill from Beatrice, Malek develops Blassreiter powers and kills the delinquents. Joseph detects Malek's actions so he rides to the school and tries to reason with Malek who is fighting the XAT forces. Malek attacks instead, then Joseph is wounded when he defends Malek from a .50 caliber sniper shot from Bradley "Brad" Guildford. After realizing that the Demoniac is Malek, Amanda shields him with her own body enabling Malek to escape from XAT, taking the wounded Joseph with him.
9	"The Price and the Meaning of Power"; Transliteration: "Chikara no kachi, chikara no imi" (Japanese: 力の価値、力の意味)	Yasuko Kobayashi	31 May 2008	September 8, 2010
Wolf takes Amanda off active duty due to her relationship with Malek, referred to as Yellow. Amanda thinks back to when she adopted Malek and how she was unable to protect him. She breaks orders and tries to find Malek with Hermann. Malek and Joseph are hiding in an old church with Joseph badly wounded when they are found by Magwald Xargin. He attacks and nearly kills both of them without even changing to his Demoniac form. Amanda and Hermann arrive just after Xargin leaves and Malek regains consciousness long enough for him to tell Amanda that he regrets killing the delinquents. Joseph and Hermann are both shaken when they see Malek lose consciousness again.
10	"Inside the Conspiracy"; Transliteration: "Inbō no naka de" (Japanese: 陰謀の中で)	Gen Urobuchi	7 June 2008	September 9, 2010
Malek and Joseph are held in an experimental facility at the XAT, Joseph slowly self-repairing, but Malek still in a coma. Alvin "Al" Lutz and Brad tell Hermann and Amanda that they believe the Demoniacs are the result of human weapons research. With the help of a technician, Hermann and Amanda try to analyze Joseph and discover confidential information about Blassreiters. Victor Stachus then has Amanda and Hermann taken into custody fearing that the information will get out. Meanwhile, Amalgams are detected and while fighting them, Al and Brad see the new anti-Amalgum Paladin machines piloted by Geige, Senger and Clavier. As he recovers, Joseph has nightmarish visions of past events. While Wolf is having sex with Beatrice, he asks if he too will become a monster to be hunted and killed, but she says that it is up to him. She shows him her vision of the future, dominated by Demoniacs.
11	"Prelude to Apocalypse"; Transliteration: "Mokushiroku no josō" (Japanese: 黙示録の序奏)	Gen Urobuchi	14 June 2008	September 10, 2010
Victor is informed of Wolf's condition, and that a virus is circulating through the XAT. Al and Brad inspect the new Paladin machines and Brad encounters his old squad member, Clavier. A mysterious outbreak of Amalgams has the Paladin-equipped XAT officers dispatched to a public swimming pool. Later, infected XAT personnel turn into Amalgams and begin to take over XAT headquarters, cutting off communications with the outside world, while Al and Brad free Hermann and Amanda. Clavier and Senger head back to headquarters and are ambushed by Amalgams when they arrive, but Blue emerges and attacks the Amalgams. The surviving XAT operatives are devastated when Wolf reveals that he was instrumental in the infection of XAT staff and the Amalgam outbreak in the city. Beatrice confronts Joseph and tells him that even the Bundeswehr wouldn't be able to defeat Amalgams. Mei-Fong reports back to Victor that most of XAT are dead, forcing Victor to disband the organization while the "Three Knights" are assembled.
12	"Judgment Day"; Transliteration: "Shinpan no hi" (Japanese: 審判の日)	Gen Urobuchi	27 June 2008	September 13, 2010
The remaining XAT troops realize that they are probably infected from drinking contaminated water, except for Hermann and Amanda who were incarcerated. They decide break out and head for the heliport. Wolf announces that all XAT staff are infected and to kill them on sight. Meanwhile Beatrice defeats Joseph, but Xargin arrives and sends her on another mission. Only a few XAT troops make it to the helipad and are confronted by Wolf who and reveals his true purpose and his Blassreiter form. Hermann and Amanda manage to escape in a helicopter, thanks to the remaining XAT troops sacrificing themselves. As they leave, Mei-Fong on board an airborne mecha drops a bomb that destroys XAT headquarters and part of the city to prevent further Amalgam contamination. As their Aérospatiale Puma chopper was damaged during the bomb blast, Hermann gets Amanda to eject before it crashes to the ground and explodes with him still inside.
13	"Distant Memories"; Transliteration: "Tōi kioku" (Japanese: 遠い記憶)	Ai Ota	5 July 2008	September 14, 2010
Amanda and Joseph take refuge in an abandoned church several miles from the deserted city where he grew up. Joseph tells Amanda that he was an orphaned Outsider, a class considered inferior in German society. He endured hardship and experienced discrimination from the upper class due to his heritage, but protected and helped care for the younger children. He even accepted blame for mischievous deeds done by wealthy local children to protect the orphanage. When he was 15 years old, a flood hit the nearby town and the church's priest died while assisting and sheltering refugees. Joseph was distraught at the death of the priest and what he saw as abandonment by God, but was amazed when a young Xargin arrived with humanitarian assistance.
14	"A Saintly Decision"; Transliteration: "Seija no sentaku" (Japanese: 聖者の選択)	Ai Ota	12 July 2008	September 15, 2010
Joseph continues his story, telling Amanda how while Xargin helped people at the church, it was torched by anti-Outsider rioters and Xargin was burned. When visiting Xargin in hospital, Joseph met Sasha who recognised his rosary and told Joseph that they were siblings separated at birth. At the time, Sasha was carrying out bio-engineering research at the university with nanomachines to overcome disease. To help the immigrant refugees displaced by the flood, Xargin and Joseph broke into the university for medicine, but were caught by the guards. Sasha negotiated with director Victor Stachus to have them released. After Sasha's apparent death by anti-Outsider hooligans and the deaths of Outsider children due to lack of medicine, Joseph learned that Victor was using her research to create living weapons. Angry at all the suffering, Xargin used Sasha's research to become a Blassreiter to end suffering in the world. When Joseph was injured trying to stop him, Xargin dropped some of his blood into Joseph's mouth, making him a Blassreiter. Back in the present, Amanda and Joseph are standing in the graveyard then two machines appear, piloted by Mei-Fong and Sasha, who is alive but looks different.
15	"The Millenary Knights of God"; Transliteration: "Kami o tataeru sen nen no kishi" (Japanese: 神を讃える千年の騎士)	Gen Urobuchi	19 July 2008	September 16, 2010
Amanda and Joseph are taken into custody by Mei-Fong and Sasha who are working for a paramilitary organization called Zwölf, known as the Knight Templars in the Middle Ages. Commander Victor Stachus watches as Amanda undergoes Zwölf training while Joseph undergoes surgery to release his latent Blassreiter powers. Amanda learns that Victor and Mei-Fong were loaned to XAT to help fight the Amalgums. Meanwhile, the three Apocalypse Knights are launched by Zwölf after the Bundeswehr and German police couldn't contain the rise of Demoniac outbreaks. Using a particle canon they destroy almost everything and everyone within the targeted radius, then land to finish the task manually. Amanda realizes that, although Zwölf has the solution to destroying the Amalgams, he was also the responsible for their creation. Meanwhile, Wolf tries to make Al, Brad and Lene into Blassreiters by applying transfusions of his own blood.
16	"Reunion"; Transliteration: "Saikai" (Japanese: 再会)	Gen Urobuchi	26 July 2008	September 17, 2010
Amanda learns from Sacha the background to the Zwölf human weapons program. Hermann, now a Demoniac converted by Beatrice, infiltrates the Zwölf castle to rescue Amanda, but she refuses to leave. Meanwhile, Wolf leads a Demoniac force to attack the Zeppelin Air Base in order to draw the Apocalypse Knights into a trap. Above the airbase, Demoniac-manned Eurofighter Typhoons are used to intercept the Knights with Beatrice closing from the opposite direction. Hermann turns to his Blassreiter form and escapes with the 666, an experimental motorcycle, killing Zwölf defense personnel in his wake. Amanda pursues him in her XAT Paladin.
17	"Bellow of the Beast"; Transliteration: "Kemono no hōkō" (Japanese: 獣の咆哮)	Gen Urobuchi	2 August 2008	September 20, 2010
The Apocalypse Knights take on the Demoniac Eurofighter Typhoons and Beatrice and manage to destroy most of the airbase and escape. Meanwhile Amanda confronts Hermann in his Blassreiter form and helps him realize what he is supposed to be fighting for. While the Apocalypse Knights repair the damage and re-engage Beatrice the remaining Demoniac Eurofighter Typhoons, Hermann and Amanda head toward the airbase, to face off against Wolf and his Amalgam cadre that survived the blast.
18	"The Fourth Apocalypse"; Transliteration: "Dai yon no mokushi" (Japanese: 第四の黙示)	Ai Ota	9 August 2008	September 21, 2010
Amanda and Hermann engage Wolf and his Amalgam cadre until Joseph arrives, but he loses control, attacking both friend and foe and the Apocalypse Knights retreat. At the United Nations, the ambassadors are concerned about the inability of German security forces to handle the Amalgams. They agree to take control of the country themselves and send in UN peacekeepers to eliminate the Amalgams. Victor tells the members of the German government that he will continue his own battle to save humankind. While trying to locate Hermann, Amanda encounters a young Blassreiter named Snow.
19	"Quondam Affections"; Transliteration: "Kako kara no omoi" (Japanese: 過去からの想い)	Ai Ota	16 August 2008	September 22, 2010
Snow tells Amanda about her connection with Joseph and goes to talk him out of his berserk state. Hermann and Amanda confront Wolf and the remaining Amalgam cadre at the former besieged XAT Headquarters. At some personal cost and pain, Snow confronts Joseph and helps him regain his humanity. Wolf is almost defeated when a sniper Amalgam Al shoots at the two surviving XAT officers, but seeing his name on Amanda's Paladin brings Al back to his senses and he shoots Wolf instead. Amanda and Hermann then destroy Wolf for good. Afterwards, Al kills himself because he didn't feel that coming back to life was normal.
20	"Legion from the Netherworld"; Transliteration: "Yomi no gunzei" (Japanese: 黄泉(よみ)の軍勢)	Yasuko Kobayashi	30 August 2008	September 23, 2010
A horde of 30,000 Demoniacs head towards Zwölf under the command of Xargin with Beatrice alongside. Victor decides to send Joseph out alone to delay their advance towards Zwölf headquarters. Meanwhile Amanda and Herman gain entry to Zwölf castle in an attempt to rescue Malek. Joseph walks out to meet Xargin and Beatrice, and Beatrice attacks to prove her worth to Xargin. Changing to their Blassreiter forms, they engage in a fierce battle. Joseph wounds Beatrice is about to end her life when Xargin stops Joseph and easily subdues him despite the enhancements ordered by Victor. Xargin enters the castle and meets Sacha.
21	"Phantom Rider"; Transliteration: "Sōhaku no kishu" (Japanese: 蒼白の騎手)	Yasuko Kobayashi	6 September 2008	September 24, 2010
Armed Zwölf defense personnel are mobilized to ward off the Demoniac invasion on Victor's orders. Amanda and Hermann search for Malek within the complex, and find him through a clue left by Shido. Sasha challenges Xargin, but cannot kill him and Xargin proceeds to the main server room. Amanda and Hermann leave with Malek, pick up the unconscious Joseph as they depart and take refuge in a small compound managed by a nun and friend of Shido. Victor heads down to the server room to secure computer data during the invasion, but Xargin reaches the room, and casually defeats him by integrating him into the computer system.
22	"Drifting Hearts"; Transliteration: "Todokanu omoi" (Japanese: 届かぬ想い)	Gen Urobuchi	13 September 2008	September 27, 2010
Sasha hands Amanda the Isis data, which contains the information about anti-nanomachines needed to defeat Xargin's Demoniac forces. Beatrice finds out about Isis, even after the data was deleted at Zwölf. Hermann finds Beatrice and attacks her but she is too powerful, and after defeating him, she goes for Amanda. Hermann calls to Malek who revives from his coma and attacks Beatrice to give Hermann time to fatally wound her before he is defeated. As Hermann dies, he is glad that Malek accepts him as an older brother. Meanwhile, United States Air Force B-2 Spirit bombers are deployed as part of the UN's mission to eliminate the Demoniacs in German soil.
23	"Scorched Earth"; Transliteration: "Gōka no daichi" (Japanese: 劫火の大地)	Gen Urobuchi	20 September 2008	September 28, 2010
Sasha, Mei-Fong and Shido work together to intercept the United States Air Force B-2 Spirit bombers and F-35A fighters and prevent them from conducting a bombing sweep of Germany to clear out all Demoniacs. At Zwölf headquarters, Victor regains consciousness and begins to merge with the electronic systems. Shido, promising that he will not let the United States do to Germany what it did to Japan, declares "no more Nagasakis, no more Hiroshimas") and sacrifices himself by destroying his Sword Rider unit, defeating the last F-35As. Sasha and her Bow Rider shoot down the remaining missile, but Mei-Fong detects ICBMs being fired from a Space weapon. Malek leaves to meet Xargin alone and the two engage each other in their Blassreiter forms. Malek is no match for Xargin and is easily defeated. Joseph, now recovered, arrives and sends Malek back to headquarters with Elea on the GARM motorcycle. After swallowing the Isis pill, Joseph prepares to confront Xargin and the two men prepare to engage one another in their Blassreiter forms.
24	"Promised Land"; Transliteration: "Yakusoku no chi" (Japanese: 約束の地)	Ichiro Itano	27 September 2008	September 29, 2010
Joseph and Xargin engage each other in their Blassreiter forms. Elea convinces Victor to help the only remaining Zwölf personnel, Sasha and Mei-Fong, to counter the ICBMs being fired towards Germany. Although they succeed in intercepting the ICBM attack on Germany, Sasha dies when her Bow Rider explodes from overheating after firing the long range canon and Mei-Fong is killed after engaging a spacecraft above the Earth. Victor finally dies as power to Zwölf headquarters is terminated. Xargin beats Joseph who lapses into unconsciousness. However, first Hermann and then Gerd assist him with their powers by merging with his body, but it is not enough and Xargin still defeats him. As Joseph dies, the Isis anti-nanomachines are released with its particles killing Xargin and immobilizing the Demoniacs. Five years after the events of Blassreiter, Germany has been rebuilt and the federal government reformed a new XAT. Amanda accepts a position as Captain of the Guerrilla Squad and work with Malek to protect people who have turned into Amalgams with the ability to turn to Blassreiters but who now suffer persecution.

== See also ==
- Blassreiter
