= Robert H. Day (judge) =

American judge (1867–1933)

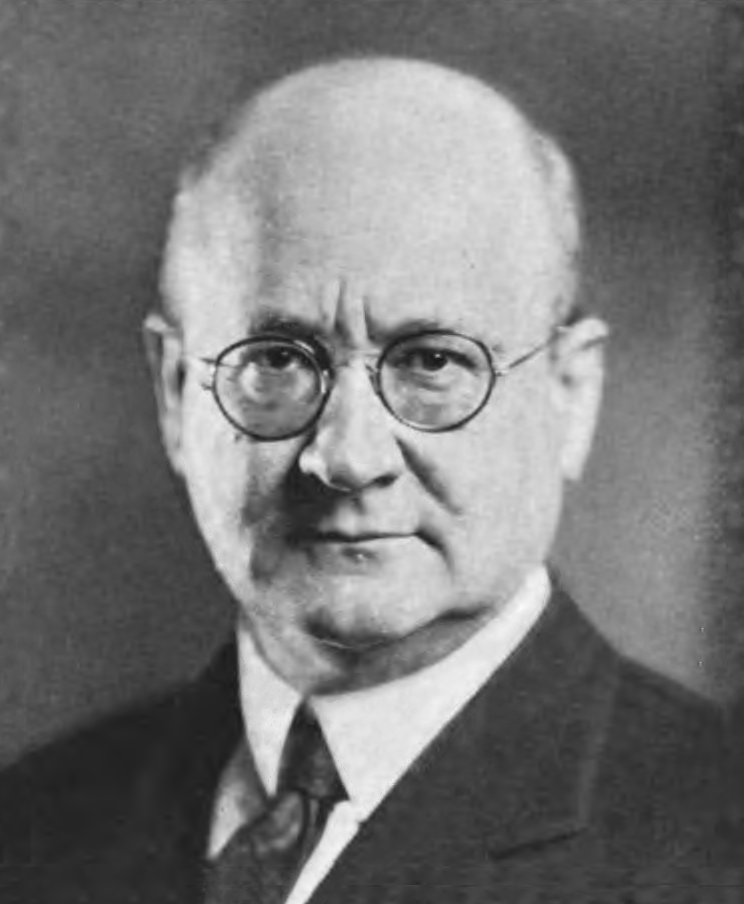

Associate Justice of the Ohio Supreme Court
- In office January 1, 1923 – September 29, 1933
- Preceded by: George H. Clark
- Succeeded by: Charles B. Zimmerman

Personal details
- Born: Robert Henry Day; July 8, 1867 Ravenna, Ohio, U.S.
- Died: September 29, 1933 (aged 66) Columbus, Ohio, U.S.
- Resting place: Ravenna
- Party: Republican
- Spouse: Mary H. Hunt (m. 1898)
- Children: 2
- Parent: Luther Day (father)
- Relatives: William R. Day (half-brother); William Louis Day (half-nephew); Stephen A. Day (half-nephew)
- Education: Western Reserve Academy; University of Michigan; Cincinnati Law School

Robert Henry Day (July 8, 1867 – September 29, 1933) was a Republican lawyer from Massillon, Ohio, United States who served as a judge on the Ohio Supreme Court from 1923 until his death.

== Biography ==
Robert Henry Day was born at Ravenna in Portage County, Ohio to Luther Day and his second wife, Ellen L. Barnes Day. Luther Day was a judge on the Ohio Supreme Court at that time. He attended public schools, and graduated from Western Reserve Academy at Hudson, Ohio in 1884. He attended the University of Michigan for two years and graduated from the Cincinnati Law School in 1891. In June, 1933, the University of Cincinnati awarded him the honorary degree of Doctor of Laws. He was admitted to the bar in Ohio in 1891, and to the U. S. Supreme Court bar in 1898.

Day was a member of the Massillon, Ohio firm Willison & Day 1892–1911. He was Stark County Prosecuting Attorney 1900-1906, and judge of the Stark County Court of Common Pleas starting in 1911. He married Mary H. Hunt, June 27, 1898, and had two daughters. Day served on the Draft Board during World War I.

On November 9, 1922, Robert Day was elected to the Ohio Supreme Court, and was seated January 1, 1923. He was re-elected in November 1928 for another 6-year term. He served until his death in Columbus, Ohio September 29, 1933. Funeral services were held at the Day home in Columbus, and he is buried in Ravenna.

Day's half-brother William R. Day was an Associate Justice of the Supreme Court of the United States from 1903 to 1922.

Legal offices
Preceded by George H. Clark	Ohio Supreme Court Justice; 1923-1933	Succeeded by Charles B. Zimmerman
