= William R. Day =

US Supreme Court justice from 1903 to 1922

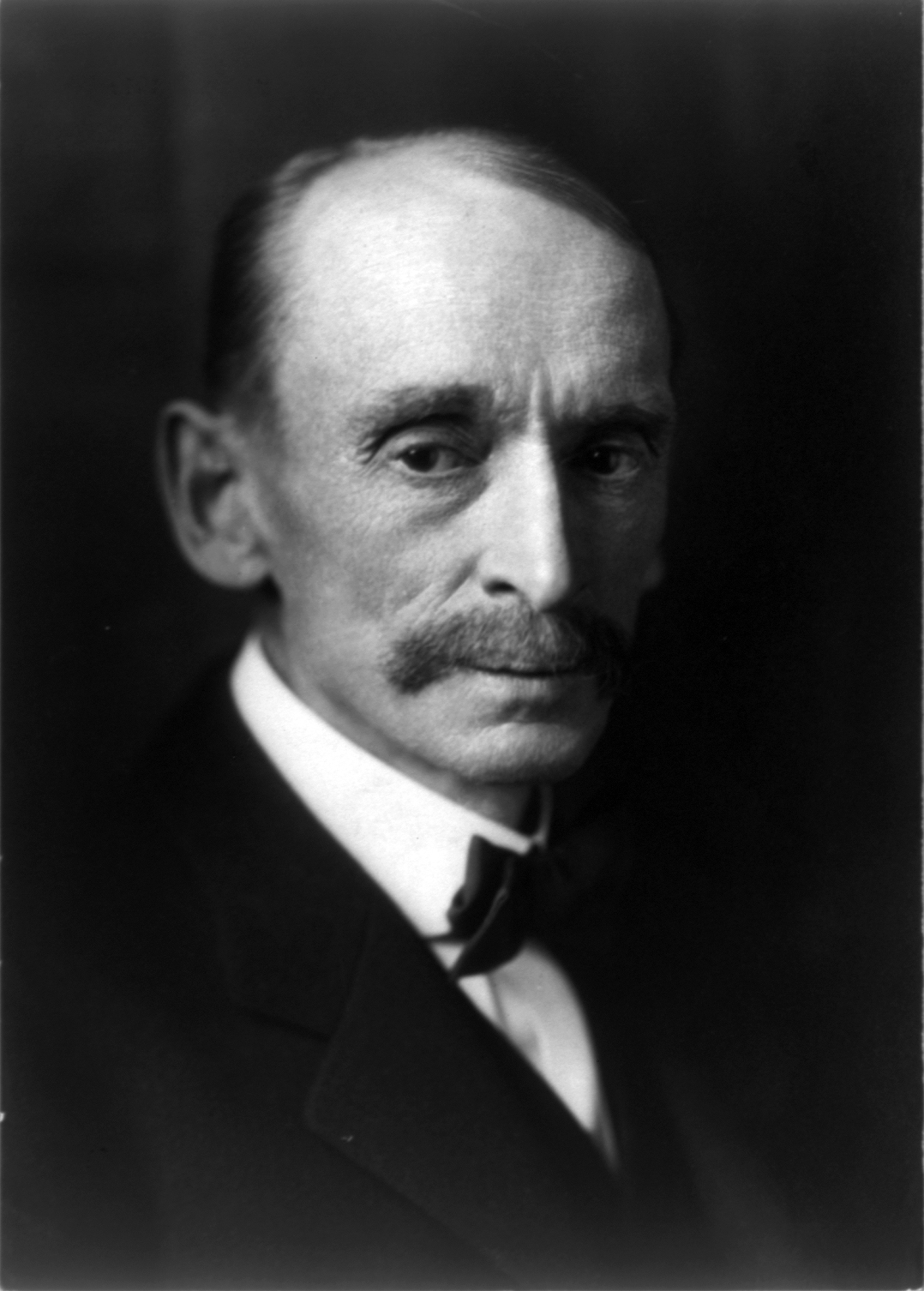
- Day in 1910

Associate Justice of the Supreme Court of the United States
- In office March 2, 1903 – November 13, 1922
- Nominated by: Theodore Roosevelt
- Preceded by: George Shiras Jr.
- Succeeded by: Pierce Butler

Judge of the United States Court of Appeals for the Sixth Circuit and United States Circuit Courts for the Sixth Circuit
- In office February 28, 1899 – February 23, 1903
- Nominated by: William McKinley
- Preceded by: Seat established by 30 Stat. 803
- Succeeded by: John K. Richards

36th United States Secretary of State
- In office April 28, 1898 – September 16, 1898
- President: William McKinley
- Preceded by: John Sherman
- Succeeded by: John Hay

United States Assistant Secretary of State
- In office May 11, 1897 – April 27, 1898
- President: William McKinley
- Preceded by: William Woodville Rockhill
- Succeeded by: John Bassett Moore

Personal details
- Born: William Rufus Day; April 17, 1849 Ravenna, Ohio, U.S.
- Died: July 9, 1923 (aged 74) Mackinac Island, Michigan, U.S.
- Resting place: West Lawn Cemetery
- Party: Republican
- Spouse: Mary Elizabeth Schaefer (m. 1875; died 1912)
- Relations: Robert H. Day (half-brother); Rufus P. Spalding (maternal grandfather); Zephaniah Swift Spalding (uncle); Anna Gunn (great-great-granddaughter)
- Children: 4, including William L. and Stephen A.
- Parent: Luther Day (father)
- Education: University of Michigan (BS)

William Rufus Day (April 17, 1849 – July 9, 1923) was an American diplomat and jurist who served as an associate justice of the Supreme Court of the United States from 1903 to 1922. Prior to his service on the Supreme Court, Day served as United States Secretary of State during the administration of President William McKinley. He also served as a United States circuit judge of the United States Court of Appeals for the Sixth Circuit and the United States Circuit Courts for the Sixth Circuit.

== Early life and career ==
William Rufus Day was born on April 17, 1849, in Ravenna, Ohio, one of the children of Emily (née Spaulding) and Judge Luther Day of the Ohio Supreme Court. His maternal grandfather Rufus P. Spalding was also a judge of the Ohio Supreme Court. He graduated with a Bachelor of Science degree from the University of Michigan in 1870, spent a year studying law with attorney and Judge George F. Robinson, and then a year at the University of Michigan Law School. He was admitted to the bar on July 5, 1872, and settled in Canton, Ohio, where he began practicing law in partnership with William A. Lynch. For twenty-five years, Day worked as a criminal defense and corporate lawyer in the growing industrial town while participating in Republican politics.

During these years, Day became a good friend of William McKinley. Day became McKinley's legal and political adviser during McKinley's candidacies for the Congress, the Governorship of Ohio, and the Presidency of the United States. After he won the Presidency, McKinley appointed Day to be Assistant Secretary of State under Secretary of State John Sherman. Sherman was considered to be ineffective because of declining health and failing memory, and in 1898, President McKinley replaced Sherman with Day.

Five months later, Day vacated his cabinet position to helm the United States Peace Commission formed to negotiate an end to the Spanish–American War with Spain. After the Spanish–American War was declared, Day had argued that the Spanish colonies, other than Cuba, should be returned to Spain, contrary to McKinley's decision that the United States should take over from Spain control of the Philippines, Puerto Rico, and Guam. Day, however, negotiated peace with Spain on McKinley's harsher terms. Day was worried the terms McKinley was insisting on would be "humiliating" to Spain, and for that reason Spain would not agree to them. Ultimately Spain did submit to McKinley's "painfully harsh" terms. His final diplomatic effort was to lead the United States Peace Commission to Paris and sign the treaty ending the war. He was succeeded at the Department of State by John Hay.

== Court of Appeals and Circuit Courts service ==
Day received a recess appointment from President Benjamin Harrison to the United States District Court for the Northern District of Ohio on May 24, 1889, but declined the appointment.

Day was nominated by President William McKinley on February 25, 1899, to the United States Court of Appeals for the Sixth Circuit and the United States Circuit Courts for the Sixth Circuit, to a new joint seat authorized by 30 Stat. 803. He was confirmed by the United States Senate on February 28, 1899, and received his commission the same day. His service terminated on February 23, 1903, due to his elevation to the United States Supreme Court.

== Supreme Court service ==
On February 19, 1903, Day was nominated by President Theodore Roosevelt as an associate justice of the Supreme Court, to succeed George Shiras Jr. Roosevelt had initially offered the position to William Howard Taft, who declined in order to remain in his post as governor of the Philippines. The United States Senate confirmed the nomination on February 23, 1903, and Day took the judicial oath of office on March 2, 1903. He served as Circuit Justice for the Seventh Circuit from March 9, 1903, to March 17, 1912, and as Circuit Justice for the Sixth Circuit from March 18, 1912, to November 13, 1922.

=== Notable cases ===
Day wrote 439 opinions during his tenure on the court, of which only 18 were dissents. He distrusted large corporations and voted with antitrust majorities throughout his time on the court. He sided with the government in the Standard Oil, American Tobacco, and Union Pacific cases in 1911 and 1912 and again in the Southern Pacific case in 1922.

Day delivered the opinion of the Court in Weeks v. United States, where the highest Court ruled that the warrantless seizure of documents from a private home violated the Fourth Amendment prohibition against unreasonable searches and seizures, and evidence obtained in this manner is excluded from use in federal criminal prosecutions.

After the death of Chief Justice Edward Douglass White, Day proposed to President (and fellow Ohioan) Warren G. Harding a plan to crown his legal career by appointing him chief justice and serve for six months before retiring and letting former president William Howard Taft become chief justice. Harding considered the proposal but Taft felt, when he learned of this plan, that a short-term appointment would not serve the office well, and that once confirmed by the Senate, the memory of Day would grow dim.

=== Baseball ===
Day was an avid baseball fan. He would often leave the Court after oral argument and go straight to Boundary Field to watch the Washington Senators play. Day is recorded as asking his clerk for "regular updates" during the bench hearing of Standard Sanitary Mfg. Co. v. United States about the final game of the 1912 World Series.

== Retirement and death ==
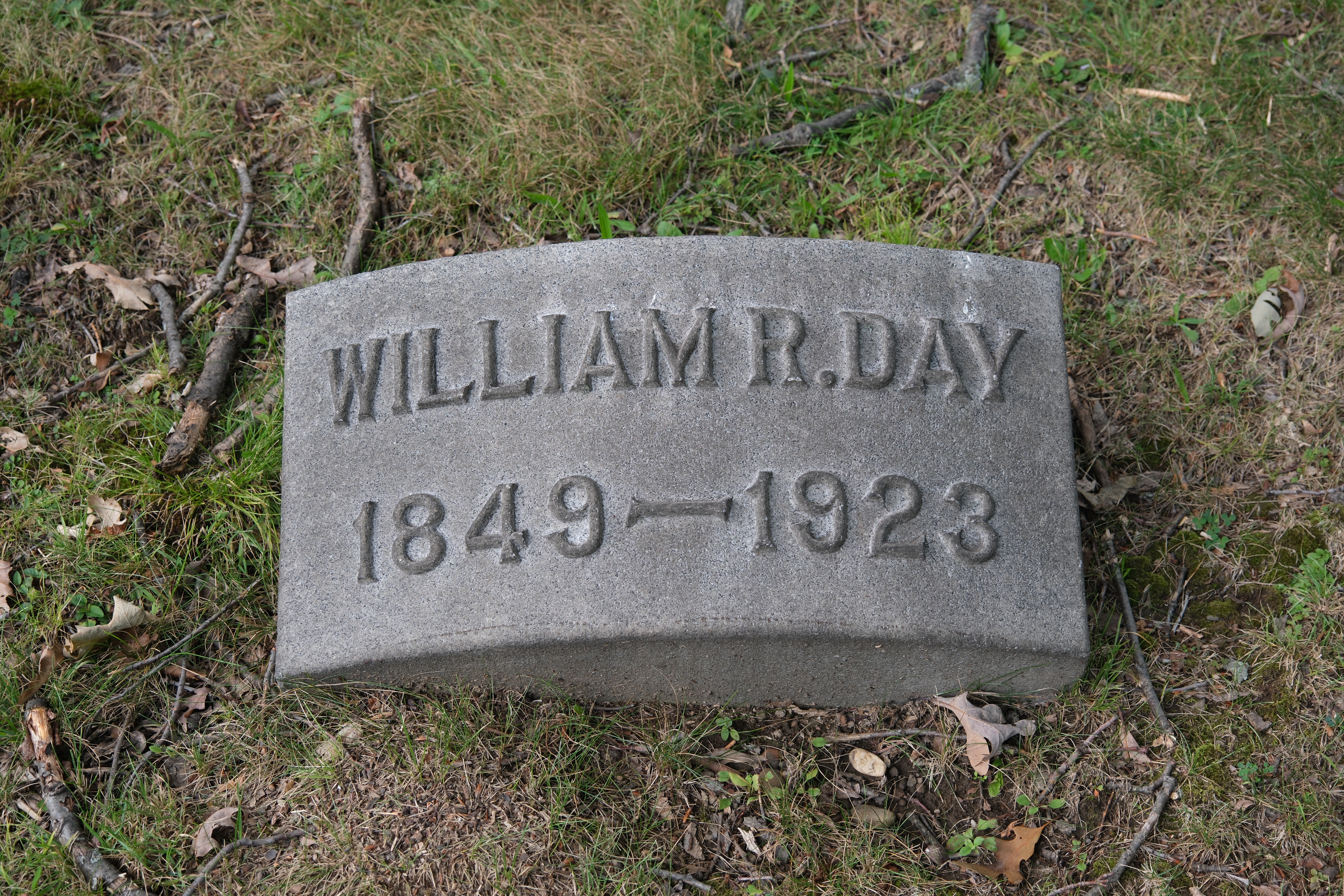
Grave of Day at West Lawn Cemetery

Day retired from the court on November 13, 1922, and briefly served as an Umpire of the Mixed Claims Commission to Adjudicate War Claims against Germany. He died on July 9, 1923, in his home in the Annex (now named Day Cottage) on Mackinac Island in Michigan, aged 74. He was interred at West Lawn Cemetery in Canton.

== Personal life ==
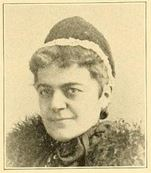
Mary Elizabeth Schaefer

Day married Mary Elizabeth Schaefer, daughter of Louis Schaefer, of Canton on August 24, 1875. They were married until her death in 1912, and were the parents of four sons: William L., Rufus S., Stephen A., and Luther. His sons were appellate lawyers who litigated cases before the Supreme Court. Through his son Luther, he is the great-great grandfather of the actress Anna Gunn.

== Selected opinions authored by Day ==
- Ware & Leland v. Mobile County, 209 U.S. 405 (1908) – held that contracts for the sales of cotton for future delivery that do not oblige interstate shipments are not subjects of interstate commerce
- Bobbs-Merrill Co. v. Straus, 210 U.S. 339 (1908) – helped establish "first-sale doctrine" in United States copyright law
- Muskrat v. United States, 219 U.S. 346 (1911) – held that there must be an actual controversy between parties for the Federal courts to have jurisdiction
- Flint v. Stone Tracy Co., 220 U.S. 107 (1911) – held privilege of operating in corporate form justifies imposition of an income tax
- Bauer & Cie. v. O'Donnell, 229 U.S. 1 (1913) – held that patent rights could not be extended by the holder by means of a licensing agreement
- Weeks v. United States, 232 U.S. 383 (1914) – held that exclusionary rule is applicable to the federal government for violations of the Fourth Amendment
- Buchanan v. Warley, 245 U.S. 60 (1917) – held that municipal ordinances segregating neighborhoods were unconstitutional
- Hammer v. Dagenhart, 247 U.S. 251 (1918) – held that laws regulating child labor are beyond the scope of Congress's constitutional power under the commerce clause
- Hawke v. Smith, 253 U.S. 221 (1920) – held that a state referendum could not rescind its legislative ratification of a federal constitutional amendment after that amendment had passed.

== See also ==
- List of justices of the Supreme Court of the United States

== Sources ==
- McLean, Joseph E. (1946). William Rufus Day: Supreme Court Justice from Ohio. The Johns Hopkins University Studies in Historical and Political Science. Vol. 64. Baltimore, MD: Johns Hopkins Press. LCCN 47011230.
- Sears, Louis Martin (1928). "William Rufus Day". In Bemis, Samuel Flagg (ed.). The American Secretaries of State and Their Diplomacy. Vol. IX. New York: Cooper Square Publishers.

Political offices
Preceded by William Woodville Rockhill	United States Assistant Secretary of State; 1897–1898	Succeeded by John Bassett Moore
Preceded by John Sherman	United States Secretary of State; 1898	Succeeded by John Hay
Legal offices
Preceded by Seat established by 30 Stat. 803	Judge of the United States Circuit Courts for the Sixth Circuit; 1899–1903	Succeeded by John K. Richards
Preceded by Seat established by 30 Stat. 803	Judge of the United States Court of Appeals for the Sixth Circuit; 1899–1903	Succeeded by John K. Richards
Preceded by George Shiras Jr.	Associate Justice of the Supreme Court of the United States; 1903–1922	Succeeded by Pierce Butler
