= Ohio Supreme Court elections =

American elections

Seal of the Supreme Court of Ohio

The U.S. state of Ohio has a Supreme Court of seven members, who are elected for six-year terms.

== Chief Justice of the Ohio Supreme Court ==
Six-year term beginning Jan. 1: 1945, 1951, 1957, 1963, 1969, 1975, 1981, 1987, 1993, 1999, 2005, etc.
Elections scheduled: 1944, 1950, 1956, 1962, 1968, 1974, 1980, 1986, 1992, 1998, 2004, etc. (s = Special election held to fill the seat of a justice who did not complete a term.) BOLD TYPE indicates winning candidate

Year	Democrat	Republican	Other
2016		Maureen O'Connor : 3,562,413	
2010	Eric Brown : 1,070,690	Maureen O'Connor : 2,232,724	
2004	C. Ellen Connally:2,017,602	Thomas J. Moyer: 2,309,107	
1998	Gary Tyack	Thomas J. Moyer	
1992	Robert H. Gorman	Thomas J. Moyer	
1986	Frank D. Celebrezze	Thomas J. Moyer	
1980	Frank D. Celebrezze	Sara J. Harper	
1978 s	Frank D. Celebrezze	Thomas M. Herbert	
1974	Joseph E. O'Neill	C. William O'Neill	
1970 s	William C. Bryant	C. William O'Neill	
1968	John C. Duffy	Kingsley A. Taft	
1962	Carl V. Weygandt	Kingsley A. Taft	
1956	Carl V. Weygandt	Willard D. Campbell	
1950	Carl V. Weygandt	Francis B. Douglass	
1944	Carl V. Weygandt	Walter B. Wanamaker	
1932	Carl V. Weygandt	Carrington T. Marshall	
1920	Hugh L. Nichols	Carrington T. Marshall	

== Candidates for Ohio Supreme Court Justice (1) ==
Six-year term beginning Jan. 1: 1945, 1951, 1957, 1963, 1969, 1975, 1981, 1987, 1993, 1999, 2005, etc.
Elections scheduled: 1944, 1950, 1956, 1962, 1968, 1974, 1980, 1986, 1992, 1998, 2004, etc. (s = Special election held to fill the seat of a justice who did not complete a term.) BOLD TYPE indicates winning candidate

Year	Democrat	Republican	Other
2016	John P. O'Donnell : 2,022,514	Pat Fischer : 2,044,984	
2010	Mary Jane Trapp : 1,315,105	Judith Ann Lanzinger : 1,717,889	
2004	Nancy A. Fuerst: 1,838,137	Judith Ann Lanzinger: 2,443,514	
1998	Francis E. Sweeney Sr.: 1,677,791	Stephen W. Powell: 1,049,561	
1992	Francis E. Sweeney Sr.: 2,008,854	Mark P. Painter: 1,838,307	
1986	Francis E. Sweeney Sr.: 1,293,364	Robert E. Holmes: 1,326,736	
1980	Lawrence Grey: 870,736	Robert E. Holmes: 2,115,743	
1974	Frank D. Celebrezze	Sheldon A. Taft	
1972 s	Frank D. Celebrezze	Robert E. Leach	
1970 s		Robert M. Duncan	
1968		John M. Matthias	
1962	James J. Mayer	John M. Matthias	
1956	Merrill D. Brother	John M. Matthias	
1954 s	John H. Lamneck	John M. Matthias	
1950	Charles H. Hubbell	Edward S. Matthias	
1944	Charles H. Hubbell	Edward S. Matthias	

== Candidates for Ohio Supreme Court Justice (2) ==
Six-year term beginning Jan. 2: 1945, 1951, 1957, 1963, 1969, 1975, 1981, 1987, 1993, 1999, 2005, etc.
Elections scheduled: 1944, 1950, 1956, 1962, 1968, 1974, 1980, 1986, 1992, 1998, 2004, etc. (s = Special election held to fill the seat of a justice who did not complete a term.) BOLD TYPE indicates winning candidate

Year	Democrat	Republican	Other
2016	Cynthia Rice : 1,892,450	Pat DeWine : 2,438,641	
2010		Paul Pfeifer : 2,384,122	
2004		Paul E. Pfeifer: 3,384,192	
1998	Ronald Suster: 781,103	Paul E. Pfeifer: 1,947,916	
1992	John T. Patton: 1,785,215	Paul E. Pfeifer: 2,015,685	
1986	Herbert R. Brown: 1,328,913	Joyce J. George: 1,306,049	
1980	Clifford F. Brown: 1,563,665	David D. Dowd, Jr.: 1,528,071	
1974	Clifford F. Brown	Thomas M. Herbert	
1968	Merrill D. Brother	Thomas M. Herbert	
1962	Richard T. Cole	Paul M. Herbert	
1956	Evan P. Ford	Thomas J. Herbert	
1950		William L. Hart	James Metzenbaum
1944	Herbert S. Duffy	William L. Hart	

== Candidates for Ohio Supreme Court Justice (3) ==
Six-year term beginning Jan. 1: 1941, 1947, 1953, 1959, 1965, 1971, 1977, 1983, 1989, 1995, 2001, etc.
Elections scheduled: 1940, 1946, 1952, 1958, 1964, 1970, 1976, 1982, 1988, 1994, 2000, etc. (s = Special election held to fill the seat of a justice who did not complete a term.) BOLD TYPE indicates winning candidate

Year	Democrat	Republican	Other			
2024	Michael P. Donnelly: 2,415,507	Megan E. Shanahan: 3,025,884	-	2018	Michael P. Donnelly: 2,116,136	Craig Baldwin: 1,352,859
2012	Michael J. Skindell : 1,252,688	Terrence O'Donnell : 2,804,629				
2006	William M. O'Neill: 1,341,258	Terrence O'Donnell: 1,903,702				
2004 s	William M. O'Neill: 1,635,718	Terrence O'Donnell: 2,496,863				
2000	Timothy Black: 1,869,060	Deborah L. Cook: 2,014,274				
1994	J. Ross Haffey: 864,786	Deborah L. Cook: 1,842,063				
1988	A. William Sweeney: 2,059,402	Paul R. Matia: 1,492,256				
1982	A. William Sweeney: 1,564,495	John W. McCormac: 1,148,239				
1976	A. William Sweeney	Don P. Brown				
1970	Allen Brown	J. J. P. Corrigan				
1964	Charles B. Zimmerman	Francis B. Douglass				
1958	Charles B. Zimmerman	Willard D. Campbell				
1952	Charles B. Zimmerman	Francis B. Douglass				
1946	Charles B. Zimmerman	Clinton DeWitt Boyd				
1940	Charles B. Zimmerman	Clinton DeWitt Boyd				

== Candidates for Ohio Supreme Court Justice (4) ==
Six-year term beginning Jan. 2: 1941, 1947, 1953, 1959, 1965, 1971, 1977, 1983, 1989, 1995, 2001, etc.
Elections scheduled: 1940, 1946, 1952, 1958, 1964, 1970, 1976, 1982, 1988, 1994, 2000, etc. (s = Special election held to fill the seat of a justice who did not complete a term.) BOLD TYPE indicates winning candidate

Year	Democrat	Republican	Other
2024	Melody J. Stewart : 2,443,066	Joe Deters : 2,997,144	
2018	Melody J. Stewart : 1,803,277	Mary DeGenaro : 1,630,977	
2012	William O'Neill : 2,115,841	Robert Cupp : 1,912,850	
2006	Ben Espy: 1,505,255	Robert R. Cupp: 1,712,584	
2000	Alice Robie Resnick: 2,312,073	Terrence O'Donnell: 1,740,516	
1994	Alice Robie Resnick: 1,645,061	Sara J. Harper: 1,144,143	
1988	Alice Robie Resnick: 1,917,510	Joyce J. George: 1,688,281	
1982	Ralph S. Locher: 1,437,584	William J. McCrone: 1,129,675	
1976	Ralph S. Locher	William J. Morrissey	
1970		Leonard J. Stern	
1964	Joseph D. Bryan	C. William O'Neill	
1960 s	John W. Peck	C. William O'Neill	
1958	Merrill D. Brother	James Garfield Stewart	
1952	Kenneth B. Johnston	James Garfield Stewart	
1948 s		James Garfield Stewart	
1946	Herbert S. Duffy	Charles S. Bell	
1942 s	T. J. Duffy	Charles S. Bell	
1940	Judge MacBride	Gilbert Bettman	Arthur H. Day

== Candidates for Ohio Supreme Court Justice (5) ==
Six-year term beginning Jan. 1: 1943, 1949, 1955, 1961, 1967, 1973, 1979, 1985, 1991, 1997, 2003, etc.
Elections scheduled: 1942, 1948, 1954, 1960, 1966, 1972, 1978, 1984, 1990, 1996, 2002, etc. (s = Special election held to fill the seat of a justice who did not complete a term.) BOLD TYPE indicates winning candidate

Year	Democrat	Republican	Other
2024 s	Lisa Forbes: 2,456,462	Daniel R. Hawkins: 2,998,592	
2020	John P. O'Donnell: 2,231,724	Sharon L. Kennedy: 2,735,041	
2014	Tom Letson: 692,030	Sharon L. Kennedy: 1,828,156	
2012 s	Yvette McGee Brown: 1,769,123	Sharon L. Kennedy: 2,347,925	
2008	Joseph Russo: 1,453,784	Maureen O'Connor: 2,970,588	
2002	Timothy Black: 1,276,497	Maureen O'Connor: 1,709,673	
1996	Peter M. Sikora: 1,138,106	Andrew Douglas: 2,230,601	
1990	Stuart J. Banks: 756,481	Andrew Douglas: 2,013,630	
1984	John E. Corrigan: 1,680,859	Andrew Douglas: 1,893,299	
1978	William B. Brown	Richard M. Markus	
1972	William B. Brown	Louis J. Schneider, Jr.	
1966	Clifford F. Brown	Louis J. Schneider, Jr.	
1964 s	Lynn B. Griffith	Louis J. Schneider, Jr.	
1960	James F. Bell	Earl R. Hoover	
1954	James F. Bell	Henry A. Middleton	
1950 s		Henry A. Middleton	W. H. Annat; Ralph Bartlett; Fred Dewey; Arthur W. Doyle; Dennis Dunlavy; Howard E. Faught; Martin L. Sweeney
1948	Charles H. Hubbell	Edward C. Turner	
1942	William C. Dixon	Roy H. Williams	
1936	Will P. Stephenson	Roy H. Williams	
1934 s	Howard Landis Bevis	Roy H. Williams	

== Candidates for Ohio Supreme Court Justice (6) ==
Six-year term beginning Jan. 2: 1943, 1949, 1955, 1961, 1967, 1973, 1979, 1985, 1991, 1997, 2003, etc.
Elections scheduled: 1942, 1948, 1954, 1960, 1966, 1972, 1978, 1984, 1990, 1996, 2002, etc. (s = Special election held to fill the seat of a justice who did not complete a term.) BOLD TYPE indicates winning candidate

Year	Democrat	Republican	Other
2020	Jennifer Brunner: 2,695,072	Judith L. French: 2,174,820	
2014	John P. O'Donnell: 1,132,759	Judith L. French: 1,438,283	
2008	Peter Sikora: 1,554,521	Evelyn Lundberg Stratton: 2,664,137	
2002	Janet Burnside: 1,290,412	Evelyn Lundberg Stratton: 1,599,165	
1996	Marianna Brown Bettman: 1,427,947	Evelyn Lundberg Stratton: 2,016,264	
1990	Stephanie Tubbs Jones: 1,255,556	J. Craig Wright: 1,319,422	J. Ross Haffey: 283,883
1984	James P. Celebrezze: 1,765,509	J. Craig Wright: 2,116,080	
1982 s	James P. Celebrezze: 1,617,247	Blanche Krupansky: 1,301,423	
1978	Clifford F. Brown	Paul W. Brown	
1972	Lloyd O. Brown	Paul W. Brown	
1966	Joseph D. Bryan	Paul W. Brown	
1964 s	Rankin M. Gibson	Paul W. Brown	
1960	Joseph H. Ellison	Kingsley A. Taft	
1954		Kingsley A. Taft	
1948	Robert M. Sohngen	Kingsley A. Taft	
1942	Willis Woehrle Metcalf	Edward C. Turner	

== First Constitution of Ohio (1803–1851) ==
Under the first constitution, joint sessions of the legislature elected judges to seven-year terms. Elections were generally in January, with judges seated in February. The state had three or four judges through this period.

== Second Constitution of Ohio (1851–1912) ==
Under the second constitution, five judges were elected to five-year terms, with one seat elected each autumn. The first election was autumn of 1851, with the top five candidates assigned terms by lot. Chief Justice was not voted separately, but chosen by other means. Change of law added a sixth judge for the 1892 election, with term starting February 1893, and terms were increased to six years. No elections were held in 1906 or 1907, when the state transitioned to electing two judges each in even numbered years and terms of sitting judges were extended to fit the new schedule.

Candidates for first election, October 1851:

Name	Party	Votes	Term Expired
William B. Caldwell	Democrat	161,150	1853
Rufus P. Ranney	Democrat	160,984	1857
Allen G. Thurman	Democrat	147,724	1856
Thomas Welles Bartley	Democrat	145,370	1854
John A. Corwin	Democrat	145,099	1855
Sherlock James Andrews	Whig	134,824	
Charles Cleveland Convers	Whig	119,475	
Peter Odlin	Whig	119,503	
Bellamy Storer	Whig	135,946	
George B. Way	Whig	119,000	
Jacob Brinkerhoff	Free Soil	16,143	

== Candidates for Ohio Supreme Court Judge (1) ==
Five-year term beginning February: 1857, 1862, 1867, 1872, 1877, 1882, 1887, 1892, 1897
Elections scheduled: 1856, 1861, 1866, 1871, 1876, 1881, 1886, 1891, 1896 (s = Special election held to fill the seat of a justice who did not complete a term.) BOLD TYPE indicates winning candidate

Year	Democrat	Republican	Other
1856	Rufus P. Ranney : 156,438	Josiah Scott : 175,8181	Daniel Peck (Amer) : 23,868
1861	Thomas J. S. Smith : 151,987	Josiah Scott : 207,443	
1866	Thomas M. Key : 213,612	Josiah Scott : 256,263	
1871	George W. Geddes : 217,374	William H. West : 237,472	
1873 s	Charles H. Scribner : 213,551	Walter F. Stone : 214,363	
1874 s	George Rex : 238,307	William Wartenbee Johnson : 221,182	
1876	William E. Finck : 309,933	Washington W. Boynton : 318,772	
1881	Edward F. Bingham : 286,650	Nicholas Longworth II : 316,005	
1886	Martin Dewey Follett : 326,227	Marshall Jay Williams : 343,739	
1891	Gustavus H. Wald : 345,374	Marshall Jay Williams : 373,433	
1896	Everett D. Stark : 473,094	Marshall Jay Williams : 525,084	
1902	Michael Donnelly	William B. Crew	

== Candidates for Ohio Supreme Court Judge (2) ==
Five-year term beginning February: 1856, 1861, 1866, 1871, 1876, 1881, 1886, 1891, 1896
Elections scheduled: 1855, 1860, 1865, 1870, 1875, 1880, 1885, 1890, 1895 (s = Special election held to fill the seat of a justice who did not complete a term.) BOLD TYPE indicates winning candidate

Year	Democrat	Republican	Other
1855	William Kennon, Sr. : 134,173	Jacob Brinkerhoff : 168,436	
1860	Thomas J. S. Smith : 199,850	Jacob Brinkerhoff : 212,854	
1865	Philadelph Van Trump : 193,284	Jacob Brinkerhoff : 224,958	
1870	Richard A. Harrison : 204,287	George W. McIlvaine : 229,629	Gideon T. Stewart (Pro) : 2,810
1875	Thomas Q. Ashburn : 292,328	George W. McIlvaine : 296,944	
1880	Martin Dewey Follett : 340,998	George W. McIlvaine : 364,045	
1885	Charles D. Martin : 341,712	Thaddeus A. Minshall : 361,216	
1890	George B. Okey : 353,628	Thaddeus A. Minshall : 362,896	
1895	William T. Mooney : 328,970	Thaddeus A. Minshall : 427,809	
1901	Joseph Hiddy	James Latimer Price	

== Candidates for Ohio Supreme Court Judge (3) ==
Five-year term beginning February: 1855, 1860, 1865, 1870, 1875, 1880, 1885, 1890, 1895
Elections scheduled: 1854, 1859, 1864, 1869, 1874, 1879, 1884, 1889, 1894 (s = Special election held to fill the seat of a justice who did not complete a term.) BOLD TYPE indicates winning candidate

Year	Democrat	Republican	Other
1854	Shepherd F. Norris : 109,075	Joseph Rockwell Swan : 188,498	
1859	Henry C. Whitman : 170,895	William Y. Gholson : 182,888	
1864	Philadelph Van Trump	Luther Day	
1869	William J. Gilmore : 228,523	Luther Day : 236,300	
1874	William J. Gilmore : 237,556	Luther Day : 221,701	
1879	William J. Gilmore : 316,994	William Wartenbee Johnson : 336,009	
1884	Charles D. Martin : 378,965	William Wartenbee Johnson : 392,918	
1887 s	Virgil P. Kline : 328,137	Franklin J. Dickman : 357,039	
1889	Martin Dewey Follett : 373,895	Franklin J. Dickman : 376,649	
1894	James D. Ermston : 274,635	John Allen Shauck : 410,011	
1900	Allen Smalley : 474,138	John Allen Shauck : 543,418	Lambertis B. Logan : (Union Reform) : 4,561; E. Jay Pinney (Prohibition) : 9,898; Daniel W. Wallace (Soc Lab) : 1,690; Albert Corbin (Soc Dem) : 4,628

== Candidates for Ohio Supreme Court Judge (4) ==
Five-year term beginning February: 1854, 1859, 1864, 1869, 1874, 1879, 1884, 1889, 1894
Elections scheduled: 1853, 1858, 1863, 1868, 1873, 1878, 1883, 1888, 1893 (s = Special election held to fill the seat of a justice who did not complete a term.) BOLD TYPE indicates winning candidate

Year	Democrat	Republican	Other
1853	Thomas Welles Bartley	unknown	
1858	Thomas Welles Bartley : 162,610	William Virgil Peck : 182,942	
1863	Philadelph Van Trump : 190,992	Hocking H. Hunter : 287,507	
1864 s	Philadelph Van Trump	William White	
1868	William E. Finck	William White	
1873	Henry C. Whitman : 213,705	William White : 214,333	
1878	Alexander F. Hume : 270,839	William White : 274,337	Chilton A. White (NGL) : 38,033; William F. Ross (Pro) : 5,607
1883	Selwyn N. Owen : 360,295	John H. Doyle : 347,091	
1888	Lyman R. Critchfield : 396,236	Joseph Perry Bradbury : 415,842	
1893	John W. Sater : 346,823	Joseph Perry Bradbury : 422,256	
1899	De Witt C. Badger	William Z. Davis	
1905	Hugh T. Mathers : 417,420	William Z. Davis : 462,115	Elihu J. Zeigler (Socialist) : 18,233; James Sterling (Pro) : 13,785; Max Eisenberg (Soc Lab) : 1,821

== Candidates for Ohio Supreme Court Judge (5) ==
Five-year term beginning February: 1853, 1858, 1863, 1868, 1873, 1878, 1883, 1888, 1893
Elections scheduled: 1852, 1857, 1862, 1867, 1872, 1877, 1882, 1887, 1892 (s = Special election held to fill the seat of a justice who did not complete a term.) BOLD TYPE indicates winning candidate

Year	Democrat	Republican	Other
1852	William B. Caldwell : 147,976	Milton Sutliff (Freesoil) : 22,518	Daniel A. Haynes (Whig) : 130,507
1855 s	Robert B. Warden : 132,039	Charles Cleveland Convers : 169,555	
1856 s	Carrington W. Seal : 156,604	Ozias Bowen : 175,892	Samuel Brush (American) : 23,329
1857	Henry C. Whitman : 159,103	Milton Sutliff : 160,342	
1862	Rufus P. Ranney : 185,078	Franklin T. Backus : 178,115	
1865 s	Thomas M. Key : 193,422	John Welch : 225,182	
1867	Thomas M. Key : 240,941	John Welch : 243,480	
1872	John L. Green : 252,036	John Welch : 263,223	
1877	John W. Okey : 271,393	William Wartenbee Johnson : 251,758	
1882	John W. Okey : 315,753	John H. Doyle : 299,389	
1885 s	Gibson Atherton : 335,383	William T. Spear : 363,770	
1887	Lyman R. Critchfield : 327,887	William T. Spear : 357,137	
1892	John B. Driggs : 400,953	William T. Spear : 402,932	
1898	Hugh L. Nichols : 345,883	William T. Spear : 408,879	Mahlon Rouch (Prohibition) : 7,597; Daniel L. Wallace (Soc Lab) : 5,787; Arthur A. Brown (Union Reform) : 10,550
1904	Phillip J. Renner : 357,331	William T. Spear : 587,448	George L. Case (Pro) : 19,239; Harry Lavin (Socialist) : 33,507; Edward Polster (Soc Lab) : 2,502; Osmon S. Ferris (Peoples) : 1,080

== Candidates for Ohio Supreme Court Judge (6) ==
Five-year term beginning February: 1893, six-year terms beginning 1898, 1904
Elections scheduled: 1892, 1897, 1903 (s = Special election held to fill the seat of a justice who did not complete a term.) BOLD TYPE indicates winning candidate

Year	Democrat	Republican	Other
1892	Thomas Beer : 401,048	Jacob F. Burket : 402,847	
1897	J. P. Spriggs	Jacob F. Burket	
1903	Edward J. Dempsey : 358,898	Augustus N. Summers : 471,742	Jeremiah C. Cavanaugh (Socialist) : 14,041; E. Jay Pinney (Pro) : 13,493; Francis Henry (Soc Lab) : 2,152
