= William B. Brown =

American judge

William Burbridge Brown

Associate Justice of the Ohio Supreme Court
- In office January 1, 1973 – December 31, 1984
- Preceded by: Louis J. Schneider, Jr.
- Succeeded by: Andrew Douglas

Personal details
- Born: September 10, 1912 Chillicothe, Ohio
- Died: December 24, 1985 (aged 73) Chillicothe, Ohio
- Resting place: Grandview Cemetery (Chillicothe, Ohio)
- Party: Democratic
- Spouse: Jayne Stone
- Children: Susan Brown Eshbaugh Henry Renick Brown II
- Education: Williams College; Harvard Law School

William Burbridge Brown (10 September 1912, in Chillicothe, Ohio – 24 December 1985), was a lawyer who served a variety of positions in the Territory of Hawaii from 1943 to 1955, before returning to serve on the Ohio District Courts of Appeals and Ohio Supreme Court from 1960 to 1984.

William Burbridge Brown was born to Mabel R. Downs Brown and Dr. Henry Renick Brown. He attended the Chillicothe public schools, received a bachelor's degree from Williams College in 1934, and a law degree from Harvard Law School in 1937. He was admitted to the Ohio bar in 1938, and practiced that year in Toledo, before returning to Chillicothe in 1939 at the firm Simpson and Brown.

Brown left Chillicothe in 1942 to work in Washington, D.C. as a lawyer for the Office of Price Administration. He transferred to Honolulu, Hawaii in 1943, and worked for the Office of Price Administration there until 1946. In 1946, President Harry Truman appointed Brown to the Territory of Hawaii Court of Tax Appeals, and in 1947, Truman appointed him Hawaii Territory Treasurer. In 1951, the President appointed him to the Second Circuit Court for the Territory of Hawaii.

Brown returned to Chillicothe in 1955, and practiced privately for a year. In 1956, he began a four-year term as Chillicothi Municipal Court Judge. In 1960, he won a seat on the 4th District Courts of Appeals of Ohio. He was the first Democrat elected to a seat in the 4th District.

In 1972, Brown defeated incumbent Republican justice Louis J. Schneider, Jr. for a six-year term on the Ohio Supreme Court. In 1978, he won another term. In 1984, Brown was already more than seventy years old, and was prohibited by state law from running for another term. His term ended December 31, 1984.

William B. Brown married Jayne Stone on August 18, 1943. They had two children, Susan and Renny. The couple planned to travel in retirement, but William B. Brown suffered a fatal stroke as a consequence of brain cancer. His funeral was at St. Paul Episcopal Church in Chillicothe, and he was buried at Grandview Cemetery.

After Brown's death, justice J. Craig Wright said : "He was one of the best legal minds we've had on the court in the last twenty years. He was a forward-looking person. He kept the best of the past in his decisions along with the best of what we have now. I admired him."

Justices of the Ohio Supreme Court 1973-1984
year	Chief Justice	Justice (1)	Justice (2)	Justice (3)	Justice (4)	Justice (5)	Justice (6)
1973	C. William O'Neill; 4/2/1970-8/20/1978	Frank Celebrezze; 12/8/1972-12/10/1978	Thomas M. Herbert; 1/1969-7/31/1980	J. J. P. Corrigan; 9/1969-12/1976	Leonard J. Stern; 8/1970-1//1/1977	William B. Brown; 1/1/1973-12/31/1984	Lloyd O. Brown; 12/1971-1/1/1973
1973	C. William O'Neill; 4/2/1970-8/20/1978	Frank Celebrezze; 12/8/1972-12/10/1978	Thomas M. Herbert; 1/1969-7/31/1980	J. J. P. Corrigan; 9/1969-12/1976	Leonard J. Stern; 8/1970-1//1/1977	William B. Brown; 1/1/1973-12/31/1984	Paul W. Brown; 1/1973-8/31/1981
1974	C. William O'Neill	Frank D. Celebrezze	Thomas M. Herbert	J. J. P. Corrigan	Leonard J. Stern	William B. Brown	Paul W. Brown
1975	C. William O'Neill	Frank D. Celebrezze	Thomas M. Herbert	J. J. P. Corrigan	Leonard J. Stern	William B. Brown	Paul W. Brown
1976	C. William O'Neill	Frank D. Celebrezze	Thomas M. Herbert	J. J. P. Corrigan	Leonard J. Stern	William B. Brown	Paul W. Brown
1977	C. William O'Neill	Frank D. Celebrezze	Thomas M. Herbert	A. William Sweeney; 1/1/1977-12/31/1994	Leonard J. Stern	William B. Brown	Paul W. Brown
1977	C. William O'Neill	Frank D. Celebrezze	Thomas M. Herbert	A. William Sweeney; 1/1/1977-12/31/1994	Ralph S. Locher; 1/2/1977-1/1/1989	William B. Brown	Paul W. Brown
1978	C. William O'Neill	Frank D. Celebrezze	Thomas M. Herbert	A. William Sweeney	Ralph S. Locher	William B. Brown	Paul W. Brown
1978	Robert E. Leach; 8/21/1978-12/10/1978	Frank D. Celebrezze	Thomas M. Herbert	A. William Sweeney	Ralph S. Locher	William B. Brown	Paul W. Brown
1978	Frank Celebrezze; 12/11/1978-12/31/1986	Robert E. Holmes; 12/11/1978-12/31/1992	Thomas M. Herbert	A. William Sweeney	Ralph S. Locher	William B. Brown	Paul W. Brown
1979	Frank D. Celebrezze	Robert E. Holmes	Thomas M. Herbert	A. William Sweeney	Ralph S. Locher	William B. Brown	Paul W. Brown
1980	Frank D. Celebrezze	Robert E. Holmes	Thomas M. Herbert	A. William Sweeney	Ralph S. Locher	William B. Brown	Paul W. Brown
1980	Frank D. Celebrezze	Robert E. Holmes	David Dudley Dowd Jr.; 7/31/1980-1/1/1981	A. William Sweeney	Ralph S. Locher	William B. Brown	Paul W. Brown
1981	Frank D. Celebrezze	Robert E. Holmes	David D. Dowd Jr.	A. William Sweeney	Ralph S. Locher	William B. Brown	Paul W. Brown
1981	Frank D. Celebrezze	Robert E. Holmes	Clifford F. Brown; 1/2/1981-1/1/1987	A. William Sweeney	Ralph S. Locher	William B. Brown	Blanche Krupansky; 9/1/1981-1/10/1983
1982	Frank D. Celebrezze	Robert E. Holmes	Clifford F. Brown	A. William Sweeney	Ralph S. Locher	William B. Brown	Blanche Krupansky
1983	Frank D. Celebrezze	Robert E. Holmes	Clifford F. Brown	A. William Sweeney	Ralph S. Locher	William B. Brown	Blanche Krupansky
1983	Frank D. Celebrezze	Robert E. Holmes	Clifford F. Brown	A. William Sweeney	Ralph S. Locher	William B. Brown	James P. Celebrezze; 1/11/1983-1/1/1985
1984	Frank D. Celebrezze	Robert E. Holmes	Clifford F. Brown	A. William Sweeney	Ralph S. Locher	William B. Brown	James P. Celebrezze
