= List of justices of the Supreme Court of Ohio =

Seal of the Supreme Court of Ohio

Bold indicates chief judge or chief justice. The Ohio Supreme Court was created by the Ohio Constitution of 1802 with three judges, and had three or four through 1851. In 1851, the number of judges was increased to five. In 1892, the number of judges was increased to six. In 1912, the office of chief justice was created and the total number of judges was increased to seven (including the chief justice). In 1968, all the supreme court judges were re-titled as justice.

See also:

- List of Ohio politicians
- Ohio Supreme Court elections

== Chief justices ==
=== Chief judges (1803–1845) ===
Name	Party	Term
Return Jonathan Meigs Jr.	Democratic-Republican	1803–1804
Samuel Huntington	Democratic-Republican	1804–1808
William Sprigg	Democratic-Republican	1808–1810
Thomas Scott	Democratic-Republican	1810–1815
Ethan A. Brown	Democratic-Republican	1815–1819
Jessup Nash Couch	Democratic-Republican	1819–1821
Calvin Pease	Democratic-Republican	1821–1829
Peter Hitchcock		1829–1833
Joshua Collett		1833–1835
Ebenezer Lane		1835–1845

=== Chief justices (since 1913) ===
Name	Party	Term
Hugh L. Nichols	Democratic	1913–1920
Carrington T. Marshall	Republican	1921–1932
Carl V. Weygandt	Democratic	1933–1962
Kingsley A. Taft	Republican	1963–1970
C. William O'Neill	Republican	1970–1978
Robert E. Leach	Republican	1978
Frank D. Celebrezze Sr.	Democratic	1978–1986
Thomas J. Moyer	Republican	1987–2010
Eric Brown	Democratic	2010
Maureen O'Connor	Republican	2011–2022
Sharon L. Kennedy	Republican	2023–

== List of justices ==
denotes incumbent

Name	Began active service	Ended active service	Political affiliation	Appointed by
Return J. Meigs Jr.	1803	1804	Democratic- Republican	Ohio General Assembly
William Sprigg	1803	1806	Democratic- Republican	Ohio General Assembly
Samuel Huntington	1803	1808	Democratic- Republican	Ohio General Assembly
Daniel Symmes	1805	1808	Democratic- Republican	Elected
George Tod	1806	1810	Democratic- Republican	Edward Tiffin
Thomas Scott	1809	1815	Democratic- Republican	Elected
Thomas Morris	1809	1810	Democratic- Republican	Ohio House
William W. Irvin	1810	1816	Jacksonian	Ohio General Assembly
Ethan Allen Brown	1810	1818	Democratic- Republican	Ohio General Assembly
Jessup Nash Couch	1815	1821	Democratic- Republican	Thomas Worthington
John McLean	1816	1822	Jacksonian	Ohio General Assembly
Calvin Pease	1816	1830	Democratic- Republican	Ohio General Assembly
Peter Hitchcock	1819; 1835; 1845	1833; 1842; 1852	Democratic- Republican	Ohio General Assembly
Jacob Burnet	1821	1828	National Republican Party	Ethan Allen Brown
Charles Robert Sherman	1823	1829	National Republican Party	Ohio General Assembly
Joshua Collett	1829	1836	National Republican Party	Ohio General Assembly
Elijah Hayward	1830	1830	Democratic	Ohio General Assembly
John M. Goodenow	1830	1830	Jacksonian	–
Henry Brush	1830	1830	Democratic- Republican	Allen Trimble
Gustavus Swan	1830	1830	National Republican Party	Allen Trimble
Ebenezer Lane	1830	1845	National Republican Party	Ohio General Assembly
John C. Wright	1831	1835	Democratic- Republican	Ohio General Assembly
Reuben Wood	1833	1847	Democratic	–
Frederick Grimke	1836	1842	Democratic	Ohio General Assembly
Matthew Birchard	1842	1849	Democratic	Ohio General Assembly
Nathaniel C. Reed	1842	1849	Democratic	Ohio General Assembly
Edward Avery	1847	1851	Whig	Ohio General Assembly
Rufus P. Spalding	1849	1852	Democratic	Ohio General Assembly
William B. Caldwell	1849	1854	Democratic	Ohio General Assembly
Rufus P. Ranney	1851; 1863	1857; 1865	Democratic	Ohio General Assembly
Thomas W. Bartley	1852	1859	Democratic	Elected
John A. Corwin	1852	1854	Democratic	Elected
Allen G. Thurman	1852	1856	Democratic	Elected
Robert B. Warden	1854	1855	Democratic	William Medill
William Kennon Sr.	1854	1856	Democratic	William Medill
Joseph Rockwell Swan	1855	1859	Republican	Elected
Charles Cleveland Convers	1856	1856	Republican	Elected
Jacob Brinkerhoff	1856	1871	Republican	Elected
Ozias Bowen	1856	1858	Republican	Salmon P. Chase
Josiah Scott	1856	1872	Republican	Salmon P. Chase
Milton Sutliff	1858	1863	Republican	Elected
William Virgil Peck	1859	1864	Republican	Elected
William Y. Gholson	1859	1863	Republican	Elected
Horace Wilder	1863	1865	Republican	David Tod
Hocking H. Hunter	1864	1864	Republican	Elected
William White	1864	1883	Republican	John Brough
Luther Day	1865	1875	Republican	Elected
John Welch	1865	1878	Republican	John Brough
George W. McIlvaine	1871	1886	Republican	Elected
William H. West	1872	1873	Republican	Elected
Walter F. Stone	1873	1874	Republican	Edward Follansbee Noyes
George Rex	1874	1877	Democratic	William Allen
William J. Gilmore	1875	1880	Democratic	Elected
Washington W. Boynton	1877	1881	Republican	Elected
John W. Okey	1878	1885	Democratic	Elected
William Wartenbee Johnson	1880	1886	Republican	Elected
Nicholas Longworth II	1881	1883	Republican	Elected
William H. Upson	1883	1883	Republican	Charles Foster
John H. Doyle	1883	1883	Republican	Charles Foster
Martin Dewey Follett	1883	1887	Democratic	Elected
Selwyn N. Owen	1883	1889	Democratic	Elected
Gibson Atherton	1885	1885	Democratic	George Hoadly
William T. Spear	1885	1912	Republican	Elected
Thaddeus A. Minshall	1886	1902	Republican	Elected
Franklin J. Dickman	1886	1895	Republican	Joseph B. Foraker
Marshall Jay Williams	1887	1902	Republican	Elected
Joseph Perry Bradbury	1889	1902	Republican	Elected
Jacob F. Burket	1883	1904	Republican	Elected
John Allen Shauck	1895	1914	Republican	Elected
William Z. Davis	1900	1912	Republican	Elected
James Latimer Price	1902	1912	Republican	Elected
William B. Crew	1902	1911	Republican	George K. Nash
Augustus N. Summers	1904	1911	Republican	Elected
James G. Johnson	1911	1922	Democratic	Elected
Maurice H. Donahue	1911	1919	Democratic	Elected
Joseph W. O'Hara	1912	1912	Democratic	Judson Harmon
J. Foster Wilkin	1912	1914	Democratic	Elected
R. M. Wanamaker	1913	1924	Progressive Party	Elected
Oscar W. Newman	1913	1919	Democratic	Elected
Hugh L. Nichols	1913	1920	Democratic	James M. Cox
Thomas A. Jones	1915	1937	Republican	Elected
Edward S. Matthias	1915	1953	Republican	Elected
James E. Robinson	1919	1932	Republican	Elected
Stanley W. Merrell	1919	1920	Democratic	James M. Cox
Coleman W. Avery	1920	1920	Democratic	James M. Cox
Benson W. Hough	1920	1922	Republican	Elected
Carrington T. Marshall	1921	1932	Republican	Elected
George H. Clark	1922	1922	Republican	Harry L. Davis
Robert H. Day	1923	1933	Republican	Elected
Florence E. Allen	1923	1934	Democratic	Elected
Harry L. Conn	1924	1924	Democratic	Vic Donahey
Reynolds R. Kinkade	1925	1933	Republican	Elected
Will P. Stephenson	1932	1936	Democratic	George White
Carl V. Weygandt	1933	1962	Democratic	Elected
Howard Landis Bevis	1933	1934	Democratic	George White
Charles B. Zimmerman	1933; 1935	1934; 1969	Democratic	George White (first term)
Robert Nugen Wilkin	1934	1934	Democratic	George White
William L. Hart	1934; 1934	1934; 1957	Republican	–
W. F. Garver	1934	1934	Democratic	Elected
Roy Hughes Williams	1934	1946	Republican	Elected
Arthur H. Day	1935	1940	Republican	Elected
George S. Myers	1937	1940	Democratic	Elected
Robert N. Gorman	1937	1938	Democratic	Martin L. Davey
William C. Dixon	1938	1939	Democratic	Elected
Edward C. Turner	1940	1950	Republican	John W. Bricker
Gilbert Bettman	1941	1942	Republican	Elected
Charles S. Bell	1942	1947	Republican	Elected
Robert M. Sohngen	1947	1948	Democratic	Frank Lausche
James Garfield Stewart	1947	1959	Republican	Thomas J. Herbert
Kingsley A. Taft	1949	1962	Republican	Elected
Howard E. Faught	1950	1950	Democratic	Frank Lausche
Henry A. Middleton	1950	1954	Republican	Elected
John H. Lamneck	1953	1954	Democratic	Frank Lausche
John M. Matthias	1954	1970	Republican	Elected
James F. Bell	1955	1962	Democratic	Elected
Thomas J. Herbert	1957	1963	Republican	Elected
John Weld Peck II	1959	1960	Democratic	Michael DiSalle
C. William O'Neill	1960	1978	Republican	Elected
Lynn B. Griffith	1962	1964	Democratic	Michael DiSalle
Rankin Gibson	1963	1964	Democratic	Michael DiSalle
Paul M. Herbert	1963	1968	Republican	Elected
Louis J. Schneider Jr.	1964	1972	Republican	Elected
Paul W. Brown	1964; 1973	1968; 1981	Republican	Jim Rhodes (first term)
Robert Morton Duncan	1969	1971	Republican	Jim Rhodes
Thomas M. Herbert	1969	1980	Republican	Elected
J. J. P. Corrigan	1969	1976	Republican	Jim Rhodes
Leonard J. Stern	1970	1977	Republican	Jim Rhodes
Robert E. Leach	1970	1978	Republican	Jim Rhodes
Lloyd O. Brown	1971	1973	Democratic	John J. Gilligan
Frank Celebrezze	1972	1978	Democratic	Elected
William B. Brown	1973	1984	Democratic	Elected
A. William Sweeney	1977	1994	Democratic	Elected
Ralph S. Locher	1977	1989	Democratic	Elected
Robert E. Holmes	1978	1982	Republican	Jim Rhodes
David Dudley Dowd Jr.	1980	1981	Republican	Jim Rhodes
Clifford F. Brown	1981	1987	Democratic	Elected
Blanche Krupansky	1981	1983	Republican	Jim Rhodes
James Celebrezze	1983	1985	Democratic	Elected
Andy Douglas	1985	2002	Republican	Elected
J. Craig Wright	1985	1996	Republican	Elected
Thomas J. Moyer	1987	2010	Republican	Elected
Herbert R. Brown	1987	1993	Democratic	Elected
Alice Robie Resnick	1989	2007	Democratic	Elected
Francis E. Sweeney	1993	2004	Democratic	Elected
Paul Pfeifer	1993	2017	Republican	Elected
Deborah L. Cook	1995	2003	Republican	Elected
Evelyn Lundberg Stratton	1996	2012	Republican	George Voinovich
Maureen O'Connor	2003	2022	Republican	Elected
Terrence O'Donnell	2003	2018	Republican	Bob Taft
Judith Ann Lanzinger	2005	2016	Republican	Elected
Robert R. Cupp	2007	2013	Republican	Elected
Eric Brown	2010	2010	Democratic	Ted Strickland
Yvette McGee Brown	2011	2012	Democratic	Ted Strickland
Sharon L. Kennedy	2012	present	Republican	Elected
Judith L. French	2013	2021	Republican	John Kasich
William O'Neill	2013	2018	Democratic	Elected
Patrick F. Fischer	2017	present	Republican	Elected
Pat DeWine	2017	present	Republican	Elected
Mary DeGenaro	2018	2019	Republican	John Kasich
Michael P. Donnelly	2019	2025	Democratic	Elected
Melody J. Stewart	2019	2025	Democratic	Elected
Jennifer Brunner	2021	present	Democratic	Elected
Joe Deters	2023	present	Republican	Mike DeWine/Elected
Megan E. Shanahan	2025	present	Republican	Elected
Daniel R. Hawkins	2025	present	Republican	Elected

== Supreme Court Commission ==
In 1875, the Constitution of Ohio was amended to provide for the Supreme Court Commission. The amendment reads in part: "A commission, which shall consist of five members, shall be appointed by the governor, with the advice and consent of the Senate, the members of which shall hold office for the term of three years from and after the first day of February, 1876, to dispose of such part of the business then on the dockets of the Supreme Court, as shall, by arrangement between said commission and said court, be transferred to such commission; and said commission shall have like jurisdiction and power in respect to such business as are or may be vested in said court; and the members of said commission shall receive a like compensation for the time being, with the judges of said court."

=== Commission of 1876 ===
On February 2, 1876, Ohio Governor Rutherford B. Hayes appointed the following six members:

- Josiah Scott of Crawford County
- William Wartenbee Johnson of Lawrence County
- D. Thew Wright of Hamilton County
- Richard A. Harrison of Franklin County
- Henry C. Whitman of Hamilton County
- Luther Day of Portage County

Harrison refused the appointment, and Thomas Q. Ashburn of Clermont County was seated March 16, 1878. The commission sat until February 2, 1879, and "assisted in bringing up the docket which had fallen behind the reasonable time for trial."

=== Commission of 1883 ===
Governor Charles Foster appointed another commission of four men, which served from April 17, 1883 to April 16, 1885.

- George K. Nash of Franklin County
- Franklin J. Dickman of Cuyahoga County
- Charles D. Martin of Fairfield County
- John McCauley of Seneca County
