= Thomas Q. Ashburn (judge) =

American judge

Supreme Court Commission of Ohio
- In office February 2, 1876 – February 2, 1879 Serving with Josiah Scott; William Wartenbee Johnson; Daniel Thew Wright, Sr. Luther Day; Henry C. Whitman

Member of the Ohio Senate from the fourth district
- In office January 6, 1890 – January 17, 1890
- Preceded by: F. L. Lindsay
- Succeeded by: John M. Pattison

Personal details
- Born: February 9, 1820 Walnut Hills, Ohio
- Died: January 17, 1890 (aged 69) Columbus, Ohio
- Resting place: Batavia Union Cemetery
- Party: Democratic
- Spouses: Sarah W. Penn; Mary Ellen Griffith
- Children: six
- Education: Miami University; Jefferson College

Thomas Quin Ashburn (February 9, 1820 – January 17, 1890) was an American judge on the Supreme Court Commission of Ohio from 1876 to 1879, and a member of the Ohio State Senate for twelve days at the end of his life in 1890.

Thomas Ashburn was born at East Walnut Hills, Cincinnati, Ohio. He was the oldest of seven children of Richard Ashburn and Mary (Williams) Ashburn. The family soon moved to New Richmond, Clermont County, Ohio, where Thomas grew up.

Ashburn entered Miami University in 1838, and stayed for about eighteen months. He then taught school in New Richmond for two winters and spent his summers at farm labor. In 1841 he entered Jefferson College at Canonsburg, Pennsylvania, where he stayed through half his junior year. He then taught school again in Clermont County, and studied law at the Batavia, Ohio office of Shields & Howard, attorneys at that place.

Ashburn practiced law at New Richmond until 1846, when he removed to Batavia. He was prosecuting attorney of Clermont County from 1848 to 1852. In 1855, he ran for the Ohio Legislature, but was defeated. From 1861 to 1876, he was judge of Common Pleas for Adams, Brown and Clermont Counties. He ran for the Ohio Supreme Court in 1875, but was defeated 296,944 to 292,328 by Republican George W. McIlvaine.

Ashburn resigned from the Common Pleas Court in 1876, when he was appointed to the Supreme Court Commission of Ohio for a three year term by Governor Rutherford B. Hayes.

In February, 1879, after the commission was dissolved, Ashburn entered a partnership with George W. Hulick of Batavia, which continued until his death. In November 1889, he was elected to the Ohio State Senate as a Democrat. The session began January 6, 1890, and a dying Ashburn was carried into the chambers to vote for Calvin S. Brice for United States Senator on January 14 and 15. He died January 17, 1890.

Ashburn was married to Sarah W. Penn on December 3, 1846. She died November 10, 1854, survived by four children. He remarried to Mary Ellen Griffith, a first cousin of Ulysses S. Grant, on March 27, 1856, and they had two children.
