= Thomas Q. Ashburn =

Thomas Q. Ashburn may refer to:

- Thomas Q. Ashburn (judge)
- Thomas Q. Ashburn (general)
