= Francis E. Sweeney =

American judge

Francis Edward Sweeney Sr.

Justice of the Ohio Supreme Court
- In office January 1, 1993 – December 31, 2004
- Preceded by: Robert E. Holmes
- Succeeded by: Judith Ann Lanzinger

Personal details
- Born: January 24, 1934 Cuyahoga County, Ohio
- Died: April 10, 2011 (aged 77)
- Resting place: Holy Cross Cemetery, Brook Park, Ohio
- Party: Democratic
- Spouse: Lee Marie Yesback
- Children: four
- Education: Xavier University; Cleveland State University

Military service
- Allegiance: United States
- Branch/service: United States Army
- Years of service: 1957–1958

Francis Edward Sweeney Sr. (January 24, 1934 – April 10, 2011) was an American politician and jurist of the Ohio Democratic party. He served as a justice of the Ohio Supreme Court from 1993 to 2004. While on the court, he formed a majority coalition with fellow Democrat Alice Robie Resnick and Republicans Paul Pfeifer and Andrew Douglas.

He earned his Juris Doctor from the Cleveland State University College of Law in 1963.

Sweeney, played defensive tackle for Xavier as well as in the Canadian Football League. His grandson Jake Ryan was a linebacker in the NFL, while two of his other grandsons (Connor (wide receiver) and Zack (linebacker) Ryan) played college football at Ball State.
