= Terrence O'Donnell =

American judge

Hon. Terrence O'Donnell
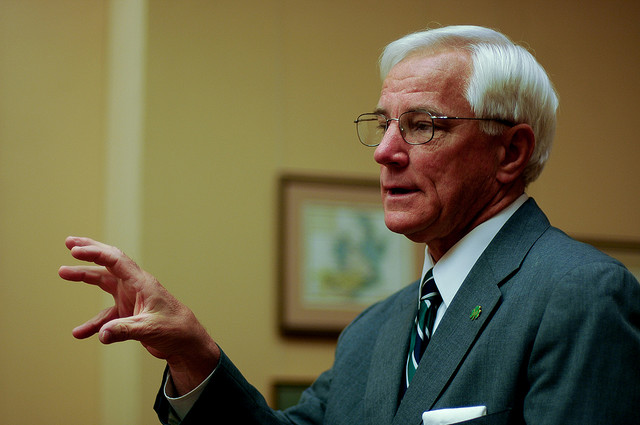
- Terrence O'Donnell in 2008.

Justice of the Ohio Supreme Court
- In office May 19, 2003 – December 31, 2018
- Nominated by: Robert A. Taft II
- Preceded by: Deborah L. Cook
- Succeeded by: Michael P. Donnelly

Judge, Cuyahoga County Court of Appeals
- In office 2000–2003
- Preceded by: Frank Celebrezze

Judge, Cuyahoga County Common Pleas Court
- In office 1994–2000

Personal details
- Born: February 11, 1946 (age 80) Lakewood, Ohio
- Party: Republican
- Spouse: Mary Beth
- Children: 4
- Education: Kent State University (BS); Cleveland State University (JD)

Terrence O'Donnell (born February 11, 1946) is a former associate justice of the Supreme Court of Ohio.

== Education ==
He graduated in 1964 from St. Edward High School, an all-boys Catholic high school on Cleveland's west side. He did his undergraduate studies at Kent State University, graduating with a degree in political science in 1968. He earned his Juris Doctor at the Cleveland State University College of Law in 1971.

He later clerked for Ohio Supreme Court Justice J.J.P. Corrigan in 1971 and then clerked for Judge John V. Corrigan and Judge John M. Manos on the 8th District Court of Appeals in Cuyahoga County, where he later returned as an appellate judge.

== Career ==
Justice Terrence O'Donnell joined the Supreme Court of Ohio in 2003 as its 149th justice. During his tenure on the Court, he led statewide efforts to increase professionalism among lawyers and judges across Ohio, culminating in the implementation of a Lawyer to Lawyer Mentoring Program that is recognized nationally as one of the finest in the United States.

Justice O'Donnell began his judicial career in 1980 on the Cuyahoga County Common Pleas Court—the busiest trial court in Ohio—and served there for 14 years until his election to the Eighth District Court of Appeals in 1994. He served there for eight years, and subsequently served as a visiting trial court judge in various counties throughout the state before joining the Supreme Court in 2003.

He began his legal career at the Ohio Supreme Court as a law clerk to Justice J.J.P. Corrigan in 1971, and then clerked for Judges John V. Corrigan and John M. Manos on the Eighth District Court of Appeals. Before beginning his judicial service, he practiced law with the firm of Marshman, Snyder & Corrigan in Cleveland for six years.

A former school teacher, Justice O'Donnell was a founding member and past president of the Legal Eagles — a law fraternity for alumni of St. Edward High School in Lakewood, and a frequent lecturer at its year-end seminar. He also was a member of the Ohio State Bar Foundation Fellows Class of 2005, past member of the board of trustees of Magnificat High School, and the board of trustees of the Lawyers Guild of the Diocese of Cleveland.

Justice O'Donnell also served as chairman of the Ohio Legal Rights Service Commission, which oversees the protection and advocacy of the developmentally disabled and mentally ill statewide. He was a past member of the board of trustees of Our Lady of the Wayside, a nonprofit organization dedicated to serving the needs of the mentally and physically challenged where his brother, John, lived for 10 years until he died in 2011.

Justice O'Donnell was honored by every school and university he attended: St. Edward High School presented him with its Alumnus of the Year Award in 2005, Kent State University recognized him as an outstanding graduate of the College of Arts & Sciences, and Cleveland State University awarded him its Distinguished Alumni Award. In addition, the University of Akron School of Law conferred an honorary doctor of law degree when he presented the commencement address in 2005. He was named Person of the Year by the Mayo Society of Greater Cleveland in 2015, was the 2006 recipient of the Jurisprudence Award from the American ORT Cleveland Chapter, and he became a member of the 2011 Irish Legal 100, a group of prominent Irish lawyers and judges selected from across the United States.

In 2006 the New York Times reported that Justice O'Donnell ruled in favor of his campaign contributors 91 percent of the time, more than any other Ohio Supreme Court justice.

Justice O'Donnell resides in Rocky River with his wife, Mary Beth. The couple has four adult children—Terrence, Michael, Colleen, and Nora, and eight grandchildren, Terrence, Charlie, Claire, Emmett, Kevin, Molly, Maggie, and Andrew.

Justice O’Donnell's term on the Supreme Court ended on Dec. 31, 2018, due to Ohio's mandatory age limits for judges.

== Personal life ==
He and his wife Mary Beth reside in Rocky River, Ohio, and have four children: Terrence, Michael, Colleen and Nora.

== See also ==
- List of justices of the Ohio Supreme Court
- Ohio Supreme Court elections
