= Matthew Birchard =

American judge (1804–1876)

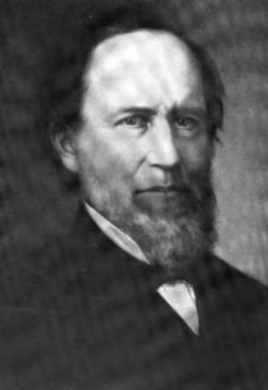

3rd Solicitor of the United States Treasury
- In office January 16, 1840 – March 17, 1841
- Preceded by: Henry D. Gilpin
- Succeeded by: Charles B. Penrose

Justice of the Ohio Supreme Court
- In office February 15, 1842 – February 22, 1849
- Preceded by: Peter Hitchcock
- Succeeded by: William B. Caldwell

Personal details
- Born: January 19, 1804 Becket, Massachusetts
- Died: June 16, 1876 (aged 72) Warren, Ohio
- Resting place: Oakwood Cemetery
- Party: Democratic
- Spouse: Jane E. Weaver
- Children: two

Matthew Birchard (January 19, 1804 – June 16, 1876) was a judge in the U.S. State of Ohio who was an Ohio Supreme Court Judge 1842–1849.

Matthew Birchard was born in Becket, Massachusetts, and came to Trumbull County, Ohio, near Warren at age eight. He was admitted to the bar in 1828, and formed a partnership with future governor David Tod, and six years later was elected Common Pleas Judge.

Birchard accepted an appointment with the Federal Government for a time from his friend Andrew Jackson, first as Solicitor for the United States General Land Office, and then to succeed Henry D. Gilpin as Solicitor of the United States Treasury. He returned to Warren in 1841. He was elected from Trumbull County by the Ohio General Assembly as a judge of the Ohio Supreme Court for a seven-year term, and served 1842–1849.

He was elected to the Ohio House of Representatives in 1853 and served in the 51st General Assembly, 1854–1855. He lost election to Congress in 1856 as the Democratic nominee in the 20th district.

In 1867, Birchard purchased the newspaper Warren Constitution and ran it with his son until his death in 1876 in Warren. He is buried at Oakwood Cemetery.

One author appraised Birchard thus: "His written opinions are characterized by felicity of expression and perspicuity of thought. His pertinacity has been bluntly denominated stubbornness." Another opined : "The opinions of Judge Birchard were characterized by fluency of expression and clearness of logic. He was known as a man of strong convictions, great will of power, and possessed pertinacity of the sort that causes one juror out of twelve to dissent from the opinion of colleagues." While a third stated: "...his opinions show him to have been a man of learning and research, with a strong sense of justice."

Birchard married Jane E. Weaver of Bella Vista, Virginia in 1841 and raised two children.

== Notes ==
Legal offices
| Preceded by Peter Hitchcock | Ohio Supreme Court Judges; 1842-1849 | Succeeded by William B. Caldwell |
Ohio House of Representatives
| Preceded by F. E. Stone | Representative from Trumbull County; 1854-1855 | Succeeded by George T. Townsend; Ralph Plumb |
