= Clinton D. Boyd =

American judge (1884–1950)

- Born: Clinton Dewitt Boyd; September 26, 1884; Mount Orab, Ohio, U.S.
- Died: September 20, 1950 (aged 65); London, Ohio, U.S.
- Burial place: Woodside Cemetery, Middletown, Ohio
- Other name: Clint Boyd
- Education: Miami University; University of Michigan
- Occupations: Judge and lawyer
- Known for: Founder of Phi Kappa Tau

Clinton DeWitt Boyd, also known as Clint Boyd, (September 26, 1884 – September 20, 1950) was a Middletown, Ohio attorney, Common Pleas judge, and politician and was one of four founders of Phi Kappa Tau fraternity as an undergraduate at Miami University.

== Early life ==
Boyd was born and raised in Mount Orab, Ohio. He attended public schools before attending the Miami Academy in Oxford, Ohio his junior year of high school.

He enrolled at Miami University in 1904. There, he was a distance runner, representing the varsity track team in the mile and 880-yard events. He captained the track team in 1906 and 1907. He was also the champion of the intramural track team his freshman year.

Boyd was a member of the Miami Union Literary Society and was elected vice president. He won the gold medal in the university's oratorical contest in 1907 with his speech, "Emancipation of a Backward Race". He graduated from college in 1908.

Boyd enrolled in the University of Cincinnati's law school for the 1907-1908 academic year. He transferred to the University of Michigan, graduating with a law degree in 1910.

== Career ==
Boyd started a law practice in Middletown, Ohio. In 1924, he ran in the Republican primary for Lieutenant Governor of Ohio but was defeated. He was also defeated in 1926, 1928, and 1944 Republican primaries for Ohio Attorney General.

The governor appointed Boyd to the common pleas bench of Butler County, Ohio in 1929; he was twice reelected to that position, retiring in 1937. He then returned to private practice in Middleton, working until his death.

He was defeated in the Republican primary for Chief Justice of the Ohio Supreme Court in 1938. In 1950, he was defeated in the general elections for judge of the Ohio Supreme Court.

== Personal life ==
Boyd married Clara Cretors and the couple had three children, Betty, Clinton, and Robert. Boyd helped to initiate Clinton into Phi Kappa Tau at Miami University in 1948, and their grandson, Mark, became a member of the Alpha chapter in 1971. After Clara died, Boyd married Sophia Marie Schaeuble Huntington.

Boyd was a member of the Freemans, the Junior Order, and the Shriners. He was a member of the Methodist Church. He remained active in the Phi Kappa Tau throughout his life. He was the first person National Organizer, elected at the fraternity's 1915 convention. In this role, he worked to extend the fraternity to Carnegie Tech, Northwestern University, Purdue University, University of Nevada, University of Wisconsin, and Wabash College. He spoke at the fraternity's Founders' Day celebrations in Miami and nationwide. In the final year of his life, he visited several chapters and alumni on the West Coast.

Boyd was killed in an automobile accident near London, Ohio in September 1950 when the car he was driving skidded on a slick road en route to the Ohio Republican Convention. His wife, Marie, was injured in the accident and taken to the hospital. Boyd was interred at Woodside Cemetery in Middletown.

== Honors ==
- In 1935, Phi Kappa Tau fraternity commissioned a portrait of Boyd that hangs in its central office.
- Phi Kappa Tau presents the Clinton D. Boyd VPAR Award each year to the individual serving as vice president for alumni relations at his chapter. The award is given in Boyd's memory.
- His widow established the Clinton Dewitt Boyd Sr. Memorial Fund in 1955; this endowment has been added to by fraternity members and allows Phi Kappa Tau to give annual awards to undergraduate students.
