= Charles S. Bell =

American judge

Charles Steele Bell

Associate Justice of the Ohio Supreme Court
- In office December 1, 1942 – February 28, 1947
- Preceded by: Gilbert Bettman
- Succeeded by: James Garfield Stewart

Hamilton County Prosecuting Attorney
- In office 1922–1926
- Preceded by: Louis H. Capelle
- Succeeded by: Charles Phelps Taft II

Personal details
- Born: October 8, 1880 Carthage, Ohio
- Died: May 6, 1965 (aged 84) Cincinnati, Ohio
- Resting place: Spring Grove Cemetery
- Party: Republican
- Spouse: Florence Helen Bolce
- Education: YMCA School of Law, Cincinnati

Charles Steele Bell (October 8, 1880 – May 6, 1965) was a lawyer from Cincinnati, Ohio, who served as a prosecutor and judge. He was Associate Justice of the Supreme Court of Ohio 1942–1947.

== Education ==
Bell was born October 8, 1880, in Carthage, Ohio, to Samuel and Mary Alice Logan Bell. When his father died, Bell dropped out of school at age sixteen to support his family. He was a railway clerk, and studied law at the night school of the YMCA School of Law (Cincinnati). He graduated in 1908, and was admitted to the Ohio bar in 1910.

== Legal ==
Bell joined the private law practice of his brother, Samuel Walter Bell in 1910. He continued in solo practice when his brother was elected judge of the Cincinnati Municipal Court in 1916, and also was assistant solicitor of Carthage and Elmwood Place. He was assistant prosecuting attorney of Hamilton County beginning in 1919, and was later elected prosecuting attorney.

== Judicial ==
Bell was elected to the Hamilton County Court of Common Pleas, and was re-elected in 1924 and 1930. He was the first judge in the county to sentence a woman to death. She had murdered several men by arsenic poisoning to steal their money. On July 17, 1942, Gilbert Bettman of the Ohio Supreme Court died. Bell won election to the remaining four years of Bettman's term in November, and was seated December 1, 1942. He won re-election in 1946 to a full six-year term. He served until February 28, 1947, when he resigned, citing failing eyesight. Governor Thomas J. Herbert immediately appointed James Garfield Stewart to the Supreme Court, and appointed Bell to a vacancy on the Hamilton County Court of Common Pleas. Bell served on this court until his death.

== Personal ==
Bell was married to Florence Helen Bolce. He died in Cincinnati on May 6, 1965, and was buried at Spring Grove Cemetery.
