= Andy Douglas (judge) =

American judge (1932–2021)

Justice of the Ohio Supreme Court
- In office January 1, 1985 – December 31, 2002
- Preceded by: William B. Brown
- Succeeded by: Maureen O'Connor

Personal details
- Born: Andrew Grant Douglas; July 5, 1932 Toledo, Ohio, U.S.
- Died: September 23, 2021 (aged 89)
- Party: Republican
- Spouse: Joan Bowman (died 1966)
- Children: 4
- Education: University of Toledo College of Law

Military service
- Allegiance: United States
- Branch/service: United States Army
- Years of service: 1954–1956
- Rank: First Lieutenant

Andrew Grant Douglas (July 5, 1932 – September 23, 2021) was an American Republican justice of the Ohio Supreme Court who served in that office from 1985 to 2002.

== Early life ==
Douglas was born in July 1932 in Toledo, Ohio to Andrew and Elizabeth Douglas. Between 1954 and 1956, he served in the U.S. Army Infantry and Signal Corps and obtained the rank of first lieutenant. He attended the University of Toledo, where in 1959 he earned a degree in law.

== Legal career ==
In 1960, Douglas co-founded the law firm Winchester & Douglas. He practiced law in Toledo and Lucas County for 20 years. He also served as special counsel to the Attorney General of Ohio. The following year, he was one of the youngest members elected to Toledo City Council. He was re-elected nine times, and served until 1980.

In 1980, Douglas was elected to the 6th District Court of Appeals. By appointment of the chief justice of the Supreme Court of Ohio, he sat as a trial judge for the common pleas courts in various counties during 1982 and 1983. From 1980 to 1984, he was an instructor at the University of Toledo Community and Technical College. In 1984, Douglas defeated the Cuyahoga Court of Common Pleas Judge John Corrigan for Justice of the Supreme Court. He was re-elected in 1990 and 1996. During that time, he also taught at Ohio Dominican College from 1992 to 1995.

During the 1990s, Justice Douglas and Justices Alice Robie Resnick, Francis E. Sweeney and Paul E. Pfeifer forged a majority. Their decisions expanded workers’ compensation rights, increased liabilities for insurance companies and declared the Ohio system of funding public schools unconstitutional.

In an interview with The Plain Dealer in December 2002, Douglas said his most meaningful case during his Supreme Court career was in 1987 with Dayton Power & Light Company v. Ohio Civil Rights Commission. A group of Dayton Power & Light employees were engaged in “horseplay” on Sept. 12, 1982 and damaged company property. Of the employees involved, Samuel Prather was the only African-American and the only employee fired on Sept. 13, 1982. The Supreme Court ruled that the power company unlawfully discharged Prather. Douglas remarked, “Every case that comes here is important, but if I had to choose an example of moral persuasion of the court and the ability to do the right thing, that's it.”

Douglas explained his judicial philosophy in a 1997 commencement address to Cleveland State University Cleveland-Marshall College of Law students:

“But a simple rule can help you meet and exceed those expectations. As you traverse the rocky terrain of the modern practice of law, always keep this principle in mind... Endeavor to give your clients advice which will advance their interests while also furthering the interests of justice. I can think of no greater comfort than laying down your head on your pillow each night knowing, on that day you helped somebody. We, in our profession, can do that each and every day.”

Douglas could not run for a fourth term, as he reached the mandatory retirement age of 70 in 2002. He retired on December 31, 2002, and joined the Columbus law firm of Crabbe, Brown & James as a partner. He also served as executive director of the Ohio Civil Service Employees Association (OCSEA). Douglas served of counsel with the Columbus law firm of Mazanec, Raskin & Ryder Co., LPA.

== Personal life ==
Douglas married Joan Bowman, who died at the age of 33 in 1966. They have four children: Cindy, Robert, Andy, and David. Douglas died on September 23, 2021, at the age of 89.

== See also ==
- List of justices of the Ohio Supreme Court
- Ohio Supreme Court elections

Legal offices
Preceded by William B. Brown	Ohio Supreme Court Justice; 1985–2002	Succeeded by Maureen O'Connor
