= Carrington T. Marshall =

American judge (1869–1958)

Carrington Tanner Marshall
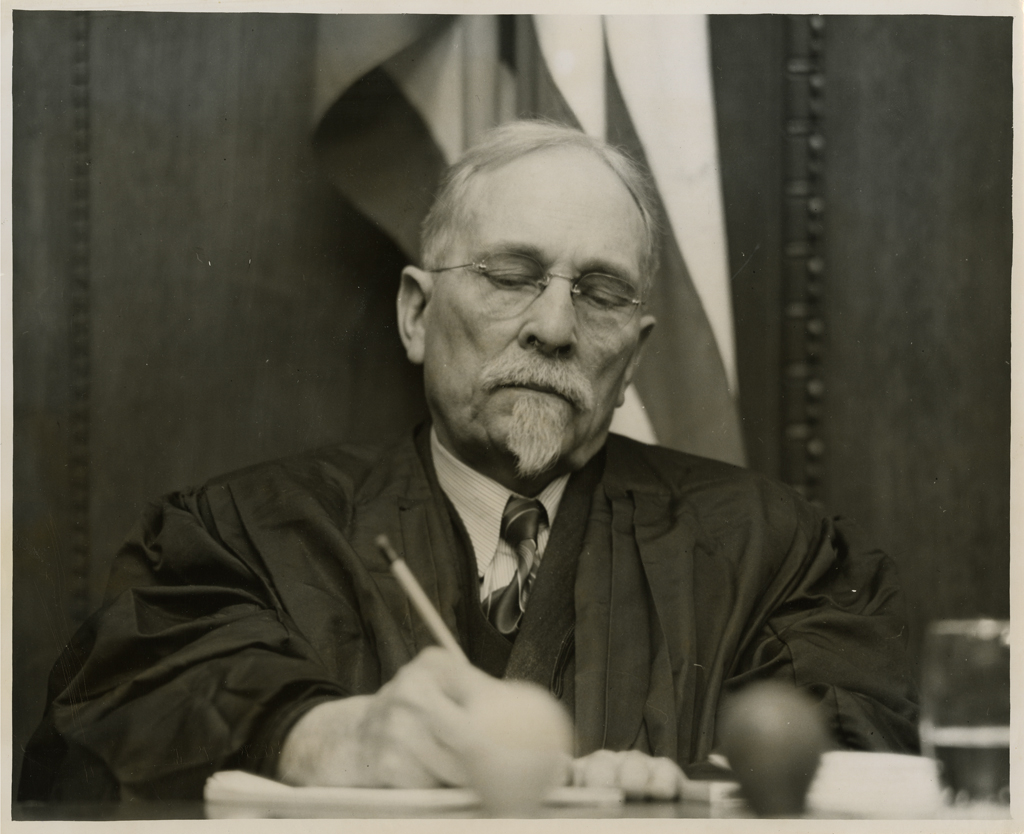
- at Nuremberg Trials, February 17, 1947

Chief Justice of the Ohio Supreme Court
- In office January 1, 1921 – December 31, 1932
- Preceded by: Hugh L. Nichols
- Succeeded by: Carl V. Weygandt

Personal details
- Born: June 17, 1869 Zanesville, Ohio
- Died: June 28, 1958 (aged 89) Bexley, Ohio
- Resting place: Zanesville Memorial Park
- Party: Republican
- Spouse: Dora Foltz
- Children: one
- Education: Cincinnati Law School

Carrington Tanner Marshall (June 17, 1869 – June 28, 1958) was a lawyer from Zanesville, Ohio, United States who served for twelve years as Chief Justice of the Ohio Supreme Court, and was later a judge at the Nuremberg Trials.

== Biography ==
Carrington T. Marshall was born near Zanesville, Ohio June 17, 1869. He attended a one-room country school, and rode seven miles a day to attend high school in Zanesville. He taught school for three years, and was a bookkeeper. In 1892, he graduated from the Cincinnati Law School, and began a practice at Zanesville.

The first office Marshall held was Chief Justice of the Ohio Supreme Court. He was nominated by the Republicans to run against incumbent Democrat Hugh L. Nichols. He won election in November 1920. The University of Cincinnati awarded him an honorary Doctor of Law in 1925. Marshall won re-election in 1926, but lost to Carl V. Weygandt in 1932.

After leaving the bench, Marshall established a practice in Columbus, Ohio. He wrote a number of books. In 1947, he served as presiding judge of the Judges' Trial (The United States of America vs. Josef Altstötter, et al.), one of twelve trials for war crimes held before U.S. military courts in Nuremberg in 1947. He was appointed February 13, 1947, by General Lucius D. Clay of the Office of Military Government for Germany. Due to illness, Marshall resigned June 19, 1947, and returned to Ohio.

Marshall died June 30, 1958, at home in Bexley, Ohio. He was buried at Zanesville Memorial Park in Zanesville.

Marshall married Dora Foltz in June 1900. They had one daughter.

== Publications ==
- History of Courts and Lawyers of Ohio
- New Divorce Courts for Old
- Liberty Under Laws in America
- Law Reforms and Law Reformers

== External sources ==
- "1926 Republican Party Sample Ballot with picture of Marshall". Columbus Public Library.
- Carrington T. Marshall at Find a Grave
