= William L. Hart =

American judge

William Lincoln Hart
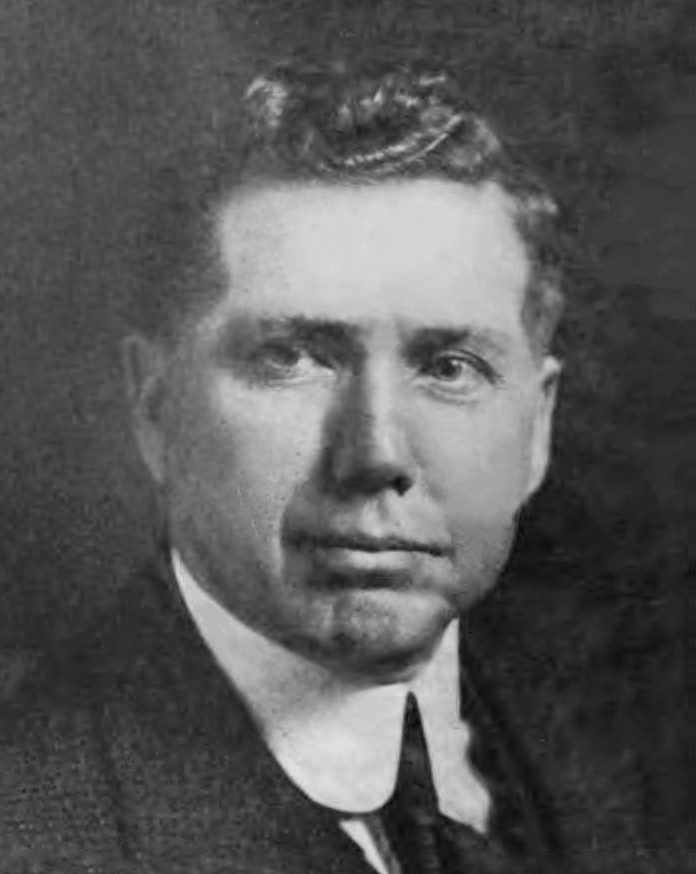
- William L. Hart in 1921

Associate Justice of the Ohio Supreme Court
- In office November, 1934 – December 1934
- Preceded by: Robert Nugen Wilkin
- Succeeded by: Arthur H. Day
- In office January 1939 – January 1957
- Preceded by: William C. Dixon
- Succeeded by: Thomas J. Herbert

Personal details
- Born: February 5, 1867 Columbiana County, Ohio
- Died: April 29, 1962 (aged 95) Alliance, Ohio
- Resting place: Alliance City Cemetery
- Party: Republican
- Spouse: Ida B. Caskey
- Children: Ian Bruce, William Lincoln Jr.
- Education: Mount Union College; University of Michigan Law School

William Lincoln Hart (February 5, 1867 – April 29, 1962) was a lawyer in the U.S. State of Ohio who served as a justice of the Supreme Court of Ohio. He taught law at university, and was president of the Ohio State Bar Association.

== Biography ==
William Lincoln Hart was born February 5, 1867, to Benjamin F. and Ariel S. (Dreghorn) Hart of Salineville or Inverness, Columbiana County, Ohio. He attended the schools of Columbiana County, and began teaching at age 18. He alternated teaching and attending Mount Union College, Alliance, Stark County, Ohio, for seven years, and graduated A.B. in 1893. He taught in the schools of his home district, and Madison and Butler Townships, Columbiana County, and Paris Township, Stark County. During 1893 to 1895 he was city editor of the Alliance Daily Critic. In 1895 he entered the University of Michigan Law School, and graduated Bachelor of Laws in 1897. He was president of the senior class and was Alpha Tau Omega.

Hart was admitted to the bar in Ohio, June 10, 1897, and to the United States District Court for the Northern District of Ohio and United States Court of Appeals for the Sixth Circuit, March 23, 1903. He began practice in Alliance October 1, 1897, and partnered with Dennis E. Rogers March 1898 to Roger's death January, 1903 as Rodgers and Hart. Partnered from February 1903 with Hugo C. Koehler as Hart & Koehler, and ended up with Hart, Blumenstein and Strong. He was elected president of the Ohio State Bar Association 1923-1924, and lectured on international law and international relations at Mt. Union College, where he also served as trustee.

Hart was a member of the legal advisory board of Stark County during World War I. In November, 1934, Hart was elected as a Republican to fill a short term on the Ohio Supreme Court, and resumed private practice afterward.

Hart was elected to a six-year term in 1938, re-elected in 1944 and again in 1950, retiring at age 89. He died in 1962, and was buried in Alliance City Cemetery.

Hart was a member of the Ohio Society of Mayflower Descendants, the Knights Templar, Knights of Pythias, Methodist Episcopal Church, American Society of International Law, and the American Society of Legal Authors. He was married September 15, 1897, to Ida B. Caskey of Alliance, and had two sons, both attorneys, Ian Bruce Hart, and William Lincoln Hart, Jr.

== See also ==
- List of justices of the Ohio Supreme Court

== Publications ==
- Hart, William Lincoln. Hart family history : Silas Hart, his ancestors and descendants. Alliance, Ohio. OCLC 13256489.
