= Will P. Stephenson =

American judge

Will Stephenson

Justice of the Ohio Supreme Court
- In office February 9, 1932 – December 31, 1936
- Appointed by: George White
- Preceded by: James E. Robinson
- Succeeded by: George S. Myers

Personal details
- Born: Will Prettyman Stephenson; July 31, 1868 Bentonville, Ohio, U.S.
- Died: April 23, 1943 (aged 74) Cincinnati, Ohio, U.S.
- Party: Democratic
- Spouse: Stella Shriver
- Children: Sherwood C.
- Education: University of Cincinnati (LLB)

Will Prettyman Stephenson (July 31, 1868 – April 23, 1943) was an American attorney and jurist who served as a justice of the Supreme Court of Ohio from 1932 to 1936.

== Early life and education ==
Stephenson was born in Bentonville, Adams County, Ohio on July 31, 1868 to Robert Amasa and Arcadia Hopkins Stephenson. He was a member of the first graduating class of Manchester High School in 1886. He studied law with Judge Henry Collings during vacations. He later graduated from the University of Cincinnati College of Law in 1895.

== Career ==
From 1881 to 1891, Stephenson taught school in Adams County. After graduating from law school in 1895, he was admitted to the bar of Ohio that year, and began a practice in Manchester.

In 1901 Stephenson became deputy county auditor under his father. He moved his practice to West Union. In 1910 and 1911 he was special prosecutor in an election fraud case. One-third of the voters in Adams County were indicted for accepting bribes, and Judge A.Z. Blair fined 2,000 people.

In spite of his prosecution of voters, Stephenson was elected Common Pleas Judge in 1914, and was re-elected in 1920 and 1926. He was an unsuccessful Democratic candidate for Supreme Court of Ohio in 1930.

On January 27, 1932, Justice James E. Robinson of the Ohio Supreme Court died. On January 30, 1932, Governor White appointed Stephenson to fill the term until the next election. He was administered the oath of office on February 9, 1932. On November 8, 1932, he won election to the remaining years of the term, ending December 31, 1936. He lost to Roy Hughes Williams on November 3, 1936 when he sought a full six-year term.

On December 7, 1936, Ohio Attorney General-elect Herbert S. Duffy appointed Stephenson to the Office of Special Counsel. He served January 1937 to January 1939.

== Personal life ==
Stephenson married Stella Stivers on March 14, 1893. They had one son. Stephenson died at Good Samaritan Hospital in Cincinnati on April 23, 1943.
