= John Welch (politician) =

American judge

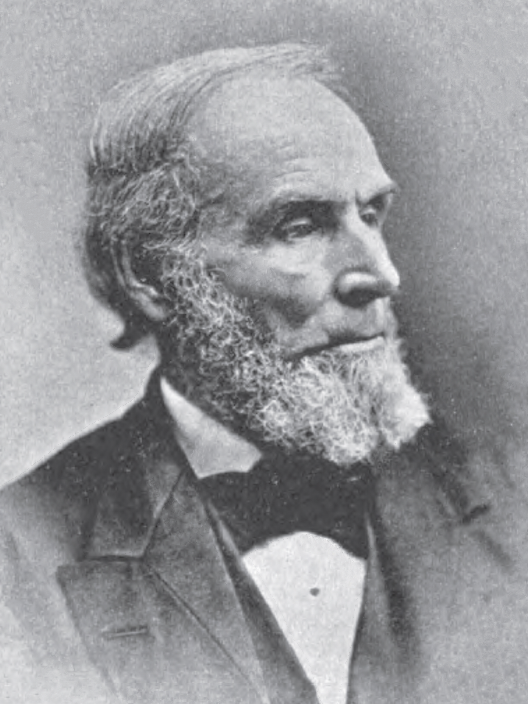

Member of the U.S. House of Representatives from Ohio's 12th district
- In office March 4, 1851 – March 3, 1853
- Preceded by: Samuel Finley Vinton
- Succeeded by: Edson B. Olds

Associate Justice of the Ohio Supreme Court
- In office February 23, 1865 – February 9, 1878
- Appointed by: John Brough
- Preceded by: Rufus P. Ranney
- Succeeded by: John W. Okey

Member of the Ohio Senate from the Athens & Meigs County district
- In office December 1, 1845 – December 5, 1847
- Preceded by: Abraham Van Vorhes
- Succeeded by: Horace Horton

Personal details
- Born: October 28, 1805 New Athens, Ohio, U.S.
- Died: August 5, 1891 (aged 85) Athens, Ohio, U.S.
- Resting place: West Union Cemetery
- Party: Whig, Republican
- Spouse: Martha Starr
- Children: two
- Education: Franklin College

John Welch (October 28, 1805 – August 5, 1891) was an American lawyer, jurist, and politician who served one term as a U.S. representative from Ohio from 1851 to 1853.

== Biography ==
Born near New Athens, Ohio, Welch received a liberal schooling and graduated from Franklin College. He moved to Athens County in 1828 and settled in Rome Township. He engaged in the milling business. He studied law.

He was admitted to the bar and commenced practice in Athens, Ohio, in 1833. He served as prosecuting attorney of Athens County from 1841 to 1843, and as a member of the Ohio Senate from 1845 to 1847.

=== Congress ===
Welch was elected as a Whig to the Thirty-second Congress (March 4, 1851 – March 3, 1853). He declined to be a candidate for renomination in 1852.

=== Later career ===
He served as delegate to the Whig National Convention in 1852. He resumed the practice of law. Presidential elector for Republicans Fremont/Dayton in 1856 He served as judge of the court of common pleas 1862–1865.

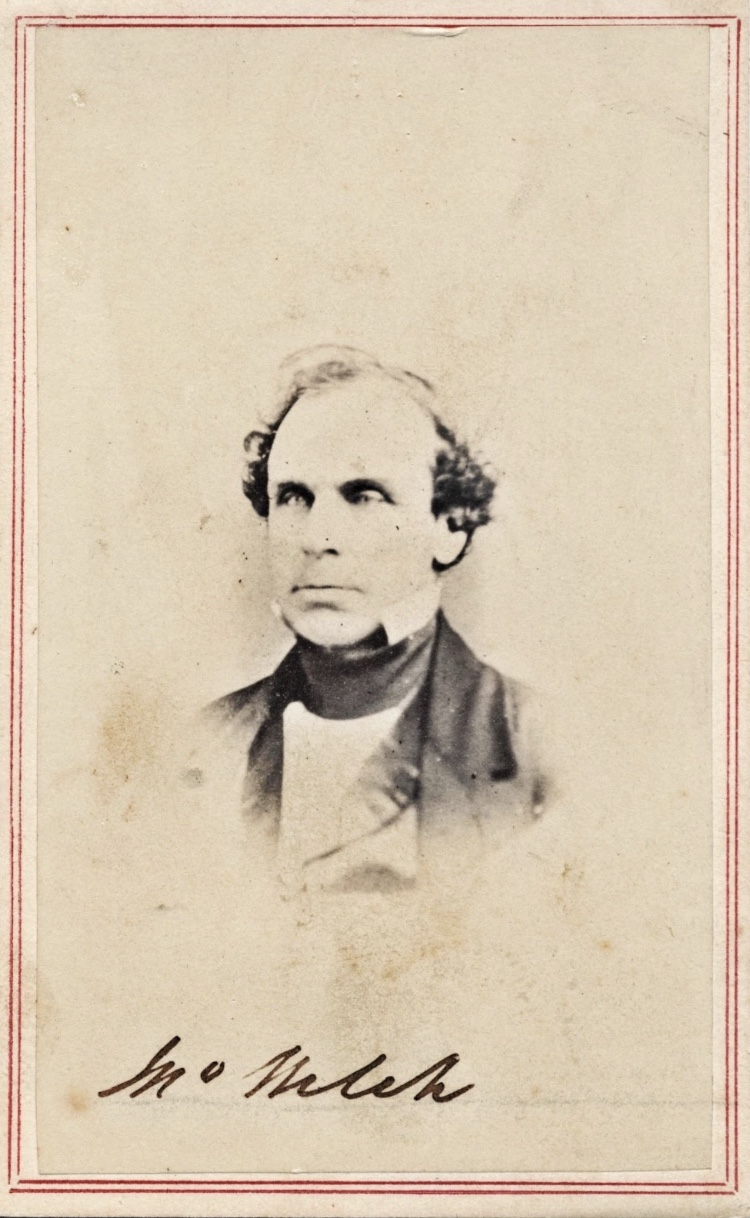
Ohio Judge John Welch CDV

He served as associate justice of the supreme court of Ohio from 1865 to 1878, and was chief justice in 1877 and 1878.

=== Death and burial ===
He died in Athens, Ohio, August 5, 1891. He was interred in West Union Street Cemetery.

=== Family ===
Welch was married in 1829 to Martha Starr, who had two sons.

== Publications ==
Welch, John (1887). An index-digest to the reports of cases decided in the courts of Ohio: embracing the Supreme, Circuit, Common pleas and Superior court decisions to May, 1886. Robert Clarke & co. OCLC 11767958.

== Sources ==
- United States Congress. "John Welch (id: W000263)". Biographical Directory of the United States Congress.
- Smith, Joseph P, ed. (1898). History of the Republican Party in Ohio. Vol. I. Chicago: the Lewis Publishing Company.
- Smith, Joseph P, ed. (1898). History of the Republican Party in Ohio. Vol. II. Chicago: the Lewis Publishing Company.

U.S. House of Representatives
| Preceded by Samuel F. Vinton | Member of the U.S. House of Representatives from Ohio's 12th congressional district March 4, 1851 – March 3, 1853 | Succeeded by Edson B. Olds |
