= Carl V. Weygandt =

American judge

Carl Victor Weygandt
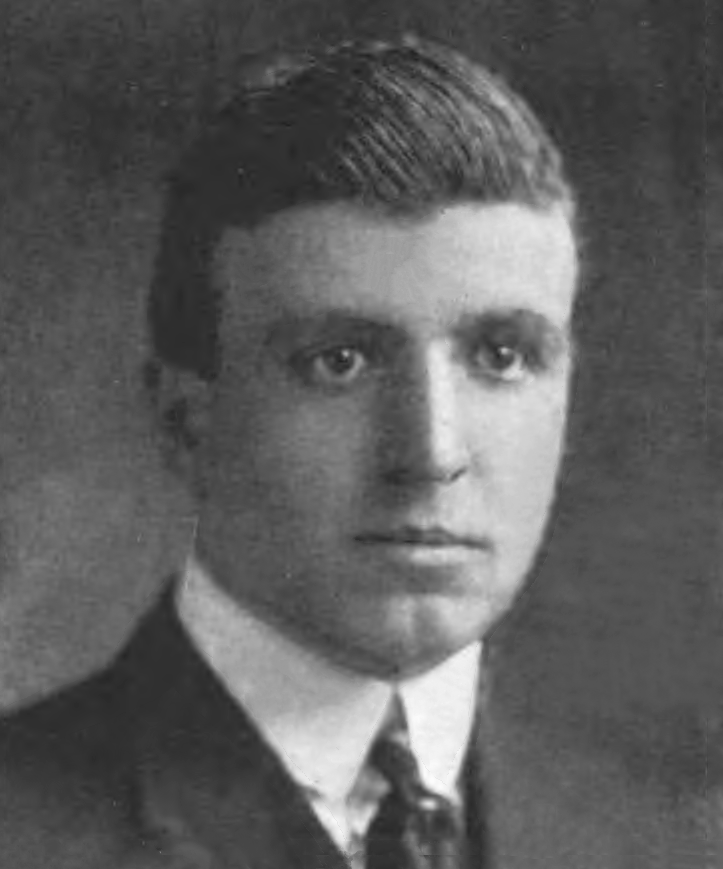
- circa 1921

Chief Justice of the Ohio Supreme Court
- In office January 1, 1933 – December 31, 1962
- Preceded by: Carrington T. Marshall
- Succeeded by: Kingsley A. Taft

Member of the Ohio House of Representatives from the Cuyahoga County district
- In office January 3, 1921 – December 31, 1922

Personal details
- Born: June 14, 1888 Baughman Township, Ohio
- Died: September 4, 1964 (aged 76) Lakewood, Ohio
- Resting place: Wooster Cemetery
- Party: Democratic
- Spouse: Jessie May Silver
- Children: three
- Education: College of Wooster; Case Western Reserve University School of Law

Carl Victor Weygandt was a jurist in the U.S. State of Ohio. He was Chief Justice of the Ohio Supreme Court for thirty years.

== Biography ==
Carl Victor Weygandt was born in Baughman Township, Ohio on June 14, 1888. He was the son of W.E. And Cora Mock Weygandt. He graduated from Wooster High School in 1906. He taught in elementary school from 1906 to 1908, before entering the College of Wooster, where he graduated in 1912. He was an excellent student who was Phi Beta Kappa, and was fullback on the football team.

From 1912 to 1915, Weygandt taught at Wooster High School and at the College of Wooster. He graduated from Case Western Reserve University School of Law in 1918, and was admitted to the Ohio Bar June 24, 1918, and to the bar of the United States District Court for the Northern District of Ohio June 25, 1919. He joined the Cleveland law firm Thomas, Hine & Flory in 1919. He also was a football referee from 1915 to 1932, officiating games from Massachusetts to Nebraska.

== Public service ==
Weygandt was elected to the Ohio House of Representatives in 1920, and served one two-year term. He did not run for re-election, but became chief legal counsel for the Cleveland Automobile Club in 1923. On April 5, 1924, Ohio Governor A. Victor Donahey appointed Weygandt to the Cuyahoga County Court of Common Pleas. He ran successfully that November for the remaining four years of the term, and for a full six-year term in 1928.

In November, 1930 Weygandt was elected to complete a term on the Ohio 8th District Court of Appeals. He had served two years when he ran for Chief Justice of the Ohio Supreme Court as the Democratic nominee against incumbent Republican Carrington T. Marshall. He won in the Democratic landslide of 1932. He was re-elected in 1938, 1944, 1950 and 1956.

Weygandt ran unopposed in the May, 1962 Democratic primary, and faced fellow justice Kingsley A. Taft in the general election. This was the first instance of a sitting Justice of the Ohio Supreme Court challenging an incumbent chief justice. Taft defeated Weygandt in a close election.

Weygandt married Jessie May Silver of Wooster on June 14, 1915. They raised three children. Weygandt died from a stroke September 4, 1964. The funeral was at Lakewood Methodist Episcopal Church, and burial was at Wooster Cemetery.

He was a member of the Delta Tau Delta and Delta Theta Phi college fraternities, Ebenezer Lodge 33 of Free and Accepted Masons, and the I.O.O.F.
