= Deborah L. Cook =

American judge (born 1952)

Deborah Cook
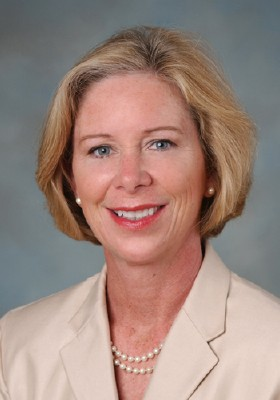

Senior Judge of the United States Court of Appeals for the Sixth Circuit
- Incumbent
- Assumed office March 6, 2019

Judge of the United States Court of Appeals for the Sixth Circuit
- In office May 7, 2003 – March 6, 2019
- Appointed by: George W. Bush
- Preceded by: Alan Eugene Norris
- Succeeded by: Chad Readler

Justice of the Ohio Supreme Court
- In office January 1, 1995 – May 16, 2003
- Preceded by: A. William Sweeney
- Succeeded by: Terrence O'Donnell

Personal details
- Born: February 8, 1952 (age 74) Pittsburgh, Pennsylvania, U.S.
- Party: Republican
- Education: University of Akron (BA, JD)

Deborah Louise Cook (born February 8, 1952) is a senior United States circuit judge of the United States Court of Appeals for the Sixth Circuit, based in Akron, Ohio. She served as a justice of the Ohio Supreme Court from 1995 to 2003.

== Background ==
Cook received her High School education at Crafton High School, near Pittsburgh, Pa., graduating in 1970. She earned her Bachelor of Arts degree from the University of Akron and her Juris Doctor from the University of Akron School of Law. She was president of Delta Gamma sorority and president of her senior class at the University of Akron. She is a member of the Omicron Delta Kappa leadership and academic honorary society.

Following graduation from law school until her election to the Ohio Ninth District Court of Appeals, Cook was a member of Akron's oldest law firm, Roderick, Myers & Linton, as well as the firm's first female partner. She then served four years as a state appellate judge on the District Court of Appeals covering Summit, Wayne, Medina, and Lorain counties. Cook was elected to the Ohio Supreme Court in 1994 for a six-year term beginning in 1995. She was re-elected in November 2000 and served until her appointment to the Sixth Circuit in 2003.

Cook chaired the Commission on Public Legal Education, and was a member of the Ohio Courts Futures Commission and the Ohio Commission on Dispute Resolution and Conflict Management. In 1996, the University of Akron presented her with an Honorary Doctor of Laws degree. She is a past president of the Akron Bar Association Foundation, a fellow of the American Bar Foundation, and was a member of the Akron Bar Association disciplinary committee from 1981 to 1993. Cook's past community activities include: Ohio Commission on Dispute Resolution and Conflict Management; Summit County United Way Board of Trustees; President of Volunteer Center Board of Trustees, Women's Network Board of Directors and past chair of the Junior Leadership Akron Project. She currently co-chairs Collegescholars, Inc, a mentored scholarship program benefiting disadvantaged Akron students. Cook is noted as being the only woman ever to play on the all-male Sharon Golf Club's course.

== Federal judicial service ==
President George W. Bush nominated Cook to the Sixth Circuit on May 9, 2001 to a seat vacated by Judge Alan Eugene Norris, who assumed senior status on July 1, 2001. That nomination, made during the Democratic-controlled 107th Congress, never received a floor vote in the United States Senate. Cook was not confirmed until almost two years later. She was confirmed by the United States Senate on May 5, 2003 by a 66–25 vote. She received her commission on May 7, 2003. She assumed senior status on March 6, 2019, when her successor, Chad Readler, was confirmed by the Senate. Although she assumed inactive senior status on August 27, 2021, she was again hearing cases as of April 27, 2023.

As a Sixth Circuit Judge, she has authored notable opinions on the Fourth Amendment, Voting Rights, and school free speech.

In 2014 Cook voted to uphold gay marriage bans in Michigan, Kentucky, Ohio, and Tennessee in a 2-1 ruling. The ruling was the second to uphold gay marriage bans since the U.S. Supreme Court struck down the federal Defense of Marriage Act in 2013 and diverged with rulings by the U.S. Courts of Appeals for the 4th, 7th, 9th and 10th circuits, which then led the U.S. Supreme Court to grant writ of certiorari to review same-sex marriage bans when it previously declined to do so. In Obergefell v. Hodges the Supreme Court reversed the decision of the Sixth Circuit.

== Possible Supreme Court candidate ==
Cook was mentioned in 2005 as a possible nominee for the Supreme Court to replace Sandra Day O'Connor. O'Connor was eventually replaced with Samuel Alito, although Cook was mentioned as a possible nominee to the high court had Republican John McCain won the 2008 presidential election.

Legal offices
Preceded by Alan Eugene Norris	Judge of the United States Court of Appeals for the Sixth Circuit; 2003–2019	Succeeded by Chad Readler
