= James Garfield Stewart =

American judge (1880–1959)

38th Mayor of Cincinnati
- In office 1938–1947
- Preceded by: Russell Wilson
- Succeeded by: Carl W. Rich

Associate Justice of the Ohio Supreme Court
- In office March 5, 1947 – April 3, 1959
- Appointed by: Thomas J. Herbert
- Preceded by: Charles S. Bell
- Succeeded by: John Weld Peck II

Personal details
- Born: November 17, 1880 Springfield, Ohio, U.S.
- Died: April 3, 1959 (aged 78) Louisville, Kentucky, U.S.
- Resting place: Springfield, Ohio
- Party: Republican
- Spouse: Harriet L. Potter (divorced)
- Children: Potter, Zeph; Irene Potter Stewart Taylor
- Education: Kenyon College; Cincinnati Law School

James Garfield Stewart (November 17, 1880 – April 3, 1959) was an American Republican politician from Cincinnati, Ohio. He served as mayor of Cincinnati from 1938 to 1947 and then as justice on the Ohio Supreme Court from 1947 to 1959.

== Life and career ==
Stewart was born in Springfield, Ohio, the son of Mary Emily (Durbin) and James Eli Stewart, and graduated from Kenyon College in 1902. He graduated from Cincinnati Law School and was admitted to the bar in 1905. He opened a private practice in Springfield for three years before joining Hugh L. Nichols' firm in Cincinnati in 1908. He was elected to City Council in 1934, and was Mayor 1938–1947.

In 1944, Stewart won the Republican nomination for Ohio Governor by just 2,200 votes over Attorney General Thomas Herbert. He lost the general election to Frank Lausche.

March 5, 1947, Governor Thomas J. Herbert appointed Stewart to the seat on the Ohio Supreme Court vacated by the resignation of Charles S. Bell. He was elected in 1948, and re-elected in 1952 and 1958. He died April 3, 1959, after giving a speech in Kentucky. His funeral was at Christ Church in Cincinnati, with burial in Springfield.

Stewart and Harriet L. Potter were married in 1911, and later divorced.

== Family ==
Stewart's son Potter (1915–1985) was an Associate Justice of the United States Supreme Court.

Party political offices
Preceded by John W. Bricker	Republican Party nominee for Governor of Ohio; 1944	Succeeded by Thomas J. Herbert
