= Augustus N. Summers =

American judge

Augustus Neander Summers
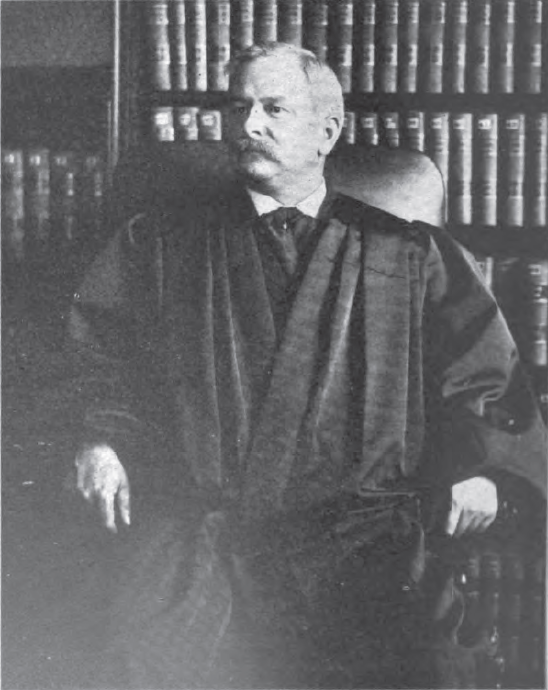

Associate Justice of the Ohio Supreme Court
- In office February 9, 1904 – January 1, 1911
- Preceded by: Jacob F. Burket
- Succeeded by: Maurice H. Donahue

Personal details
- Born: June 13, 1856 Shelby, Ohio
- Died: May 19, 1927 (aged 70) Springfield, Ohio
- Resting place: Ferncliff Cemetery, Springfield
- Party: Republican
- Spouse: Nellie Thomas
- Children: two
- Education: Wittenberg College
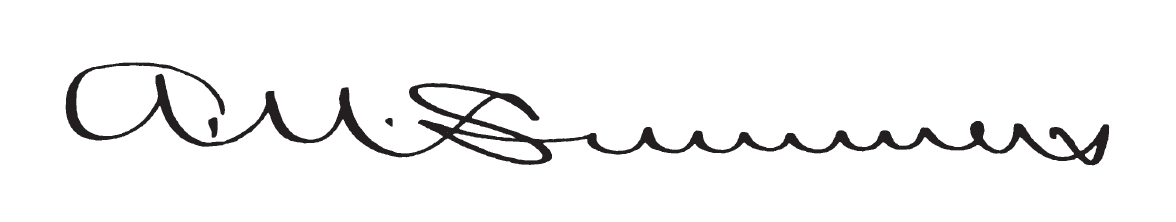
- Signature

Augustus Neander Summers (June 13, 1856 – May 19, 1927) was a Republican politician in the U.S. State of Ohio who was on the Ohio Supreme Court 1904–1911.

== Biography ==
Augustus N. Summers was born at Shelby, Richland County, Ohio. He graduated from Wittenberg College, where he was a member of Phi Kappa Psi, in 1879, and began study of law in Springfield, being admitted to the bar in 1881. He was elected city attorney in 1885 until 1891. He then was in private practice until 1894, when he was elected a judge on the second circuit.

Summers served as a judge on the Ohio Supreme Court from 1904 to 1911.

Following his electoral defeat in 1910, Summers returned to private practice in Springfield with his partner, George A. Beard. He died in Springfield May 21, 1927, after a lengthy illness, and is interred in Ferncliff cemetery.

Summers married Nellie Thomas of Springfield in 1887. They had two sons.

== See also ==
- List of justices of the Ohio Supreme Court
