= Robert Morton Duncan =

American judge (1927–2012)

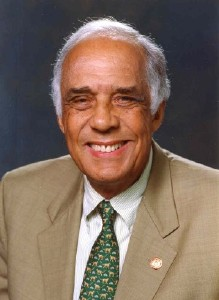

Judge of the United States District Court for the Southern District of Ohio
- In office June 20, 1974 – April 15, 1985
- Appointed by: Richard Nixon
- Preceded by: Carl Andrew Weinman
- Succeeded by: James L. Graham

Judge of the United States Court of Appeals for the Armed Forces
- In office 1971–1974
- Appointed by: Richard Nixon
- Preceded by: Homer S. Ferguson
- Succeeded by: Albert B. Fletcher Jr.

Associate Justice of the Ohio Supreme Court
- In office January 2, 1969 – November 26, 1971
- Appointed by: Jim Rhodes
- Preceded by: Paul W. Brown
- Succeeded by: Lloyd O. Brown

Personal details
- Born: Robert Morton Duncan; August 24, 1927 Urbana, Ohio
- Died: November 2, 2012 (aged 85)
- Party: Republican
- Education: Ohio State University (BS); Ohio State University Moritz College of Law (JD)

Robert Morton Duncan (August 24, 1927 – November 2, 2012) was a United States district judge of the United States District Court for the Southern District of Ohio.

== Education and career ==
Born on August 24, 1927, in Urbana, Ohio, Duncan received a Bachelor of Science degree from Ohio State University in 1948. He received a Juris Doctor from the Ohio State University Moritz College of Law in 1952. Duncan served in the United States Army in Korea 1952 to 1956. He was an attorney examiner for the Ohio Bureau of Workmen's Compensation from 1959 to 1960. He was city prosecutor for Columbus, Ohio from 1960 to 1963. He was chief counsel to the state attorney general of Ohio from 1963 to 1966. He was a judge of the Franklin County, Ohio Municipal Court from 1966 to 1968. He was a justice of the Ohio Supreme Court from 1968 to 1971.

== Federal judicial service ==
Duncan was a judge of the United States Court of Military Appeals (now the United States Court of Appeals for the Armed Forces) from 1971 to 1974.

Duncan was nominated by President Richard Nixon on May 1, 1974, to a seat on the United States District Court for the Southern District of Ohio vacated by Judge Carl Andrew Weinman. He was confirmed by the United States Senate on June 13, 1974, and received his commission on June 20, 1974. His service was terminated on April 15, 1985, due to his resignation.

== Post judicial service ==
Following his resignation from the federal bench, Duncan returned to private practice with the firm of Jones Day Reavis & Pogue.

== Firsts ==
Duncan was the first African-American elected to judicial office in Franklin County the first to serve on the Ohio Supreme Court, the first to serve on the United States Court of Military Appeals, and the first appointed to the federal bench in Ohio.

== Personal ==
Duncan married his wife Shirley in 1955. They had three children. In September 1978 members of the American White Nationalist Party, a local pro-segregation party, targeted Duncan and his family in retaliation for desegregation, and planned to bomb the Olde Orchard Elementary School where one of his children was in attendance. The plot was foiled by two police informants, who recorded the meeting.

Duncan died on November 2, 2012.

== See also ==
- List of African-American federal judges
- List of African-American jurists
- List of first minority male lawyers and judges in Ohio

== Sources ==
Legal offices
Preceded by Paul W. Brown	Ohio Supreme Court Justice; 1969–1971	Succeeded by Lloyd O. Brown
Preceded by Carl Andrew Weinman	Judge of the United States District Court for the Southern District of Ohio; 1974–1985	Succeeded by James L. Graham
