= Rankin Gibson =

American judge

Rankin MacDougal Gibson

Associate Justice of the Ohio Supreme Court
- In office January 1, 1963 – November 1964
- Appointed by: Michael DiSalle
- Preceded by: Kingsley A. Taft
- Succeeded by: Paul W. Brown

Personal details
- Born: October 9, 1916 Unionville, Missouri
- Died: June 4, 2001 (aged 84) West Jefferson, Ohio
- Party: Democratic
- Spouse: Eloise M. Corns
- Children: two
- Education: Northeast Missouri State Teachers College; University of Missouri School of Law; St. Paul College of Law; George Washington Law School

Rankin MacDougal Gibson (1916-2001) was a Democratic lawyer from Missouri who settled in Ohio. He occupied positions in the administration of Governor Michael DiSalle, and was appointed to the Ohio Supreme Court in 1963 and 1964.

Rankin Gibson was the son of Alexander and Murle Fletcher Gibson. He was born October 9, 1916, in Unionville, Missouri. He attended Northeast Missouri State Teachers College 1934 to 1936, and graduated from the University of Missouri School of Law in 1939. He passed the bar that year and opened a practice in Unionville. In 1940, he began working as an attorney for T.H. Mastin & Co., an insurance company in St. Louis, Missouri.

From 1945 to 1951, Gibson worked for the Veteran's Administration in Des Moines, Iowa, St. Paul, Minnesota, and Washington, D.C. He earned a bachelor of science in law from St. Paul College of Law in 1948 and a master of law from George Washington Law School in 1950. In 1951 he worked for the Wage Stabilization Board as an enforcement and litigation attorney. He also joined the faculty of the University of Toledo College of Law in 1951, working there until 1956. He was admitted to the Ohio bar in 1954.

In 1956, Gibson joined the Toledo, Ohio, firm DiSalle, Green, Haddad & Lynch. He moved to Columbus, Ohio, in 1959, to serve as assistant to Ohio Governor Michael DiSalle. For 1959 to 1961 he served on the Interstate Cooperation Committee and as chairman of the Governor's Committee on Public Information. He also taught at Franklin University School of Law. He was director of the Ohio Department of Commerce, a member of the Ohio Water Pollution Board, The Civil War Centennial Commission, and the Ohio Housing Board from 1961 to 1962. In 1963, he was named to head the Public Utilities Commission of Ohio.

In 1962, Kingsley A. Taft was elected Chief Justice of the Ohio Supreme Court, starting Jan 1, 1963. This created a vacancy on the court, to which Governor LaSalle appointed Gibson. He was required to run for the unexpired portion of Taft's term in November 1964, and lost to Republican Paul W. Brown.

Beginning in 1965, Gibson returned to private practice with Lucas, Predergast, Albright, Gibson and Newman. In 1972, he was president of the Ohio State Bar Association.

Rankin Gibson married Eloise M. Corns on September 13, 1941. They had two children. He lived in Galloway, Ohio and died on June 4, 2001, at West Jefferson, Ohio.
