= Richard T. Cole =

Richard Thomas Cole
- Born: January 1, 1948 (age 78)
- Known for: Co-founder of the Michigan Education Trust (MET); Press Secretary to James Blanchard
- Board member of: Huntington National Bank; Center for Michigan; Cranbrook Institute of Science
- Awards: WMU Distinguished Alumni Award (1987); Frank J. Stella Italian American of the Year (2000)

Academic background
- Education: Western Michigan University; Michigan State University

Academic work
- Discipline: Public relations, advertising, higher education
- Sub-discipline: Health communication, social media marketing
- Institutions: Michigan State University; Blue Cross Blue Shield of Michigan; Detroit Medical Center; Office of the Governor of Michigan

Richard Thomas Cole (born 1948) was full professor (retired in January 2014) and past chairperson of the Department of Advertising and Public Relations at Michigan State University. He serves on the advisory board for Huntington National Bank Inc. in Southeast Michigan and the steering committee of the Center for Michigan, Ann Arbor.

The former press secretary and chief of staff to Michigan governor James J. Blanchard, and former majority executive secretary in the Michigan State Senate, Cole rejoined the MSU faculty in 2006 after an absence of 15 years. During his absence from MSU, he served as an officer on two major Michigan-based health care corporations—Blue Cross and Blue Shield of Michigan (under CEO Richard Whitmer) as senior vice president in various capacities, and Detroit Medical Center (DMC) as executive vice president and chief administrative officer under then-CEO, now Detroit mayor, Mike Duggan.

A listing of Cole's most recent publications (books and journal articles) appears below.

== Education ==
Cole received his bachelor's degree (1969) in Psychology & Speech from Western Michigan University in Kalamazoo, Michigan. He holds a PhD. 1980 in Administration & Higher Education (Cognate: Communication) and a M.A. 1972 in Administration and Higher Education from Michigan State University. He is also a graduate of the Michigan Military Academy (Michigan National Guard Officer Candidate School), where he was commissioned as a United States Air Force Reserve officer.

== Personal life ==
Cole and his wife Deborah, a sculptor and potter, reside in a Haslett, Michigan solar-powered, earth-bermed home designed by Guy Kerr (with a strong Paolo Soleri influence). They have four grown daughters: Angela Klotz McCauslin, Chapin Deborah Cole, Rachel Carson Clugston and Katherine Elizabeth Cole.

== Government service ==
During the 1970s, Cole served as the majority executive secretary of the Michigan State Senate under State Senator William Fitzgerald (D-Detroit). Prior to this appointment, he was director of legislation and school law for the Michigan Department of Education under State Superintendent John W. Porter, following an appointment as staff assistant to the Senate Education and State Affairs Committees under State Senator Anthony Stamm (R-Kalamazoo).

From 1983 through 1988, Cole was the press secretary and later chief of staff for Governor James Blanchard. During this time, he conceptualized, and co-developed America's first pre-paid university tuition program (with State Treasurer Bob Bowman) – the Michigan Education Trust (MET). MET is based on an alumni-centered pre-paid tuition program offered at Duquesne University, Pittsburgh. He later served as MET President. (Honored as “Grandfather of MET” by Michigan Department of Treasury, 1988.)

In 1993, he was appointed to the Jacob K. Javits Fellowship Board in the U.S. Department of Education.

In 1994, Cole was appointed by Governor John Engler as Democratic co-chair of the Michigan commission created to improve customer service.

Cole was asked by then-Governor Granholm to chair the economic development agency's search for an agency to handle the $33 million state tourism and business-marketing contracts for the State of Michigan.

During her candidacy, Cole served as a volunteer advisor to Michigan Governor Gretchen Whitmer.

== Professional experience ==
Cole left Michigan State University in January, 2014, after having served for eight years as professor in the Advertising, Public Relations and Retailing department, which he chaired from 2006 to 2011. Earlier in his career, from 1988 to 1990, he was an associate professor at Michigan State University. He had left MSU to become vice president for university advancement of Ferris State University, Big Rapids, and left a year and a half later to join Richard Whitmer's leadership team at Blue Cross Blue Shield of Michigan (BCBSM). Between 1991 and 1994, Cole served as the vice president of corporate communications at Blue Cross Blue Shield of Michigan. In 1995, he became senior vice president at BCBSM, overseeing a number of the company's divisions, including a stint as chief operating officer of BCBSM subsidiary PPOM, and head of the company's "Creativity Center." Cole retired from BCBSM in 2004 to join Mike Duggan (then CEO, now Detroit mayor) at Detroit Medical Center (DMC) where he served as the executive vice president and chief administrative officer until rejoining MSU in 2006. Earlier in his career, Cole was a registered legislative agent with Public Affairs Associates, Lansing and he was the co-founder and chairman of Publicom Inc., an East Lansing, Michigan-based company.

== Public service ==
Cole recently (c.2017) completed a term as a member of the board of directors of Citizen's Research Council of Michigan, a privately funded non-profit research organization. He is also a founding steering committee member of the Center for Michigan, a "bi-partisan economic development think and do tank" in Ann Arbor. He served as a member of the Centers for Disease Control and Prevention (CDC) Knowledge-to-Action Consortium on Child Maltreatment Prevention, Atlanta, through the lifetime of this task force (2009–2012). From 1998 until 2002, Cole served as the chair of the board of governors for the Cranbrook Institute of Science. Between 2005 and 2008, he was the chair of the Metropolitan Detroit Division of the March of Dimes. In July, 1995, Crain's Detroit Business named Cole an "Executive Hero" for his contribution to a number of community organizations.

While at Michigan State University, Cole served on the University Academic Integrity Hearing Board 2012–2013 and on numerous other university and college committees.

== Publications ==
Cole is the co-author of three books on using social media for business and the non-profit sector: Google This: New Media Driver's License Resource Guide (with Derek Mehraban, 2013), The Social Current: Monitoring and Analyzing Conversations in Social Media (with Allie Siarto, 2013), and New Media Driver's License (r) -- Using Social Media for Business (2012, with Derek Mehraban).

He is a contributing author (of the chapter on health care communication) to the Handbook of Strategic Public Relations and Integrated Marketing, McGraw-Hill, 1997 (1st edition) and 2012 (2nd Edition). He was commissioned to write the entry "Abuse: Child and Spousal" for the Sage Encyclopedia of Health Communication, 2014. He also co-authored a chapter in the Handbook of Research on Effective Electronic Gaming in Education, Information Science Reference Publishing, with Elizabeth Quilliam in 2008, and numerous other publications (many listed below).

He was a monthly contributor to Dome Magazine; his columns can be found in the Dome archives under "Rick Cole At-large" (ca. 2008–11).

== Awards ==
Cole was selected for Western Michigan University's (Kalamazoo) Distinguished Alumni Award, 1987. In 1998, he was awarded the Executive of the Year Award from the Metropolitan Detroit Association of Health Plan Underwriters. He was named Frank J. Stella Italian American of the Year by the Detroit-area Italian American Center, 2000.
