= Herbert R. Brown =

American judge (born 1931)

Herbert Russell Brown

Associate Justice of the Ohio Supreme Court
- In office January 2, 1987 – January 1, 1993
- Preceded by: Clifford F. Brown
- Succeeded by: Paul E. Pfeifer

Personal details
- Born: September 27, 1931 (age 94) Columbus, Ohio, U.S.
- Party: Democratic
- Spouse: Beverly Ann Jenkins
- Children: two
- Education: Denison University; University of Michigan Law School

Herbert Russell Brown (born September 27, 1931) is an American lawyer and author from the state of Ohio who sat on the Ohio Supreme Court for six years, then devoted his time to writing fiction.

== Biography ==
Herbert Russell Brown was born in Columbus, Ohio on September 27, 1931, to Thomas Newton and Irene Hankinson Brown. He graduated from Denison University in 1953 with a bachelor's degree, and from the University of Michigan Law School in 1956, where he was Phi Alpha Delta and served on the Law Review 1955–1956.

Brown worked as associate attorney for a short time at Vorys, Sater, Seymour and Pease before joining the military. He served in the Judge Advocate General's Corps, United States Army 1957–1959, entering as a first lieutenant and leaving as a captain. He then returned to Vorys in 1960, became partner in 1965, and left the firm in 1982 to devote time to writing.

Brown ran for the 58th district of the Ohio House of Representatives, but was defeated. He was Federal Lands Commissioner 1967–1968, and Lake Lands Commissioner beginning in 1981. He was also an examiner with the Ohio State Bar from 1962 to 1972, the District Court Bar from 1968 to 1971, and the Multi-State Bar from 1971 to 1976.

In 1986, Brown entered the Democratic primary for the Ohio Supreme Court, and won nomination and election because of strong support from the Ohio AFL-CIO. He did not run for re-election, because he found a publisher for his first novel, Presumption of Guilt, in 1991, and decided to return to writing. His term ended January 1, 1993.

Brown wrote Shadows of Doubt in 1994, and seven produced plays. He also has taught as an adjunct professor at the Ohio State University College of Law from 1997 to 2001. He was married to Beverly Anne Jenkins in 1967, and has two sons.

== Publications ==
- Brown, Herbert (1992). Presumption of Guilt. Penguin. ISBN 978-0-515-10826-2.
- Brown, Herbert (1994). Shadows of doubt: a novel. Donald I. Fine. ISBN 978-1-55611-394-9.
