= Jacob F. Burket =

American judge and politician (1837–1906)

Jacob Fillmore Burket
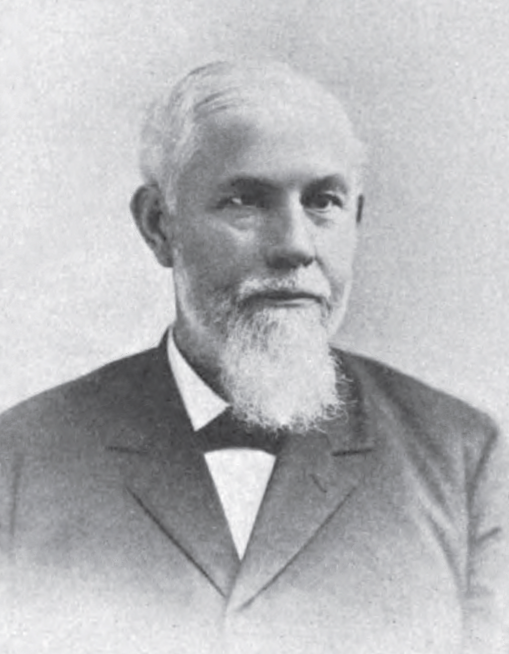

Associate Justice of the Ohio Supreme Court
- In office February 9, 1893 – February 9, 1904
- Preceded by: new seat
- Succeeded by: Augustus N. Summers

Personal details
- Born: March 25, 1837 Somerset, Ohio
- Died: October 9, 1906 (aged 69) Findlay, Ohio
- Resting place: Maple Grove Cemetery, Findlay
- Party: Republican
- Spouse: Pamelia Delight Walters
- Children: Six

Jacob Fillmore Burket (March 25, 1837 – October 9, 1906) was a Republican politician in the U.S. State of Ohio who was an Ohio Supreme Court Judge 1893–1904.

== Biography ==
Burket was born in Perry County, Ohio, on a farm near Somerset. In 1839, his family moved to Hancock County, where he worked on a farm and attended country schools. At age seventeen, he was apprenticed to his brother-in-law in Findlay to learn the carpenter's trade. In 1855, he began teaching school, and in 1859, graduated from an academy in Republic in Seneca County.

Burket was admitted to the bar July 1, 1861, and commenced practice at Ottawa, Ohio. He moved to Findlay in 1862, and practiced there until elected to the Supreme Court.

In 1892, the Ohio Legislature increased the membership of the Supreme Court from five members to six. Burket was nominated by the Republicans to the new seat, and defeated Democrat Thomas Beer by fewer than 2000 votes of 800,000 cast. He served a five-year term and was re-elected in 1897, this time to a six-year term. He served until February 1904.

Judge Burket was married to Pamy D. Walters of Adrian, Michigan, in 1859. They had six children. From 1873 to 1887, Burket was attorney and director of the First National Bank of Findlay. Burket was a Lutheran and member of the Odd Fellows, serving as Ohio Grand Master in 1883. He was a presidential elector for Garfield/Arthur in 1880. He died October 9, 1906, in Findlay from Bright's disease, and is buried in Maple Grove Cemetery in Findlay.

== See also ==
- List of justices of the Ohio Supreme Court

== Notes ==
Legal offices
Preceded by new seat	Associate Justice of the Ohio Supreme Court; 1893–1904	Succeeded by Augustus N. Summers
