= Roy Hughes Williams =

American judge

Justice of the Ohio Supreme Court
- In office November 1934 – December 18, 1946
- Preceded by: Howard Landis Bevis
- Succeeded by: Robert M. Sohngen

Personal details
- Born: September 1, 1874 Milan, Ohio
- Died: December 18, 1946 (aged 72) Columbus, Ohio
- Resting place: Milan Cemetery, Milan, Ohio
- Party: Republican
- Spouse: L. Verna Lockwood
- Education: Oberlin College; University of Michigan Law School

Military service
- Allegiance: United States
- Branch/service: United States Army
- Battles/wars: World War I

Roy Hughes Williams (September 1, 1874 – December 18, 1946) was a lawyer from the U.S. State of Ohio who served as a prosecutor, local and appellate judge, and was a justice of the Supreme Court of Ohio from 1934 until his death.

== Biography ==
Roy Hughes Williams was born September 1, 1874, in Milan, Ohio, son of Charles Ronald and Helen Hortense (Hughes) Williams. He graduated from Milan High School in 1890, attended the Western Reserve Normal School in Milan, and graduated from Oberlin Preparatory School in 1891. He attended Oberlin College for one or two years, and graduated from University of Michigan Law School with a Bachelor of Laws degree in 1897. He was admitted to the bar of Ohio in 1897.

Williams was married to L. Verna Lockwood on December 7, 1898. They had no children.

Williams won his first election for Erie County, Ohio prosecuting attorney in 1900 for a three-year term, and won re-election in 1903. He served January 1901 to January 1907, opting not to run for a third term. He prosecuted bridge contractors under the state's Anti-trust act for bid rigging.

Williams was in private practice in Sandusky, Ohio until he won election to the Erie County Common Pleas court in 1914, with term beginning January 1, 1915. He took a leave of absence as a 44-year-old to enlist in the United States Army during World War I. He served at Camp Zachary Taylor in Kentucky. Williams returned to the bench after his discharge, and was the first judge in Ohio to impanel a jury of twelve women on August 26, 1920.

Williams was elected to the Ohio Sixth District Court of Appeals in 1924, and was re-elected in 1930. He ran for the Supreme Court of Ohio in November 1934 as a Republican, to fill an un-expired term, and defeated Howard Landis Bevis, who had been appointed after Justice Reynolds R. Kinkade resigned. He won a full six-year term in 1936, defeating Will P. Stephenson. He would be re-elected on November 3, 1942.

Williams missed much of the 1945 session of the court due to ill health, but recovered enough to work in the fall 1946 term. He died of a heart attack, while drafting an opinion, on December 18, 1946, and had a funeral at the Old First Presbyterian Church in Sandusky, with burial in Milan Cemetery in Milan, Ohio.

Williams was a member of the Masons, B.P.O.E., Kiwanis, Beneficial Union of Sandusky, and American Legion.
