= William B. Caldwell (judge) =

American judge

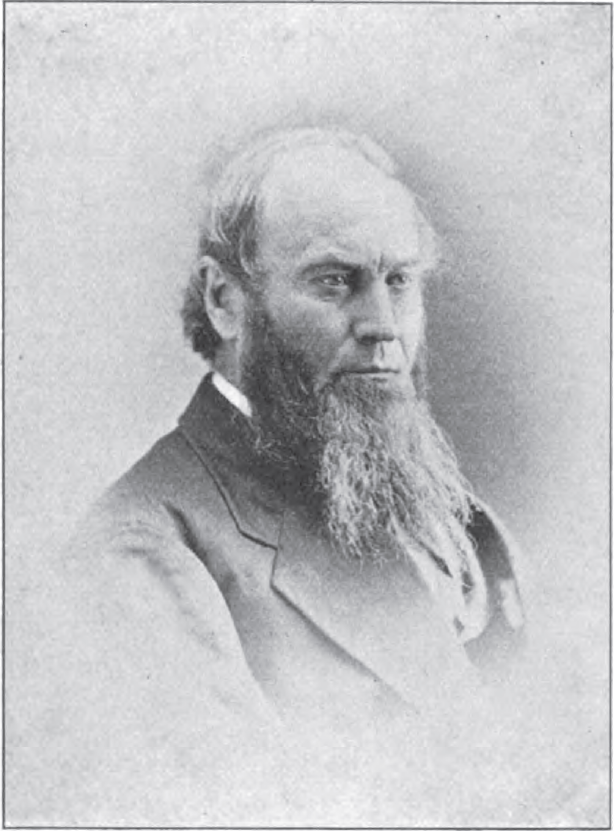

Justice of the Ohio Supreme Court
- In office March 7, 1849 – November 23, 1854
- Preceded by: Matthew Birchard
- Succeeded by: William Kennon Sr.

Personal details
- Born: June 3, 1808 Butler County, Ohio
- Died: March 21, 1876 (aged 67) Cincinnati, Ohio
- Resting place: Spring Grove Cemetery
- Party: Democratic
- Spouse: Agnes Corry
- Children: three
- Education: Miami University

William B. Caldwell (June 3, 1808 – March 21, 1876) was a Democratic Party jurist in the U.S. state of Ohio who sat on the Ohio Supreme Court 1849–1854.

William B. Caldwell was born on a Butler County, Ohio farm, where he stayed his first 21 years. He entered Miami University at Oxford, Ohio in 1830, and graduated in 1835. He studied law under John Woods of Hamilton, Ohio, and was admitted to the bar in 1837. He began practice in Xenia, Ohio and moved to Cincinnati, Ohio the next year. There he formed a partnership with General Samuel F. Cary.

In 1841 Caldwell was elected Prosecuting Attorney of Hamilton County, Ohio, and in 1842, President Judge of the Court of Common Pleas of that county. He held that position until 1849, when the Ohio General Assembly elected him to the Ohio Supreme Court. In autumn 1851, a new constitution of the state made judges elective, and Caldwell received the most votes among 11 candidates for five positions on the court. The five winners drew lots, and Caldwell was assigned a one-year term. He was re-elected in 1852 to a five-year term.

Caldwell resigned his seat in December, 1854, and resumed his practice in Cincinnati. Caldwell was married to Agnes Corry of Cincinnati in 1844, and was survived by a son of the same name. He died at Cincinnati March 21, 1876. He was buried at Spring Grove Cemetery.

Caldwell married Agnes Corry on January 3, 1844. They had three children.
