= Robert E. Holmes =

American judge

Robert Edward Holmes

Member of the Ohio House of Representatives from the 58th district
- In office January 3, 1961 – December 31, 1968
- Preceded by: At Large Districts
- Succeeded by: Larry Hughes

Ohio Supreme Court Associate Justice
- In office December 11, 1978 – December 31, 1992
- Appointed by: Jim Rhodes
- Preceded by: Frank Celebrezze
- Succeeded by: Francis E. Sweeney

Personal details
- Born: November 14, 1922 Columbus, Ohio
- Died: July 28, 2004 (aged 81) Powell, Ohio
- Party: Republican
- Spouse(s): Marjory Jean Holmes; Patricia S. Mishey
- Children: two
- Education: Ohio University; Moritz College of Law

Robert Edward Holmes (November 14, 1922 – July 28, 2004) was an associate justice of the Ohio Supreme Court from 1978 until 1992. A conservative jurist, he had previously represented his native Franklin County in the Ohio House of Representatives from 1961 until 1968 and on Ohio Tenth District Court of Appeals from 1968 until 1978 when he moved to the Supreme Court and was replaced on the Appeals Court bench by Thomas J. Moyer.

In 1978, Governor Rhodes appointed Holmes to the seat on the Supreme Court vacated when Frank Celebrezze was elected as chief justice. He won election to six-year terms in 1980 and 1986, but was prevented from running again in 1992, because the new term would not begin until after his 70th birthday, the mandatory age limit to begin a term on the court.

He was a graduate of Ohio University where he was a member of Phi Kappa Tau fraternity and the Ohio State University's Moritz College of Law.

Holmes married Marjory Jean Holmes on August 23, 1952, and they had two sons. She died in 1977. Holmes later married Patricia S. Mishey, who died in 1999. Holmes died at home in Powell, Ohio in 2004.

Justice Holmes lived by very strict judicial principles and those were seen in his judicial philosophy. His term on the Court enabled him to have a profound impact on the jurisprudence of Ohio.

— Chief Justice Thomas J. Moyer, 2005
