= Josiah Scott (politician) =

American judge

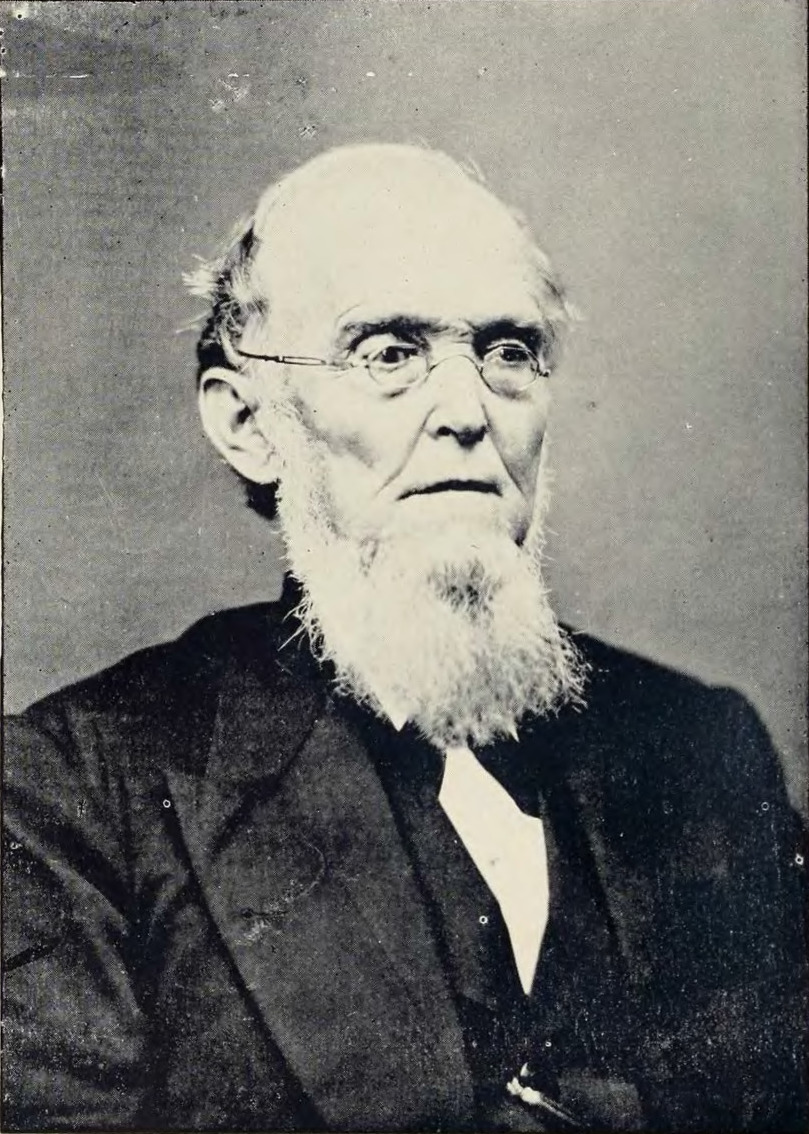

Justice of the Ohio Supreme Court
- In office November 29, 1856 – February 9, 1872
- Appointed by: Salmon P. Chase
- Preceded by: Rufus P. Ranney
- Succeeded by: William H. West

Member of the Ohio House of Representatives from the Delaware & Crawford Counties district
- In office December 7, 1840 – December 5, 1841 Serving with Emer Moore
- Preceded by: Andrew H. Patterson
- Succeeded by: James Griffith, Thomas W. Powell, George W. Sharp

Personal details
- Born: December 1, 1803 Washington County, Pennsylvania, US
- Died: June 15, 1879 (aged 75) Bucyrus, Ohio, US
- Resting place: Oakwood Cemetery, Bucyrus
- Party: Republican
- Other political affiliations: Whig
- Spouse(s): Elizabeth McCracken; Susan Elizabeth Moffit
- Children: five
- Education: Jefferson College

Josiah Scott (December 1, 1803 – June 15, 1879) was a Republican politician in the U.S. State of Ohio who was in the Ohio House of Representatives, and was an Ohio Supreme Court Judge 1856–1872.

Josiah Scott was born at Washington County, Pennsylvania, not far from Cannonsburg, where he graduated from Jefferson College (now Washington & Jefferson College) in 1823. He returned to Jefferson College as a tutor from 1827 to 1829. He studied law and in 1830 he moved to Bucyrus, Crawford County, Ohio, where he practiced law.

In 1840, Scott was elected to the Ohio House of Representatives for the 39th General Assembly as a Whig. Presidential elector in 1844 for Clay/Frelinghuysen.

In 1856, Scott was nominated by the Republican Party for Judge of the Ohio Supreme Court, and he defeated incumbent Democrat Rufus P. Ranney and a third party candidate with a plurality of the votes in the General Election. Ranney resigned the seat soon after the election, and Scott was seated late in 1856. He was re-elected in 1861, and again in 1866, but declined re-nomination in 1871.

In 1870, Scott developed a method to construct magic squares.

In 1872, Scott returned to Crawford County, and private practice. In 1876, Governor Hayes appointed him to the Supreme Court Commission of Ohio, and he resigned at the end of a three-year term in 1879.

Scott married Elizabeth McCracken on February 8, 1838. They had five children before she died in 1844. Scott married again May 4, 1846, to Susan Elizabeth Moffit, who had no children and died in 1891. He died June 15, 1879, from kidney disease and was buried in Oakwood Cemetery, Bucyrus.
