= David Dudley Dowd Jr. =

American judge

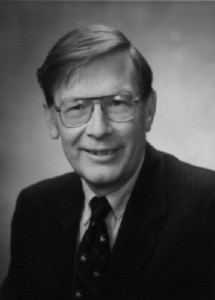

Senior Judge of the United States District Court for the Northern District of Ohio
- In office June 30, 1996 – August 4, 2016

Judge of the United States District Court for the Northern District of Ohio
- In office September 23, 1982 – June 30, 1996
- Appointed by: Ronald Reagan
- Preceded by: Leroy John Contie Jr.
- Succeeded by: Dan Polster

Associate Justice of the Ohio Supreme Court
- In office July 31, 1980 – January 1, 1981
- Appointed by: Jim Rhodes
- Preceded by: Thomas M. Herbert
- Succeeded by: Clifford F. Brown

Personal details
- Born: David Dudley Dowd Jr. January 31, 1929 Cleveland, Ohio, U.S.
- Died: August 4, 2016 (aged 87) Florida, U.S.
- Party: Republican
- Education: College of Wooster (B.A.); University of Michigan Law School (J.D.)

David Dudley Dowd Jr. (January 31, 1929 – August 4, 2016) was a United States district judge of the United States District Court for the Northern District of Ohio in Akron, Ohio.

== Education and career ==
Born in Cleveland, Ohio, Dowd received a Bachelor of Arts degree from College of Wooster in 1951 and a Juris Doctor from the University of Michigan Law School in 1954. He was in private practice in Massillon, Ohio from 1954 to 1955. He was in the United States Army from 1955 to 1957 with the Judge Advocate General's Corps, returning to private practice in Massillon from 1957 to 1975. After active service in the army, he transferred to the reserves until he retired as major in 1970.

He was a Councilman-at-large for the City of Massillon in 1960, and an assistant prosecuting attorney of Stark County, Ohio from 1961 to 1967, and prosecuting attorney of Stark County, Ohio 1967 to 1975. He was defeated in the Republican Primary for Ohio Attorney General in 1974. He was a judge on the Ohio Fifth District Court of Appeals from 1975 to 1980. He was a justice of the Ohio Supreme Court from 1980 to 1981. He was in private practice in Canton, Ohio from 1981 to 1982.

== Federal judicial service ==
On August 24, 1982, was nominated by President Ronald Reagan to a seat on the United States District Court for the Northern District of Ohio vacated by Judge Leroy John Contie Jr. Dowd was confirmed by the United States Senate on September 22, 1982, and received his commission the following day, taking up a duty station with chambers in Akron. He assumed senior status on June 30, 1996, serving in that status until his death on August 4, 2016, in Florida, though he had stopped hearing cases in 2014.

== Personal ==
Dowd had a spouse named Joyce, and they had a daughter and three sons.

== Sources ==
Legal offices
Preceded by Leroy John Contie Jr.	Judge of the United States District Court for the Northern District of Ohio; 1982–1996	Succeeded by Dan Polster
