= Clifford F. Brown =

American judge (1916–2011)

Clifford Francis Brown

Associate Justice of the Ohio Supreme Court
- In office January 2, 1981 – January 1, 1987
- Preceded by: David Dudley Dowd, Jr.
- Succeeded by: Herbert R. Brown

Personal details
- Born: January 21, 1916 Huron County, Ohio
- Died: January 14, 2011 (aged 94) Sandusky, Ohio
- Resting place: St. Paul Cemetery, Norwalk
- Party: Democratic
- Spouse: Katharine
- Children: five
- Education: University of Notre Dame

Clifford Francis Brown (January 21, 1916 – January 14, 2011) was a judge in the U.S. State of Ohio who was a justice of the Ohio Supreme Court 1981–1987.

== Biography ==
Clifford F. Brown was born in Huron County, Ohio on January 21, 1916, to Ignatius and Minnie Brown. He entered the University of Notre Dame at age 16, and graduated in 1936. He received a law degree from Notre Dame in 1938 at age 22.

After passing the Ohio bar exam, Brown returned to Norwalk, Ohio, where he practiced law from 1938 to 1964. He interrupted his practice during World War II to serve in the U.S. Army as a legal clerk from 1943 to 1946.

Brown was elected to a county court judgeship for a short term of one year in 1957, and was re-elected to four year terms in 1958 and 1962. In 1964, Brown was elected to the Sixth District Court of Appeals, and was re-elected in 1970. He ran for seats on the Ohio Supreme Court as a Democrat in 1966, 1974, and 1978, losing each time. He finally defeated David Dudley Dowd, Jr. in 1980, and was seated January 2, 1981, for a six-year term.

Brown turned seventy in 1986, and was barred by Ohio age limits from seeking another term. He finished his term January 1, 1987, and returned with his wife, Katharine, to Norwalk. Katharine died in 1992. The Browns had five children.

Brown died at hospice in Sandusky, Ohio, January 14, 2011. His burial was at St. Paul Catholic Church in Norwalk.
