= J. Craig Wright =

American judge

Justice of the Ohio Supreme Court
- In office January 2, 1985 – March 6, 1996
- Preceded by: James Celebrezze
- Succeeded by: Evelyn Lundberg Stratton

Personal details
- Born: June 21, 1929 Chillicothe, Ohio, US
- Died: February 3, 2010 (aged 80) Palm Springs, California, US
- Resting place: Forest Lawn Cemetery, Columbus, Ohio, US
- Party: Republican
- Spouse: Jane LaFollette
- Children: 2
- Education: University of Kentucky; Yale Law School

Military service
- Allegiance: United States
- Branch/service: United States Army
- Years of service: 1955-1956

J. Craig Wright (June 21, 1929 – February 3, 2010) was an American jurist, lawyer, and Republican justice of the Ohio Supreme Court who served in that office from 1985 to 1996.

Through his marriage to Jane LaFollette, Wright was connected to the Hatfields of West Virginia, descendants of William Anderson "Devil Anse" Hatfield of Hatfield–McCoy feud fame, and the LaFollette family, a political dynasty with roots in West Virginia and across the United States. His extended family also includes Vice President J.D. Vance through the Hatfield–Vance line.

Wright was born June 21, 1929, in Chillicothe, Ohio to Harry Jr. and Marjorie Riddle Wright and raised in Lima, Ohio. He graduated from Woodberry Forest School in 1947, earned a Bachelor of Arts degree from the University of Kentucky in 1951 and received his Juris Doctor from Yale Law School in 1954, where he received a golf scholarship.

From 1955 through 1956, he served as a special agent in the U.S. Army Counter Intelligence Corps. Upon completion of his military service, he entered private practice with the law firm of Wright, Gilbert and Jones in Columbus, Ohio.

== Judicial career ==
In 1970, Wright was elected to the Franklin County Court of Common Pleas, where he served for fourteen years, including terms as administrative and presiding judge. In 1984, he defeated incumbent Justice James P. Celebrezze and was elected to the Ohio Supreme Court, taking office on January 2, 1985. He was re-elected in 1990 and served until March 6, 1996.

On the bench, Wright was part of a conservative majority that emphasized legislative intent and precedent. While he generally supported capital punishment, he dissented in State v. Berry (1995), citing concerns about the execution of defendants with significant mental illness.

Following his retirement, Wright entered private practice in Columbus, Ohio. He retired from private practice in 2003 and served by assignment of the Chief Justice on the Ohio Court of Claims through 2009.

== Work on substance abuse and recovery ==
Wright's most enduring legacy was his work in addressing substance abuse and addiction within the legal system. Recognizing the toll that alcoholism and drug dependency were taking on lawyers and judges, he became an early advocate for recovery programs in the judiciary.

- He chaired or served on statewide and national bodies including the Ohio Recovery Council, the American Bar Association's Committee on Death Penalty Issues, and the Ohio Committee on Impaired Lawyers.
- Wright was instrumental in founding Ohio's Lawyers Assistance Program, one of the earliest state initiatives designed to provide confidential treatment resources, peer support, and rehabilitation opportunities for impaired legal professionals.
- His advocacy extended beyond lawyers, as he promoted treatment-oriented approaches for criminal defendants suffering from addiction, aligning with the broader national movement toward drug courts and rehabilitation as alternatives to incarceration.
- Following his retirement from the Supreme Court, he continued this work as a member of the Ohio Chemical Dependency Professionals Board (2003–2006), which licensed and regulated counselors and social workers in addiction treatment, and as a commissioner for the Ohio Public Defender Commission where he pushed for resources for indigent defendants facing substance-related issues.

Chief Justice Thomas J. Moyer later praised Wright not only as “an extraordinary jurist” but also as a pioneer in integrating recovery into the justice system, noting that his efforts helped destigmatize treatment for addiction among both professionals and defendants.

== Public service and reform ==
Wright was a leading advocate for addressing substance abuse and impairment in the legal profession. He chaired and served on committees including the Ohio Recovery Council, the American Bar Association's Committee on Death Penalty Issues, and Ohio's Committee on Impaired Lawyers.

== Personal life ==
Wright married Jane LaFollette, who connected him by marriage to both the Hatfield and LaFollette families.

Wright's sister, Patricia Wright Klitgaard, was married to Thomas Klitgaard, a businessman and philanthropist.

Wright and Jane LaFollette had two daughters, Marjorie Jane and Alice Ann, and three grandchildren.

== Death and legacy ==
Wright died on February 3, 2010, in Palm Springs, California, and was buried in Forest Lawn Cemetery, Columbus, Ohio. Chief Justice Thomas J. Moyer described him as “an extraordinary jurist,” highlighting both his legal intellect and his pioneering work on addiction recovery within the legal profession.
