= William Wartenbee Johnson =

American judge (1826–1887)

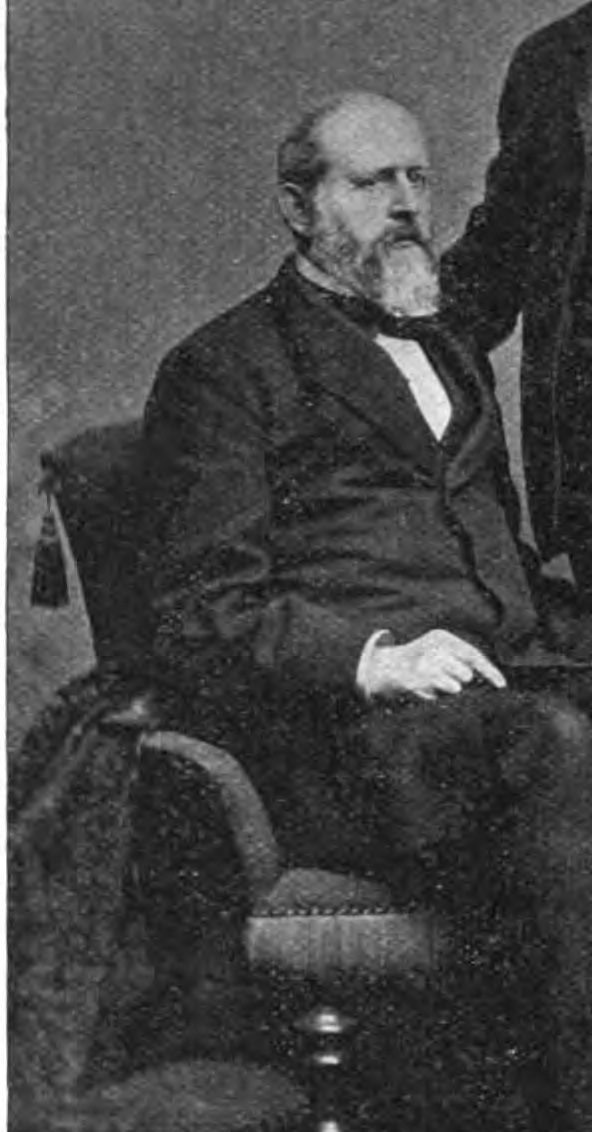

Associate Justice of the Ohio Supreme Court
- In office February 9, 1880 – November 9, 1886
- Preceded by: William J. Gilmore
- Succeeded by: Franklin J. Dickman

Personal details
- Born: August 26, 1826 Washington County, Pennsylvania
- Died: March 2, 1887 (aged 60) Ironton, Ohio
- Resting place: Woodland Cemetery
- Party: Republican
- Spouse: Martha Ella Blockson
- Relations: Elias Finley Johnson (nephew)
- Children: 2
- Education: Muskingum College

William Wartenbee Johnson (August 26, 1826 – March 2, 1887) was an American politician and judge who served as Associate justice of the Supreme Court of Ohio from 1880 to 1886.

== Biography ==
Johnson was born in Muskingum County, Ohio near ChandlersvilleAugust 26 or August 17, 1826. He was the third son of Solomon Johnson, originally from Connecticut, and Elizabeth Wartenbee, a Virginia native. He attended neighborhood schools, and graduated from and later taught at Muskingum College in New Concord. In 1849, he began study of law at the office of Charles Cleveland Convers, then Speaker of the Ohio Senate, and later on the Ohio Supreme Court. In 1852, he was admitted to the bar, and began practice at Ironton, Ohio.

In 1858, Johnson was elected Judge of the Common Pleas, and served until 1866. In 1868, he was re-elected, but resigned in 1872 due to ill health. In 1874, he was the Republican nominee for Supreme Court Judge, but lost to Democrat George Rex. In 1876, Governor Hayes appointed him a member of the first Supreme Court Commission of Ohio, serving until 1879. In 1876, he was also appointed a trustee of Ohio University.

In 1879, Johnson was again nominated by the Republicans for Supreme Court Judge, and defeated incumbent Democrat William J. Gilmore. Johnson was re-elected in 1884, but resigned November 9, 1886 due to ill health. He died March 2, 1887. He died at Ironton, and is buried at Woodland Cemetery.

On October 26, 1854, Johnson married Ella Blocksom, daughter of judge William Blocksom of Zanesville. They had two children, one of whom survived. Johnson was a Royal Arch Mason.

== Notes ==
Legal offices
Preceded by William J. Gilmore	Associate Justice of the Ohio Supreme Court; 1880–1886	Succeeded by Franklin J. Dickman
