= Thomas M. Herbert =

American judge

Thomas Morgan Herbert

Associate Justice of the Ohio Supreme Court
- In office January 1, 1969 – July 31, 1980
- Preceded by: Paul M. Herbert
- Succeeded by: David Dudley Dowd, Jr.

Personal details
- Born: December 1, 1927 Columbus, Ohio, U.S.
- Died: February 23, 2014 (aged 86) Columbus, Ohio, U.S.
- Party: Republican
- Spouse: Patricia Mae Harris
- Children: two
- Education: Ohio State University; Ohio State University College of Law
- Awards: Air Medal with cluster

Military service
- Allegiance: United States
- Branch/service: United States Air Force
- Years of service: 1951–1955

Thomas Morgan Herbert (December 1, 1927 – February 23, 2014) was a Republican lawyer from Ohio who was elected twice to the Ohio Supreme Court, succeeding his father in the seat.

== Background ==
Thomas Herbert was born at Columbus, Ohio on December 1, 1927, to Paul Morgan & Ruby Thomas Herbert. His father had been a member of the Ohio House of Representatives, and was in the Ohio Senate. He would later be Ohio Lieutenant Governor, and sit on the Ohio Supreme Court. Thomas Herbert graduated with a bachelor's degree from The Ohio State University in 1950. He entered the United States Air Force in 1951, earned his wings in 1952, and flew 260 hours of combat in B-29s as a navigator during the Korean War, earning an Air Medal with cluster.

Herbert completed his military service in 1955, and entered the Ohio State University College of Law, earning a Bachelor of Laws and Juris doctor. He joined his father's law practice in 1957.

== Career ==
In 1960, Herbert was elected to the Ohio House of Representatives, where he was re-elected in 1962 and 1964. In 1966 he won election to the 10th District Court of Appeals of Ohio. His father announced he would retire from the Ohio Supreme Court, and not seek re-election in 1968. Thomas Herbert ran for the seat that year, and defeated Merrill D. Brothers. He won re-election in 1974.

In 1978, Herbert ran for Chief Justice of the Ohio Supreme Court, but lost to Democrat Frank Celebrezze. In 1979, Herbert announced he would not seek re-election in 1980, and he resigned his seat July 31, 1980. Governor Jim Rhodes appointed David Dudley Dowd, Jr. to the unexpired months of Herbert's term.

Herbert then joined the Columbus firm Porter, Wright, Morris, and Arthur. He was a judge of the Southern Bankruptcy Court from 1982 to 1984. He was married to Patricia Mae Harris in 1956 and they had two children. Herbert died February 23, 2014, at Columbus. He was preceded in death by his wife and survived by his children and four grandchildren.
