= Blanche Krupansky =

American judge

Blanche Ethel Krupansky

Ohio Supreme Court Associate Justice
- In office September 1, 1981 – January 10, 1983
- Appointed by: Jim Rhodes
- Preceded by: Paul W. Brown
- Succeeded by: James Celebrezze

Personal details
- Born: December 10, 1925 Cleveland, Ohio
- Died: April 14, 2008 (aged 82) Fairview Park, Ohio
- Party: Republican
- Spouse: Frank W. Vargo
- Relations: brother - Robert B. Krupansky
- Education: Flora Stone Mather College; Case Western Reserve University School of Law

Blanche Ethel Krupansky (December 10, 1925 – April 14, 2008) was a Cleveland, Ohio, United States judge who became the second woman to sit on the Ohio Supreme Court when she was appointed in 1981.

== Biography ==
Blanche Krupansky was born in Cleveland, Ohio, on December 10, 1925, to Frank and Ann Krupansky. She attended public schools and graduated from Flora Stone Mather College in Cleveland in 1947, and the Case Western Reserve University School of Law in 1948. She began private practice in 1949, and also served as assistant Attorney General during the term of Ohio Attorney General C. William O'Neill, and was assistant chief counsel to the Ohio Bureau of Workers' Compensation.

Krupansky served on the Cleveland Municipal Court from 1961 to 1969. She was elected to two successive six-year terms on the Cuyahoga County Court of Common Pleas in November 1968 and 1974. In 1976 she won election for a seat on the 8th District Court of Appeals.

In 1981, Paul W. Brown resigned from the Ohio Supreme Court, and Krupansky interviewed with Governor James A. Rhodes and a group of Republicans. Rhodes appointed her effective September 1, 1981. She was the second woman to sit on the high court, after Florence E. Allen in the 1920s and 1930s. Krupansky had to run for election for the remainder of Brown's term in November 1982, and lost to Democrat James Celebrezze, brother of the Chief Justice Frank Celebrezze.

Krupansky returned to the 8th District Court of Appeals in January 1983, when Governor Rhodes appointed her to a vacant seat. She won election to a six-year term in 1988 and retired in 1995. She also lectured at the Case Western School of Law and was a member of its board of governors. She was elected in 1981 to the Ohio Women's Hall of Fame.

Blanche Krupansky married fellow lawyer Frank W. Vargo on April 30, 1960. She died on April 14, 2008 at her suburban home in Fairview Park, Ohio. Her brother, Robert B. Krupansky, was also a judge.
