= Henry C. Whitman =

American judge (1819–1889)

Henry C. Whitman (1819 – Aug. 21, 1889) was a member of the Ohio Supreme Court Commission of 1876, appointed from Hamilton County, Ohio to address an overage of Ohio Supreme Court cases.

Whitman, a Democrat, had run for a seat on the Court in 1859, but was defeated by Republican William Y. Gholson.

Ohio Governor Rutherford B. Hayes appointed Whitman to the Commission on February 2, 1876, along with five other members. They served until the Commission was disbanded, in 1879.

An 1889 obituary of Whitman said that "he was the young associate and friend of the great legal stars that clustered there a third of a century ago, comprising Thomas Ewing, Sr., Hocking Hunter, and Henry Stanberry. He was a personal acquaintance and admirer of Henry Clay and had a legal acquaintance with Edwin M. Stanton, and was the intimate friend of Judge Allen G. Thurman. In fact, few men were better known than he to the Ohio bar during his early manhood".
