= Paul W. Brown =

American judge

Paul Wesley Brown

Associate Justice of the Ohio Supreme Court
- In office November 1964 – December 31, 1968
- Appointed by: Jim Rhodes
- Preceded by: Rankin Gibson
- Succeeded by: Robert Morton Duncan
- In office January 1, 1973 – August 31, 1981
- Preceded by: Lloyd O. Brown
- Succeeded by: Blanche Krupansky

41st Ohio Attorney General
- In office January 1969 – January 11, 1971
- Governor: Jim Rhodes
- Preceded by: William B. Saxbe
- Succeeded by: William J. Brown

Personal details
- Born: January 14, 1915 Cleveland, Ohio, U.S.
- Died: November 17, 2000 (aged 85) Sarasota, Florida, U.S.
- Party: Republican
- Spouse: Helen Page
- Children: seven
- Education: Ohio State University; Ohio State University College of Law

Paul Wesley Brown (January 14, 1915 – November 17, 2000) was a Republican lawyer in the U.S. state of Ohio who served two non consecutive terms as a justice of the Ohio Supreme Court sandwiched around being appointed Ohio Attorney General.

== Biography ==
Paul Wesley Brown was born at Cleveland, Ohio in 1915 to William and Mary E. Brown. He worked in a steel mill to support his education, receiving a bachelor's degree in 1937 from The Ohio State University, and a law degree in 1939 from Ohio State University College of Law. He entered private practice in Youngstown, Ohio with Falls, Hazel and Kerr.

In 1941, Brown volunteered as a lieutenant with the Reserve Field Artillery, and by 1942, he was a captain in the Armored Field Artillery, United States Army in North Africa. He returned stateside to recover from combat wounds after escaping an Italian prisoner-of-war camp, and was awarded a Silver Star and Purple Heart.

Brown returned to private practice in Youngstown with Williams, Andrews and Brown. He was on the faculty of Youngstown State University, and served as liaison between the school and the state government, as the school transitioned from private to public status.

== Judicial career ==
In 1960, Brown was elected to Ohio's 7th District Court of Appeals, and re-elected to a full term in 1962. He was elected to a short term on the Ohio Supreme Court in 1964, and to a full term in 1966.

In 1968, Ohio Attorney General William B. Saxbe was elected United States Senator. Saxbe resigned, and December 1968, Ohio Governor Jim Rhodes appointed Brown as attorney general. Brown entered the Republican primary for governor in 1970, but lost. His term as AG ended in January 1971.

Brown served as a trust officer for Ohio National Bank before returning to politics, winning election to the Supreme Court again in 1972, and re-election in 1978. He resigned August 31, 1981 to return to private practice in the Columbus office of Thompson, Hine and Flory of Cleveland.

== Death ==
Brown married Helen Page in 1942 and they had seven children. He died in 2000 in Sarasota, Florida.
