= 2022 Ohio elections =

- November 8, 2022

The 2022 Ohio general elections took place on November 8, 2022, throughout the US state of Ohio.

== Federal ==
=== Senate ===
Incumbent Republican senator Rob Portman announced he was retiring.

Republican and Democratic primaries were held on May 3, 2022. U.S. Senate 2022 candidates elected during the primary were Congressman Tim Ryan (D) and J.D. Vance (R). In the general election, Republican JD Vance won the open seat, defeating Democratic U.S. Representative Tim Ryan by 6.12%. Vance won 53% of the votes compared to Ryan's 47%.

=== House of Representatives ===
All of Ohio's 15 seats in the United States House of Representatives were up for election in 2022.

== Governor and lieutenant governor ==
Incumbent Republican governor Mike DeWine and lieutenant governor Jon Husted were re-elected to a second term, defeating Democratic governor candidate Nan Whaley and lieutenant governor candidate Cheryl Stephens.

== Attorney general ==
Incumbent Republican attorney general Dave Yost was re-elected to a second term defeating Democratic state Representative Jeff Crossman.

== Secretary of state ==
Ohio Secretary of State Frank LaRose was re-elected to a second term defeating Democrat Chelsea Clark.

== Treasurer ==
Incumbent Republican state treasurer Robert Sprague ran for re-election to a second term in office and was challenged by Democrat Scott Schertzer. Sprague easily won the general election.

=== Results ===
Ohio State Treasurer election, 2022
Party	Candidate	Votes	%
Republican	Robert Sprague (incumbent)	2,390,542	58.55%
Democratic	Scott Schertzer	1,692,160	41.45%
Total votes		4,082,702	100.00%
Republican hold			

== Auditor ==
2022 Ohio State Auditor election
- November 8, 2022
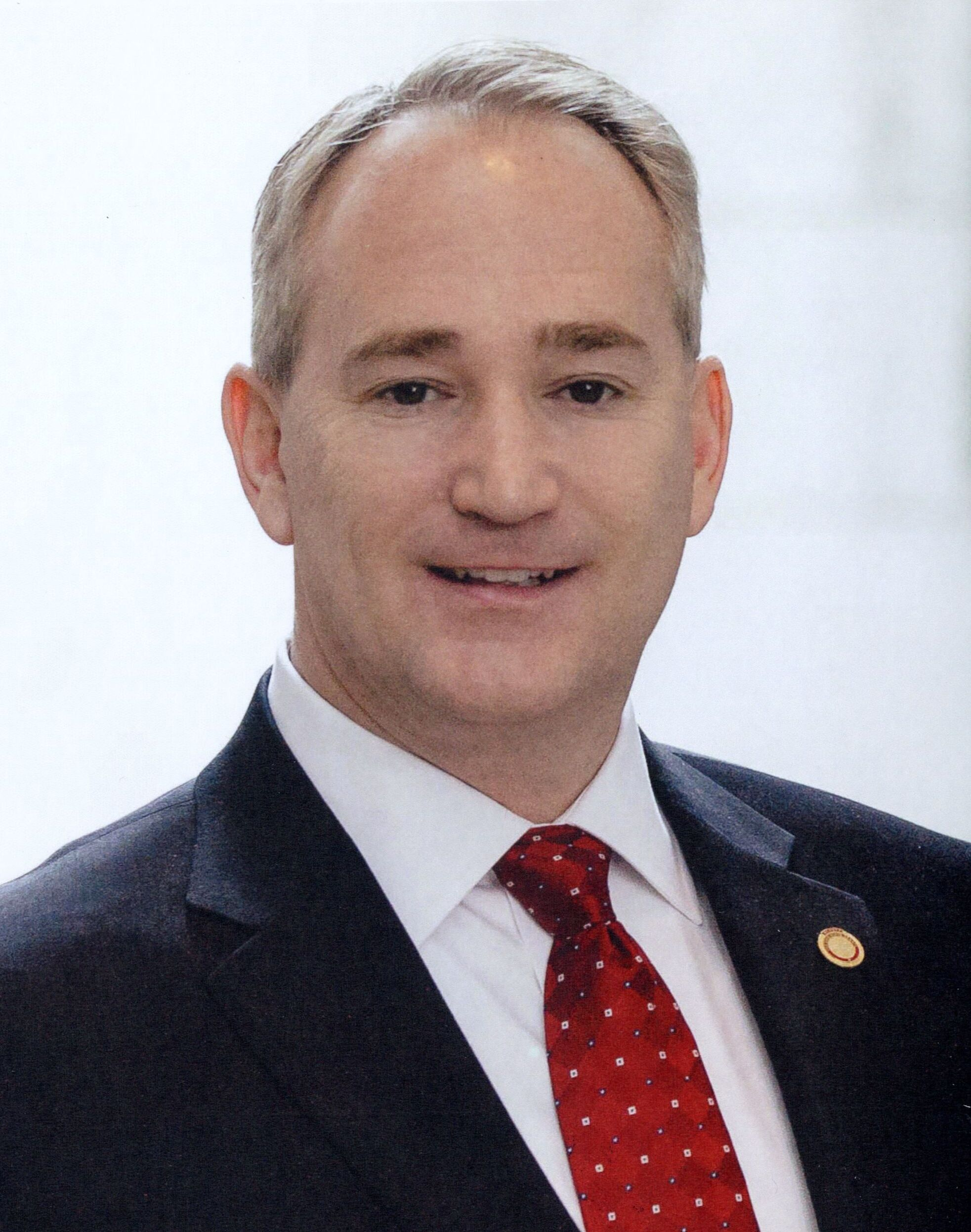

Nominee	Keith Faber	Taylor Sappington
Party	Republican	Democratic
Popular vote	2,397,207	1,683,216
Percentage	58.75%	41.25%
- Faber: 50–60% 60–70% 70–80% 80–90% Sappington: 50–60% 60–70% 70–80%
State Auditor before election
Keith Faber
Republican
Elected State Auditor
Keith Faber
Republican

Incumbent Republican state auditor Keith Faber easily won re-election.

=== Republican primary ===
==== Candidates ====
===== Declared =====
- Keith Faber, incumbent state auditor

==== Endorsements ====
Keith Faber

Organizations

- Ohio Republican Party

==== Results ====
Republican primary results
Party	Candidate	Votes	%
Republican	Keith Faber	809,636	100.00%
Total votes		809,636	100.00%

=== Democratic primary ===
==== Candidates ====
===== Declared =====
- Taylor Sappington, Nelsonville city auditor

==== Results ====
Democratic primary results
Party	Candidate	Votes	%
Democratic	Taylor Sappington	426,699	100.00%
Total votes		426,699	100.00%

=== General election ===
==== Results ====
Ohio State Treasurer election, 2022
Party	Candidate	Votes	%
Republican	Keith Faber (incumbent)	2,397,207	58.75%
Democratic	Taylor Sappington	1,683,216	41.25%
Total votes		4,080,423	100.00%
Republican hold			

== General Assembly ==
=== Senate ===
The 17 odd-numbered districts out of 33 seats in the Ohio Senate were up for election in 2022. Prior to the election, ten of these seats were held by Republicans and seven were held by Democrats.

=== House of Representatives ===
All 99 seats in the Ohio House of Representatives were up for election in 2022. Prior to the election, sixty-four of these seats were held by Republicans and thirty-five were held by Democrats.

== Supreme Court ==
2022 Ohio Supreme Court elections
- November 8, 2022

3 seats of the Supreme Court of Ohio
	Majority party	Minority party
Party	Republican	Democratic
Last election	4	3
Seats won	3	0
Seat change	Steady	Steady

Although Supreme Court elections were nonpartisan in the past, the Ohio General Assembly passed a bill in June 2021 to make Ohio Supreme Court and Ohio Court of Appeals elections display the party label on the candidates.

=== Chief Justice ===
==== Republican primary ====
===== Candidates =====
====== Declared ======
- Sharon L. Kennedy, incumbent Associate Justice of the Supreme Court of Ohio (2012–present)

====== Withdrew ======
- Pat DeWine, incumbent Associate Justice of the Supreme Court of Ohio (2017–present) (running for re-election)

====== Declined ======
- Maureen O'Connor, incumbent chief justice of the Supreme Court of Ohio (2011–present) (retiring due to age limit)

===== Endorsements =====
Sharon Kennedy

Organizations

- Ohio Republican Party

===== Results =====
Republican primary results
Party	Candidate	Votes	%
Republican	Sharon Kennedy	814,717	100.0%
Total votes		814,717	100.0%

==== Democratic primary ====
===== Candidates =====
====== Declared ======
- Jennifer Brunner, incumbent Associate Justice of the Supreme Court of Ohio (2021–present)

===== Endorsements =====
Jennifer Brunner

Labor unions

- LIUNA - Laborers' International Union of North America Local 758
- Ohio AFL–CIO

Organizations

- Ohio Democratic Party

===== Results =====
Democratic primary results
Party	Candidate	Votes	%
Democratic	Jennifer Brunner	445,711	100.0%
Total votes		445,711	100.0%

==== General election ====
2022 Ohio Chief Justice election
- November 8, 2022

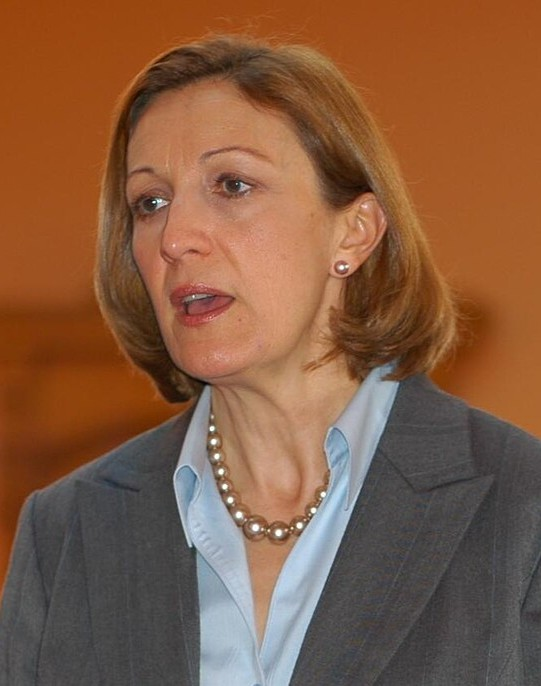
Nominee	Sharon Kennedy	Jennifer Brunner
Party	Republican	Democratic
Popular vote	2,307,415	1,807,133
Percentage	56.08%	43.92%
- Kennedy: 50–60% 60–70% 70–80% 80–90% Brunner: 50–60% 60–70% 70–80%
Chief Justice before election
Maureen O'Connor
Republican
Elected Chief Justice
Sharon Kennedy
Republican

===== Polling =====
Poll source	Date(s) administered	Sample size (Note: Key: A – all adults RV – registered voters LV – likely voters V – unclear)	Margin of error	Sharon Kennedy (R)	Jennifer Brunner (D)	Other	Undecided
Baldwin Wallace University	October 20–23, 2022	1,068 (LV)	± 3.5%	50%	43%	–	7%
Siena College	October 14–19, 2022	644 (LV)	± 5.1%	42%	41%	2% (Note: "Another candidate" with 1%; "Not going to vote" with 1%)	15%
Ohio Northern University/Lucid	October 11–15, 2022	668 (LV)	± 3.8%	49%	35%	1% (Note: "Other" with 1%)	16%
Siena College	September 18–22, 2022	642 (LV)	± 4.4%	40%	40%	1% (Note: "Not going to vote" with 1%)	18%
Suffolk University	September 5–7, 2022	500 (LV)	± 4.4%	42%	42%	<1% (Note: "Someone else" with <1%)	16%

===== Results =====
Ohio Chief Justice election, 2022
Party	Candidate	Votes	%
Republican	Sharon Kennedy	2,307,415	56.08%
Democratic	Jennifer Brunner	1,807,133	43.92%
Total votes		4,114,548	100.00%
Republican hold			

=== Associate Justice (term commencing 01/01/2023) ===
==== Republican primary ====
===== Candidates =====
====== Declared ======
- Patrick F. Fischer, incumbent Associate Justice of the Supreme Court of Ohio (2017–present)

===== Endorsements =====
Patrick Fischer

Organizations

- Ohio Republican Party

===== Results =====
Republican primary results
Party	Candidate	Votes	%
Republican	Patrick F. Fischer (incumbent)	788,538	100.0%
Total votes		788,538	100.0%

==== Democratic primary ====
===== Candidates =====
====== Declared ======
- Terri Jamison, incumbent Judge of the Ohio Court of Appeals for the 10th District (2021–present)

===== Endorsements =====
Terri Jamison

Organizations

- Ohio Democratic Party

===== Results =====
Democratic primary results
Party	Candidate	Votes	%
Democratic	Terri Jamison	418,525	100.0%
Total votes		418,525	100.0%

==== General election ====
===== Polling =====
Poll source	Date(s) administered	Sample size	Margin of error	Patrick Fischer (R)	Terri Jamison (D)	Other	Undecided
Baldwin Wallace University	October 20–23, 2022	1,068 (LV)	± 3.5%	51%	42%	–	7%
Suffolk University	September 5–7, 2022	500 (LV)	± 4.4%	42%	41%	<1% (Note: "Someone else" with <1%)	17%

===== Results =====
2022 Ohio Supreme Court seat 2 election
- November 8, 2022
Nominee	Patrick F. Fischer	Terri Jamison
Party	Republican	Democratic
Popular vote	2,330,575	1,764,845
Percentage	56.91%	43.09%
- Fischer: 50–60% 60–70% 70–80% 80–90% Jamison: 50–60% 60–70% 70–80%
Justice before election
Patrick F. Fischer
Republican
Elected Justice
Patrick F. Fischer
Republican

2022 Ohio Supreme Court Associate Justice (term commencing 1/01/2023) election
Party	Candidate	Votes	%
Republican	Patrick F. Fischer (incumbent)	2,330,575	56.91%
Democratic	Terri Jamison	1,764,845	43.09%
Total votes		4,095,420	100.0%
Republican hold			

=== Associate Justice (term commencing 01/02/2023) ===
==== Republican primary ====
===== Candidates =====
====== Declared ======
- Pat DeWine, incumbent Associate Justice of the Supreme Court of Ohio (2017–present)

===== Endorsements =====
Pat DeWine

Organizations

- Ohio Republican Party

===== Results =====
Republican primary results
Party	Candidate	Votes	%
Republican	Pat DeWine (incumbent)	719,162	100.0%
Total votes		719,162	100.0%

==== Democratic primary ====
===== Candidates =====
====== Declared ======
- Marilyn Zayas, incumbent Judge of the Ohio Court of Appeals for the 1st District

===== Endorsements =====
Marilyn Zayas

Organizations

- Ohio Democratic Party

===== Results =====
Democratic primary results
Party	Candidate	Votes	%
Democratic	Marilyn Zayas	406,732	100.0%
Total votes		406,732	100.0%

==== General election ====
===== Polling =====
Poll source	Date(s) administered	Sample size	Margin of error	Pat DeWine (R)	Marilyn Zayas (D)	Other	Undecided
Baldwin Wallace University	October 20–23, 2022	1,068 (LV)	± 3.5%	50%	43%	–	7%
Suffolk University	September 5–7, 2022	500 (LV)	± 4.4%	43%	41%	<1% (Note: "Someone else" with <1%)	15%

===== Results =====
2022 Ohio Supreme Court seat 3 election
- November 8, 2022

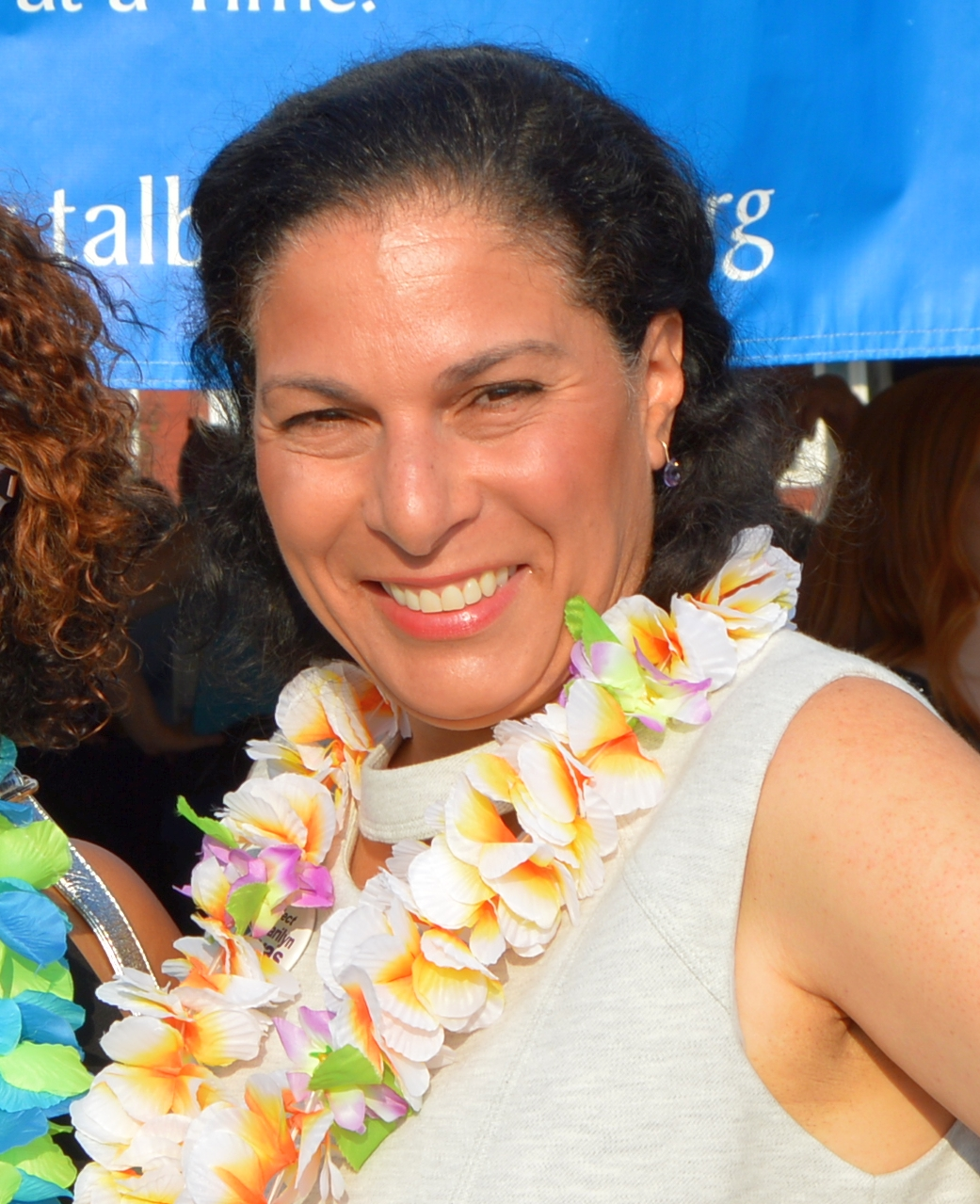
Nominee	Pat DeWine	Marilyn Zayas
Party	Republican	Democratic
Popular vote	2,306,428	1,789,384
Percentage	56.31%	43.69%
- DeWine: 50–60% 60–70% 70–80% 80–90% Zayas: 50–60% 60–70% 70–80%
Justice before election
Pat DeWine
Republican
Elected Justice
Pat DeWine
Republican

2022 Ohio Supreme Court Associate Justice (term commencing 1/02/2023) election
Party	Candidate	Votes	%
Republican	Pat DeWine (incumbent)	2,306,428	56.31%
Democratic	Marilyn Zayas	1,789,384	43.69%
Total votes		4,095,812	100.0%
Republican hold			

== Court of Appeals ==
The Ohio District Courts of Appeals consists of 69 judges in 12 districts. Judges serve a 6-year term. Approximately 1/3 of these positions were up for election in 2022.

=== District 1 ===
==== Term commencing 02/09/2023 ====
2022 Ohio Court of Appeals 1st District (Term commencing 02/09/2023) election
Party	Candidate	Votes	%
Democratic	Jennifer Kinsley	155,976	52.04%
Republican	Robert C. Winkler (incumbent)	143,730	47.96%
Total votes		299,706	100.0%
Democratic gain from Republican			

=== District 2 ===
==== Term commencing 02/09/2023 ====
2022 Ohio Court of Appeals 2nd District (Term commencing 02/09/2023) election
Party	Candidate	Votes	%
Republican	Mary Kate Huffman	262,552	100.0%
Total votes		262,552	100.0%
Republican hold			

==== Term commencing 02/10/2023 ====
2022 Ohio Court of Appeals 2nd District (Term commencing 02/10/2023) election
Party	Candidate	Votes	%
Republican	Ronald C. Lewis (incumbent)	256,094	100.0%
Total votes		256,094	100.0%
Republican hold			

==== Term commencing 02/11/2023 ====
2022 Ohio Court of Appeals 2nd District (Term commencing 02/11/2023) election
Party	Candidate	Votes	%
Republican	Michael Tucker (incumbent)	257,202	100.0%
Total votes		257,202	100.0%
Republican hold			

=== District 3 ===
==== Term commencing 02/09/2023 ====
2022 Ohio Court of Appeals 3rd District (Term commencing 02/09/2023) election
Party	Candidate	Votes	%
Republican	William R. Zimmerman (incumbent)	234,054	100.0%
Total votes		234,054	100.0%
Republican hold			

==== Term commencing 02/11/2023 ====
2022 Ohio Court of Appeals 3rd District (Term commencing 02/11/2023) election
Party	Candidate	Votes	%
Republican	Juergen A. Waldick	230,210	100.0%
Total votes		230,210	100.0%
Republican hold			

=== District 4 ===
==== Term commencing 02/09/2023 ====
2022 Ohio Court of Appeals 4th District (Term commencing 02/09/2023) election
Party	Candidate	Votes	%
Republican	Kristy Wilkin (incumbent)	150,335	100.0%
Total votes		150,335	100.0%
Republican hold			

=== District 5 ===
==== Term commencing 02/09/2023 ====
2022 Ohio Court of Appeals 5th District (Term commencing 02/09/2023) election
Party	Candidate	Votes	%
Republican	Andrew King	358,218	64.79%
Democratic	Earle E. Wise Jr. (incumbent)	194,678	35.21%
Total votes		552,896	100.0%
Republican gain from Democratic			

==== Term commencing 02/10/2023 ====
2022 Ohio Court of Appeals 5th District (Term commencing 02/10/2023) election
Party	Candidate	Votes	%
Republican	Craig Baldwin (incumbent)	368,698	66.79%
Democratic	David T. Ball	183,359	33.21%
Total votes		552,057	100.0%
Republican hold			

=== District 6 ===
==== Term commencing 02/09/2023 ====
2022 Ohio Court of Appeals 6th District (Term commencing 02/09/2023) election
Party	Candidate	Votes	%
Republican	Christine Mayle (incumbent)	206,616	100.0%
Total votes		206,616	100.0%
Republican hold			

==== Term commencing 02/10/2023 ====
2022 Ohio Court of Appeals 6th District (Term commencing 02/10/2023) election
Party	Candidate	Votes	%
Republican	Charles E. Sulek	152,365	52.34%
Democratic	Tom Puffenberger	138,738	47.66%
Total votes		291,103	100.0%
Republican gain from Democratic			

=== District 7 ===
==== Term commencing 02/09/2023 ====
2022 Ohio Court of Appeals 7th District (Term commencing 02/09/2023) election
Party	Candidate	Votes	%
Republican	Mark A. Hanni	110,739	58.60%
Democratic	Gene Donofrio (incumbent)	78,243	41.40%
Total votes		188,982	100.0%
Republican gain from Democratic			

=== District 8 ===
==== Term commencing 01/01/2023 ====
2022 Ohio Court of Appeals 8th District (Term commencing 01/01/2023) election
Party	Candidate	Votes	%
Democratic	Mary Eileen Kilbane (incumbent)	269,100	100.0%
Total votes		269,100	100.0%
Democratic hold			

==== Term commencing 01/02/2023 ====
2022 Ohio Court of Appeals 8th District (Term commencing 01/02/2023) election
Party	Candidate	Votes	%
Democratic	Lisa Forbes (incumbent)	264,878	100.0%
Total votes		264,878	100.0%
Democratic hold			

==== Term commencing 01/03/2023 ====
2022 Ohio Court of Appeals 8th District (Term commencing 01/03/2023) election
Party	Candidate	Votes	%
Democratic	Kathleen Ann Keough (incumbent)	250,596	100.0%
Total votes		250,596	100.0%
Democratic hold			

==== Term commencing 02/09/2023 ====
2022 Ohio Court of Appeals 8th District (Term commencing 02/09/2023) election
Party	Candidate	Votes	%
Democratic	Eileen A. Gallagher (incumbent)	251,158	100.0%
Total votes		251,158	100.0%
Democratic hold			

==== Unexpired term ending 02/09/2027 ====
2022 Ohio Court of Appeals 8th District (Unexpired term ending 02/09/2027) election
Party	Candidate	Votes	%
Democratic	Michael John Ryan	249,113	65.99%
Republican	Cornelius J. O'Sullivan (incumbent)	128,380	34.01%
Total votes		377,493	100.0%
Democratic gain from Republican			

=== District 9 ===
==== Term commencing 02/09/2023 ====
2022 Ohio Court of Appeals 9th District (Term commencing 02/09/2023) election
Party	Candidate	Votes	%
Republican	Scot Stevenson	211,909	50.66%
Democratic	Thomas A. Teodosio (incumbent)	206,400	49.34%
Total votes		418,309	100.0%
Republican gain from Democratic			

==== Term commencing 02/10/2023 ====
2022 Ohio Court of Appeals 9th District (Term commencing 02/10/2023) election
Party	Candidate	Votes	%
Republican	Donna J. Carr (incumbent)	225,815	54.38%
Democratic	Erica Voorhees	189,417	45.62%
Total votes		415,232	100.0%
Republican hold			

==== Term commencing 02/11/2023 ====
2022 Ohio Court of Appeals 9th District (Term commencing 02/11/2023) election
Party	Candidate	Votes	%
Republican	Jill Flagg Lanzinger	223,037	53.95%
Democratic	Amber Crowe	190,405	46.05%
Total votes		413,442	100.0%
Republican hold			

=== District 10 ===
==== Term commencing 01/01/2023 ====
2022 Ohio Court of Appeals 10th District (Term commencing 01/01/2023) election
Party	Candidate	Votes	%
Democratic	Kristin Boggs	262,128	62.97%
Republican	Laura Nesbitt	154,138	37.03%
Total votes		416,266	100.0%
Democratic gain from Republican			

==== Term commencing 01/02/2023 ====
2022 Ohio Court of Appeals 10th District (Term commencing 01/01/2023) election
Party	Candidate	Votes	%
Democratic	Julia L. Dorrian (incumbent)	306,332	100.0%
Total votes		306,332	100.0%
Democratic hold			

==== Term commencing 01/03/2023 ====
2022 Ohio Court of Appeals 10th District (Term commencing 01/01/2023) election
Party	Candidate	Votes	%
Democratic	Carly Edelstein	260,070	62.70%
Republican	Keith McGrath (incumbent)	154,725	37.30%
Total votes		414,795	100.0%
Democratic gain from Republican			

==== Term commencing 02/09/2023 ====
2022 Ohio Court of Appeals 10th District (Term commencing 01/01/2023) election
Party	Candidate	Votes	%
Democratic	David J. Leland	302,703	100.0%
Total votes		302,703	100.0%
Democratic gain from Republican			

=== District 11 ===
==== Term commencing 02/09/2023 ====
2022 Ohio Court of Appeals 11th District (Term commencing 02/09/2023) election
Party	Candidate	Votes	%
Republican	Eugene A. Lucci	172,345	58.52%
Democratic	Thomas R. Wright (incumbent)	122,164	41.48%
Total votes		294,509	100.0%
Republican gain from Democratic			

==== Unexpired term ending 02/08/2025 ====
2022 Ohio Court of Appeals 11th District (Unexpired term ending 02/08/2025) election
Party	Candidate	Votes	%
Republican	John J. Eklund (incumbent)	209,551	100.0%
Total votes		209,551	100.0%
Republican hold			

=== District 12 ===
==== Term commencing 02/09/2023 ====
2022 Ohio Court of Appeals 12th District (Term commencing 02/09/2023) election
Party	Candidate	Votes	%
Republican	Robin N. Piper (incumbent)	288,164	100.0%
Total votes		288,164	100.0%
Republican hold			

==== Term commencing 02/10/2023 ====
2022 Ohio Court of Appeals 12th District (Term commencing 02/10/2023) election
Party	Candidate	Votes	%
Republican	Michael E. Powell (incumbent)	287,711	100.0%
Total votes		287,711	100.0%
Republican hold			
