= 2024 Ohio elections =

- November 5, 2024

The 2024 Ohio general elections were held on November 5, 2024, throughout the US state of Ohio.

== Federal offices ==
=== Senate ===
Republican businessman Bernie Moreno defeated Democratic three-term incumbent Sherrod Brown. Brown secured only 46.5% of the vote, to Moreno's 50.1%. Primary elections took place on March 19, 2024. This was the first U.S. Senate race in Ohio where the incumbent was defeated since 2006, when Brown defeated Mike DeWine.

=== House of Representatives ===
All of Ohio's 15 seats in the United States House of Representatives were up for election in 2024. Prior to this election Republicans hold 10 seats and Democrats hold 5 seats.

== State offices ==
=== General Assembly ===
==== Senate ====
The 16 even-numbered districts out of 33 seats in the Ohio Senate were up for election in 2024. Fifteen of these seats are held by Republicans and one is held by Democrats. Prior to the election, Republicans hold 26 seats and Democrats hold 7 seats.

==== House of Representatives ====
All 99 seats in the Ohio House of Representatives were up for election in 2024. Prior to the election, Republicans hold 67 seats and Democrats hold 32 seats.

== Supreme Court ==
2024 Ohio Supreme Court elections
- November 5, 2024

3 seats of the Supreme Court of Ohio
	Majority party	Minority party
Party	Republican	Democratic
Seats before	4	3
Seats won	6	1
Seat change	▲2	▼2

=== Associate Justice (term commencing 01/01/2025) ===
==== Democratic primary ====
===== Candidates =====
- Michael P. Donnelly, incumbent Associate Justice of the Supreme Court of Ohio

===== Endorsements =====
Michael Donnelly

Organizations

- Ohio Democratic Party

===== Results =====
Democratic primary results
Party	Candidate	Votes	%
Democratic	Michael P. Donnelly (incumbent)	462,982	100.0%
Total votes		462,982	100.0%

==== Republican primary ====
===== Candidates =====
- Megan E. Shanahan, Hamilton County Common Pleas Judge

===== Endorsements =====
Megan Shanahan

Organizations

- Ohio Republican Party

===== Results =====
Republican primary results
Party	Candidate	Votes	%
Republican	Megan E. Shanahan	836,768	100.0%
Total votes		836,768	100.0%

==== General election ====
2024 Ohio Supreme Court election (Donnelly seat)
- November 5, 2024
Nominee	Megan E. Shanahan	Michael P. Donnelly
Party	Republican	Democratic
Popular vote	3,025,884	2,415,507
Percentage	55.61%	44.39%
- Shanahan: 50–60% 60–70% 70–80% 80–90% Donnelly: 50–60% 60–70% 70–80%
Justice before election
Michael P. Donnelly
Democratic
Elected Justice
Megan E. Shanahan
Republican

===== Polling =====
Poll source	Date(s) administered	Sample size (Note: Key: A – all adults RV – registered voters LV – likely voters V – unclear)	Margin of error	Michael Donnelly (D)	Megan Shanahan (R)	Undecided
ActiVote	October 2–25, 2024	400 (LV)	± 4.9%	45%	55%	–
ActiVote	August 9 – September 13, 2024	400 (LV)	± 4.9%	46%	54%	–

===== Results =====
General election results
Party	Candidate	Votes	%
Republican	Megan E. Shanahan	3,025,884	55.61%
Democratic	Michael P. Donnelly (incumbent)	2,415,507	44.39%
Total votes		5,441,391	100.0%
Republican gain from Democratic			

=== Associate Justice (term commencing 01/02/2025) ===
==== Democratic primary ====
===== Candidates =====
- Melody J. Stewart, incumbent Associate Justice of the Supreme Court of Ohio

===== Endorsements =====
Melody Stewart

Organizations

- Ohio Democratic Party

===== Results =====
Democratic primary results
Party	Candidate	Votes	%
Democratic	Melody J. Stewart (incumbent)	459,539	100.0%
Total votes		459,539	100.0%

==== Republican primary ====
===== Candidates =====
- Joe Deters, Associate Justice of the Supreme Court of Ohio

===== Endorsements =====
Joe Deters

Organizations

- Ohio Republican Party

===== Results =====
Republican primary results
Party	Candidate	Votes	%
Republican	Joe Deters	835,968	100.0%
Total votes		835,968	100.0%

==== General election ====
2024 Ohio Supreme Court election (Stewart seat)
- November 5, 2024
Nominee	Joe Deters	Melody J. Stewart
Party	Republican	Democratic
Popular vote	2,997,144	2,443,066
Percentage	55.09%	44.91%
- Deters: 50–60% 60–70% 70–80% 80–90% Stewart: 50–60% 60–70% 70–80%
Justice before election
Melody J. Stewart
Democratic
Elected Justice
Joe Deters
Republican

===== Polling =====
Poll source	Date(s) administered	Sample size	Margin of error	Melody Stewart (D)	Joe Deters (R)	Undecided
ActiVote	October 2–25, 2024	400 (LV)	± 4.9%	45%	55%	–
ActiVote	August 9 – September 13, 2024	400 (LV)	± 4.9%	48%	52%	–

===== Results =====
General election results
Party	Candidate	Votes	%
Republican	Joe Deters	2,997,144	55.09%
Democratic	Melody J. Stewart (incumbent)	2,443,066	44.91%
Total votes		5,440,210	100.0%
Republican gain from Democratic			

=== Associate Justice (unexpired term ending 12/31/2026) ===
==== Democratic primary ====
===== Candidates =====
====== Nominee ======
- Lisa Forbes, Eighth District Court of Appeals judge

====== Eliminated in primary ======
- Terri Jamison, Tenth District Court of Appeals judge

===== Endorsements =====
Lisa Forbes

Organizations

- Ohio Democratic Party

Newspapers

- The Plain Dealer (Democratic primary only)

===== Results =====
Democratic primary results
Party	Candidate	Votes	%
Democratic	Lisa Forbes	310,635	63.84%
Democratic	Terri Jamison	175,965	36.16%
Total votes		486,600	100.0%

==== Republican primary ====
===== Candidates =====
- Dan Hawkins, Franklin County Common Pleas Judge

===== Endorsements =====
Dan Hawkins

Organizations

- Ohio Republican Party

===== Results =====
Republican primary results
Party	Candidate	Votes	%
Republican	Dan Hawkins	810,411	100.0%
Total votes		810,411	100.0%

==== General election ====
2024 Ohio Supreme Court special election (Deter’s seat)
- November 5, 2024
Nominee	Dan Hawkins	Lisa Forbes
Party	Republican	Democratic
Popular vote	2,998,592	2,456,462
Percentage	54.97%	45.03%
- Hawkins: 50–60% 60–70% 70–80% 80–90% Forbes: 50–60% 60–70% 70–80%
Justice before election
Joe Deters
Republican
Elected Justice
Dan Hawkins
Republican

===== Polling =====
Poll source	Date(s) administered	Sample size	Margin of error	Dan Hawkins (R)	Lisa Forbes (D)	Undecided
ActiVote	October 2–25, 2024	400 (LV)	± 4.9%	54%	46%	–
ActiVote	August 9 – September 13, 2024	400 (LV)	± 4.9%	53%	47%	–

===== Results =====
General election results
Party	Candidate	Votes	%
Republican	Dan Hawkins	2,998,592	54.97%
Democratic	Lisa Forbes	2,456,462	45.03%
Total votes		5,455,054	100.0%
Republican hold			

== Court of Appeals ==
The Ohio District Courts of Appeals consists of 69 judges in 12 districts. Judges serve a 6-year term. Approximately 1/3 of these positions were up for election in 2024.

== Ballot initiatives ==
- 2024 Ohio Issue 1 on gerrymandering

== See also ==
- Elections in Ohio
- Political party strength in Ohio
