= 2026 Ohio Supreme Court election =

- November 3, 2026
	First party	Second party
Party	Republican	Democratic
Seats before	6	1
Seats after	5	2
Seat change	▼1	▲1

The 2026 Ohio Supreme Court election were held on November 3, 2026, to elect two justices to the Supreme Court of Ohio. Primary elections were held on May 5, 2026.

Democrats won both seats up for election, with district court judge Marilyn Zayas unseating incumbent justice Daniel R. Hawkins and incumbent justice Jennifer Brunner narrowly winning re-election.

== Jennifer Brunner's seat ==
2026 Ohio Supreme Court election (Brunner’s seat)
- November 3, 2026
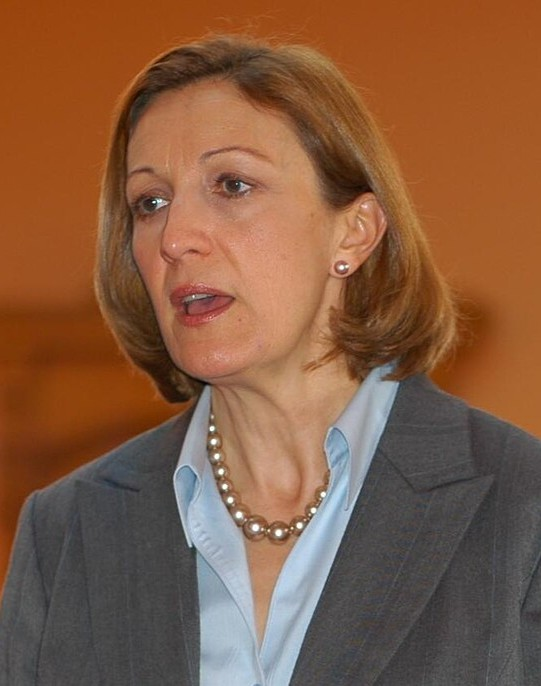

Candidate	Jennifer Brunner	Colleen O’Donnell
Party	Democratic	Republican
Popular vote	2,324,212	2,200,021
Percentage	51.37%	48.63%
- County results Brunner: 50–60% 60–70% 70–80% O'Donnell: 50–60% 60–70% 70–80% 80–90%
Justice before election
Jennifer Brunner
Democratic
Elected Justice
Jennifer Brunner
Democratic

=== Democratic primary ===
==== Candidates ====
===== Nominee =====
- Jennifer Brunner, incumbent justice

==== Results ====
Democratic primary
Party	Candidate	Votes	%
Democratic	Jennifer Brunner (incumbent)	687,294	100.00
Total votes		687,294	100.00

=== Republican primary ===
==== Candidates ====
===== Nominee =====
- Colleen O'Donnell, former judge of Franklin County Common Pleas Court

===== Eliminated in primary =====
- Andrew King, judge of the Fifth Ohio District Courts of Appeals (2023–present)
- Jill Flagg Lanzinger, judge of the Ninth Ohio District Courts of Appeals (2023–present)
- Ronald Lewis, judge of the Second Ohio District Courts of Appeals (2022–present)

==== Results ====
Primary results by county: O'Donnell: 20–30%; 30–40%; 40–50%; 50–60%; King: 20–30%; 30–40%; 40–50%; 50–60%; Lanzinger: 30–40%; 40–50%; 50–60%; Lewis: 20–30%

Republican primary
Party	Candidate	Votes	%
Republican	Colleen O'Donnell	237,040	32.14
Republican	Andrew King	219,277	29.73
Republican	Jill Flagg Lanzinger	147,771	20.04
Republican	Ronald Lewis	133,430	18.09
Total votes		737,518	100.00

=== General election ===
==== Results ====
2026 Ohio Supreme Court election, Jennifer Brunner's seat
Party	Candidate	Votes	%
Democratic	Jennifer Brunner (incumbent)	2,324,212	51.37
Republican	Colleen O'Donnell	2,200,021	48.63
Total votes		4,524,233	100.00
Democratic hold			

== Dan Hawkins' seat ==
2026 Ohio Supreme Court election (Hawkins's seat)
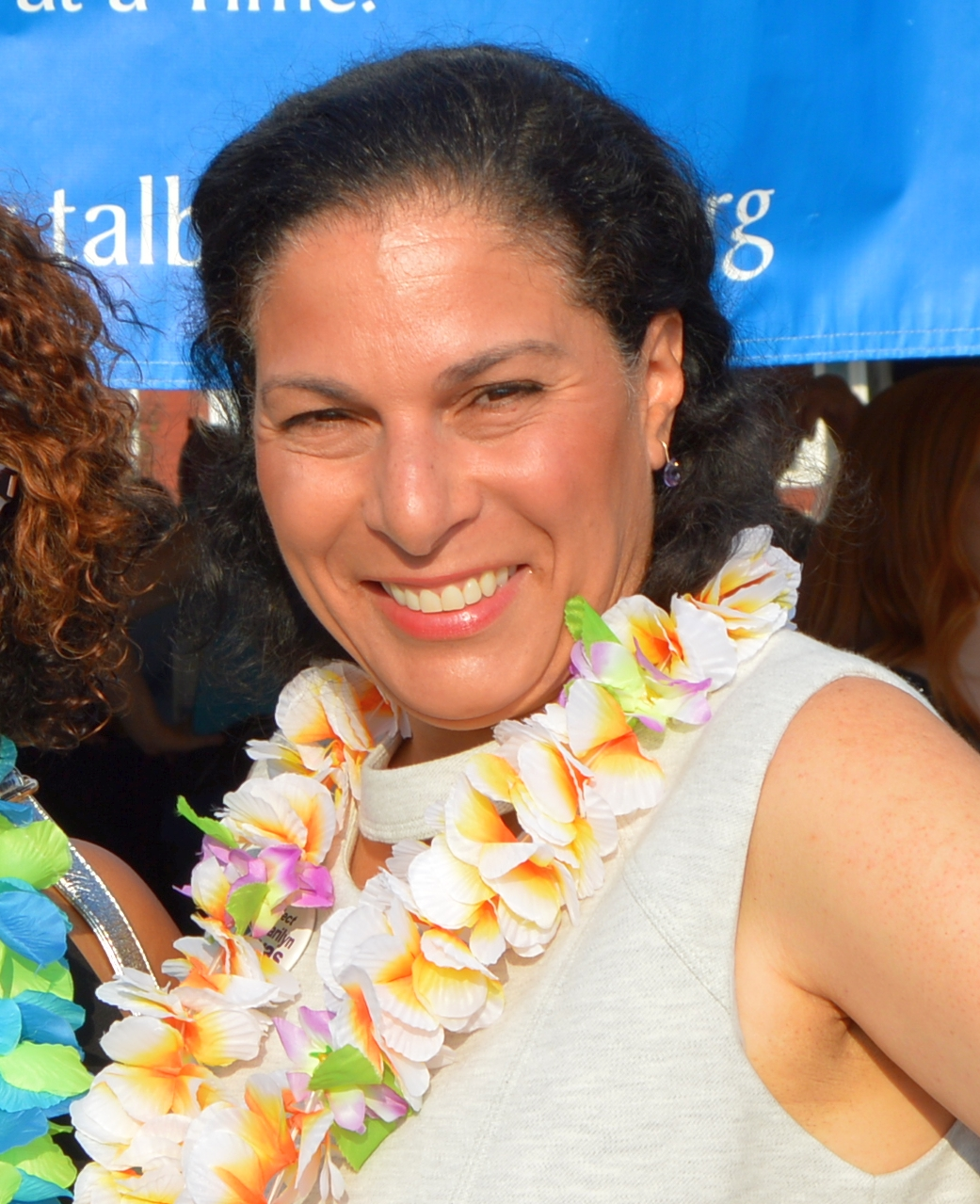

Candidate	Marilyn Zayas	Dan Hawkins
Party	Democratic	Republican
Popular vote	2,307,346	2,215,728
Percentage	51.01%	48.99%
- County results Zayas: 50–60% 60–70% 70–80% Hawkins: 50–60% 60–70% 70–80% 80–90%
Justice before election
Dan Hawkins
Republican
Elected Justice
Marilyn Zayas
Democratic

=== Republican primary ===
==== Candidates ====
===== Nominee =====
- Dan Hawkins, incumbent justice

==== Results ====
Republican primary
Party	Candidate	Votes	%
Republican	Dan Hawkins (incumbent)	674,078	100.00
Total votes		674,078	100.00

=== Democratic primary ===
==== Candidates ====
===== Nominee =====
- Marilyn Zayas, judge of the First Ohio District Courts of Appeals (2016–present)

==== Results ====
Democratic primary
Party	Candidate	Votes	%
Democratic	Marilyn Zayas	671,293	100.00
Total votes		671,293	100.00

=== General election ===
==== Results ====
2026 Ohio Supreme Court election, Dan Hawkins' seat
Party	Candidate	Votes	%
Democratic	Marilyn Zayas	2,307,346	51.01
Republican	Dan Hawkins (incumbent)	2,215,728	48.99
Total votes		4,523,074	100.00
Democratic gain from Republican			
