= 2006 Ohio State Treasurer election =

- November 7, 2006

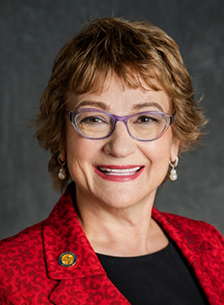
Nominee	Richard Cordray	Sandra O'Brien
Party	Democratic	Republican
Popular vote	2,223,282	1,618,625
Percentage	57.87%	42.13%
- County results Cordray: 50–60% 60–70% 70–80% O'Brien: 50–60% 60–70%
State Treasurer before election
Jennette Bradley
Republican
Elected State Treasurer
Richard Cordray
Democratic

The 2006 Ohio State Treasurer election was held on November 7, 2006. The Democratic nominee, Franklin County Treasurer Richard Cordray, defeated Republican challenger Ashtabula County Auditor Sandra O'Brien by a wide margin of 15 points. Cordray would not serve out a full term as treasurer, as he would go on to resign in 2009 in order to take office after winning the 2008 Ohio Attorney General special election held following Marc Dann's resignation.

As of 2025, this is the last time Democrats have won the office of Ohio State Treasurer.

== Background ==
Following Joe Deters' victory in the 2002 Ohio State Treasurer election, he went on to resign in 2004 after winning election to the office of Hamilton County Prosecutor. To fill the vacancy, Governor Bob Taft appointed Lieutenant Governor Jennette Bradley to the office.

== Republican primary ==
=== Candidates ===
- Jennette Bradley, incumbent State Treasurer
- Sandra O'Brien, Ashtabula County Auditor

=== Campaign ===
The Republican primary was held on May 2, 2006. The incumbent State Treasurer Jennette Bradley faced a primary challenge from Ashtabula County Auditor Sandra O'Brien. Bradley ran a lax campaign, with her advisors telling her to save her funds until the election. O'Brien attacked Bradley for her more left-leaning views, such as being pro-choice, and positioned herself as the more conservative candidate. In the end, O'Brien won an upset victory over Bradley, narrowly defeating her by three points.

=== Results ===
Republican primary results
Party	Candidate	Votes	%
Republican	Sandra O'Brien	341,531	51.68
Republican	Jennette Bradley (incumbent)	319,280	48.32
Total votes		660,811	100

== Democratic primary ==
=== Candidates ===
- Richard Cordray, Franklin County Treasurer

=== Campaign ===
The Democratic primary was held on May 2, 2006. Cordray was initially challenged for the Democratic nomination by Montgomery County Treasurer Hugh Quill, but Quill withdrew from the race before the primaries.

=== Results ===
Democratic primary results
Party	Candidate	Votes	%
Democratic	Richard Cordray	499,341	100
Total votes		499,341	100

== General election ==
=== Campaign ===
Cordray substantially outraised O'Brien, by the time of the October debate having raised over $1.5 million, while O'Brien trailed far behind at only $25,000.

=== Candidates ===
- Richard Cordray, Franklin County Treasurer (Democratic)
- Sandra O'Brien, Ashtabula County Auditor (Republican)

=== Debates ===
- Complete video of debate, October 18, 2006

=== Endorsements ===
Richard Cordray (D)

Newspapers

- The Blade
- Morning Journal

Individuals

- Former Senator John Glenn (1974-1999)
Sandra O'Brien (R)

Organizations

- Ohio Buckeyes Firearms Association

=== Results ===
The election was not close, with Cordray winning by 15 points, sweeping 51 of Ohio's 88 counties.

2006 Ohio State Treasurer election
Party	Candidate	Votes	%	±%
Democratic	Richard Cordray	2,223,282	57.87%	+11.19%
Republican	Sandra O'Brien	1,618,625	42.13%	−11.19%
Majority		604,657	15.74%	+9.1%
Turnout		3,841,907		
Democratic gain from Republican		Swing		
