= 1998 Ohio State Treasurer election =

- November 3, 1998

Nominee	Joe Deters	John A. Donofrio
Party	Republican	Democratic
Popular vote	1,719,143	1,472,940
Percentage	53.86%	46.14%
- County results Deters: 50–60% 60–70% 70–80% Donofrio: 50–60% 60–70%
State Treasurer before election
Ken Blackwell
Republican
Elected State Treasurer
Joe Deters
Republican

The 1998 Ohio State Treasurer election was held on November 3, 1998, to elect the Ohio State Treasurer. Primaries were held on May 3, 1998. Incumbent Republican Ohio State Treasurer Ken Blackwell chose not to run for re-election, instead running for Ohio Secretary of State. Republican Hamilton County Prosecuting Attorney Joe Deters won the election, defeating Democratic Summit County Treasurer John A. Donofrio by seven percentage points.

== Republican primary ==
=== Candidates ===
- Joe Deters, Hamilton County Prosecuting Attorney

=== Campaign ===
Deters won the Republican nomination unopposed.

=== Results ===
Republican primary results
Party	Candidate	Votes	%
Republican	Joe Deters	589,802	100%
Total votes		589,802	100.00%

== Democratic primary ==
=== Candidates ===
- John A. Donofrio, Summit County Treasurer
- Helen Knipe Smith, former Cleveland City Council member

=== Campaign ===
Donofrio won the nomination by a comfortable margin, defeating former Cleveland City Council member Helen Knipe Smith by eight percentage points.

=== Results ===
Democratic primary results
Party	Candidate	Votes	%
Democratic	John A. Donofrio	380,314	54.25%
Democratic	Helen Knipe Smith	320,775	45.75%
Total votes		701,089	100.00%

== General election ==
=== Candidates ===
- Joe Deters, Hamilton County Prosecuting Attorney (Republican)
- John A. Donofrio, Summit County Treasurer (Democratic)

=== Results ===
1998 Ohio State Treasurer election results
Party	Candidate	Votes	%	±%
Republican	Joe Deters	1,719,143	53.86%	−0.12%
Democratic	John A. Donofrio	1,472,940	46.14%	+3.82%
Total votes		3,192,083	100.00%	
Republican hold				
