= Yvette Brown =

Yvette Brown may refer to:

- Yvette Nicole Brown (born 1971), American actress, comedian and writer
- Yvette McGee Brown (born 1960), American judge
