= Megan E. Shanahan =

American judge (born 1972 or 1973)

Megan Shanahan

Justice of the Ohio Supreme Court
- Incumbent
- Assumed office January 1, 2025
- Preceded by: Michael Donnelly

Personal details
- Born: 1972 or 1973 (age 53–54) Pennsylvania
- Party: Republican
- Education: Kent State University (BA); University of Cincinnati (JD)

Megan Elizabeth Shanahan (born 1972 or 1973) is an American lawyer who has served as a justice of the Ohio Supreme Court since 2025. She served as a judge of the Hamilton County Court of Common Pleas from 2015 to 2024.

== Education ==
Shanahan received a Bachelor of Arts from Kent State University in 1995 and a Juris Doctor from the University of Cincinnati College of Law in 2000.

== Career ==
Shanahan started her legal career as an assistant prosecutor in Butler County, eventually rising to become Supervising Attorney of the office's Felony Division. During her time in the prosecutor's office she worked for County Prosecutor Joe Deters, who would eventually become her colleague on the Ohio Supreme Court.

=== Judicial service ===
In 2011 she was elected as a Hamilton County municipal court judge. Then in 2015, she was appointed by Ohio Governor John Kasich to a seat on the Hamilton County Common Pleas Court. She assumed office on April 13, 2015.

=== Ohio Supreme Court ===
In March 2023, Shanahan announced her run to become a justice of the Ohio Supreme Court; eventually becoming one of six candidates running for three seats on the Ohio Supreme Court. Shanahan was endorsed by the Ohio Republican Party. During the campaign Shanahan expressed her opposition to what she called "legislating from the bench." She also Shanahan was elected to the Ohio Supreme Court in the 2024 election held on November 5, 2024, unseating incumbent Associate Justice Michael P. Donnelly, a Democrat, by a 56% to 44% margin.

== Personal life ==
Shanahan is married and has two children. She is a member of St. Mary Hyde Park Catholic Church in Cincinnati. She is also a member of the Federalist Society.

Legal offices
Preceded by Michael Donnelly	Justice of the Ohio Supreme Court; 2025–present	Incumbent
