= 2006 Ohio Secretary of State election =

- November 7, 2006
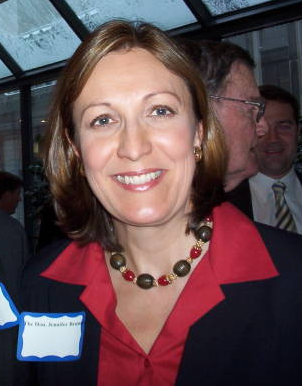

Nominee	Jennifer Brunner	Greg Hartmann
Party	Democratic	Republican
Popular vote	2,104,114	1,546,454
Percentage	55.03%	40.45%
- County results Brunner: 40-50% 50–60% 60–70% 70–80% Hartmann: 40-50% 50–60% 60–70%
Secretary of State before election
Ken Blackwell
Republican
Elected Secretary of State
Jennifer Brunner
Democratic

The 2006 Ohio Secretary of State election was held on November 7, 2006, to elect the Ohio Secretary of State, concurrently with elections to the United States Senate, U.S. House of Representatives, governor, and other state and local elections, as part of the 2006 midterm elections. Primary elections were held on May 2, 2006, though both major party candidates ran uncontested. A debate was hosted by the League of Women Voters and Ohio News Network on October 19, 2006.

Incumbent Republican secretary Ken Blackwell was term-limited and instead was the unsuccessful Republican nominee for governor. Democratic Franklin County Common Pleas judge Jennifer Brunner defeated Republican Hamilton County judge Greg Hartmann in the general election. Prior to the election, Hartmann was involved in a controversy regarding Social Security numbers being public and leaked in Hamilton County, which was brought up during a debate between him and Brunner. Brunner became the first woman to be elected as Ohio Secretary of State.

== Republican primary ==
=== Candidates ===
==== Nominee ====
- Greg Hartmann, Hamilton County judge and clerk

==== Withdrawn ====
- Jim Trakas, state representative from the 17th district (1999-present)

=== Results ===
Republican primary results
Party	Candidate	Votes	%
Republican	Greg Hartmann	444,076	100.0%
Total votes		444,076	100.0%

== Democratic primary ==
=== Candidates ===
==== Nominee ====
- Jennifer Brunner, Franklin County Common Pleas judge and former member of the Franklin County Board of Elections

=== Results ===
Democratic primary results
Party	Candidate	Votes	%
Democratic	Jennifer Brunner	599,785	100.0%
Total votes		599,785	100.0%

== General election ==
=== Endorsements ===
Jennifer Brunner (D)

Newspapers and other media

- The Toledo Blade

Organizations

- Columbus Education Association

=== Results ===
Ohio Secretary of State election, 2006
Party	Candidate	Votes	%
Democratic	Jennifer Brunner	2,104,114	55.03%
Republican	Greg Hartmann	1,546,454	40.45%
Independent	John Eastman	94,706	2.48%
Independent	Timothy Kettler	78,080	2.04%
Total votes		3,823,354	100.0%
Democratic gain from Republican			
