= Ohio's 32nd senatorial district =

American legislative district

Ohio's 32nd State Senate district
Senator
Sandra O'Brien; R–Lenox Township
- Demographics: 86.5% White; 7.2% Black; 2.6% Hispanic; 0.9% Asian; 2% Native American; 0.1% Hawaiian/Pacific Islander
- Population (2020) • Voting age • Citizens of voting age: 371,509; 293,791; 288,310

After the 2023 redistricting, Ohio's 32nd senatorial district continued to be made up of the counties of Ashtabula and Trumbull as well as portions of Geauga county. The house districts numbers have changed and the new house districts are 64, 65 and 99.

The current Ohio Senator is Republican Sandra O'Brien.

== Historically ==
The district has been based in the Mahoning Valley. Before the 2023 redistricting it consisted of the counties of Ashtabula and Trumbull as well as portions of Geauga county. It encompasses Ohio House districts 63, 64 and 99. It has a Cook PVI of R+10.

== List of senators ==
Senator	Party	Term	Notes
Bishop Kilpatrick	Democrat	January 3, 1967 – December 31, 1972	Kilpatrick lost the party nomination in 1972 to Tom Carney.
Tom Carney	Democrat	January 3, 1973 – December 31, 1988	Carney lost re-election in 1988 to Chip Henry.
Chip Henry	Republican	January 3, 1989 – December 31, 1992	Henry lost re-election in 1992 to Anthony Latell.
Anthony Latell Jr.	Democrat	January 3, 1993 – December 31, 2000	Latell was term-limited in 2000.
Tim Ryan	Democrat	January 3, 2001 – December 19, 2002	Ryan resigned following election to the United States House of Representatives.
Marc Dann	Democrat	January 6, 2003 – December 31, 2006	Dann resigned following election as Ohio Attorney General.
Capri Cafaro	Democrat	January 2, 2007 – December 31, 2016	Cafaro was term-limited in 2016.
Sean O'Brien	Democrat	January 3, 2017 – January 4, 2021	Sean O'Brien lost re-election in 2020 to Sandra O'Brien.
Sandra O'Brien	Republican	January 4, 2021 – present	Incumbent
