= Michael P. Donnelly (judge) =

American judge (born 1966)

Michael Donnelly

Justice of the Ohio Supreme Court
- In office January 1, 2019 – December 31, 2024
- Preceded by: Terrence O'Donnell
- Succeeded by: Megan E. Shanahan

Personal details
- Born: Michael Patrick Donnelly; August 30, 1966 (age 60) Cleveland, Ohio, U.S.
- Party: Democratic
- Education: John Carroll University (BA); Cleveland State University (JD)

Michael Patrick Donnelly (born August 30, 1966) is an American lawyer who served as a justice of the Supreme Court of Ohio from 2019 to 2024. He formerly served as a judge of the Cuyahoga County Court of Common Pleas from 2005 to 2019. In 2024, Donnelly lost re-election to his seat to Hamilton County Court of Common Pleas judge Megan E. Shanahan.

== Education ==
Donnelly was born August 30, 1966. He received his Bachelor of Arts from John Carroll University and his Juris Doctor from the Cleveland–Marshall College of Law.

== Career ==
Before serving on the Court of Common Pleas, Donnelly was an assistant Cuyahoga County Prosecutor from 1992 to 1997. He then went on to practice civil ligation, where he represented plaintiffs and injured workers in asbestos litigation, personal injury lawsuits, and workers’ compensation claims. He served in the offices of Davis & Young from 1997 to 1999 and then Climaco, Lefkowitz, Peca, Wilcox & Garofoli from 1999 to 2004.

=== Judicial service ===
He previously served as a judge on the Cuyahoga County Court of Common Pleas General Division in Cleveland, Ohio. He first joined the court on January 3, 2005. From 2010 to 2017, he was one of five judges on Cuyahoga County’s Mental Health and Developmental Disabilities Court, which oversees criminal cases involving defendants who suffer from schizophrenia, schizophrenic disorder, or a developmental disability. He also has been a faculty member of the Ohio Judicial College, teaching both attorneys and judges at numerous continuing-legal-education seminars on professionalism and issues of civil and criminal justice reform.

=== Ohio Supreme Court ===
On January 3, 2018, Donnelly announced his candidacy as a justice of the Ohio Supreme Court, seeking to replace Terrence O'Donnell, who reached the mandatory retirement age. On November 6, 2018, Donnelly defeated his Republican opponent Judge Craig Baldwin who sits on the Fifth District Court of Appeals in Canton, Ohio 61 percent to 39 percent.

During his tenure, Donnelly has written several notable dissents, including in a case involving the state takeover of Youngstown City Schools. In that case, the majority upheld the constitutionality of Ohio House Bill 70, which allowed for the state of Ohio to take over lower performing public schools. Donnelly disagreed with the majority opinion, and called the decision an “egregious display of constitutional grade inflation," siding firmly against the decision.

== Personal life ==
Donnelly resides in Cleveland Heights, Ohio with his wife Nancy and two children.

Legal offices
Preceded by Terrence O'Donnell	Justice of the Ohio Supreme Court; 2019–2024	Succeeded by Megan E. Shanahan
