= Thomas J. Moyer =

American judge

Thomas Joseph Moyer
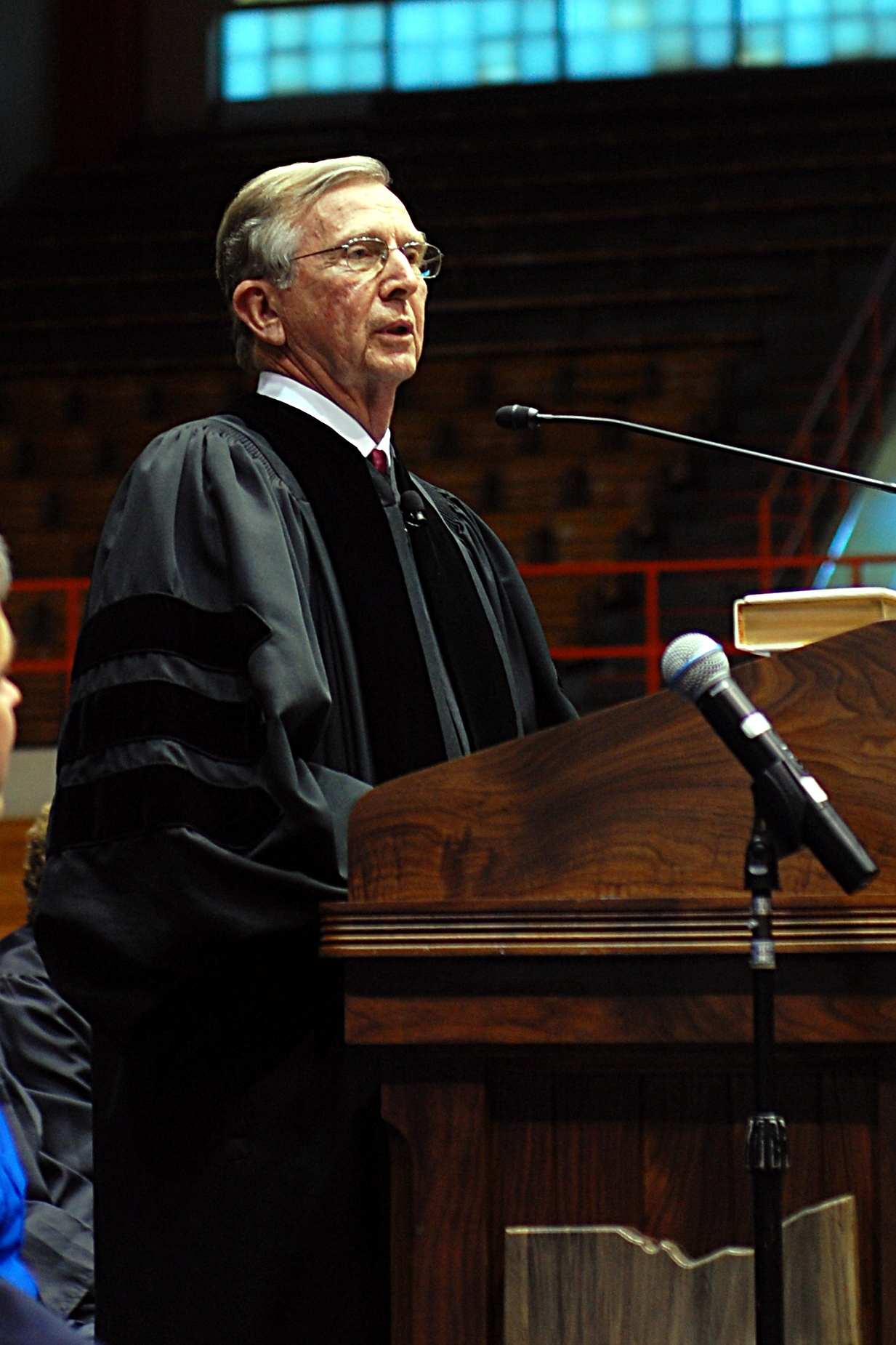
- Moyer in 2008

Chief Justice of the Ohio Supreme Court
- In office January 1, 1987 – April 2, 2010
- Preceded by: Frank Celebrezze
- Succeeded by: Eric Brown

Personal details
- Born: April 18, 1939 Sandusky, Ohio, U.S.
- Died: April 2, 2010 (aged 70) Columbus, Ohio, U.S.
- Resting place: Green Lawn Cemetery, Columbus, Ohio
- Party: Republican
- Spouse: Mary Francis Moyer
- Children: 5
- Education: Ohio State University (BA, JD)

Thomas Joseph Moyer (April 18, 1939 – April 2, 2010) was an American jurist and the chief justice of the Ohio Supreme Court from 1987 to 2010. A member of the Republican Party, he formerly served as a justice of the 10th district of the Ohio District Courts of Appeals from 1979 to 1987. The Thomas J. Moyer Ohio Judicial Center, headquarters of the Ohio Supreme Court, was named in his honor in 2011.

== Early life ==
Moyer was born in Sandusky, Ohio, on April 18, 1939. He attended Sandusky High School and went on to receive both his undergraduate and law degrees from the Ohio State University. He served as chairman of the board of directors of the Ohio State Alumni Association, as well as the board of trustees of Franklin University. Moyer was married and lived in Columbus.

== Career ==
From 1979 to 1987, Moyer served on the Tenth District Court of Appeals for Ohio, which covers Franklin County. Prior to his appointment, he served as the president of the Columbus Board of Education. During his tenure there, the board found itself in the middle of desegregation fights, chronicled in the book Getting Around Brown. He also served for four years as an executive assistant to Governor Jim Rhodes and eight years in private practice in Sandusky. He was first elected to the Ohio Supreme Court in 1987 and was re-elected in 1992, 1998, and 2004.

Moyer presided over the DeRolph decision dealing with school funding, as well as the late 1990s' legal battle over tort reform.

Although a Republican, Moyer had a strong belief in the principles of stare decisis. In 2001, he created a task force on guardians ad litem in Ohio. In 2004, when the court moved into new quarters, some controversy ensued over the cost involved. On May 15, 2004, the building was dedicated by U.S. Chief Justice William Rehnquist. He died of heart disease on April 2 2010 at age 70

Political offices
Preceded by Frank Celebrezze	Chief Justice of the Ohio Supreme Court; 1987–2010	Succeeded by Eric Brown
