= Yvette McGee Brown =

American judge (born 1960)

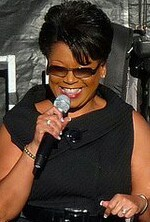

Associate Justice of the Ohio Supreme Court
- In office January 1, 2011 – December 7, 2012
- Appointed by: Ted Strickland
- Preceded by: Maureen O'Connor
- Succeeded by: Sharon L. Kennedy

Judge of the Court of Common Pleas of Franklin County, Ohio
- In office 1993–2002

Personal details
- Born: 1960 (age 65–66) Columbus, Ohio, U.S.
- Party: Democratic
- Spouse: Tony Brown
- Education: Ohio University (BA); Ohio State University (JD)
- Profession: Lawyer, social worker, politician

Yvette McGee Brown (born 1960) is a judge who became the first African American female justice on the Ohio Supreme Court when she took office on January 1, 2011. She was the founding president of the Center for Child and Family Advocacy at Nationwide Children's Hospital, and was a judge of the Franklin County Court of Common Pleas for nine years.

Brown was inducted into the Ohio Women's Hall of Fame in 2008 and the Central Ohio Business Hall of Fame in 2014. She is noted for a number of community service awards, public service, and her dedication to child and family protection. She currently serves as Partner-In-Charge of Diversity, Inclusion & Advancement at the global law firm of Jones Day.

== Education ==
Brown received her undergraduate degree in Journalism and Public Relations from Ohio University; her Juris Doctor from Ohio State University, Moritz College of Law; an honorary Doctor of Laws Degree from Ohio Dominican University; and honorary Doctorates from Wilberforce University and Central State University.

== Career ==
In 1992, Brown was elected to the Franklin County Court of Common Pleas, Domestic Relations and Juvenile division. She was the first African-American woman to be elected to this court, where she served for nine years. As lead Juvenile Court Judge, she led the creation of the Family Drug Court and the SMART Program, a truancy and educational neglect intervention program.

Brown was the founding President of the non-profit Center for Child and Family Advocacy at Nationwide Children's Hospital, an organization dedicated to the treatment and prevention of child abuse and domestic violence, since 2002. She has served on the boards of Ohio University, The Ohio State University Medical Center, the Columbus Academy, the Community Shelter Board, M/I Homes, Inc. and Fifth Third Bank of Central Ohio.

On December 10, 2010, Governor Ted Strickland appointed Brown to The Ohio Supreme Court effective January 1, 2011, to fill the remainder of the term of Associate Justice Maureen O'Connor, who was elected chief justice November 2. She was defeated in her bid for re-election by Sharon L. Kennedy. Her term ended on December 7, 2012.

Brown joined the Business and Tort Litigation practice of Jones Day in 2013 in its Columbus office. In February 2015, she became the firmwide Partner-in-Charge of Diversity, Inclusion & Advancement.

=== Politics ===
Brown is a member of the Democratic Party.

Judge Brown served in the Franklin County Court of Common Pleas, Division of Domestic Relations and Juvenile Court. She was the first American of African Ancestry and the second woman to be elected to this court. First elected in 1993, she retired in 2002 to develop the Center for Child and Family Advocacy.

==== 2010 elections ====
On January 19, 2010, Governor Ted Strickland announced that he had chosen Yvette McGee Brown as his running mate for his second term, replacing Lieutenant Governor Lee Fisher, who was departing the post to run for the U.S. Senate seat being vacated by Republican George Voinovich.

Brown would have become the fourth female lieutenant governor and the second American of African Ancestry lieutenant governor in Ohio history. The Strickland/Brown ticket lost to John Kasich and his running mate Mary Taylor on November 2, 2010.

=== Awards ===
Brown was inducted into the Ohio Women's Hall of Fame in 2008. In 2014, she was inducted into the Central Ohio Business Hall of Fame. She has been honored for her community service with many awards. Most notably, she has won the Public Service Award from Ohio University; The Medal of Merit Alumni Award from Ohio University; the Distinguished Service Award from The Ohio State University; the William Oxley Thompson Alumni Award for Distinguished Achievement Award from The Ohio State University Alumni Association; the Champion of Children Award; and the YWCA Woman of Achievement Award.

== Personal life ==
Yvette McGee Brown was born in urban Columbus to a single teenage mother. Yvette was raised by her mother and a grandmother, and the importance of education was stressed to her as she grew up. She was a first-generation college graduate. She is a Baptist.

She is married to Anthony Brown, retired special-education teacher. They have three children, and two grandchildren. During Brown's campaign for lieutenant governor of Ohio, she referred to her grandmother, who advised her to "Go run, tell that!", when others were talking about her. She told voters to "go run" and "tell" others about the facts of the Strickland-Brown 2010 governor-lieutenant governor campaign.

== See also ==
- List of African-American jurists

Non-profit organization positions
New title	President of the Center for Child and Family Advocacy; 2002–2010	Succeeded by Karen Days
Party political offices
Preceded by Lee Fisher	Democratic nominee for Lieutenant Governor of Ohio; 2010	Succeeded by Sharen Neuhardt
Legal offices
Preceded by Maureen O'Connor	Associate Justice of the Ohio Supreme Court; 2011–2012	Succeeded by Sharon L. Kennedy
