= Eric Brown (judge) =

American judge

Hon. Eric S. Brown
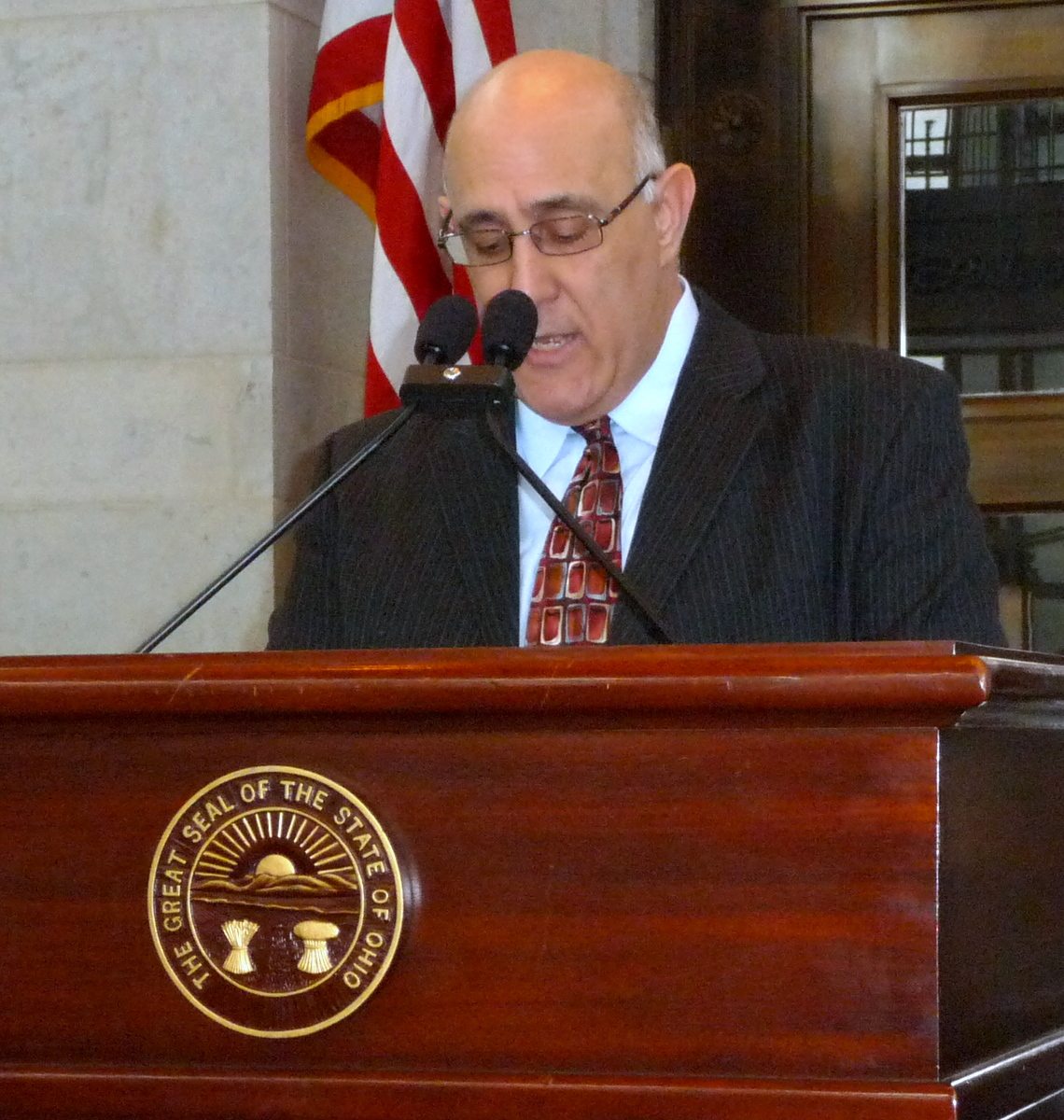
- Brown in 2010

Chief Justice of the Ohio Supreme Court
- In office May 3, 2010 – December 31, 2010
- Appointed by: Ted Strickland
- Preceded by: Thomas Moyer
- Succeeded by: Maureen O'Connor

Personal details
- Born: August 21, 1953 (age 73) Cleveland, Ohio, U.S.
- Party: Democratic
- Children: Beryl Piccolantonio
- Education: Cleveland State University; Cleveland State University College of Law

Eric S. Brown (born August 21, 1953) is the former chief justice of the Ohio Supreme Court. He was appointed by Governor Ted Strickland on May 3, 2010, following the death of Chief Justice Thomas Moyer on April 2, 2010. Brown was the first Jewish Chief Justice in Ohio history.

He received a bachelor's degree in history from Cleveland State University in 1975 and a law degree from the Cleveland State University College of Law in 1979. He has served as an Assistant Attorney General, Judge and Magistrate on the Franklin County Court of Common Pleas, Judge for Franklin County's Probate Court, and Judge on the Franklin County Municipal Court. Since 2015, Brown has served as a member of the Columbus City Schools Board of Education.

Brown was defeated for Chief Justice by Associate Justice Maureen O'Connor, the Republican candidate, in the November 2, 2010 general election.

== Early career ==
Brown started his legal career engaged in a private law practice in his hometown of Cleveland, handling a wide variety of legal matters in both a small firm and solo practice. He handled civil and criminal litigation, business, real estate, and probate law matters. Brown was one of the first lawyers in Ohio to develop a law practice serving the needs of the elderly and their families.

He served for nearly 15 years as an elected public school board member for Mayfield City Schools. For a decade, he served the bar association as treasurer, chair of the budget & management committee, and as an elected trustee. Brown owned and operated several businesses, and was honored by his local chamber of commerce as Business Person of the Year.

== Judicial career ==
Prior to his appointment as Chief Justice, Brown served as the Judge for Franklin County's Probate Court where he presided over the largest single-judge court in Ohio, serving as both judge and clerk of the court, overseeing a staff of 50 employees, including seven magistrates.

Before serving as Probate Court Judge, Brown served as a Judge and Magistrate on the Franklin County Court of Common Pleas, General Division where he presided over a large caseload consisting of criminal felony cases, substantial civil disputes, administrative appeals, and a wide variety of other matters, including serving as the probate judge in a significant guardianship case. As a common pleas court judge, he handled more than 7,300 cases on his docket, nearly 4,400 of those civil and more than 3,000 of those criminal cases. After his defeat by O'Connor, Governor Strickland appointed Brown to an open judgeship on the Franklin County Municipal Court.

Brown also served 11 years as an Assistant Attorney General for Ohio Attorneys General Lee Fisher and Betty Montgomery, where he worked as both a lawyer and as a manager. As Assistant and Acting Chief of the Consumer Protection Section, he successfully managed a staff of 70, including lawyers, investigators, consumer specialists, and support staff. As Tobacco Litigation Counsel, he helped lead the largest litigation in Ohio history, coordinating the work of six law firms serving as outside counsel, supervising a core team of eight staff attorneys, and coordinating Ohio's efforts with more than 40 other states.

== Education ==
Brown received a bachelor's degree in history from Cleveland State University in 1975 and a law degree from the Cleveland State University College of Law in 1979. In June 2009, Brown was named an ASTAR Fellow after completing the two-year Advanced Science and Technology Adjudication Resource program, which is designed to prepare judges to preside over cases involving complex science and technology issues and to serve as a resource to other judges. Brown's service on judicial related organizations also includes: his appointment to the Ohio Judicial Conference Probate Law & Procedure Committee, his appointment to the Supreme Court Commission on the Rules of Practice & Procedure, and his appointment to the Franklin County Criminal Justice Planning Board, which provides oversight for criminal and juvenile justice programs funded through Franklin County.

== Family ==
Brown and his wife, Marilyn Brown, a former member of the Franklin County Board of Commissioners, have been married since 1973 and have two daughters and three grandsons. They are members of Congregation Tifereth Israel. One of their daughters, Beryl Piccolantonio, formerly served as the President of the Gahanna-Jefferson School Board, and is now Ohio's 4th house district's state representative.

Legal offices
Preceded by Thomas Moyer	Chief Justice of the Ohio Supreme Court; 2010	Succeeded by Maureen O'Connor
