= Pat DeWine =

American jurist

Justice of the Ohio Supreme Court
- Incumbent
- Assumed office January 2, 2017
- Preceded by: Paul Pfeifer

Personal details
- Born: Richard Patrick DeWine
- Party: Republican
- Children: 3
- Parent: Mike DeWine (father)
- Relatives: Kevin DeWine (second cousin once removed)
- Education: Miami University (BA); University of Michigan (JD)

Richard Patrick DeWine is an American jurist who has served as a justice of the Ohio Supreme Court since 2017. He served as a justice of the 1st district of the Ohio District Courts of Appeals from 2013 to 2017 and as a politician in Hamilton County, Ohio. He is the son of Ohio Governor Mike DeWine.

== Early life and education ==
DeWine is the eldest of eight children born to Mike DeWine and Frances (née Struewing), and grew up in the Mount Lookout neighborhood of Cincinnati. After earning a Bachelor of Arts degree from Miami University, he graduated cum laude from the University of Michigan Law School in 1994 and was inducted into the Order of the Coif.

== Career ==
DeWine served as a member of the Cincinnati City Council and the Hamilton County Board of Commissioners. He was first elected to city council in 1999, and was re-elected in 2001 and in 2003. He resigned from city council in order to take his seat on the Hamilton County Commission.

DeWine was an unsuccessful candidate in the 2005 Republican primary for Ohio's 2nd congressional district special election after Rob Portman resigned to become U.S. Trade Representative. His campaign for Congress suffered after allegations of infidelity surfaced against him.

=== State judicial career ===
DeWine sought and won election to the Hamilton County Court of Common Pleas in 2008, defeating Norma Holt Davis in the general election. He subsequently won a seat on the 1st District Ohio District Courts of Appeals in 2012, defeating Bruce Whitman.

DeWine took his seat on the Appellate bench in January 2013. He won an uncontested Republican primary election in March 2016 for a seat on the Ohio Supreme Court, and defeated his Democratic opponent for the seat in November of that year. He was reelected to the Ohio Supreme Court in November 2022 for a second six-year term. Prior to his election as a justice, he was an associate for 13 years with the firm of Keating Muething & Klekamp.

In August 2021, DeWine withdrew from the contest to be nominated as Ohio Supreme Court chief justice in succession to Chief Justice Maureen O'Connor.

==== Involvement in legislative redistricting cases ====
DeWine refused to recuse from a case in which his father, Governor Mike DeWine, was a party, and helped author the minority opinion that would have upheld an unconstitutional gerrymander approved by the Ohio Redistricting Commission, on which Governor DeWine sat.

== Personal life ==
DeWine's first marriage ended in divorce in 2003. He and his first wife have three sons. He was married to his second wife, Rhonda, from 2010 until 2019 when she filed for divorce.

Legal offices
Preceded by Paul Pfeifer	Justice of the Ohio Supreme Court; 2017–present	Incumbent
