= Jennette Bradley =

American politician (born 1952)

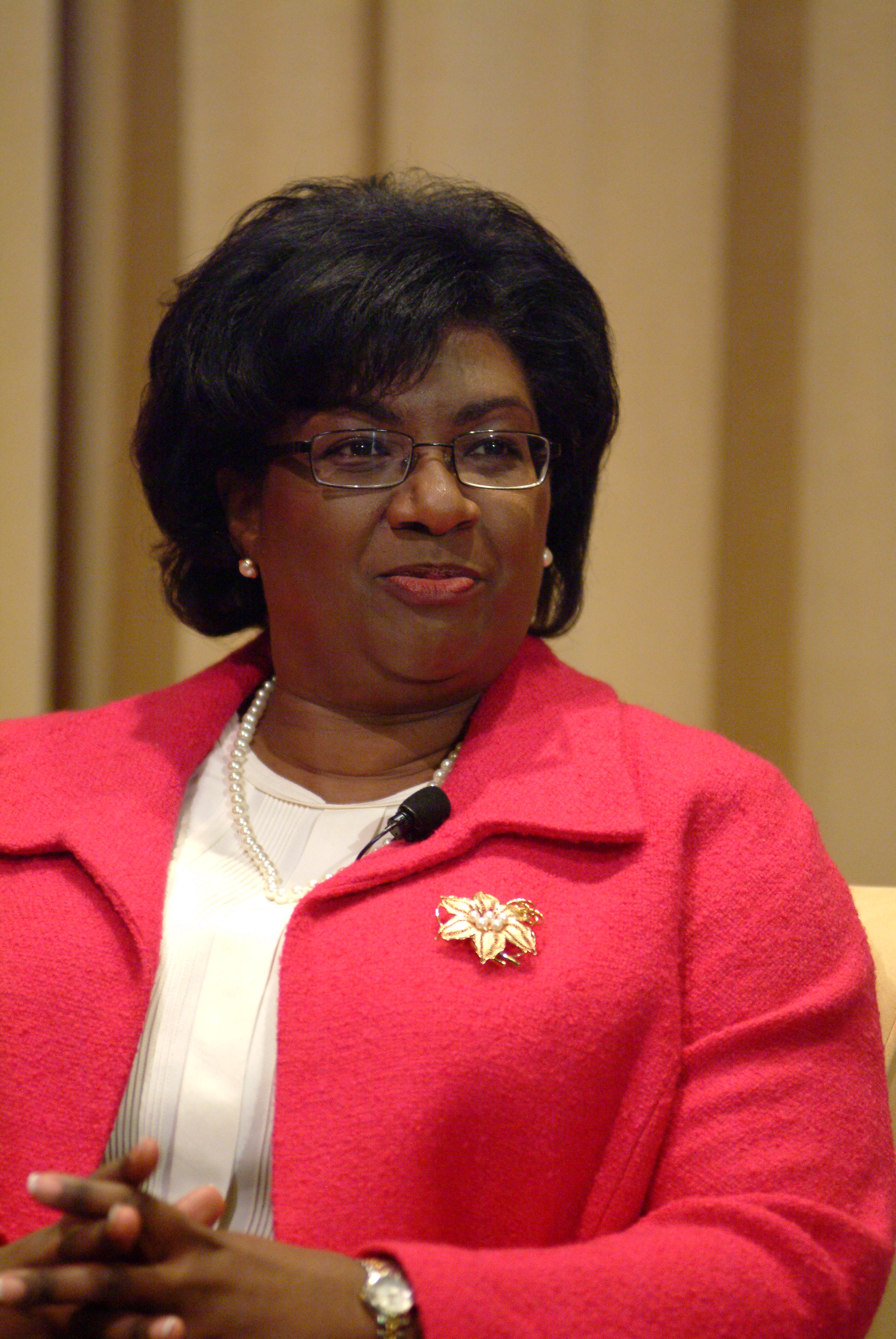
- Bradley in 2009

62nd Lieutenant Governor of Ohio
- In office January 13, 2003 – January 5, 2005
- Governor: Bob Taft
- Preceded by: Maureen O'Connor
- Succeeded by: Bruce E. Johnson

45th Treasurer of Ohio
- In office January 5, 2005 – January 8, 2007
- Governor: Bob Taft
- Preceded by: Joe Deters
- Succeeded by: Richard Cordray

Columbus City Council
- In office 1991–2002

Personal details
- Born: October 2, 1952 (age 74) Columbus, Ohio, U.S.
- Party: Republican
- Spouse: Michael C. Taylor (m. 1990)
- Education: Wittenberg University
- Profession: Politician

Jennette B. Bradley (born October 2, 1952) is an American politician who served as the 62nd lieutenant governor of Ohio from 2003 to 2005 and as the treasurer of Ohio from 2005 to 2007. A member of the Republican Party, she was the first African American woman elected to statewide office in Ohio.

== Early life and education ==
Bradley was born in Columbus, Ohio. Her family settled in a neighborhood on Columbus' east side after her father retired from the United States Army. After graduating from East High School in 1970, Bradley attended Wittenberg University in Springfield, Ohio and earned a degree in psychology.

== Career ==
Bradley took a job with the Columbus Metropolitan Housing Authority. She became the first black woman to serve as the executive director of the Authority when she was 28 years old. She also worked on the Wittenberg Board of Trustees. In 1986, Bradley moved to Washington, D.C. She returned to Columbus in 1989 and worked as a senior executive for Huntington National Bank.

Bradley entered the 1991 Columbus City Council race as a Republican candidate. She was reelected in 1995 and 1999. During her tenure she was chair of City Council's Recreation and Parks and Public Utilities committees. She resigned from the council when she became Lieutenant Governor in 2003.

In 2002, Governor Bob Taft announced he had chosen Bradley to replace Maureen O'Connor as his running mate. Many conservatives did not support Bradley because she was pro-choice. Critics of the Taft-Bradley ticket were also concerned about her City Council vote to extend city workers' health care benefits to include domestic partners and same-sex couples. Bradley was then criticized for having later voted against this legislation.

Taft and Bradley won the race with approximately 58% of the vote. Bradley became the third female lieutenant governor of Ohio and the first African-American woman elected to the office. She also became the first black female lieutenant governor of any U.S. state.

After taking office, Bradley was appointed by Taft to head the Ohio Department of Commerce, the Clean Ohio Council, and the Ohio Housing Finance Agency. In 2004, the governor also appointed Bradley to the "Jobs Cabinet." Following the resignation of Joseph T. Deters as state treasurer, Taft appointed Bradley to the post, effective January 2005. She resigned as lieutenant governor before taking her new post However, Bradley was defeated by conservative Tea Party-backed Ashtabula County Auditor Sandra O'Brien in the May 2006 Republican primary election. She returned to private life in 2007 and has occasionally consulted for the Columbus City Council.

In 2016, Bradley was among the 9 people chosen from over 100 candidates to serve on a committee to review the charter of the Columbus City Council.

== See also ==
- List of female lieutenant governors in the United States
- List of minority governors and lieutenant governors in the United States

Party political offices
Preceded by Maureen O'Connor	Republican nominee for Lieutenant Governor of Ohio; 2002	Succeeded by Tom Raga
Political offices
Preceded by Maureen O'Connor	Lieutenant Governor of Ohio; 2003–2005	Succeeded by Bruce E. Johnson
Preceded by Joseph T. Deters	Ohio State Treasurer; 2005–2007	Succeeded by Richard Cordray
