= Marilyn Zayas =

American judge

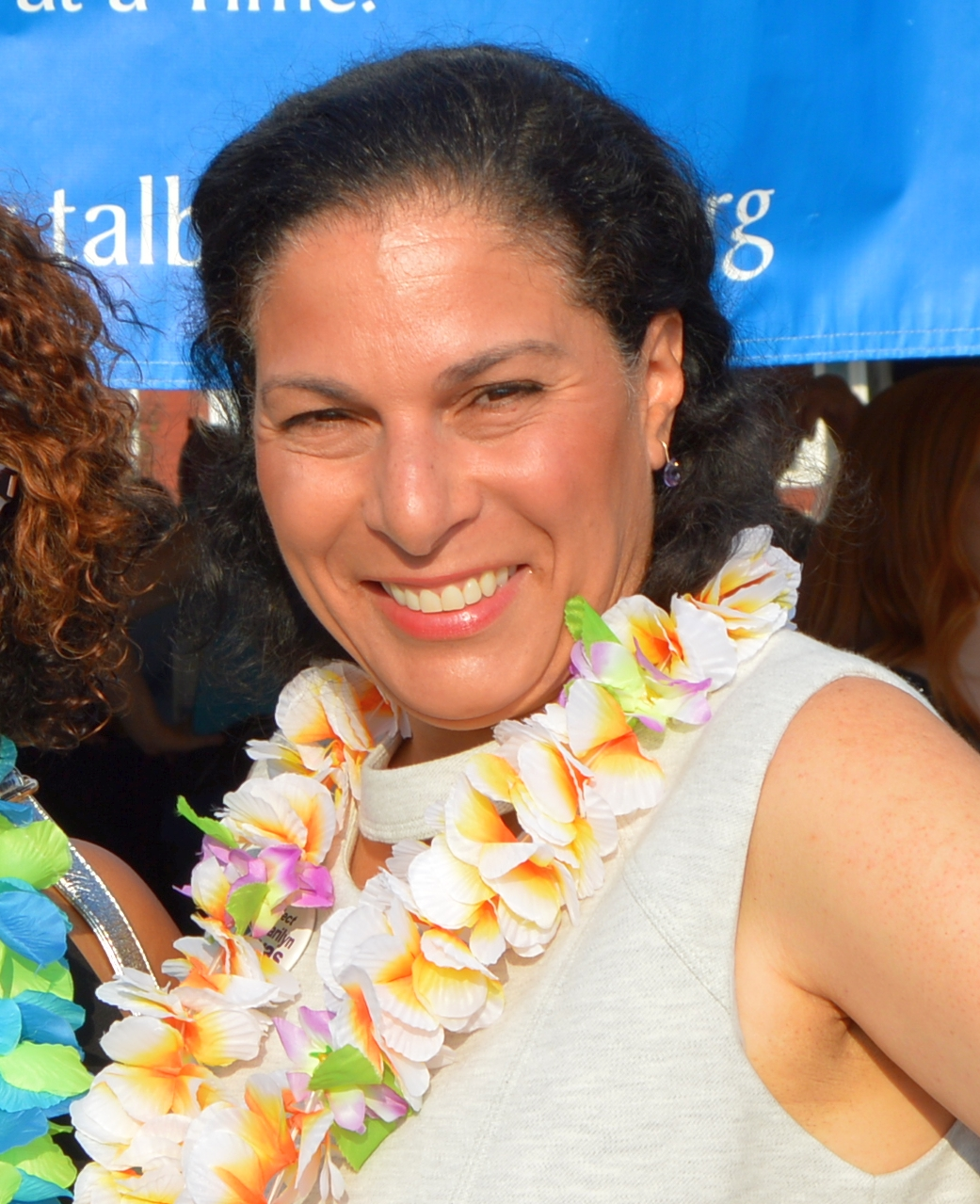
- Zayas in 2018

Justice-elect of the Ohio Supreme Court
- Assuming office January 1, 2027
- Succeeding: Dan Hawkins

Judge of the Ohio District Court of Appeals from the 1st district
- Incumbent
- Assumed office November 6, 2016
- Preceded by: Peter Stautberg

Personal details
- Born: 1964 (age 61–62) New York City, New York, U.S.
- Party: Democratic
- Education: City University of New York, City College (BS); University of Cincinnati (JD)
- Website: Campaign website

Marilyn Zayas (born 1964) is a judge on Hamilton County's First District Court of Appeals. In 2016, Zayas became the first person of Latino heritage elected to a Court of Appeals in Ohio; she was re-elected in 2018. In June 2018, she was selected by the Chief Justice to sit as a visiting judge on a case at the Supreme Court of Ohio, becoming the first Latina judge to hear a case on Ohio's top court. In November 2026 she was elected to the Supreme Court of Ohio. She will take office on January 1, 2027.

== Early life and education ==
Zayas was born in 1964 in East Harlem, New York City, United States, to a family of Puerto Rican migrants who spoke little English. Her father worked in a printing shop, and her mother was a seamstress in a garment factory.

Zayas graduated from Brooklyn Technical High School, a tuition-free public magnet school where admission is by competitive examination. She earned a bachelor of science in computer science from City College of the City University of New York. She made Ohio her home in 1988 when she accepted a position at Procter & Gamble, where she worked as an IT manager from 1988 to 1994. From 1994 to 1997, Zayas attended the University of Cincinnati College of Law.

== Career ==
Zayas first joined Ohio’s First District Court of Appeals in 2016 after her election to fill an unexpired term. She was re-elected in 2018. Since joining the court, Zayas has sat by appointment of Ohio’s Chief Justice on the Ohio Supreme Court, as well as on the Second, Sixth, Eighth, and Tenth District Courts of Appeal.

Zayas created the Educating Tomorrow’s Leaders program in 2016, an educational program for high school and university students to learn about the courts, and interact with judges and attorneys.

She currently serves on the Ohio Supreme Court’s Board of Character and Fitness, the Ohio Supreme Court’s Ethics, Professionalism, and Diversity Committee, the board of the Immigrant and Refugee Law Center, and the board of Beech Acres Parenting Center.

Prior to joining the First District Court of Appeals, Zayas served the community as an attorney for nearly 20 years. She practiced law in a variety of area, in both state and federal courts, including intellectual property, labor and employment law, business and family immigration law, criminal law, and juvenile law. In 2001, she founded a private practice, MZD Law, in downtown Cincinnati.

Zayas has also served as an adjunct professor at her alma mater, the University Of Cincinnati College Of Law, and provided legal training to judges, magistrates, attorneys, and the Cincinnati FBI.

Zayas was elected to the Ohio Supreme Court on November 3, 2026.

== Awards ==
In recognition of her professional achievements and community contributions, Zayas has received several awards including:

- Good Morning America Inspiration List: Who's Making Hispanic Latinx History Right Now in 2021.
- YWCA Career Women of Achievement in 2019.
- One of Cincinnati Council's 2021 Women's Heritage Month honorees.
- University of Cincinnati College of Law Nicholas Longworth III Alumni Achievement Award in 2017
- League of United Latin American Citizens Women's National Convention Service and Commitment Award in 2014
- Ohio Commission of Hispanic and Latino Affairs, Distinguished Hispanic Ohioan Award in 2013.

== Personal life ==
Ohio has been Judge Zayas’ home for nearly 34 years. Her family includes her three adult children and two adopted rescue dogs, Thor and Sparkle Lou.

== See also ==
- List of Hispanic and Latino American jurists

Legal offices
| Preceded by Dan Hawkins | Justice of the Ohio Supreme Court; Taking office 2027 | Elect |
