= Jennifer Brunner =

American politician and judge (born 1957)

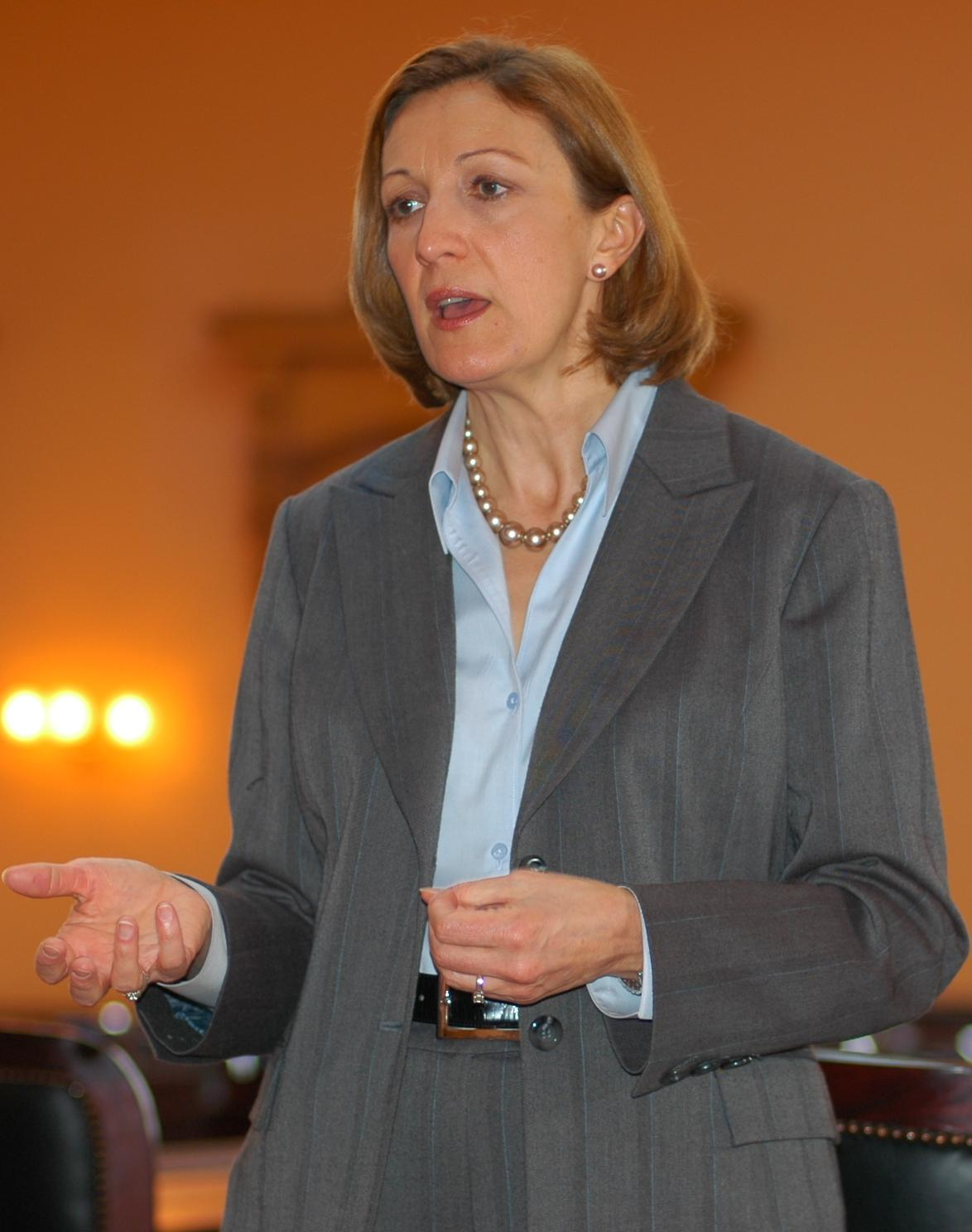
- Brunner in 2008

Justice of the Ohio Supreme Court
- Incumbent
- Assumed office January 2, 2021
- Preceded by: Judith L. French

Judge of the Ohio Court of Appeals from the 10th district
- In office January 20, 2015 – December 31, 2020
- Preceded by: Amy O'Grady
- Succeeded by: Lisa Sadler

49th Secretary of State of Ohio
- In office January 8, 2007 – January 10, 2011
- Governor: Ted Strickland
- Preceded by: Ken Blackwell
- Succeeded by: Jon Husted

Personal details
- Born: Jennifer Lee Junk; February 5, 1957 (age 69) Springfield, Ohio, U.S.
- Party: Democratic
- Spouse: Rick Brunner (m. 1978)
- Children: 3
- Education: Miami University (BA); Capital University (JD)
- Website: Campaign website

Jennifer Lee Brunner (née Junk; born February 5, 1957) is an American attorney, jurist, and former politician who has served as an associate justice of the Ohio Supreme Court since 2021. A member of the Democratic Party, Brunner also served one term as Ohio secretary of state from 2007 to 2011 and as a judge on the Ohio Tenth District Court of Appeals from 2015 to 2020. Following Supreme Court elections being made partisan in 2021, Brunner is the only statewide elected Democrat in Ohio as of 2026.

Prior to being elected secretary of state, Brunner worked in the secretary of state's office and served as a county judge in Franklin County, Ohio. Brunner unsuccessfully ran to be the Democratic nominee in the 2010 United States Senate election in Ohio. In 2022, she was defeated by fellow associate justice Sharon L. Kennedy in an election to become chief justice of the Ohio Supreme Court.

== Early life, education, and career ==
Brunner was born Jennifer Lee Junk in Springfield, Ohio, and raised in Columbus, Ohio. She graduated from Whetstone High School in the Clintonville neighborhood of Columbus. She subsequently earned a Bachelor of Arts degree in sociology and gerontology, cum laude, from Miami University in 1978 and a Juris Doctor from Capital University Law School with honors in 1982.

After graduating from law school, Brunner worked in the Ohio secretary of state's office as a deputy director and legislative counsel to the Ohio General Assembly during the administration of Sherrod Brown from 1983 to 1987, working with state legislators on finance-reporting laws for campaign committees and laws for election procedures.

From 1988 to 2000, Brunner maintained a statewide law practice focusing on election law and campaign finance. During that time she also briefly served as a member of the Franklin County Board of Elections. Brunner litigated various ballot propositions in her private practice, including propositions involving alcohol sales, tax levies, rezoning, and gambling. Brunner also represented several Ohio politicians in disputes involving redistricting and false statements in campaign literature.

In the early 1990s, Brunner served on the Ohio Student Loan Commission, a nine-member group that guarantees loans for college students. In 1995, Brunner applied for a vacant seat on the Columbus City Council, but was not selected.

In 2000, Brunner was elected to an unexpired term on the Franklin County Common Pleas Court. She was reelected in 2002. In 2004, Brunner, along with other Court of Common Pleas judges, created a separate drug court to reduce addiction-related recidivism.

== Ohio secretary of state (2007–2011) ==
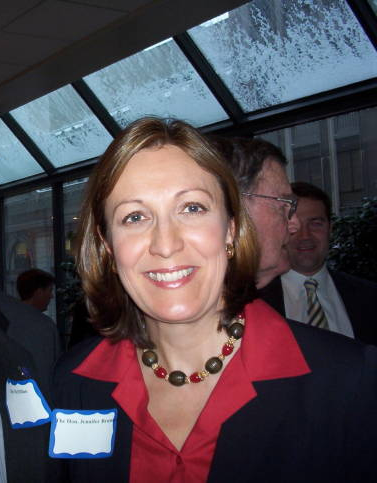
Brunner in 2006

Brunner resigned from the Franklin County Common Pleas Court on September 1, 2005, to run for Ohio secretary of state. She ran unopposed in the May 2, 2006, Democratic Primary. Her campaign received support from the Secretary of State Project, a progressive political action committee. Brunner defeated Republican nominee Greg Hartmann by a 55%–40% margin, taking office on January 8, 2007.

During her tenure as secretary of state, Brunner took several measures intended to improve election security and expand access to voting, including redistributing voting machines to precincts with long voting wait times and providing a higher number of paper ballots to precincts. Brunner also established the Voting Right Institute (VRI) to improve voter access to elections in Ohio. The VRI instituted a "Grads Vote" program which supplies voter registration forms to all graduating high school seniors, partnered with the U.S. Postal Service to include voter registration forms in government moving packets, and partnered with the Overseas Vote Foundation to improve online absentee ballot applications for overseas and military voters. She also worked to shield social security information and other private information from public view for millions of online records and coordinated with the Ohio General Assembly to prevent the filing of private information.

In September 2007, Brunner announced plans to identify and correct security and reliability problems with voting machines in advance of March 4, 2008, Ohio Democratic and Republican primaries. In particular, she expressed concern about local election officials taking voting machines home with them in the days before an election, and she ordered bipartisan transport teams for voting machines and proscribed storage conditions. She also advocated the replacement of all Ohio voting machines with paper ballots counted by optical scanning machines, although the Ohio General Assembly did not provide funding to switch to paper ballots for the November 2008 general election.

During the 2008 presidential primaries, Ohio experienced record voter turnout, but the primary was marred by paper ballot shortages, bomb threats, ice storms and power failures. In addition, flooding forced the relocation of some polling places in southeastern Ohio. 21 precincts in the Cleveland metropolitan area were held open for an extra 90 minutes due to paper ballot shortages.

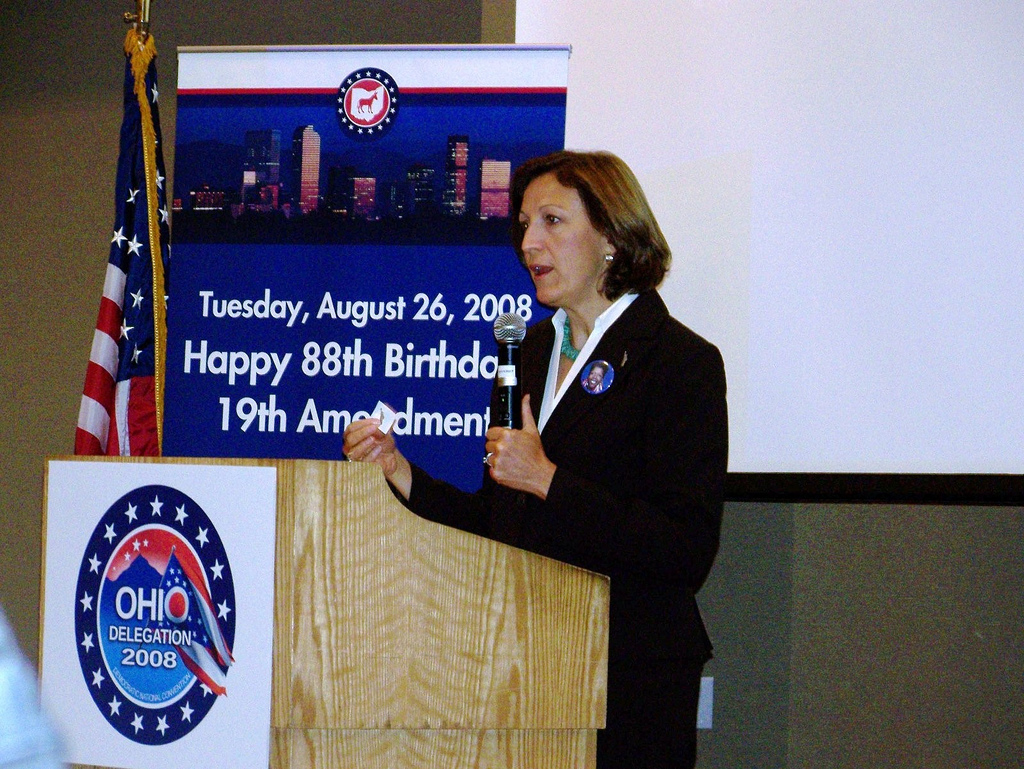
Brunner speaks in Denver during the 2008 Democratic National Convention

Between January 1, 2008, and mid-October 2008, over 666,000 Ohioans registered to vote either for the first time or with updated voter information, and over 200,000 of them provided driver's licenses or Social Security numbers that do not match government records. Many of the newly registered voters were the result of voter registration drives to register voters for Barack Obama and Hillary Clinton for the March 4, 2008 Ohio Democratic primary. The voter registrations that did not match government records were challenged in federal court, on the basis that they did not comply with the federal Help America Vote Act, which mandates that states corroborate voter registration applications with government databases. The United States Court of Appeals for the Sixth Circuit ruled against Brunner, deciding that extra steps must be taken to authenticate these registrants. However, that decision subsequently was overturned by the U.S. Supreme Court.

During the 2008 general election, Ohio experienced an unintended consequence of a new statute that resulted in a brief period of overlap voting, when absentee voting has started and before the close of voter registration. This period ran from September 30 until October 6, due to the newly instituted early voting policy. On August 13, 2008, Brunner ordered county election board officials to establish procedures to enable voters who register to be immediately issued an absentee ballot. Brunner's order was challenged in state and federal court by Ohio Republican Party officials and Republican voters, who argued that Ohio law requires voters to be registered for 30 days before they cast an absentee ballot. Brunner's order ultimately was upheld by both state and federal courts.

In November 2008, two supporters of Republican congressman Steve Stivers supporters sued Brunner over the validity of approximately 1,000 provisional ballots in the race for Ohio's 15th congressional district, which at the time of recounting had a 149-vote margin with and 27,000 absentee ballots still to be counted. The case was consolidated with other cases in the United States District Court upon Brunner's request. On December 5, 2008, Stivers' supporters won a ruling in the Ohio Supreme Court that the 1,000 provisional ballots that lacked signatures or had names and signatures in the wrong places be thrown out.

== 2010 U.S. Senate campaign and international work ==
On February 17, 2009, Brunner announced that she would be a candidate for the U.S. Senate in the 2010 United States Senate election in Ohio, running against Lieutenant Governor Lee Fisher for the Democratic nomination. In September 2009, DSCC Chairman Bob Menendez, who supported Fisher and had been trying to clear the field for him, stated he would actively work against any underfunded candidate. By February 2010, Brunner had significantly less cash on hand than Fisher or likely general election opponent Rob Portman (who would eventually win the seat), but claimed, "I only need enough money to win." Polling in late 2009 and January 2010 showed Brunner to be more competitive than Fisher in a general election matchup against Portman, while Fisher and Brunner were deadlocked in Democratic primary polling. Brunner ultimately lost to Fisher in the May 4, 2010, party primary, 55% to 45%.

Following her defeat in the 2010 Senate primary, Brunner sat on several public commissions and boards. Republican Governor John Kasich appointed Brunner to a Democratic seat on the Ohio Cultural Facilities Commission in 2011, which she held until the commission's abolition in 2013. In October 2012, Kasich also appointed her to the Ohio Counselor, Social Worker, Marriage and Family Therapist Board. In 2013, Columbus Mayor Michael B. Coleman appointed Brunner to the board of the Central Ohio Transit Authority.

Brunner worked with the United States Agency for International Development (USAID) as a consultant on campaign finance, elections, and ballot issues in the Republic of Serbia during 2012 and 2013, assisting the Serbian Minister of Justice with judicial reform. Brunner also served as an adviser to Serbian misdemeanor court judges as part of its Judicial Reform and Government Accountability project on outreach strategies to rebuild the public's confidence in elections systems and to better detect and prevent corruption in the government. Brunner also served as an international election observer in Egypt for the 2014 Egyptian constitutional referendum.

== Ohio appellate court and supreme court (2015–present) ==
Brunner was certified as the sole Democratic candidate running for the Ohio Tenth District Court of Appeals seat occupied by incumbent judge Amy O'Grady, who was appointed to the seat by Governor John Kasich in 2013. The 2014 judicial elections were notable for the number of judges on the ballot, with The Columbus Dispatch stating that it was the first time 12 contested judicial seats would appear on the ballot in Franklin County, Ohio. She was the only Democratic nominee for the appellate seat. Brunner defeated O'Grady and was elected to a two-year term as Franklin County appeals judge unexpired term in the General Election.

In August 2019, Brunner announced her candidacy to be a justice of the Supreme Court of Ohio, challenging incumbent Judith L. French. On November 3, 2020, she went on to win the general election with 55% of the vote.

On June 8, 2021, Brunner announced her candidacy for Chief Justice of the Ohio Supreme Court in the November 8, 2022, general election. In a virtual news conference on September 13, 2021, Brunner released a campaign platform that includes support for a statewide criminal sentencing database, a proposal for a permanent Commission on Fairness and Equality in Ohio's Courts and Legal System, expansion of specialized dockets like drug courts, and what the Cleveland Plain Dealer called "good-government reforms." At the general election held on November 8, 2022, she was defeated by her Republican opponent, fellow associate justice Sharon Kennedy, winning less than 44% of the vote. Brunner was re-elected as a justice of the Supreme Court of Ohio in the November 3, 2026 elections.

== Personal life ==
Brunner is a resident of Columbus, Ohio. She and her husband, Rick, have been married since 1978 and have three adult children. They have also been foster parents to three children.

In March 2008, Brunner was awarded the Profile in Courage Award by the John F. Kennedy Presidential Library and Museum for challenging the reliability of electronic voting in order to protect the right to vote in Ohio. Brunner is a Member of the Advisory Board of the Global Panel Foundation, an NGO that works in conflict areas around the world.

== General election results ==
Office	Year	Votes for Brunner	%	Republican	Votes	%	Non-Partisan	Votes	%	Non-Partisan	Votes	%
Judge of the Franklin County Court of Common Pleas	2000	147,487	50.9	John Bender	141,567	49.1						
Judge of the Franklin County Court of Common Pleas	2002	109,713	51.8	Michael J. Holbrook	102,050	48.2						
Ohio Secretary of State	2006	2,104,114	55.0	Greg Hartmann	1,546,454	40.5	John A. Eastman	94,706	2.5	Timothy J. Kettler	78,080	2.0
Ohio's Tenth District Court of Appeals	2014	124,701	53.1	Amy O'Grady	110,293	46.9						
Ohio's Tenth District Court of Appeals	2016	340,698	100.0									
Ohio Supreme Court	2020	2,695,072	55.3	Jennifer French	2,174,820	44.7						
Ohio Supreme Court Chief Justice	2022	1,807,133	43.9	Sharon Kennedy	2,307,415	56.1						
Ohio Supreme Court	2026	2,326,703	51.4%	Colleen O'Donnell	2,203,449	48.6%						

== Notes ==
Party political offices
Preceded by Bryan Flannery	Democratic nominee for Ohio Secretary of State; 2006	Succeeded by Maryellen O'Shaughnessy
Political offices
Preceded by Ken Blackwell	Secretary of State of Ohio; 2007–2011	Succeeded by Jon A. Husted
Legal offices
Preceded by Judith L. French	Associate Justice of the Ohio Supreme Court; 2021–present	Incumbent
