= Maureen O'Connor (judge) =

American judge (born 1951)

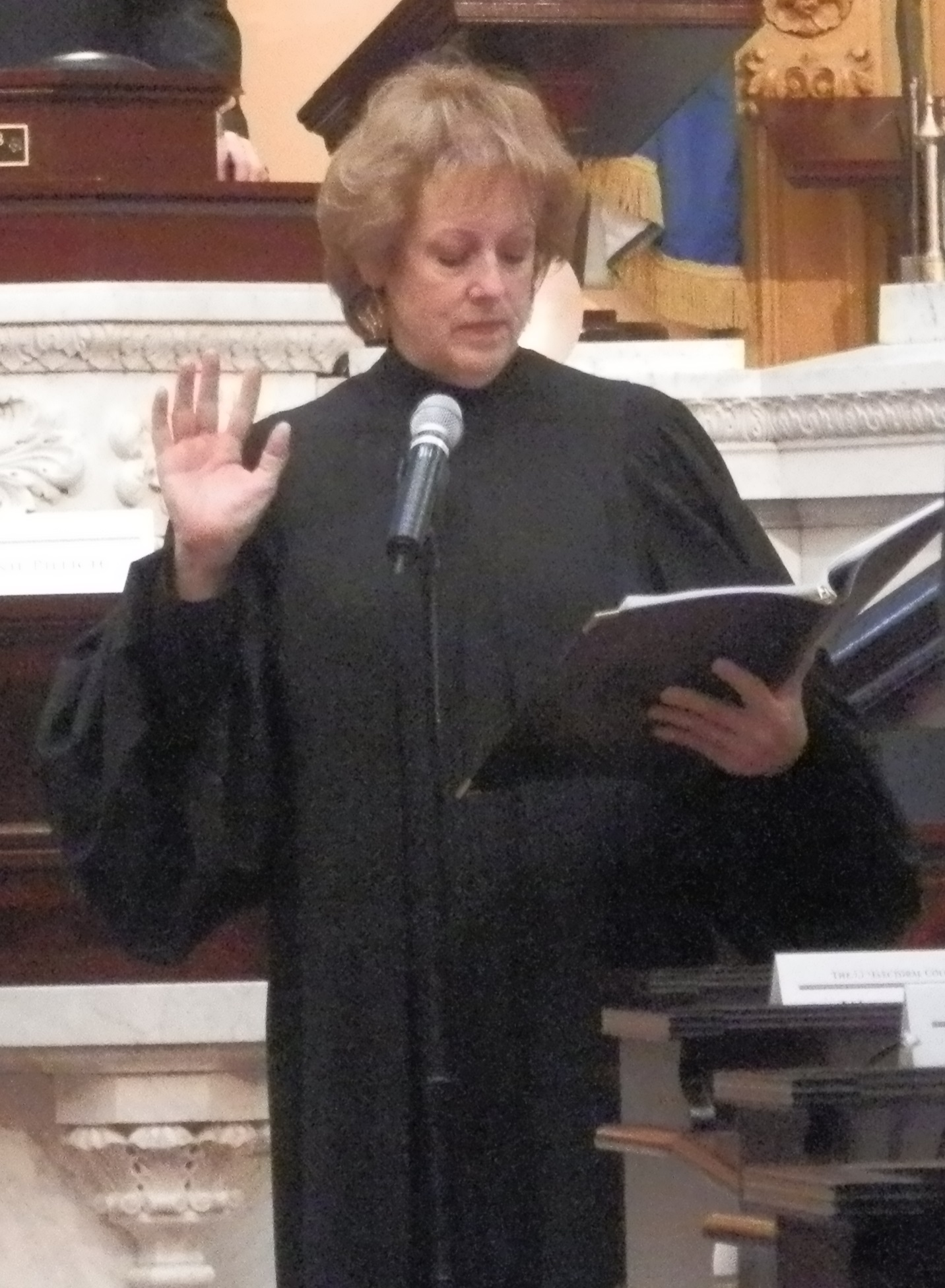
- O'Connor in 2012

Chief Justice of the Ohio Supreme Court
- In office January 1, 2011 – December 31, 2022
- Preceded by: Eric Brown
- Succeeded by: Sharon L. Kennedy

Associate Justice of the Ohio Supreme Court
- In office January 1, 2003 – December 31, 2010
- Preceded by: Andrew Douglas
- Succeeded by: Yvette McGee Brown

61st Lieutenant Governor of Ohio
- In office January 11, 1999 – December 31, 2002
- Governor: Bob Taft
- Preceded by: Nancy Hollister
- Succeeded by: Jennette Bradley

Personal details
- Born: August 7, 1951 (age 75) Washington, D.C., U.S.
- Party: Republican
- Education: Seton Hill University (BA); Cleveland State University (JD)

Maureen O'Connor (born August 7, 1951) is an American lawyer and judge who served as the chief justice of the Ohio Supreme Court from 2011 to 2022. She was elected to the court in 2002, becoming chief justice in 2010. She was the first woman to lead the Ohio Supreme Court and the longest serving woman elected statewide in Ohio's History.

Prior to this, O'Connor served as an associate justice of the Ohio Supreme Court and as the 61st lieutenant governor of Ohio, serving under Governor Bob Taft. She is a Republican.

== Education and experience ==
O'Connor earned a bachelor's degree at Seton Hill University, Greensburg, Pennsylvania in 1973 and a Juris Doctor degree at the Cleveland State University College of Law in 1980. In 1981, O'Connor began practicing law in Summit County, Ohio. In 1985, she was appointed a magistrate of the Summit County Probate Court. She was then elected as a judge of the Summit County Court of Common Pleas, serving on the bench from 1993 to 1995. In 1994, she was elected to the office of Summit County prosecutor and served in that office from 1995 to 1999. O'Connor received "The Cleveland State University Distinguished Alumnae Award for Civic Achievement" in 1997.

== Service as Ohio lieutenant governor ==
In 1998, O'Connor was selected by Bob Taft to be his running mate for the November election. The ticket was victorious and O'Connor was elected Ohio's 61st lieutenant governor serving in that office from 1999 until she resigned at the end of 2002.

== Ohio Supreme Court tenure ==
In 2002, O'Connor ran for and was elected to the Ohio Supreme Court, defeating Democrat Timothy Black. She began serving in 2003. She was reelected in 2008 with 67.14% of the vote against Democrat Joseph Russo. O'Connor defeated Chief Justice Eric Brown in the 2010 general election with 67.59% of the vote. Brown had been appointed chief justice by Gov. Ted Strickland in May 2010 after the death of Thomas J. Moyer. She is the sixth woman to have served as an Ohio Supreme Court justice and is the first woman to hold the post of chief justice.

For the 2016 election, the Democratic Party did not field a candidate to run against O'Connor.

She was described as an "independent voice" on the Ohio Supreme Court. She dissented on a ruling that upheld the forced closure of the last abortion clinic in Toledo, Ohio; she has expressed support for criminal justice reform; and called for less partisan influence in how judges are selected in Ohio.

In 2022, O'Connor was the deciding vote in a ruling that struck down a heavily pro-Republican gerrymandered redistricting map. She criticized how Republicans abused the redistricting process. After her vote, Ohio Republicans called for impeaching her. O'Connor retired in 2023 as she was unable to run for another term.

After her retirement, O'Connor joined the campaign of Citizens Not Politicians Ohio, which placed an unsuccessful amendment on the 2024 ballot to replace the Ohio Redistricting Commission with an independent citizens' redistricting commission.

She is a senior fellow at the Kettering Foundation, an American non-partisan research foundation.

== See also ==
- List of justices of the Ohio Supreme Court
- List of Cleveland–Marshall College of Law alumni
- List of female lieutenant governors in the United States

Party political offices
Preceded by Nancy Hollister	Republican nominee for Lieutenant Governor of Ohio; 1998	Succeeded by Jennette Bradley
Political offices
Preceded by Nancy Hollister	Lieutenant Governor of Ohio; 1999–2002	Succeeded by Jennette Bradley
Legal offices
Preceded by Andrew Douglas	Associate Justice of the Ohio Supreme Court; 2003–2010	Succeeded by Yvette McGee Brown
Preceded by Eric Brown	Chief Justice of the Ohio Supreme Court; 2011–2022	Succeeded by Sharon L. Kennedy
