= Sharon L. Kennedy =

American judge (born 1962)

Sharon Kennedy

Chief Justice of the Ohio Supreme Court
- Incumbent
- Assumed office January 1, 2023
- Preceded by: Maureen O'Connor

Associate Justice of the Ohio Supreme Court
- In office December 7, 2012 – December 31, 2022
- Preceded by: Yvette McGee Brown
- Succeeded by: Joe Deters

Personal details
- Born: March 15, 1962 (age 63); Hamilton County, Ohio, U.S.
- Political party: Republican
- Education: University of Cincinnati (BA, JD)

Sharon Lee Kennedy (born March 15, 1962) is an American jurist who has served as chief justice of the Ohio Supreme Court since 2023. She was first elected to the court as an associate justice in 2012 after serving as a judge of the Butler County Court of Common Pleas from 1999 to 2012.

== Early life and education ==
Sharon Lee Kennedy was born March 15, 1962 in Hamilton County, Ohio. She graduated from Northwest High School in 1980, and from the University of Cincinnati School of Social Work with a bachelor's degree in 1984 and she received a Juris Doctor from the University of Cincinnati College of Law in 1991.

== Professional career ==
Kennedy was a police officer with the Hamilton, Ohio Police Department from 1985 to 1989. She was then a law clerk for Judge Matthew J. Crehan and director of the victim/witness division for the Butler County Court of Common Pleas from 1989 to 1991.

After graduating from law school, Kennedy was in private practice from 1991 to 1998; during the same time period she served as disciplinary counsel for the Fraternal Order of Police, Lodge 38, representing police officers during disciplinary hearings. From 1995 to 1998, she was special counsel for then-Ohio Attorney General Betty Montgomery. From 1995 to 1998, she was the magistrate and warrant officer for the Butler County Area Courts. From 1996 to 1997, she was a warrant and compliance officer of the Butler County Juvenile Court.

== Judicial career ==
=== Butler County Court of Common Pleas ===
From 1999 to 2012, Kennedy was judge of the Court of Common Pleas, Domestic Relations Division, for Butler County. She also served concurrently as administrative judge from 2005 to 2012.

=== Ohio Supreme Court ===
Kennedy entered the March 6, 2012 Republican Party primary election for the unexpired term ending December 31, 2014, on the Supreme Court of Ohio. She ran unopposed, and received 753,072 votes. On November 6, 2012, she defeated incumbent Democratic candidate Yvette McGee Brown, who had been appointed to the seat on January 1, 2011, by Governor Ted Strickland. She was sworn in December 7, 2012, after the election was certified.

==== Judicial ethics ====
Kennedy's ethics were questioned in 2022 after she spoke to a Republican organization and called the issue of redistricting "the fight of our life," and made accusations about progressive groups and individuals, including those who are parties to cases pending before the court.

==== 2022 Campaign for chief justice ====
Kennedy, who was re-elected in 2020, ran to replace Maureen O'Connor as Chief Justice of the Ohio Supreme Court. Her opponent was fellow associate justice, Democrat Jennifer Brunner. Kennedy went on to win the race.

== Personal ==
Kennedy is single. She lives in Liberty Township, Butler County, Ohio. She has been a member of the Butler County Bar Association since 1991 and a member of the Federalist Society since 2012.

Legal offices
Preceded by Yvette McGee Brown	Associate Justice of the Ohio Supreme Court; 2012–2022	Succeeded by Joe Deters
Preceded by Maureen O'Connor	Chief Justice of the Ohio Supreme Court; 2023–present	Incumbent
