= Sandra O'Brien =

American politician

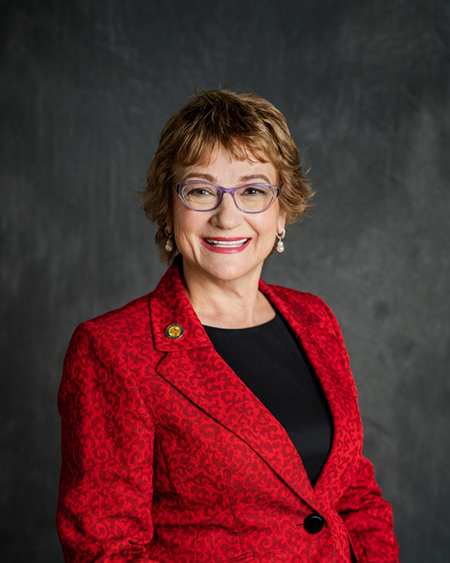
- Official portrait c. 2021

Member of the Ohio Senate from the 32nd district
- Incumbent
- Assumed office January 1, 2021
- Preceded by: Sean O'Brien

Personal details
- Party: Republican
- Education: Bowling Green University (BA); Edinboro University (Master of Educational Administration)

Sandra O'Brien is a Republican member of the Ohio Senate representing the 32nd district. She was elected in 2020, defeating Democratic incumbent Sean O'Brien with just under 51% of the vote.

== Abortion legislation ==
In 2019, O'Brien co-sponsored Ohio Senate Bill 23, widely known as the "Heartbeat Bill." The law bans most abortions after the detection of a fetal heartbeat, which typically occurs around six weeks into pregnancy—before many people know they are pregnant. The bill makes no exceptions for rape or incest. Governor Mike DeWine signed the bill into law on April 11, 2019.

O'Brien’s co-sponsorship of SB 23 reflected her alignment with efforts to impose stricter abortion regulations in Ohio. The legislation sparked significant legal and public controversy.

In September 2022, a judge in Hamilton County temporarily blocked the law’s enforcement, restoring abortion access in the state up to 22 weeks of pregnancy while litigation continued.

Party political offices
Preceded by Joe Deters	Republican nominee for Ohio State Treasurer; 2006	Succeeded by Josh Mandel
