= Daniel R. Hawkins =

American judge (born 1975 or 1976)

Daniel Hawkins

Justice of the Ohio Supreme Court
- Incumbent
- Assumed office December 10, 2024
- Preceded by: Joe Deters

Personal details
- Born: 1975 or 1976 (age 50–51) Columbus, Ohio, U.S.
- Party: Republican
- Education: Bowling Green State University (BS); Ohio State University (JD)

Daniel R. Hawkins (born 1975 or 1976) is an American lawyer who has served as a justice of the Ohio Supreme Court since 2024. He was a judge of the Franklin County Court of Common Pleas from 2019 to 2024.

== Early life and education ==
Hawkins was born in Columbus, Ohio. He graduated from St. Francis DeSales High School. attended Bowling Green State University, receiving a Bachelor of Science in criminal justice in 1998. He received a Juris Doctor from Ohio State University Moritz College of Law in 2001.

== Career ==
From 2001 to 2013, Hawkins served as an assistant prosecuting attorney and director of the Special Victims Unit for the Franklin County Prosecutor's Office. From 2013 to 2019, he was a judge of the Franklin County Municipal Court Environmental Division. He served as a judge of the Franklin County Court of Common Pleas from 2019 to 2024.

=== Ohio Supreme Court ===
In May 2023, Hawkins announced his candidacy for a seat on the Ohio Supreme Court; becoming one of six candidates running for three seats. Hawkins was endorsed by the Ohio Republican Party. Hawkins was elected to the Ohio Supreme Court in the 2024 election held on November 5, 2024 and assumed office on December 10, 2024. Justice Hawkins lost his bid for reelection to the Ohio Supreme Court on November 3, 2026.

Legal offices
Preceded by Joe Deters	Justice of the Ohio Supreme Court; 2024–present	Incumbent
