= Joe Deters =

American judge (born 1957)

Justice of the Ohio Supreme Court
- Incumbent
- Assumed office January 2, 2025
- Preceded by: Melody J. Stewart
- In office January 3, 2023 – December 10, 2024
- Appointed by: Mike DeWine
- Preceded by: Sharon L. Kennedy
- Succeeded by: Daniel R. Hawkins

44th Treasurer of Ohio
- In office January 11, 1999 – January 5, 2005
- Governor: Bob Taft
- Preceded by: Ken Blackwell
- Succeeded by: Jennette Bradley

Personal details
- Born: Joseph Theodore Deters; April 4, 1957 (age 69) Cincinnati, Ohio, U.S.
- Party: Republican
- Education: University of Cincinnati (BA, JD)

Joseph Theodore Deters (born April 4, 1957) is an American lawyer and jurist who has served as a justice on the Ohio Supreme Court since 2023. A member of the Republican Party, he was previously the prosecuting attorney of Hamilton County, Ohio, from 1992 to 1999 and again from 2005 to 2023, as well as Ohio state treasurer from 1999 to 2005.

== Early life and education ==
Deters is the oldest of eight children born to Nancy and Donald Deters. His grandfather, Daniel Tehan, was a longtime Hamilton County Sheriff.

Deters graduated from St. Xavier High School in 1975. He graduated with a bachelor's degree from the University of Cincinnati in 1979, and received his Juris Doctor from the University of Cincinnati College of Law in 1982.

== Career ==
Deters began his career in public service in 1982 as an Assistant Hamilton County Prosecutor. Six years later in 1988 he was elected as Hamilton County's Clerk of Courts. He returned to the Hamilton County Prosecutor's office in 1992 after being appointed and later elected Prosecuting Attorney. He was re-elected Prosecuting Attorney in 1996.

In 1999, Deters was sworn in as Ohio's 44th State Treasurer where he was responsible for collecting, managing, and investing more than $11 billion in assets for the State of Ohio. During his tenure, the Ohio Treasurer's Office received 23 national awards for innovation and technology and earned interest on investments faster than any prior administration.

In the fall of 2004, Deters' commitment to his young family and love for his hometown brought him back to Cincinnati where he once again ran for Hamilton County Prosecuting Attorney. In an historic write-in campaign for Prosecutor, Deters won 60% of the vote. On January 2, 2005, he was soon sworn in yet again as Hamilton County Prosecutor and was subsequently re-elected in 2008, 2012, 2016, and 2020, making him Hamilton County's longest tenured prosecuting attorney.

As county prosecutor, Deters has managed high-profile cases that have attracted national and international attention. In 1987, he led the investigation of Donald Harvey, a convicted serial killer who pleaded guilty to murdering 37 people while working as a hospital orderly. Approximately 30 years later, he prosecuted his fifth serial killer, Samuel Little, who murdered two Cincinnati women over the course of a 30-year killing spree. In total, Deters has prosecuted six serial killers.

In 2012, Deters was critical of Xavier University for expelling Dezmine Wells, one of its basketball players, due to a rape allegation. Prior to the school holding a hearing on the matter, a grand jury had refused to prosecute Wells. Deters, who has been described as being tough on crime, said the prosecutor's office had conducted a thorough investigation —maintaining that the accusation lacked any credibility and the decision "wasn't even close." He said that the school proceedings had egregiously violated Wells' right to a fair hearing by putting the burden of proof on Wells instead of his accuser, had assigned incompetent staff to examine the forensic evidence, and prevented Wells from presenting evidence which would have proven his innocence. After learning of Xavier's decision, he called for the university to reexamine Wells' expulsion.

On July 29, 2015, Deters oversaw the indictment of University of Cincinnati police officer Ray Tensing in the killing of Sam DuBose during a traffic stop. He called the killing "totally unwarranted" and "senseless." His comments regarding the killing received some criticism from the public. Many critics also pointed to the published comments of the editorial board of the Cincinnati Enquirer which had previously criticized Deters for his remarks about a violent assault earlier that month which he had decided not to charge as a racially motivated crime.

Nevertheless, the office worked quickly to complete the investigation, filing charges just 10 days after the initial shooting. However, a divided jury failed to reach a verdict on two separate occasions, prompting Deters’ announcement that the County would not try the case a third time.

Following a violent 2021 Fourth of July weekend in Cincinnati, which included a shooting at a downtown park, Deters announced that the office would no longer offer plea bargains in any cases involving gun violence or possession of illegal firearms. He added, “People must be held accountable for their choices. As a community, we must stand together and say ‘enough is enough.’”

=== Ohio Supreme Court ===
In late 2022, Governor Mike DeWine appointed Deters to the Ohio Supreme Court. He was sworn in on January 7, 2023, as the 163rd justice of the court. In February 2023, Xavier University announced that Deters would be serving as their inaugural Justice in Residence, an unpaid, voluntary position intended to engage students in dialogue as well as to mentor students interested in pursuing careers in law.

== Political positions ==
Throughout his tenure, Deters has gained a reputation for being a “tough on crime” prosecutor, believing in strict punishments for violent crime, including the death penalty. He has maintained this stance, even after a Vatican official rebuked him, a Roman Catholic, for pursuing the death penalty for serial killer Anthony Kirkland. Kirkland pled guilty to the aggravated murder of two teenage girls and two adult women committed between 2006 and 2009. Kirkland burned the bodies of all four of his victims, leaving their charred remains in remote or wooded areas. Responding to the official, Deters said:

My dear friends who are priests don't understand what we're dealing with. There is evil in this world and there comes a point where society needs to defend itself.

As Prosecutor, Deters has repeated that he took an oath to uphold Ohio law, which includes the death penalty, and that he doesn't get to personally decide which laws to enforce. To critics, he states, “If the citizens of Ohio want the law changed, they should contact their state representative and let him or her know. I have no quarrel with that.”

However, since assuming office, Deters has also supported numerous diversion programs, aiming to help “low-level, nonviolent offenders avoid jail time, find rehabilitation, and get their lives back on track.” In 2010, he helped establish Ohio's first ever drug court in Hamilton County. Other programs his office have sponsored include Mental Health Court, Juvenile Diversion Program, and CHANGE Court, a specialized court serving those charged with prostitution and related offenses.

== Affiliations ==
Deters is a former member of the Cincinnati Bar Association, National District Attorneys Association, and Ohio Prosecuting Attorneys Association. He previously served on the University of Cincinnati Board of Trustees, Ohio Organized Crime Commission, and the Southern Ohio Leukemia Foundation.

== Personal life ==
He has four children, two step-children and two grandchilden. He has been married to Tanya O'Rourke since October 2021. https://www.ohiobar.org/about-us/media-center/osba-news/member-spotlights/member-spotlight-special-edition-justice-joseph-t-deters/

== Electoral history ==
=== 1988 - Clerk of Courts Election ===
In 1988, Deters was appointed Hamilton County Clerk of Courts and sought election to the office that year. He campaigned on the platform to revitalize and modernize the office, which he had previously described as operating in “the Dark Ages.” Upon winning election, he first adopted a zero-tolerance policy concerning theft in the office, aggressively pursuing employees who embezzled funds. He also ceased the practice of political payroll deductions, which, at the time, had been prevalent within many county offices across Ohio. As Clerk, he administered a yearly budget of more than 10 million dollars.

=== 1992 - Hamilton County Prosecuting Attorney Election ===
In 1992, Deters was appointed Hamilton County Prosecutor and sought election to the office later that year. As a candidate, he led the ticket for administrative offices, promising to implement policies and innovations that would elevate the office to a higher level, including a Victims Assistance Program, an Environmental Prosecution Unit, and a Public Corruption Unit. He easily defeated democrat Robert Gutwiller, winning 64 percent of the vote.

=== 1996 - Hamilton County Prosecuting Attorney Election ===
In 1996, Deters ran for re-election unopposed, capturing over 250,000 votes.

=== 1998 - Ohio State Treasurer Election ===
With endorsements from the Ohio Fraternal Order of Police and Ohio Certified Public Accountants, Deters sought to capture the position of State Treasurer, promising to ensure the safety of public monies and diversify the state’s debt portfolio. He defeated Democrat John Donofrio, earning 70 percent of the vote.

=== 2002 - Ohio State Treasurer Election ===
In 2002, Deters battled Democrat Mary O. Boyle, a former State Legislator, for re-election to the Treasurer seat. He pledged to continue the process of digitizing the office and receiving and distributing money electronically. He won re-election with 53 percent of the vote.

=== 2004 - Hamilton County Prosecuting Attorney Election ===
Deters entered the 2004 Prosecutor race after then-Hamilton County Prosecutor Michael K. Allen withdrew amid allegations of sexual harassment. Given that this was also a presidential election year, Deters felt it was crucial to enter so that Republicans could retain viability and legitimacy within the region. A write-in candidate, Deters faced democrat Fanon Rucker, who previously served as an assistant prosecutor for the City of Cincinnati. Deters won with 57 percent of the vote.

=== 2008 - Hamilton County Prosecuting Attorney Election ===
In 2008, Deters ran for re-election unopposed, again capturing over 250 thousand votes.

=== 2012 - Hamilton County Prosecuting Attorney Election ===
Facing former City of Cincinnati assistant prosecutor Janaya Trotter, Deters campaigned on the promise to continue removing violent offenders from the streets and ensuring the safety of Hamilton County residents. Deters defeated Trotter, garnering 59 percent of the vote.

=== 2016 - Hamilton County Prosecuting Attorney Election ===
In his bid for a sixth term, Deters faced Alan Triggs, a former assistant prosecutor and Magistrate. Deters campaigned on a similar platform, aggressively prosecuting violent criminals while seeking opportunities for diversion programs, where appropriate. He won with 54 percent of the vote.

=== 2020 - Hamilton County Prosecuting Attorney Election ===
A re-match of the 2004 write-in campaign, Deters faced and defeated Fanon Rucker in the 2020 Election. Calling it the “most satisfying” victory of his political career, Deters won after his campaign targeted voters who had become dissatisfied with then-Republican President Donald Trump, overcoming the president’s 65,000-vote deficit in Hamilton County.

=== 2024 - Supreme Court of Ohio Election ===
Having been appointed by Governor Mike DeWine in late 2022, Deters was sworn in on January 7, 2023, as Ohio's 163rd Justice of the Supreme Court. In November 2024 he sought a full six-year term running against incumbent Justice Melody Stewart. He won with 55 percent of the vote. His term expires on 1/2/2031. https://ballotpedia.org/Joseph_Deters; https://ohiocapitaljournal.com/2024/11/05/republicans-win-all-three-ohio-supreme-court-races-increasing-hold-over-court-to-6-1-ap-projects/

Party political offices
Preceded by Ken Blackwell	Republican nominee for Treasurer of Ohio; 1998, 2002	Succeeded by Sandra O'Brien
Political offices
Preceded by Ken Blackwell	Treasurer of Ohio; 1999–2005	Succeeded by Jennette Bradley
Legal offices
Preceded by Sharon L. Kennedy	Justice of the Ohio Supreme Court; 2023–2024	Succeeded by Daniel R. Hawkins
Preceded by Melody J. Stewart	Justice of the Ohio Supreme Court; 2025–present	Incumbent
