= Supreme Court of Ohio =

Highest court in the U.S. state of Ohio

Supreme Court of the State of Ohio
- Seal of the Supreme Court of Ohio
- Interactive map of Supreme Court of the State of Ohio
- 39°57′37″N 83°00′09″W
- Established: 1802
- Jurisdiction: Ohio, United States
- Location: Columbus, Ohio
- Coordinates: 39°57′37″N 83°00′09″W
- Composition method: Partisan election
- Authorized by: Ohio Constitution
- Appeals to: Supreme Court of the United States
- Judge term length: 6 years (mandatory retirement at the age of 70)
- Number of positions: 7
- Website: Official Website

Chief Justice
- Currently: Sharon L. Kennedy
- Since: January 1, 2023
- Lead position ends: December 31, 2028
- Jurist term ends: 2032

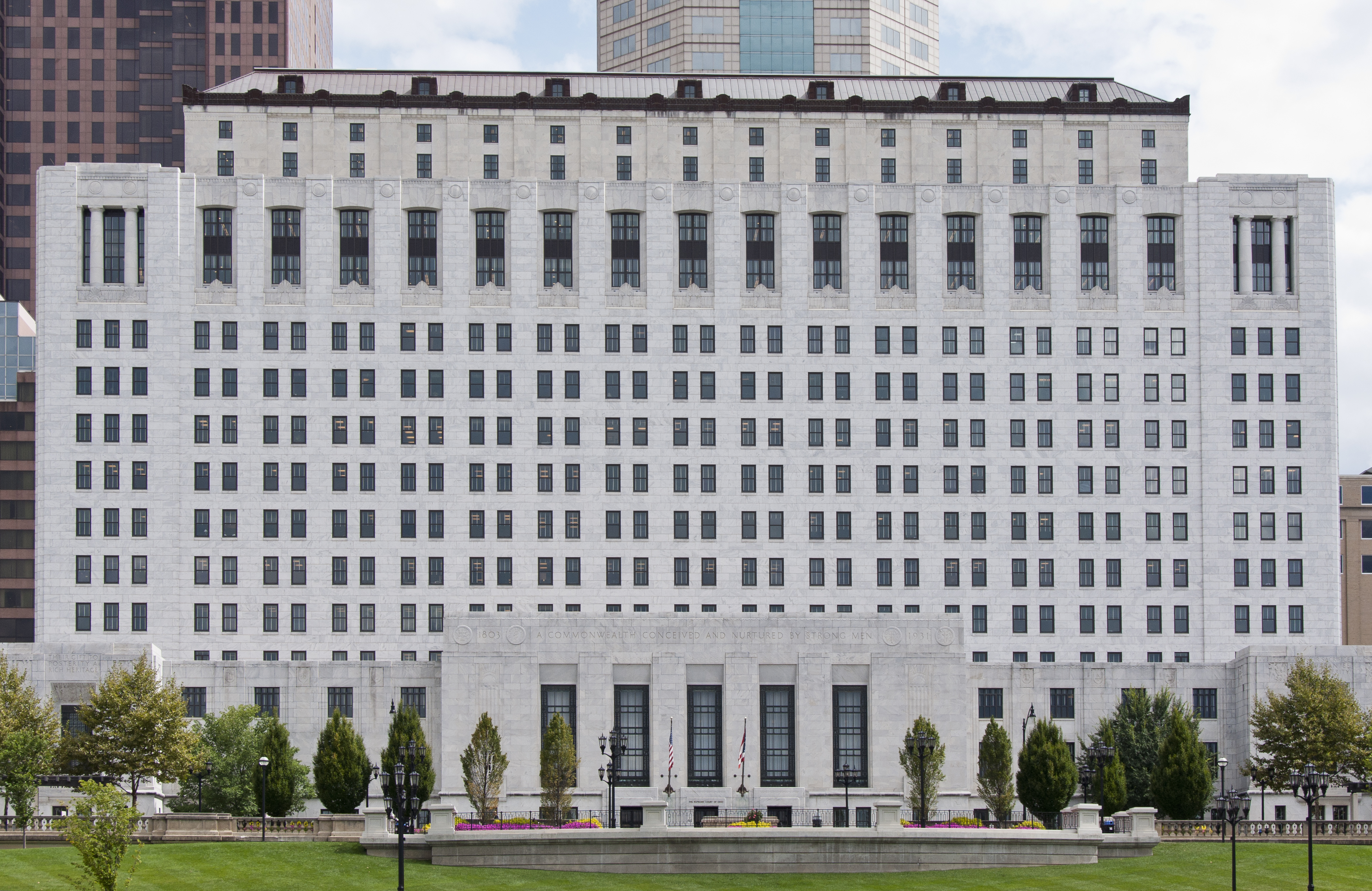
The Thomas J. Moyer Ohio Judicial Center in Columbus

The Supreme Court of the State of Ohio is the highest court in the U.S. state of Ohio, with final authority over interpretations of Ohio law and the Ohio Constitution. The court has seven members, a chief justice and six associate justices, who are elected at large by the voters of Ohio for six-year terms. The court has a total of 1,550 other employees. Since 2004, the court has met in the Thomas J. Moyer Ohio Judicial Center (formerly known as the Ohio Departments Building) on the east bank of the Scioto River in Downtown Columbus. Prior to 2004, the court met in the James A. Rhodes State Office Tower and earlier in the Judiciary Annex (now the Senate Building) of the Ohio Statehouse.

The Ohio Supreme Court and the rest of the judiciary is established and authorized within Article IV of the Ohio Constitution.

== History ==
The Supreme Court of Ohio was founded in 1802, established in the state constitution as a three-member court, holding courts in each county every year. The constitution was approved that year, one year before statehood. In 1823, the state legislature ordered the court to meet annually in Columbus. It was located in the Ohio Statehouse beginning in 1857, and moved into the Statehouse Annex in 1901. The first female justice on the court was Florence E. Allen who served from 1923 to 1934. In 1974, the court moved from the annex building to the Rhodes State Office Tower. It moved to the Ohio Judicial Center in 2004.

=== Notable cases ===
In DeRolph v. State (1997) the Supreme Court of Ohio found that Ohio's method of funding its schools was unconstitutional. The case originated in the Perry County Schools.

In Mapp v. Ohio (1961), the U.S. Supreme Court reversed the Supreme Court of Ohio, and found that evidence seized unlawfully without a search warrant cannot be used in criminal prosecutions.

== Justices ==
All the seats on the court are elected at large by the voters of Ohio. Every two years, two of the associate justice seats are up for election to a six-year term. For one of those three elections in a six-year cycle, the chief justice's seat is also up for election. In order to run for a seat on the court, a person must be admitted to the bar in Ohio, and have practiced as a lawyer or served as a judge for at least six years. There is an age limit: One may not run for a seat on any Ohio court if one is more than 70 years of age. This limit often forces the retirement of long-time justices. Justice Francis E. Sweeney, Sr., was barred by this rule from running for re-election in 2004, as was Justice Terrence O'Donnell in 2018 and as Chief Justice Maureen O'Connor was in 2022. However, a judge who reaches the age of 70 after being elected is not prevented from completing her or his term in office.

The governor of Ohio may appoint a justice to the court when there is a vacancy.

Until June 2021, judicial elections were non-partisan. This meant that parties nominated candidates in primary elections, but party designations for the candidates were not permitted on the general election ballot. Candidates and judges are also restricted in making public political statements. In response to the 2020 election of Democrat Jennifer Brunner, Ohio Republicans passed a law making general elections partisan, one of seven states to elect justices with party labels on the ballot. The Ohio Judicial Conference and Ohio Courts of Appeals Judges opposed the change, saying the judiciary should be independent of parties.

From the seating of Robert R. Cupp in 2007 to replace Democrat Alice Robie Resnick until the 2010 appointment of Eric Brown as chief justice, the court consisted entirely of Republicans who had been nominated through the primary process and won the general election, or who were appointed to an open seat by a Republican governor. This occurred once again in 2018 when Republican Mary DeGenaro was appointed to fill the seat vacated by the lone Democrat on the court, Bill O'Neill. Democrats once again joined the court in 2019 with the election of Michael Donnelly and Melody Stewart in November 2018. In the court's history, there have been four instances where the female justices have outnumbered the male justices. The first occurred from January to May 2003, the second time occurred in 2005 and 2006, the third time occurred between January 2011 and January 2017, and the fourth time occurred between January 2018 and December 2022.

Name	Born	Start	Term ends	Mandatory retirement (Note: Justices are barred from running for additional terms after the age of 70.)	Party	Law school
Sharon L. Kennedy, Chief Justice	March 15, 1962 (age 64)	December 7, 2012 (Note: Took office as Chief Justice on January 1, 2023 after being elected in a partisan election.)	December 31, 2028	2034	Republican	Cincinnati
Patrick F. Fischer	December 30, 1957 (age 68)	January 1, 2017	December 31, 2028	2028	Republican	Harvard
Pat DeWine	February 22, 1968 (age 58)	January 2, 2017	January 1, 2029	2040	Republican	Michigan
Jennifer Brunner	February 5, 1957 (age 69)	January 2, 2021	January 1, 2033	2032	Democratic	Capital
Joe Deters	April 4, 1957 (age 69)	January 7, 2023 (Note: Initially appointed to the court by Governor Mike DeWine (R) for a term ending on December 10, 2024. Subsequently elected to a full 6-year term in 2024, beginning on January 2, 2025.)	January 1, 2031	2030	Republican	Cincinnati
Daniel R. Hawkins	1975 (age 50–51)	December 10, 2024	December 31, 2026	2050	Republican	Ohio State
Megan E. Shanahan	1972 (age 53–54)	January 1, 2025	December 31, 2030	2042	Republican	Cincinnati

=== Elected justices ===
Vacator	Reason	Start	Successor
Daniel R. Hawkins	Defeated	January 1, 2027	Marilyn Zayas

=== Compensation ===
As of 2025, the chief justice receives $203,575 per year and associate justices $191,092 per year.

== See also ==
- Ohio Supreme Court elections
- List of Ohio politicians
- List of Ohio politicians by state office
- Ohio District Courts of Appeals
