= National Robotics Challenge =

Annual robotics competition

The National Robotics Challenge is an annual robotics competition in the United States, established in 1986, in which robot contestants compete in one or more of a number of different disciplines.

== History ==
The National Robotics Challenge was originally known as the Society of Manufacturing Engineers Robotic Technology and Engineering Challenge (SME-RTEC). SME-RTEC was established in 1986, making it the first and longest running robotics contest in the United States, by Tom Meravi, Associate Professor from Northern Michigan University and James Hannemann, co-chairman of the event. The first edition of the competition had two work cells and two pick-and-place competitions, and over the next 15 years, Meravi and Hannemann oversaw the growth of the competition to 17 different contests by 2002. Hannemann died in July 2001, after which the SME announced, at the 2003 awards ceremony in Rochester, New York, that it would discontinue its sponsorship of the event.

Following this announcement, three educators from Marion, Ohio: Ed Goodwin, Ritch Ramey, and Tad Douce, took over the organization of the competition. The 2004 event was held at the Veterans Memorial Coliseum in Marion, with over 200 students participating from several states. The 2005 event grew in both participants and sponsors, and concluded with the addition of 2005 judge Brad Pottkotter, a teacher at Ridgedale High School, as a fourth committee member.

The 2006 National Robotics Challenge included 300 students from five middle schools, 27 high schools, and four post-secondary schools from Ohio, Indiana, Virginia, Pennsylvania, Connecticut, South Carolina, Michigan and New York, with over 180 robots competing in 11 different contest categories. In 2008, Mark Robinson of Marion Harding High School was added to the organizing committee.

The three-day event in 2009 included college students participating from Iowa, Arkansas, New York, Indiana, Michigan and Ohio. Ohio Northern University contributed an automated Ice Cream Sundae machine, which made over 1,000 sundaes for those present. That year saw the largest field of entries to date, and the addition of: the Math Machine challenge, which involved middle school and high school teams competing to complete a maze using Ti-83/84 programmable calculators; the Vex Robotics regional contest; and the AgBot contests for elementary and middle school students. The event also included booths and displays from various robotic industry companies, and various other robotics-related attractions.
