= Ozias Bowen =

American judge

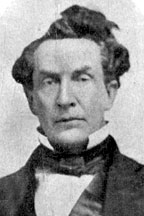

Associate Justice of the Ohio Supreme Court
- In office May 1856 – February 1858
- Appointed by: Salmon P. Chase
- Preceded by: Charles Cleveland Convers
- Succeeded by: Milton Sutliff

Personal details
- Born: July 21, 1805 Augusta, New York, U.S.
- Died: September 26, 1871 (aged 66) Marion, Ohio, U.S.
- Party: Republican
- Other political affiliations: Whig
- Spouses: Lydia Baker; Eliza M. McIntire; Emmalie M. Wilson
- Children: ten

Ozias Bowen (July 21, 1805 – September 26, 1871) was a Republican politician in the U.S. State of Ohio who was an Ohio Supreme Court Judge 1856–1858.

== Biography ==
Bowen was born at Augusta, Oneida County, New York. He lived in Fredonia, New York, until age 15, when he was moved to Ashtabula County, Ohio. He studied law in Canton, Ohio, was admitted to the bar there, and began practice at Marion, Ohio.

Bowen taught school and was a merchant as well as a lawyer. On February 7, 1838, the Legislature elected him Presiding Judge of the Second Judicial Circuit for seven years, to which he was re-elected. In this capacity, Judge Bowen was most famous for delivering a decision on August 27, 1839, that freed a fugitive slave named Bill Mitchell, sparking a battle between proslavery and anti-slavery forces known as The Marion Riot.

In 1856, Charles Cleveland Convers resigned from the Ohio Supreme Court due to poor health. Governor Chase appointed Bowen to the judgeship. He was elected later that year with a plurality in a three-way race over Democrat Carrington W. Seal and American Party nominee Samuel Brush to the remainder of the term.

He was a presidential elector for Lincoln/Johnson in 1864. He died September 26, 1871, at Marion Ohio.

== Personal life ==
Bowen's Marion, Ohio residence is owned by the Marion County Historical Association and operates it as the Stengel-True Museum.

Bowen married Lydia Baker, daughter of Eber Baker on February 17, 1833, in Marion. She died shortly after the birth of her eighth child. Bowen married Eliza M. McIntire on March 15, 1848, in Marion. She had two children. Following Eliza's death, he later married Emmalie M. Wilson on April 20, 1871, in Branch, Michigan. They had no children.

Judge Bowen's second home in Marion, Ohio is owned by the Marion County Historical Association. Bowen's first home in Marion on East Center Street is the oldest standing house on its original foundation in the city of Marion.

== Notes ==
Legal offices
Preceded by Charles Cleveland Convers	Associate Justice of the Ohio Supreme Court; 1856–1858	Succeeded by Milton Sutliff
