= Marion Popcorn Festival =

Food festival in Marion, Ohio, United States

- Status: active
- Genre: festivals
- Frequency: Annually, First weekend after Labor Day
- Location: Marion, Ohio
- Coordinates: 40°35′12″N 83°7′35″W
- Country: US
- Years active: 44–45
- Inaugurated: 1981
- Website: www.popcornfestival.com

The Marion Popcorn Festival is held every year in downtown Marion, Ohio, United States. The festival was established in 1981 and is held annually during the first weekend after Labor Day in September. Marion was once an epicenter of popcorn manufacturing, made by such companies as Wyandot Snacks and Orville Redenbacher's (currently made by ConAgra). Wyandot Snacks was once the largest exporter of popcorn in the United States, and Cracker Jack was manufactured in Marion for almost a decade. In 1982, the second year of the festival, Wyandot Snacks presented a 40 foot long bag of popcorn, which they submitted to the Guinness Book of World Records for consideration as the largest bag of popcorn in the world.

Festival organizers schedule nationally known acts like Gloria Estefan, REO Speedwagon, Styx, Lorrie Morgan, The Neville Brothers, and native son Huey Lewis and the News to perform at the festival. It is said to be the biggest popcorn festival in the world, attracting crowds of over 250,000.

In 2004, the Travel Channel came to the festival and recorded parts of the festival as part of Taste of America with Mark DeCarlo.

In 2016 Kellie Pickler and Skid Row performed. In 2017 The Georgia Satellites and the Gin Blossoms performed.

In 2019 Frankie Ballard and Hinder performed.

The 2020 Festival was cancelled due to the COVID-19 pandemic.
