= Beckel =

Beckel is a surname. Notable people with this surname include:

- Bob Beckel (1948–2022), American political analyst
- Graham Beckel (born 1949), American actor
- James A. Beckel Jr. (born 1948), American contemporary composer
- Nadine Beckel (born 1977), German shot putter
- Robert D. Beckel (born 1937), United States Air Force general
- Roei Beckel (born 1987), former Israeli footballer
- William Edwin Beckel (1926–2018), Canadian academic
