= Black Bill =

Black Bill may refer to:

- Black-billed (disambiguation)
- Eladio Valdes, Cuban boxer
- Bill Anderson, a Black man involved in the 1839 Marion riot
