= Edmund Cooke =

Edmund Cooke may refer to:

- Edmund Cooke (pirate) (fl. 1673–1683), English pirate and buccaneer
- Edmund F. Cooke (1885–1967), U.S. Representative from New York
- Edmund Vance Cooke (1866–1932), poet
- Ted Cooke-Yarborough (Edmund Cooke-Yarborough, 1918–2013), early computer pioneer
