= Senator Converse =

Senator Converse may refer to:

- George L. Converse (1827–1897), Ohio State Senate
- Julius Converse (1798–1885), Vermont State Senate

== See also ==
- Charles Cleveland Convers (1810–1860), Ohio State Senate
