= Anna de La Grange =

French opera singer

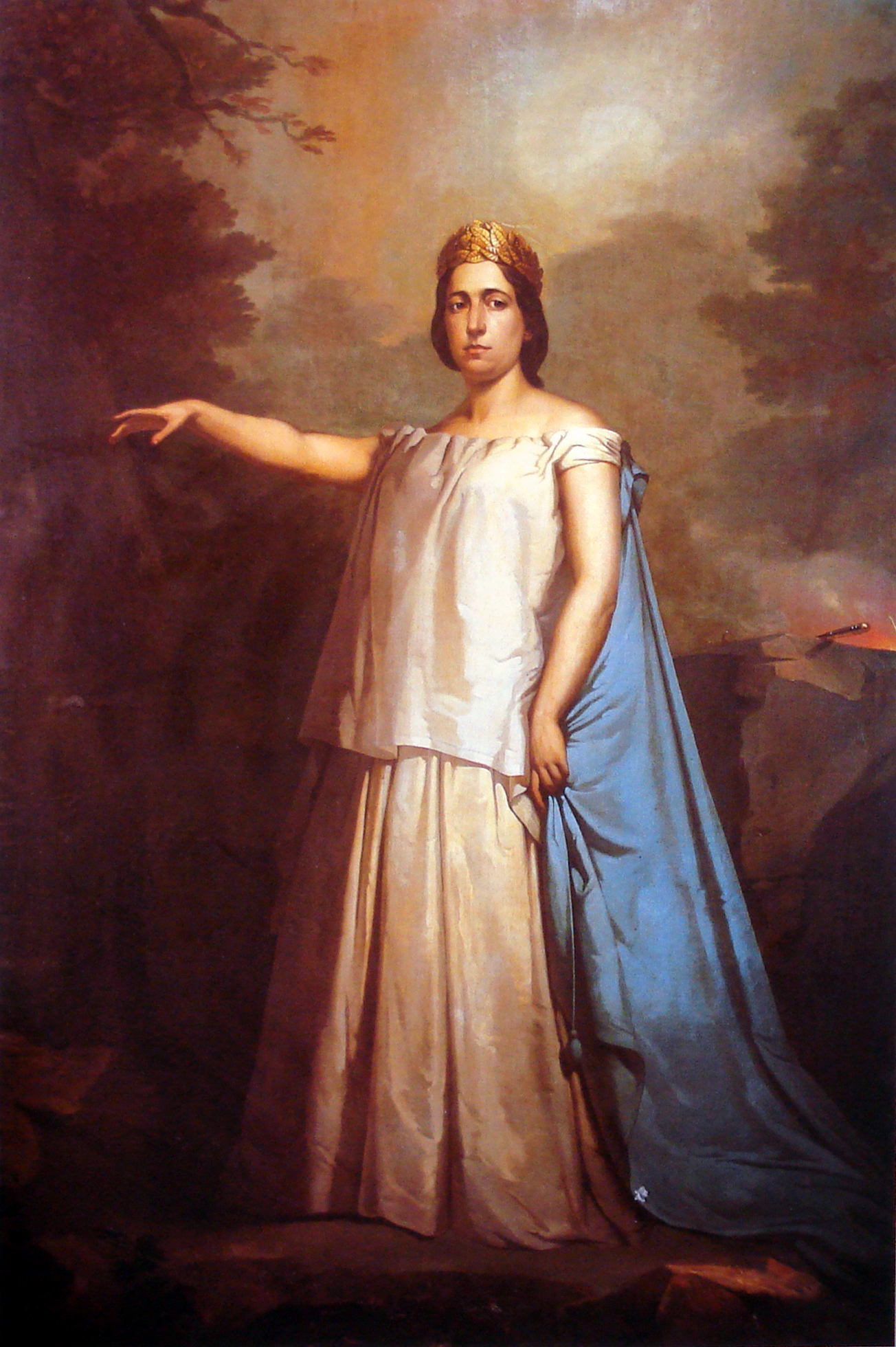
- Anna de La Grange as Norma
- Born: 24 July 1825; Paris, France
- Died: 23 April 1905 (aged 79); Paris, France
- Other name: Anna de La Grange de Stankowitch
- Occupations: Opera singer and composer
- Spouse: Count of Stankowitch

Anna de La Grange de Stankowitch (1825–1905) was a French coloratura soprano. She was one of the most noted opera singers of the nineteenth century, a protégée of Rossini and Meyerbeer, and played Violetta in the American premiere of Verdi's La Traviata in New York in 1856. She was also a composer in her own right. In her later life she taught singing in Paris where one of her students was American soprano Genevra Johnstone-Bishop.
