= Milton Sutliff =

American judge

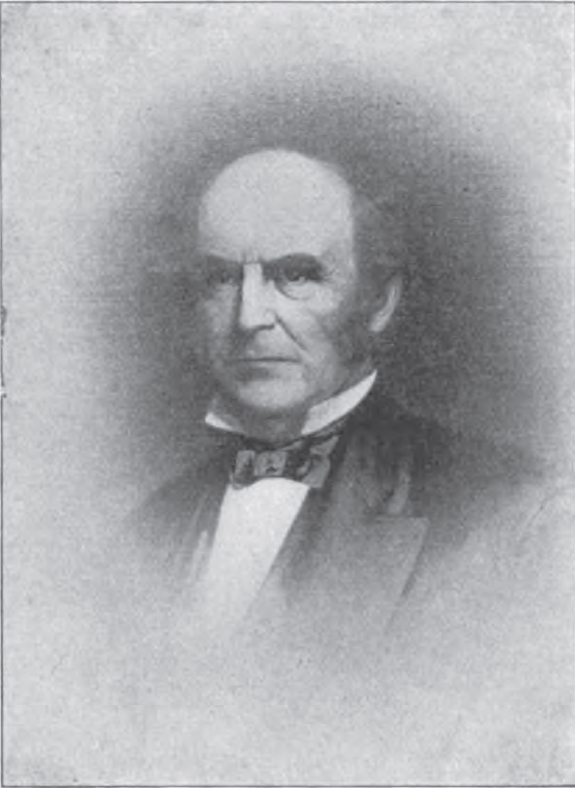

Justice of the Ohio Supreme Court
- In office February 9, 1858 – February 9, 1863
- Preceded by: Ozias Bowen
- Succeeded by: Rufus P. Ranney

Personal details
- Born: October 16, 1806 Trumbull County, Ohio, U.S.
- Died: April 24, 1878 (aged 71) Warren, Ohio, U.S.
- Resting place: Oakwood Cemetery
- Party: Free Soil; Republican
- Education: Western Reserve College

Milton Sutliff (October 6 or 16, 1806 – April 24, 1878) was a Republican politician in the U.S. State of Ohio who was a member of the Ohio Senate for one year and an Ohio Supreme Court Judge from 1858 to 1863.

== Biography ==
Milton Sutliff was born in Warren, Ohio; other sources that give his birthplace as Vernon refer to Vernon Township. He was the fifth of seven children born to Samuel Sutliff (1765–1840) and Ruth (Granger) Sutliff (1770–1843), a cousin of Gideon Granger. The town of Sutliff, Iowa was named after his elder brother Allen C. Sutliff (1796–1873).

As a young adult, he traveled through the South, and became an Abolitionist. He returned to Warren in 1830 and graduated from Western Reserve College in 1834. That year he also founded the Anti-Slavery Society of the Western Reserve, after being instrumental in founding the National Anti-Slavery Society in 1833 in Philadelphia. He also was admitted to the bar in 1834. In 1839 he formed a partnership with Henry W. King.

In 1849, as a Freesoiler, Sutliff was elected to represent Trumbull and Geauga counties in the Ohio Senate for the 49th General Assembly.

In 1857, Sutliff was nominated by the Republican Party for Judge of the Ohio Supreme Court, and defeated Democrat Henry C. Whitman in the general election. He was not re-nominated in 1862. In 1872, Sutliff was nominated by the Democrats for United States Representative from Ohio's 19th congressional district, but lost to James A. Garfield.

Sutliff died of apoplexy during a violent storm in Warren. He is buried at Oakwood Cemetery in the family plot. His estate, valued at $500,000, left $10,000 in property to the city of Warren to help establish a library. The Warren Public Library was dedicated February 3, 1906, including its Sutliff lecture room.

== Notes ==
Legal offices
Preceded by Ozias Bowen	Associate Justice of the Ohio Supreme Court; 1858–1863	Succeeded by Rufus P. Ranney
Ohio Senate
Preceded by John F. Beaver	Senator from Trumbull and Geauga Counties; 1850–1851	Succeeded by John I. Todd
