= Marion City School District =

School district in the United States

Coordinates: 40°35′42″N 83°5′30″W

Location
- Marion, Ohio; United States

District information
- Type: Public School District

Students and staff
- Students: 4,315

Other information
- Website: https://www.marioncityschools.org/

Marion City School District is a public school district serving students in the city of Marion, Ohio, United States. The school district enrolls 4,315 students as of October 2017.

== History ==
The original high school opened in 1893 under the name Marion High School. In 1915, a second Marion High School opened, later to be renamed Harding High School in 1920. The third high school, which currently houses Grant Middle School, opened in 1953. The first two schools have since been demolished with the exception of the gymnasium of the second school, which now operates as a community center.

In the early 2000s, many of the district buildings were in need of renovations, as some of the buildings were nearly 100 years old. With the assistance of state funds offered for the replacement or upgrade of older school facilities, a new high school and three identical new elementary school buildings were erected. The previous high school underwent renovations, including the addition of a library wing and an additional cafeteria, and became Grant Middle School. Three additional buildings; Fair Park Elementary School, George Washington Elementary School, and Indian Mound Elementary School; were updated as well. These buildings now house Hayes Elementary School, George Washington Elementary School, and Harrison Elementary School respectively.

In 2024 Brian Murphy became the superintendent; he was a graduate of Harding High.

== Schools ==
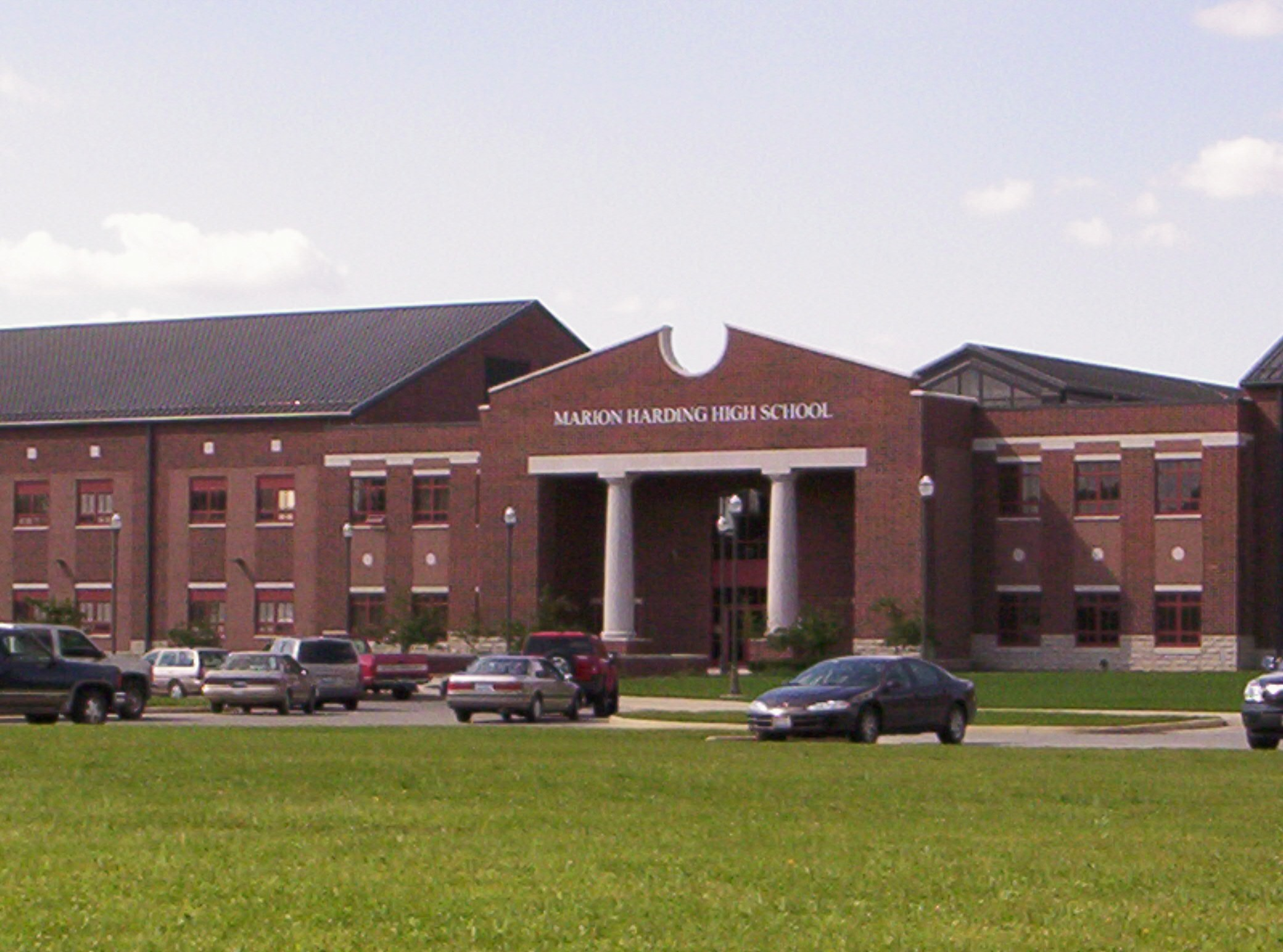
Marion Harding High School

=== Elementary schools ===
- Garfield Elementary School
- Harrison Elementary School
- Hayes Elementary School
- McKinley Elementary School
- Taft Elementary School
- George Washington Elementary School

=== Middle schools ===
- Grant Middle School

=== High schools ===
- Marion Harding High School

=== Alternative Schools ===
- Mary Ellen Withrow Middle School
- Mary Ellen Withrow High School
- Tri Rivers Career Center
