= Marie Litta =

American opera singer (1856–1883)

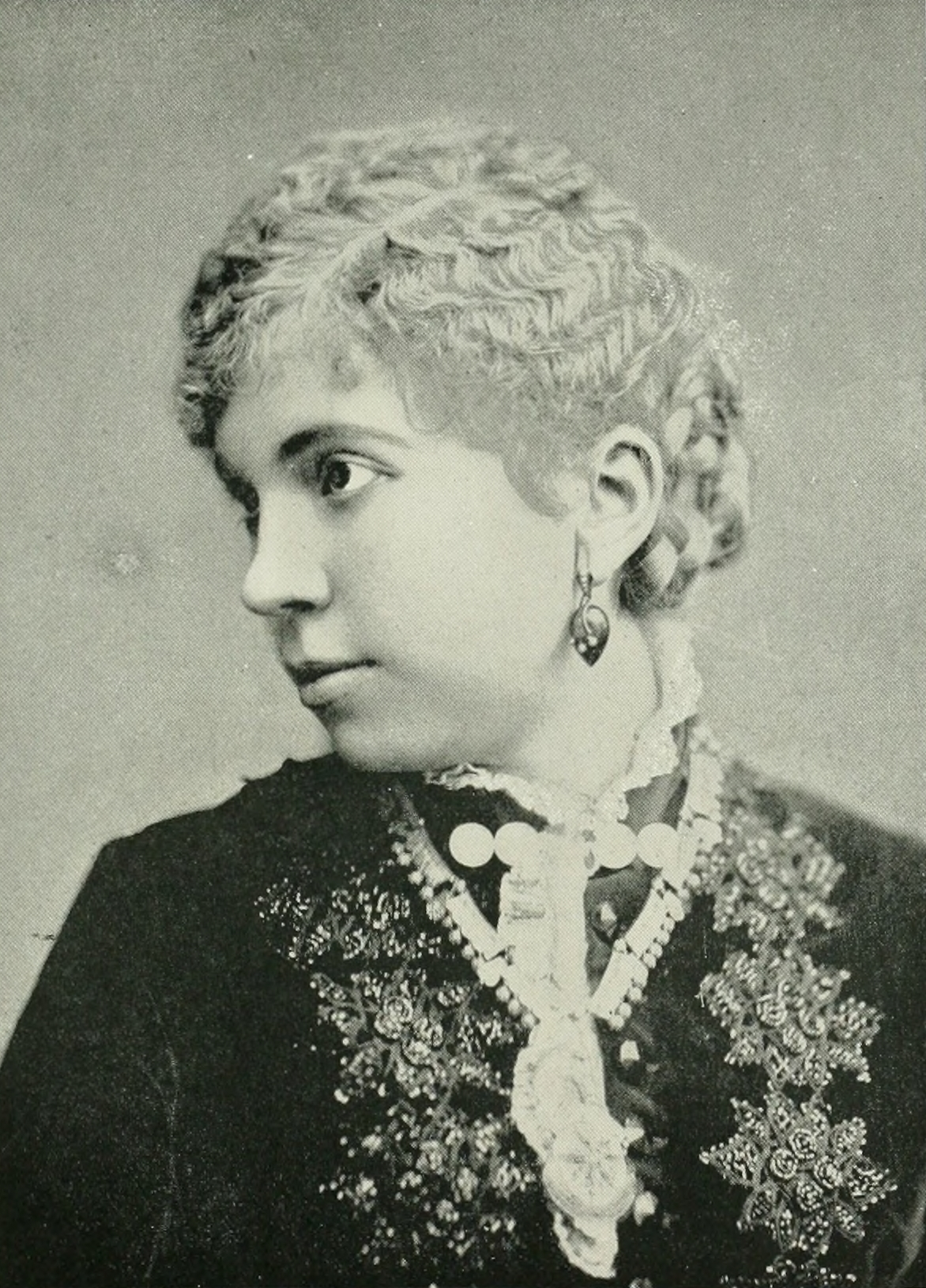
- Born: Marie Eugenia von Elsner; June 1, 1856; Bloomington, Illinois, U.S.
- Died: July 7, 1883 (aged 27); Escanaba, Michigan, U.S.
- Occupation: Operatic soprano
- Organizations: Théâtre des Italiens; Max Strakosch Opera Company

Marie Eugenia von Elsner (June 1, 1856 – July 7, 1883; pronounced Maria), known by her stage name Marie Litta, was an American soprano opera singer.

Trained to sing from an early age by her father, she traveled with him around the country to perform. She later studied with John Underner in Cleveland, Ohio. With the support of a patron, she studied further in Europe, with Pauline Viardot among others. Her debut performance in Paris was the title role of Donizetti's Lucia di Lammermoor—a role that remained a signature of hers while touring the United States with an opera company for years. In 1880, she formed her own troupe, and died three years later.

== Early life ==
Marie Eugenia von Elsner was born on June 1, 1856, in Bloomington, Illinois, to Hugo von Elsner (a professor of music) and mother Amanda Dimmitt (whose family were early settlers of Illinois). After her musical skill was noticed by those around her, her father began to train her to become a leading singer. At the age of 5, she sang "The Last Rose of Summer" to Union soldiers in Springfield; this was her first public performance. By the time she was 14, she began traveling with her father to several cities in Illinois and beyond to perform. One city she performed in was Cleveland, and it was there she began to study under John Underner. Her Cleveland studies were financially supported by a patron of the arts, and they funded her travel to Europe for further study.

Von Elsner went to Europe, mostly France, in October 1874. There, she studied under composer Pauline Viardot and the wealthy Comtesse de Trobriand, who offered her a space to perform.

== Career ==
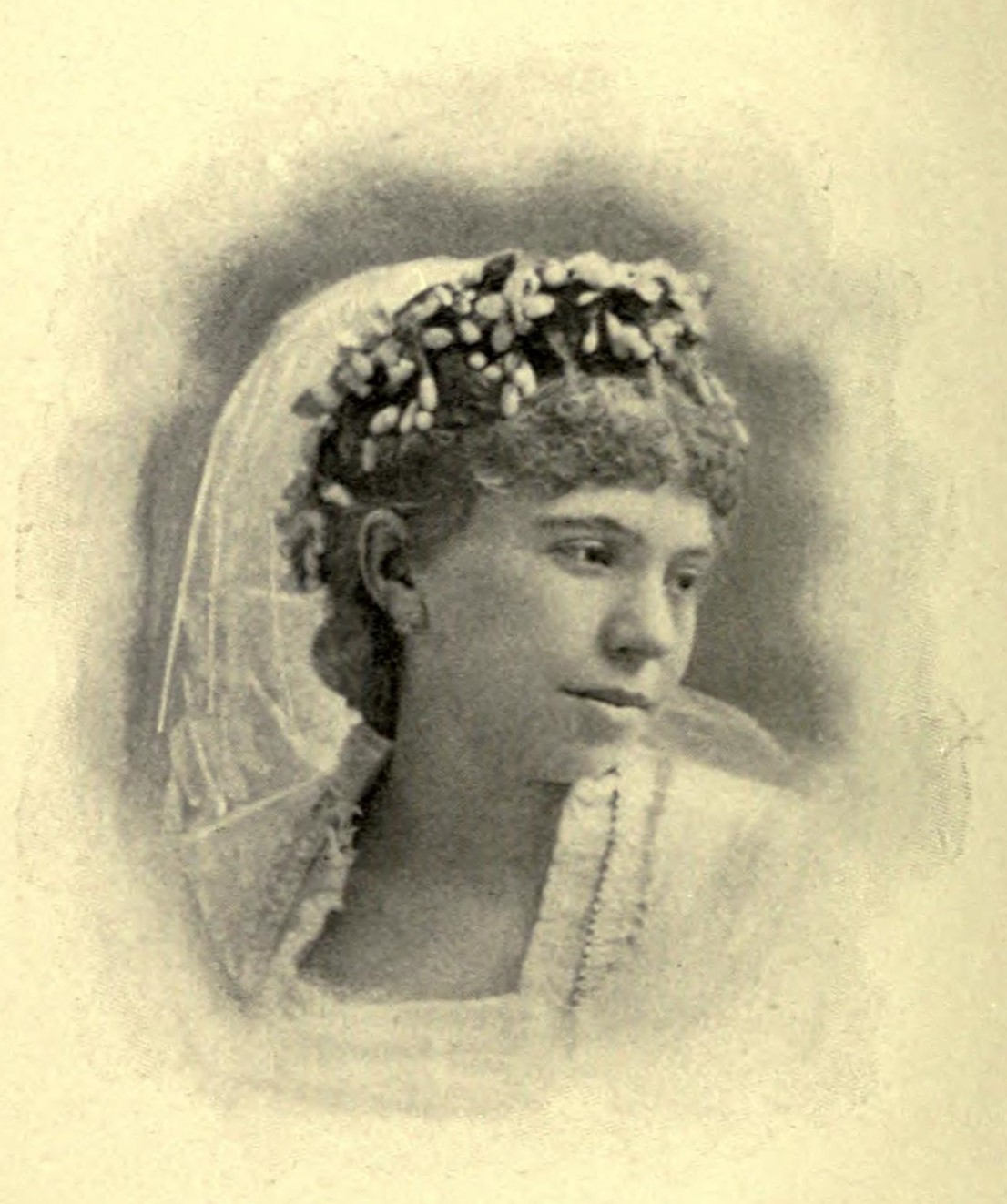
A sketch of Litta

Her first career performance was in Paris at the Théâtre des Italiens for Lucia di Lammermoor; it was there she took the Italian stage name of Marie Litta. She played the role of its titular character, Lucia, a character whose final scenes are highly chaotic, elaborate, and demanding. Reviews were positive, with the Parisian opera community lauding her performance.

After about four years in Europe and after signing a deal with the Max Strakosch Opera Company, she returned to the United States and performed for them. The terms of this contract were unfavorable for her, and conflicted with an earlier contract she had signed with Underner. Her first performance was at McVicker's Theatre in Chicago in 1878, performing Lucia di Lammermoor again. By this time, Lucia di Lammermoor had become a favorite of hers, perhaps because it showed the range of her voice. As a singer of the Strakosch company, she traveled around the United States and Canada to perform; her tour included the cities of Boston, San Francisco, Halifax, and New York City. She continued to stage (among other operas) Lucia di Lammermoor, and she performed alongside Charles R. Adams, Annie Louise Cary, and Clara Louise Kellogg.

In 1880, about two years into her return, she left Strakosch's company and formed her own, which included pianist Nellie Bangs Skelton. Among the performances she and her crew put on was the program "Carnival of Venice" by Julius Benedict. She was also involved in the troupe of Giovanni Tagliapietra from 1880 to 1881. The year she left, she became involved in a lawsuit against him. Despite Litta's fame and personal success, the troupe was unsuccessful, and Tagliapietra had gone into debt, failing to pay his fellow performers. The amount he owed Litta was some $1200 at the time.

== Death ==
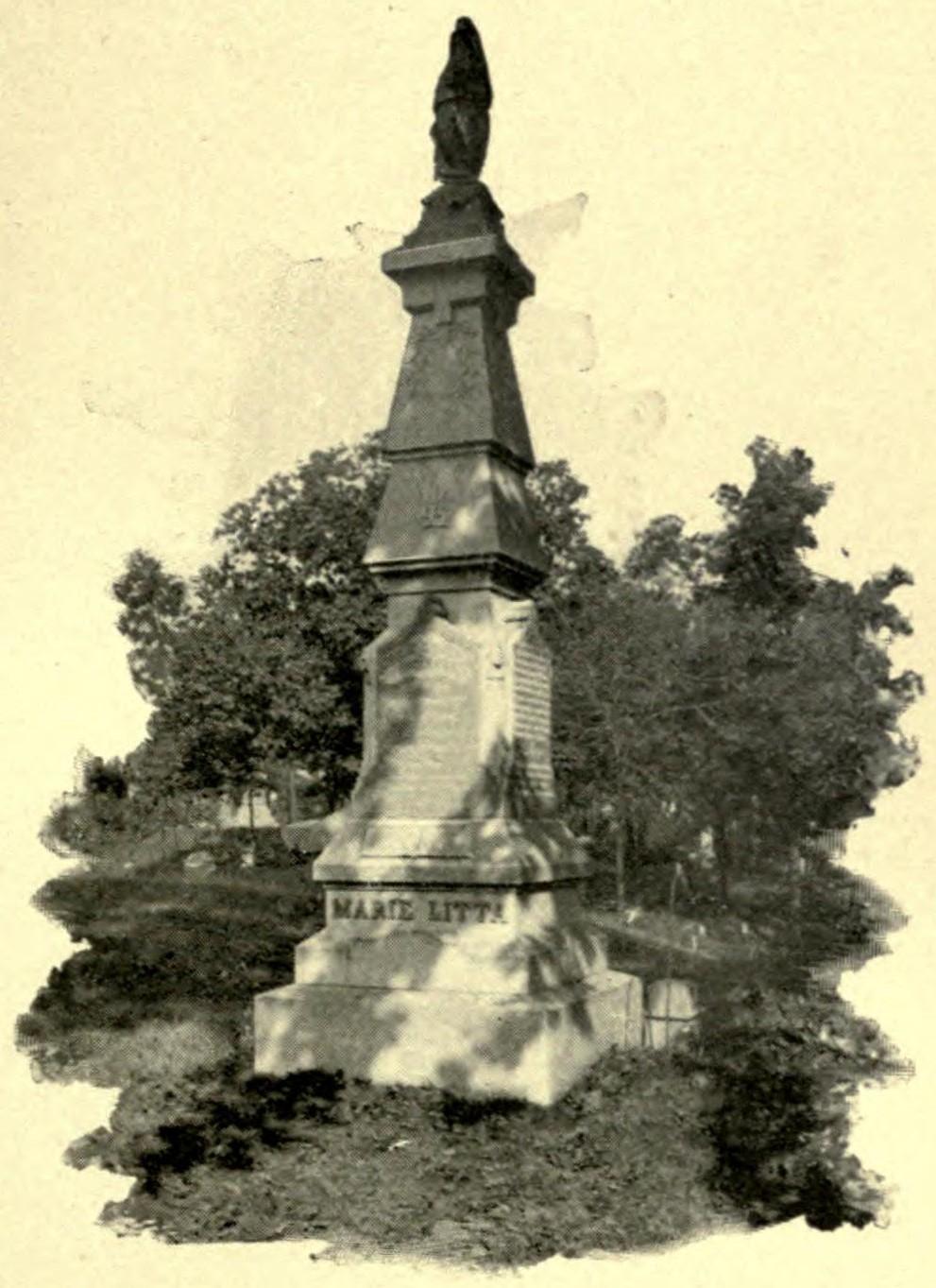
A sketch of her monument

In May 1883, she became violently ill while singing to miners of the Great Lakes town of Escanaba, Michigan. Litta died on July 7, 1883, at the age of 27 in Bloomington; her death certificate labeled her cause of death as meningitis, exacerbated by exertion. Her funeral was attended by some 10,000 people.

A monument in her honor was erected on July 4, 1885. The monument's service was attended by David Davis, then a United States senator from Illinois, who offered a tribute: "to Litta the artist ... whose eminence is our local legacy".
