= Kate Vanderpoel =

American song composer

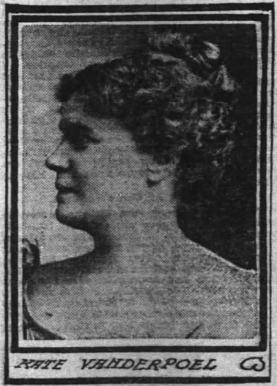

Cornelia Townsend (born 11 August 1851) was an American song composer who published most of her music under the name Kate Vanderpoel.

== Biography ==
Townsend was born in Cleveland, Ohio, to Horace Gilbert and Eliza Ann Thornton Townsend, one of nine children. Her siblings included her twin brother George who built the Kansas City, Clay County & St. Joseph Railway, and her brother Edward, a writer, journalist, and U.S. Congressman. She studied with Achille Errani in New York. In 1891 she moved to Chicago, Illinois and lived on Calumet Ave. By 1912 she lived in Milwaukee (as did her sister Anna); several of her publications have ended up in Milwaukee Public Library's Historical Sheet Music Collection.

In 1896, the Republican National Committee sponsored the publication of 20,000 copies of three of Townsend's self-published songs: "Flag Song", "That Man from O-Hi-O" about President William McKinley, and "On To Victory".

Her music was published by S. Brainard Sons, Orpheus Publishing Company, Clayton F. Summy Company, and herself. She took a particular interest in the frontispiece design of her published music, going so far as to commission a cover for her Florimella Waltz from J. C. Lyndecker. Several of her songs were transcribed for organ, some made it into Clarence Eddy's repertoire. Several of her compositions were also transcribed and recorded for some of the earliest player pianos and organs for the Aeolian Company, Wilcox & White Company, and Melvin Clark Piano Company

== Compositions ==
Her works include:

=== Opera ===
- Peronella (1893), libretto by Mrs. O. L. Fox
- The Colonel (1912), light opera in three acts

=== Vocal ===
- Book of Songs published in 1911 by Orpheus which included:
  - Asleep, Adream, Awake (1898?), lyrics by Edmund Vance Cooke. Transcriptions for organ (made by Henry S. Sawyer) and solo piano (made by Nellie Bangs Skelton) were published in her lifetime.
  - La Miniature (1898), lyrics by Ancella Fox, dedicated either to soprano Genevra Johnstone-Bishop or Amelia Küssner. A transcription for organ was made by Albert F. McCarrell.
  - Darling, Darling (1904), lyrics by Katrina Trask, epigraph by Elizabeth K. Reynolds
  - Golden Poppies (1897), lyrics by Ancella Fox, dedicated to soprano Genevra Johnstone Bishop
  - When Apple Blossoms Give Their Fragrance Rare (1891), lyrics by Jane Thornton
  - Where Love Is (1894), lyrics by Cornelia Townsend (copyright originally held by Clayton F. Summy)
  - When Love Is Young (1911), lyrics by Elizabeth K. Reynolds
  - Eyes of Blue (1911), lyrics by Elizabeth K. Reynolds
  - Little Boy Blue (1911), lyrics by Eugene Field
  - Grandmother's Song (1911), lyrics by Edmund Vance Cooke
  - Mother's Picture (1911), lyrics by Joseph W. Humphries
- The following three songs commissioned by the 1896 Republican National Convention, where Ohioan William McKinley secured the nomination for president:
  - Flag Song, lyrics by John Swinton
  - That Man from O-Hi-O dedicated to William McKinley
  - On To Victory
- Carminella Waltz
- Chimmie Fadden of de Bow'ry, lyrics by her brother Edward Townsend. Henry S. Sawyer also made an arrangement of this song. Dan W. Quinn made an early 1896 phonograph recording of this song for Columbia.
- Cradle Song
- Either
- Elinore
- Entrée de cortège. This work was also arranged for band by George D. Barnard, and transcribed for organ by Harrison M. Wild (transcription dedicated to Clarence Dickinson.
- Florimella Waltz
- Go Sleep, My Honey (1895) (words by Edward D. Barker)
- Major Max
- Memory (lyrics by Vanderpoel)
- My Dan (lyrics by Vanderpoel)
- Philomella Waltz (transcription from her opera Peronella)
- Please Smile
- Supplication. This song was transcribed for organ by John A. West, transcription dedicated to Clarence Eddy.

By 1901, Florimella Waltz, Philomella Waltz, Golden Poppies, La Miniature, and Supplication were all recorded for Aeolian piano rolls. Several years later, these same five works were available for Wilcox & White and Melvin Clark reproducing pianos and organs.

== External Sites ==
Scores by Vanderpoel at the New York Public Library Digital Collections
