= Genevra Johnstone-Bishop =

Genevra Johnstone-Bishop

Genevra Johnstone-Bishop (November 12, 1857 – December 1, 1923) was an American soprano and voice teacher.

== Biography ==
The daughter of Mr. and Mrs. J. C. Johnstone, Genevra Johnstone was born in Marion, Ohio on November 12, 1857. She was the great-granddaughter of Marion's founder, Eber Baker. Her father was a lawyer and judge. In June 1890 she married the Chicago physician Rufus W. Bishop.

Johnstone-Bishop studied singing in Paris with soprano Anna de La Grange in Paris and in London tenor William Shakespeare, Alberto Randegger, and Frederick Walker. In her early career she was a church vocalist at the Congregational Church in Toledo. In 1880s she established herself as a concert and church soprano in Chicago. She sang at the Bayreuth Festival in 1892. She was well known throughout the United States as a concert soprano; particularly in oratorios. She was a frequent performer with the Chicago Symphony Orchestra, singing with the orchestra both in the city at events like the World's Columbian Exposition in 1893 and on multiple national tours.

Composer Kate Vanderpoel dedicated her song "La Miniature" (1898) to Johnstone-Bishop. By 1913 she was teaching singing concurrently at Carroll College (CC) in Wisconsin and the Sherwood School of Music in Chicago. She was dean of the voice department at CC until leaving in 1919. By 1917 she was also teaching voice at the Chicago Musical College. In 1919-1920 Johnstone-Bishop was head of the voice department at the Kenosha Grand Conservatory in Wisconsin. In 1921 she joined the voice faculty of the Anaheim Conservatory of Music in California.

In the early 1920s she served as a musical advisor to the White House during the presidency of Warren G. Harding. She had a lifelong friendship with Florence Harding whom she knew from her childhood in Marion.

Genevra Johnstone-Bishop died in Los Angeles, California on December 1, 1923.
