= Nellie Bangs Skelton =

American composer, pianist, singer and vocal coach

Cornelia (“Nellie”) Pomeroy Bangs Skelton DePue (August 8, 1855 - November 23, 1911) was an American composer, pianist, singer and vocal coach who toured the United States as a pianist. She published and performed as Nellie Bangs Skelton.

Skelton was born in Lacon, Illinois, to Harriet Cornelia Pomeroy and Mark Bangs, a judge. She began studying piano at age seven, and published her first composition at age eleven. She married John Skelton and later married Elmer DePue, but eventually divorced both of them. She studied piano in Chicago with Eugenie de Roode Rice.

Skelton toured the United States as a pianist with the Marie Litta Company for two years in the early 1880s, then joined the Slayton Concert Company as a pianist. By 1896, she had formed her own concert company with her husband Elmer De Pue, a tenor. She also taught piano at the Armour Institute and at the Soper School of Oratory, both in Chicago, and toured for the International Young People’s Lecture Bureau as a pianist.

Skelton’s music was published by Clayton F. Summy and Theodore Presser.

== Piano ==
- First Brigade March
- Gavotte in E minor
- Ripple
- Three Ballet Dances
- Trifler

== Vocal ==
- “Asleep, Adream Awake Serenade” (text by Edmund Vance Cooke; music by Kate Vanderpoel; piano transcription by Nellie Bangs Skelton)
- “I’m a Merry Little Vivandiere” (text by Fanchon H. Thompson)
