= Marion Harding High School (Ohio) =

Location
- 1500 Harding Hwy E Marion, Ohio; United States; 40°35′35″N 83°05′27″W

Information
- Type: Public high school
- Opened: 1953 (original building); 2003 (new building)
- School district: Marion City School District
- Principal: Todd Schneider
- Teaching staff: 69.00 (FTE)
- Grades: 9–12
- Enrollment: 916 (2024-2025)
- Student to teacher ratio: 13.28
- Colors: Red & black
- Athletics conference: Mid-Ohio Athletic Conference (MOAC)
- Team name: The Presidents (Prexies)
- Website: www.marioncityschools.org
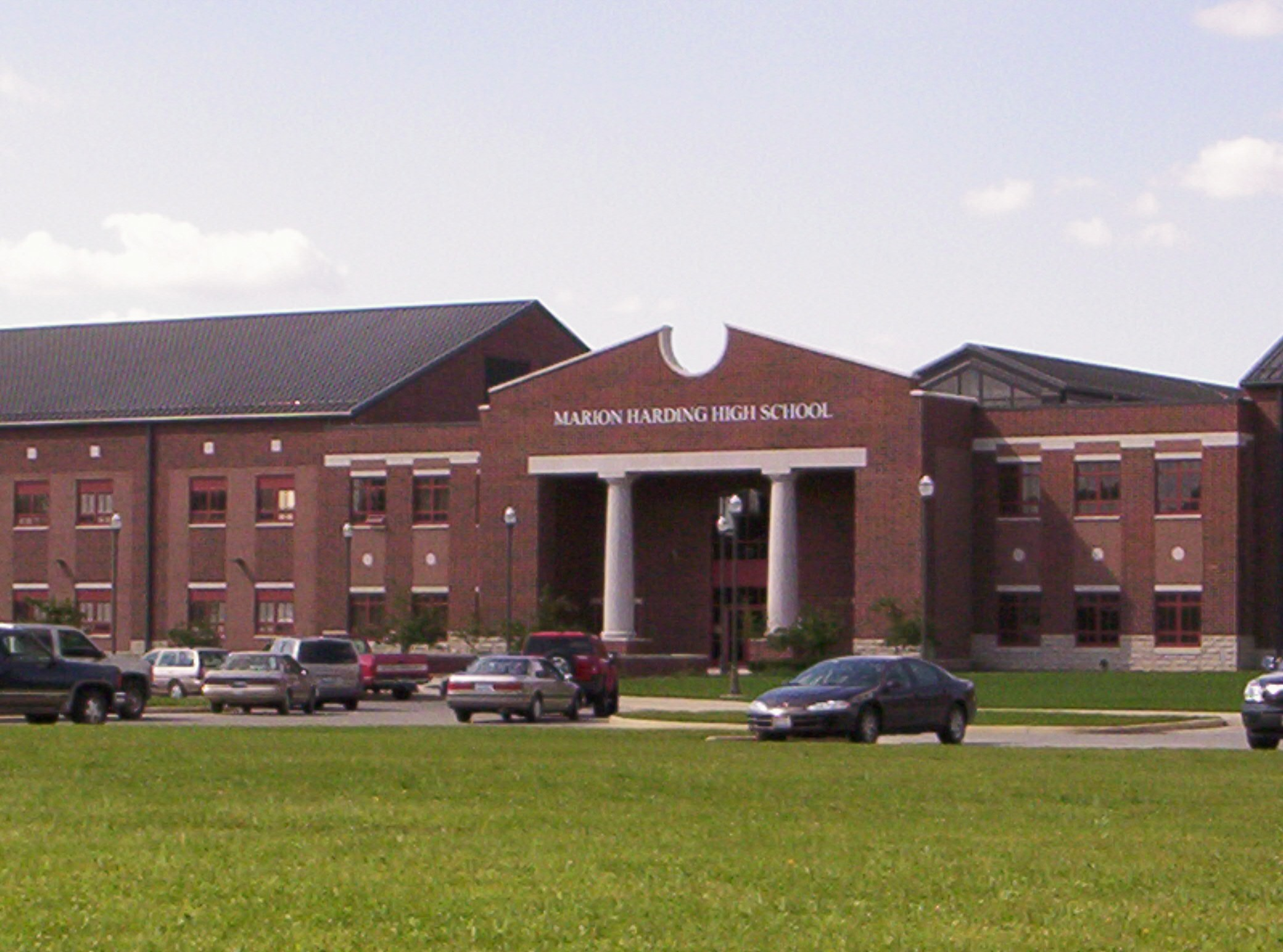
- Marion Harding High School

Marion Harding High School is a public high school in Marion, Ohio. Opened in 1893 under the name Marion High School, it received its current name in 1920. It is the only high school in the Marion City School District. The school mascot is the Presidents (often shortened to Prexies) and is symbolized by an eagle named Warren G. They are currently a member of the Mid Ohio Athletic Conference (MOAC). The enrollment was 1,050 during the 2022-23 school year.

The school was named after Marion's most famous son, Warren G. Harding. The original school site is a mere 1/2 mile from the Harding Memorial, which is one of the largest presidential memorials located outside of the Washington D.C. area. In 2003, a new high school was erected with assistance of state funds offered for the replacement and/or upgrade of older school facilities. The old building now houses Grant Middle School.

== Ohio High School Athletic Association State Championships ==
- Boys Track and Field – 1983
- Boys Cross Country – 1952

=== Other Sports titles ===
- Boys Football - 1958 (UPI poll)

== Notable alumni ==
- Mary Ellen Withrow, Former Treasurer of The United States.
- John Courtright, Former MLB player (Cincinnati Reds)
- Norman Thomas (1884-1968), Presbyterian minister, co-founder of The National Civil Liberties Bureau, which eventually became the American Civil Liberties Union. He was also a six-time Socialist Party of America candidate for president.
- James A. Beckel, Jr. (born 1948), Composer and principle trombonist with the Indianapolis Symphony Orchestra.
- Bill Sims (1949-2019), Grammy-nominated, American Blues musician. He was featured in an episode of the PBS documentary series An American Love Story about the racism he faced as a teenager while dating his future wife, who was white.
- Bobby Floyd (1954-), Jazz keyboardist.
