= Charles Cleveland Convers =

American judge

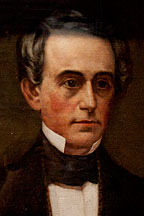

Associate Justice of the Ohio Supreme Court
- In office February 9, 1856 – April 11, 1856
- Preceded by: Allen G. Thurman
- Succeeded by: Ozias Bowen

Member of the Ohio Senate from the Muskingum County district
- In office December 3, 1849 – January 4, 1852
- Preceded by: Charles B. Goddard
- Succeeded by: William E. Finck (with Perry County)

Personal details
- Born: July 26, 1810 Zanesville, Ohio, U.S.
- Died: September 20, 1860 (aged 50) Zanesville, Ohio, U.S.
- Resting place: Woodlawn Cemetery, Zanesville, Ohio
- Party: Republican
- Other political affiliations: Whig
- Spouse: Catherine Buckingham
- Children: four
- Education: Ohio University; Harvard Law School

Charles Cleveland Convers (July 26, 1810 – September 20, 1860) was a Republican politician in the U.S. State of Ohio who was Speaker of the Ohio Senate for two years and a judge on the Ohio Supreme Court for a short time.

== Biography ==
Charles Cleveland Convers was born at Zanesville, Ohio. He graduated from Ohio University and the Harvard Law School. In 1849, he was elected to the Ohio Senate from Muskingum County, Ohio for the 48th General Assembly, which convened December 3, 1849. In January, 1850, Speaker Harrison G. Blake resigned, and Convers was chosen as his replacement. In 1850, he was re-elected, and again sat as Speaker in the 49th General Assembly.

In 1851, when Ohio Supreme Court seats first became elective, Convers was unsuccessful as a Whig nominee.

Convers was a member of the board of trustees of Ohio University from 1845 to 1849.

In 1854, Convers was elected Judge of the Court of Common Pleas. In 1855, the Republican State Convention nominated him for Judge of the Ohio Supreme Court. He defeated Democrat Robert B. Warden that year. He served only a short time before resigning due to poor health. He died September 20, 1860. Convers helped found Woodlawn Cemetery in Zanesville, where he is buried.

Convers was married to Catherine Buckingham of Zanesville on April 14, 1839. They raised four children.

== Notes ==
Legal offices
Preceded by Allen G. Thurman	Associate Justice of the Ohio Supreme Court; 1856	Succeeded by Ozias Bowen
Ohio Senate
Preceded by Charles B. Goddard	Senator from Muskingum County; 1849–1851	Succeeded by William E. Finck (with Perry County)
Preceded by Harrison G. O. Blake	Speaker of the Senate; 1850–1851	Succeeded by Position Eliminated
