= Eber Baker =

American politician

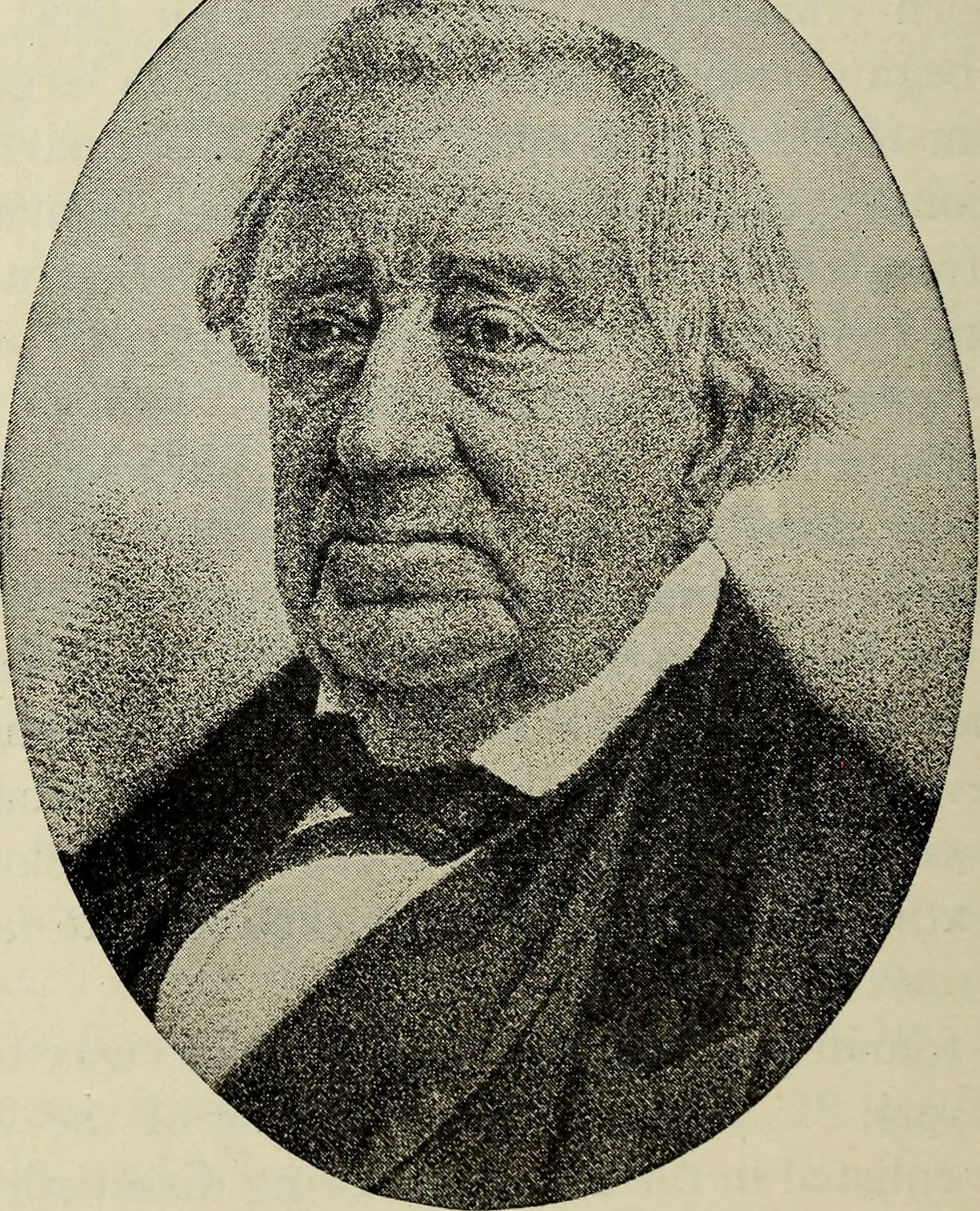
Eber Baker

Eber Baker (April 27, 1780 – October 6, 1864), Marion, Ohio can be credited as being the co-founder of Marion, Ohio. Baker was born in either Litchfield or Bowdoin, Massachusetts (both in the area that became Maine in 1820).

Baker and his first wife, Lydia Smith Baker, came to the vicinity of what is now Marion settling in two squatters' log cabins near the south side of the plat. Eber Baker was a man of means and bought 160 acres (a Land Grant) for $310 from Hezekiah Kilbourn, on April 3, 1822, as found in an affidavit where the site of Marion was to be founded. Alexander Holmes, Deputy Surveyor, was contacted by Baker, and made the first plat for Marion. Alexander Holmes drew up the plat. It was signed by himself and Eber Baker on April 3, 1822. The plat was then received and recorded in the Delaware County Land Office on April 18, 1822. Samuel Holmes, a practical surveyor, was employed by Baker to survey and stake out each lot of the village plat. Samuel was a brother of Alexander Holmes. Eber Baker became an agent (Proprietor) for selling off the village lots from the first town plat of Marion. The squatters' log cabin was about 1/4 mile north of Jacobs Well, a natural spring well that had been dug during the War of 1812 by Jacob Foos, a surveyor for General William Henry Harrison.

The town plat was named Marion after its newly formed county of the same name, which itself was named for Revolutionary War General Francis Marion. The village of Marion was then chosen as the county seat of government, beating out nearby Claridon, Ohio to the east. A local middle school was named after Baker, serving in two Buildings until a school district realignment in the 2000s.

Baker would go on to serve in the Ohio House of Representatives. He also constructed and operated the Mansion House, in downtown Marion.

His great-granddaughter was soprano Genevra Johnstone-Bishop.

== External sources ==
- Genealogy of Eber Baker compiled by Marge McGrew
- An abstract of 25 pages dated December 11, 1906, Marion, Ohio records Eber Baker's purchase of the 160 acres.
