= Wyandot Snacks =

Snack product manufacturer

Wyandot Inc.
- Company type: Private
- Industry: Food processing
- Founded: Marion, Ohio, United States (1936)
- Founders: W. Hoover Brown and Ava King Brown
- Headquarters: Marion, Ohio, United States
- Key people: Dewey Armstrong (President and Chief Executive Officer)
- Products: See Products section
- Number of employees: 333

Wyandot Snacks is a privately held and family owned American contract manufacturer of snacks and other packaged foods, headquartered in Marion, Ohio, a part of the Columbus, Ohio Combined statistical area. primarily as a contract manufacturer for domestic and international branded snack businesses, but also for foodservice customers. The company's main product lines are extruded snacks, corn & tortilla chips, and ready to eat (RTE) popcorn. Wyandot's focuses on the creation of plant-based snack products made from ancient grains such as sorghum and quinoa, pulses such as chickpeas, and flaxseed, among others.

== History ==
Wyandot Popcorn Company was founded in Wyandot County, Ohio during the Great Depression by Hoover and Ava (King) Brown. Mrs. Brown was the daughter of George W. King, one of the founders of the Marion Power Shovel Company. In 1936, as a way to diversify their family's farming income from grains and livestock, the Browns planted their first 100 acres of popcorn and entered the business of growing and selling raw popcorn. Popcorn became a popular treat in America at the time given its affordability.

In 1948 a subsidiary, Popped-Right Corn Company, was established initially to sell ready-to-eat (RTE) popcorn to movie theatres. Popped-Right, in conjunction with local Marion candy company Shirk's, created one of the first formulas of caramel popcorn for broad commercialization.

In 1964 both Wyandot Popcorn and Popped-Right consolidated their office operations into a new facility in Marion, Ohio while maintaining the raw popcorn processing on the farm in Wyandot County. Also in the 1960s Popped-Right, under the direction of son Warren Brown, diversified into corn-based snacks to supply regional potato chip marketers who were seeking to compete against a growing Frito Lay. The raw popcorn business, led by son George Brown, continued to grow as well, to the point where Wyandot was selling 50 million pounds of popcorn and selling it to over 75 countries, representing nearly a quarter of the global trade in raw popcorn. By the 1980s Wyandot was the second largest processor of popcorn in the United States. Both businesses were consolidated in 1981 under Wyandot, Inc.

In 1981 Wyandot purchased a second snack manufacturing location in Jeffersonville, Indiana.

In 1989 Wyandot sold its raw popcorn operation to Vogel Popcorn, who subsequently sold the business to ConAgra Foods.

With an increased focus on contract manufacturing versus private label business and business with regional potato chip companies, Wyandot sold the Jeffersonville plant in 2004.

In the first decade of the 2000s Wyandot manufactured Cracker Jack for Frito Lay, as well as Pringles Select chips for Pringles when that brand was owned by P&G.

In March 2018 Wyandot elected three snack industry veterans to its board of directors: James Kairos, formerly of Bare Snacks, Sundia and Odwalla; Blake Thompson, former SVP and operations/logistic leader for Snyder's-Lance and Frito Lay, and Steve Van Tassel, former CEO of Weetabix, North America and former President of Post Cereals. In 2021 Jolie Weber, CEO of Lenny & Larry's and former CEO of Wise Foods, joined the company's Board.

Wyandot was certified as a B Corporation in January 2020. Wyandot is one of the largest food & beverage contract manufacturers in the world to achieve this certification.

== Products and manufacturing capabilities ==
Products made from single and twin screw extrusion capabilities include curls and puffs made singly or in combinations of corn, rice, pulses (like chickpeas, beans, peas), made from fruits and other vegetables, fortified with vitamins and minerals, and made with ancient grains.

RTE popcorn is made both air and kettle popped.

Corn based snacks include corn chips, tortilla chips, and tortilla strips.

Wyandot once utilized a former P&G craft chip line to manufacture specialty chips made from chickpeas and combinations of various vegetable components.
