= Marion, Ohio =

- City
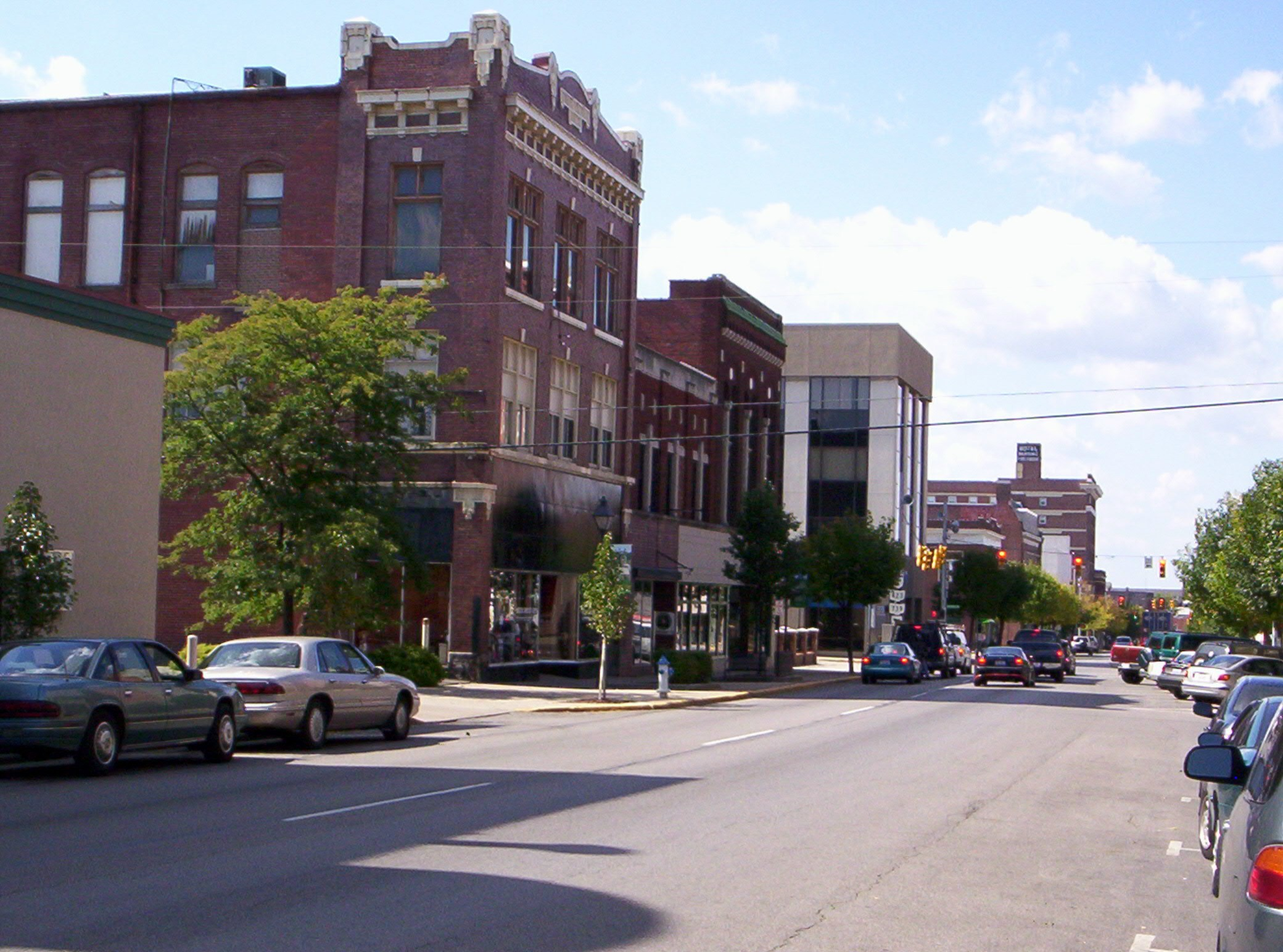
- West Center Street, downtown Marion, 2007

- Flag
- Nicknames: City of Kings, Popcorn Capital of the World
- Interactive map of Marion, Ohio
- Location within Ohio Location within the United States
- Coordinates: 40°35′19″N 83°7′44″W
- Country: United States
- State: Ohio
- County: Marion
- Township: Marion
- Founded: 1822

Area
  - Total: 13.05 sq mi (33.81 km^{2})
  - Land: 12.97 sq mi (33.58 km^{2})
  - Water: 0.089 sq mi (0.23 km^{2}) 0.68%
- Elevation: 988 ft (301 m)

Population (2020)
  - Total: 35,999
  - Density: 2,776.9/sq mi (1,072.16/km^{2})
- Demonym: Marionaire
- Time zone: UTC-5 (EST)
  - Summer (DST): UTC-4 (EDT)
- ZIP codes: 43301, 43302, 43306, 43307
- Area codes: 740, 220
- FIPS code: 39-47754
- GNIS feature ID: 2395008
- Website: marionohio.us

Marion is a city in Marion County, Ohio, United States, and its county seat. It is located in north-central Ohio, approximately 50 miles (80 km) north of Columbus. The population was 35,999 at the 2020 census, down slightly from 36,837 at the 2010 census. It is the largest city in Marion County and the principal city of the Marion micropolitan area. It is also part of the larger Columbus–Marion–Zanesville, OH Combined Statistical Area.

President Warren G. Harding, a former owner of the Marion Star, was a resident of Marion for much of his adult life and is buried at Harding Tomb. The city and its development were closely related to industrialist Edward Huber and his extensive business interests. The city is home to several historic properties, some listed on the National Register of Historic Places listings in Marion County, Ohio.

Marion currently styles itself as "America's Workforce Development Capital" given public–private educational partnerships and coordination of educational venues, from four and two–year college programs to vocational and technical training and skill certification programs. The mayor of Marion is Bill Collins.

== History ==
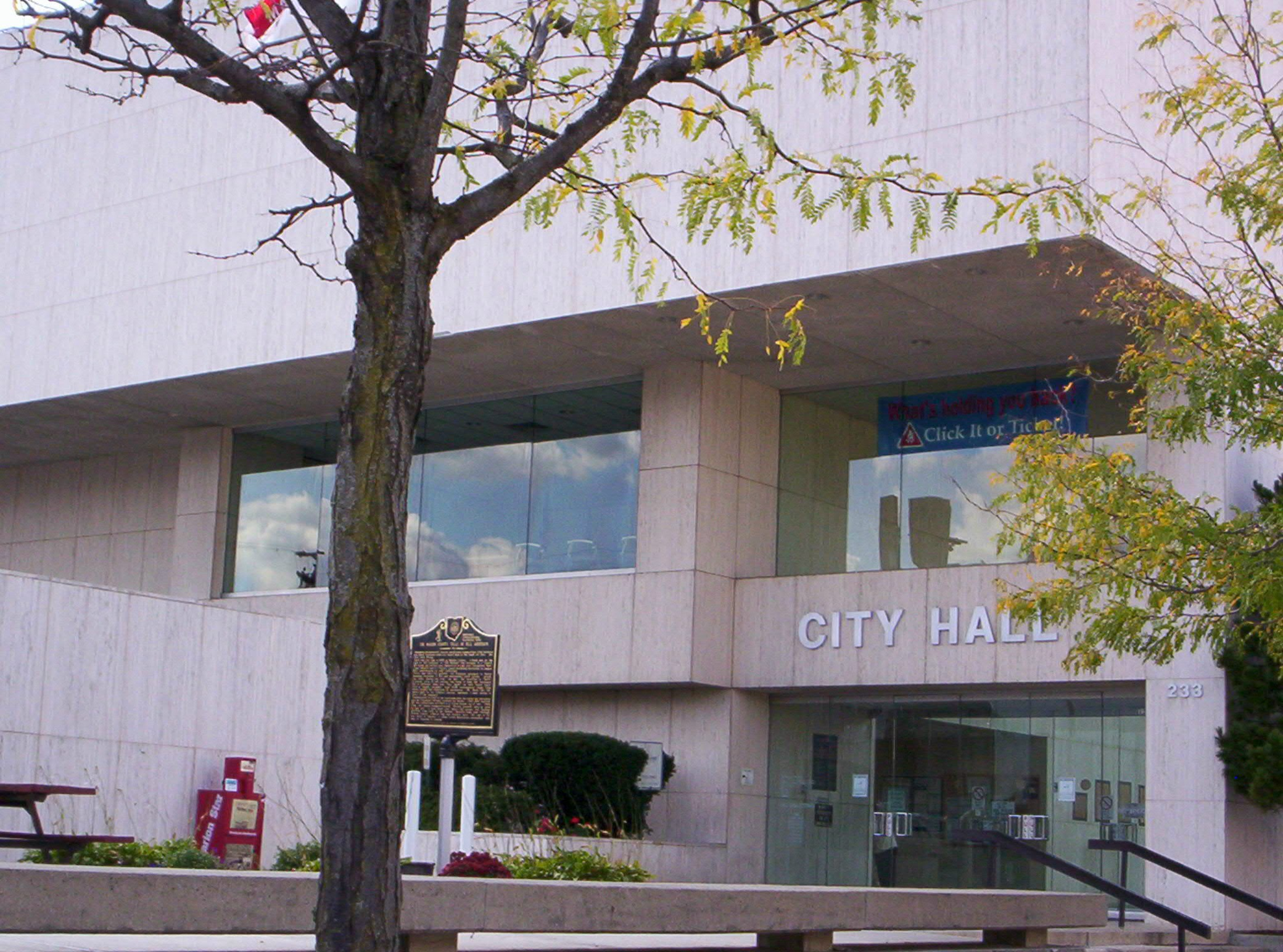
City Hall in downtown Marion

Marion was laid out in 1822, and is named in honor of General Francis Marion. It was incorporated as a village by the Legislature of Ohio in its 1829–1830 session. On March 15, 1830, Marion elected Nathan Peters as its first Mayor.

Marion was one of Ohio's major industrial centers until the 1970s. Products of the Marion Steam Shovel Company (later Marion Power Shovel) were used by contractors to build the Panama Canal, the Hoover Dam, and dug the Holland Tunnel under the Hudson River. In 1911, 80% of the nation's steam shovel and heavy-duty earth moving equipment was manufactured in Marion, Ohio. NASA contracted with Marion Power Shovel to manufacture the crawler-transporters that moved the assembled Saturn V rockets (used for Project Apollo) to the launch pad.

The city is a rail center for CSX, and Norfolk Southern. Marion has long been a center of grain based (corn and popcorn) snack and other products given its close proximity to nearby growing regions in adjacent counties (ConAgra had a major presence in Marion for decades, and Wyandot Snacks has been active in Marion since the 1960s). Whirlpool Corporation is the largest employer in the city operating the largest clothes dryer manufacturing facility in the world. Nucor Steel's facility in Marion is the largest producer of rebar and signpost in Ohio.

During the 1800s Marion served as a stop in the Underground Railroad known in Ohio as the River to Lake Freedom Trail. In 1839, a Black man, Bill Mitchell, was accused of being a fugitive slave in Marion and was freed in the ensuing legal case. A number of Virginians seeking to reclaim him for his owner brawled in the courtroom in response. The former slave was spirited away by Marion abolitionists and he ultimately made his way to Canada. In February 1919, nearly all of Marion's African American residents were driven out of town in response to an attack on a White woman. Marion subsequently became a sundown town, where African Americans were prevented from residing. President Harding, in spite of criticisms, employed African Americans at the Marion Star. In the 1920s, Marion city and Marion County supported Native American Jim Thorpe and his efforts to field an all–Native American NFL team called the Oorang Indians. In the 1970s, Dr. Dalsukh Madia, an Indian American, became head of the Smith Center at Marion General Hospital (now part of OhioHealth).

Today, non-White people constitute 14% of Marion's population. In July 2020 the Marion City Council, led by Mayor Scott Schertzer, unanimously passed a resolution vowing to promote racial equality and justice for its African American community.

== Geography ==
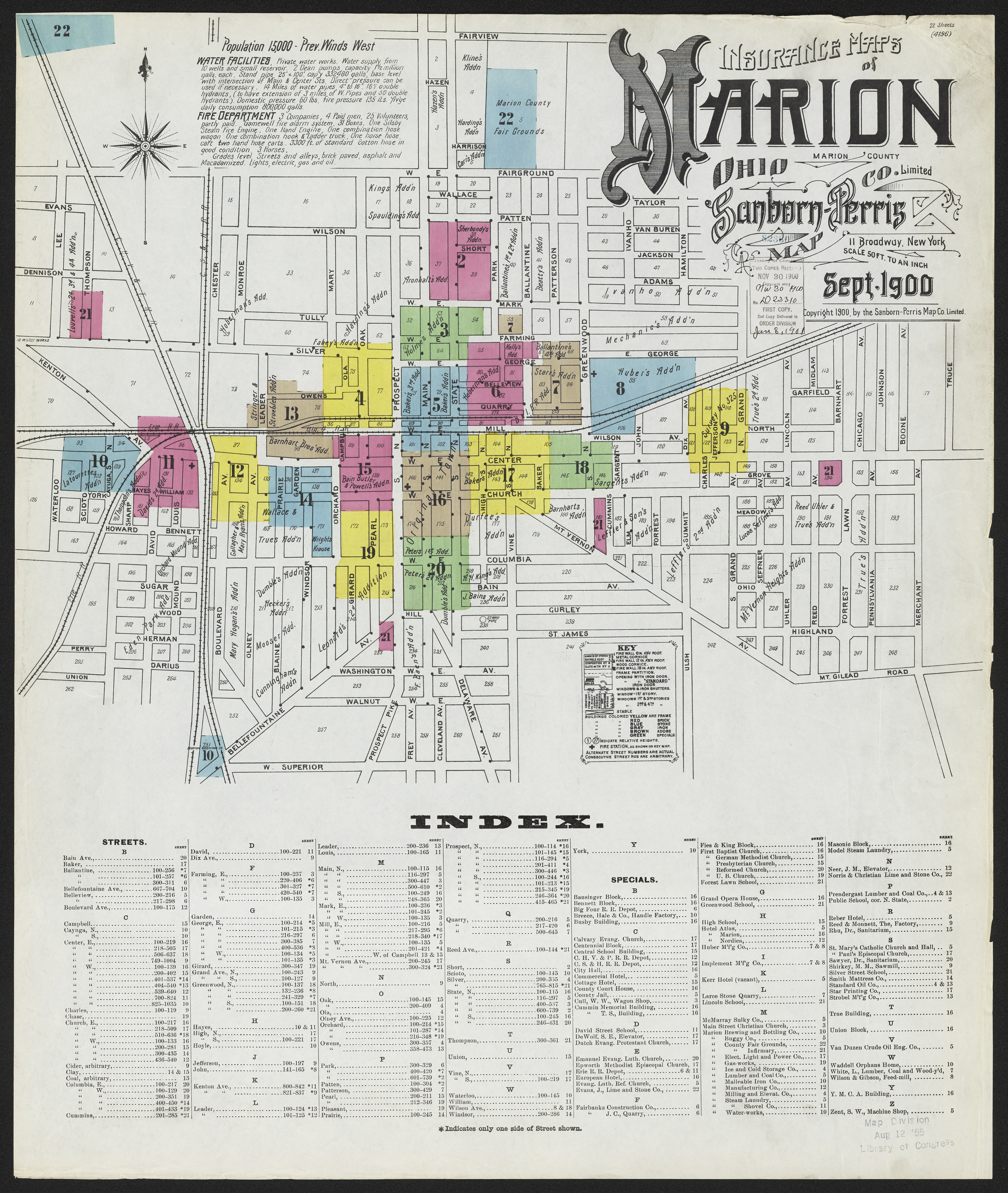
Map of Marion, Ohio in 1900

Marion is located in the Till plain geological area of Ohio. The flat land was formed (12,000–14,000 years ago) of glacial till that formed when a sheet of ice became detached from the main body of a glacier and melted in place, depositing the sediments it carried. Two small glacial lake plains are located to the west of the city. The county has gently rolling moraine hills left from the retreating glaciers.

Because of the glacial action, the soils are highly productive for agriculture. The soils are blount, pewamo and glynwood.

The city is located about 50 miles (80 km) north of Ohio's capital city, Columbus, due north along U.S. Route 23. Marion occupies most of Marion Township, which is located just outside the city limits.

According to the United States Census Bureau, the city has a total area of 11.82 square miles (30.61 km^{2}), of which 11.74 square miles (30.41 km^{2}) is land and 0.08 square miles (0.21 km^{2}) is water.

=== Climate ===
Climate data for Marion, Ohio (1991–2020 normals, extremes 1936-2017)
Month	Jan	Feb	Mar	Apr	May	Jun	Jul	Aug	Sep	Oct	Nov	Dec	Year
Record high °F (°C)	67 (19)	73 (23)	84 (29)	89 (32)	96 (36)	103 (39)	105 (41)	102 (39)	100 (38)	91 (33)	80 (27)	73 (23)	105 (41)
Mean maximum °F (°C)	56 (13)	60 (16)	71 (22)	81 (27)	87 (31)	92 (33)	92 (33)	91 (33)	88 (31)	81 (27)	69 (21)	60 (16)	94 (34)
Mean daily maximum °F (°C)	34.0 (1.1)	37.1 (2.8)	47.5 (8.6)	60.9 (16.1)	71.7 (22.1)	80.3 (26.8)	83.7 (28.7)	82.0 (27.8)	76.2 (24.6)	64.1 (17.8)	50.3 (10.2)	38.8 (3.8)	60.5 (15.8)
Daily mean °F (°C)	25.9 (−3.4)	28.6 (−1.9)	37.6 (3.1)	49.5 (9.7)	60.6 (15.9)	69.9 (21.1)	73.1 (22.8)	71.3 (21.8)	64.5 (18.1)	53.1 (11.7)	41.3 (5.2)	31.4 (−0.3)	50.6 (10.3)
Mean daily minimum °F (°C)	17.9 (−7.8)	20.1 (−6.6)	27.7 (−2.4)	38.2 (3.4)	49.6 (9.8)	59.6 (15.3)	62.6 (17.0)	60.5 (15.8)	52.9 (11.6)	42.1 (5.6)	32.4 (0.2)	24.0 (−4.4)	40.6 (4.8)
Mean minimum °F (°C)	−3 (−19)	2 (−17)	11 (−12)	24 (−4)	35 (2)	45 (7)	52 (11)	50 (10)	40 (4)	29 (−2)	18 (−8)	7 (−14)	−5 (−21)
Record low °F (°C)	−23 (−31)	−23 (−31)	−11 (−24)	6 (−14)	21 (−6)	36 (2)	41 (5)	35 (2)	24 (−4)	14 (−10)	−5 (−21)	−21 (−29)	−23 (−31)
Average precipitation inches (mm)	2.73 (69)	1.96 (50)	2.71 (69)	3.83 (97)	4.20 (107)	4.39 (112)	4.26 (108)	3.30 (84)	3.33 (85)	3.00 (76)	3.01 (76)	2.71 (69)	39.43 (1,002)
Average snowfall inches (cm)	7.6 (19)	6.6 (17)	4.1 (10)	0.4 (1.0)	0 (0)	0 (0)	0 (0)	0 (0)	0 (0)	0 (0)	0.6 (1.5)	4.5 (11)	23.8 (60)
Average extreme snow depth inches (cm)	5 (13)	5 (13)	3 (7.6)	0 (0)	0 (0)	0 (0)	0 (0)	0 (0)	0 (0)	0 (0)	0 (0)	3 (7.6)	8 (20)
Average precipitation days (≥ 0.01 in)	12	9	11	13	13	12	11	10	10	10	10	11	132
Average snowy days (≥ 0.1 in)	6	5	2	1	0	0	0	0	0	0	1	3	21
Source: NOAA

== Demographics ==
Historical population
Census	Pop.	Note	%±
1830	287		—
1840	570		98.6%
1850	1,311		130.0%
1860	1,844		40.7%
1870	2,531		37.3%
1880	3,899		54.0%
1890	8,327		113.6%
1900	11,862		42.5%
1910	18,232		53.7%
1920	27,891		53.0%
1930	31,084		11.4%
1940	30,817		−0.9%
1950	33,817		9.7%
1960	37,079		9.6%
1970	38,646		4.2%
1980	37,040		−4.2%
1990	34,075		−8.0%
2000	35,318		3.6%
2010	36,837		4.3%
2020	35,999		−2.3%
2025 (est.)	35,587		−1.1%
Population 1830-2000. Population 2010.

=== 2020 census ===
As of the 2020 census, Marion had a population of 35,999. The median age was 38.8 years. 20.9% of residents were under the age of 18 and 15.9% of residents were 65 years of age or older. For every 100 females there were 126.6 males, and for every 100 females age 18 and over there were 132.5 males age 18 and over.

99.9% of residents lived in urban areas, while 0.1% lived in rural areas.

There were 12,874 households in Marion, of which 29.6% had children under the age of 18 living in them. Of all households, 34.2% were married-couple households, 21.5% were households with a male householder and no spouse or partner present, and 33.1% were households with a female householder and no spouse or partner present. About 33.4% of all households were made up of individuals and 14.6% had someone living alone who was 65 years of age or older.

There were 14,539 housing units, of which 11.5% were vacant. The homeowner vacancy rate was 2.3% and the rental vacancy rate was 10.9%.

Racial composition as of the 2020 census
Race	Number	Percent
White	29,476	81.9%
Black or African American	3,784	10.5%
American Indian and Alaska Native	131	0.4%
Asian	157	0.4%
Native Hawaiian and Other Pacific Islander	9	0.0%
Some other race	564	1.6%
Two or more races	1,878	5.2%
Hispanic or Latino (of any race)	1,339	3.7%

=== 2022 American Community Survey ===
As of the 2022 American Community Survey estimates, there were 35,927 people and 12,266 households. The population density was 2,771.3 inhabitants per square mile (1,070.0/km^{2}). There were 14,326 housing units at an average density of 1,105.1 units per square mile (426.7 units/km^{2}). The racial makeup of the city was 81.7% White, 9.2% Black or African American, 1.6% some other race, 0.3% Native American or Alaskan Native, 0.3% Asian, and 0.1% Native Hawaiian or Other Pacific Islander, with 6.9% from two or more races. Hispanics or Latinos of any race were 4.5% of the population.

Of the 12,266 households, 29.4% had children under the age of 18 living with them, 28.3% had seniors 65 years or older living with them, 36.1% were married couples living together, 11.2% were couples cohabitating, 20.5% had a male householder with no partner present, and 32.1% had a female householder with no partner present. The median household size was 2.50 and the median family size was 3.25.

The age distribution was 20.5% under 18, 9.0% from 18 to 24, 30.3% from 25 to 44, 26.1% from 45 to 64, and 14.1% who were 65 or older. The median age was 37.7 years. For every 100 females, there were 129.9 males.

The median income for a household was $44,879, with family households having a median income of $53,855 and non-family households $30,948. The per capita income was $20,974. Males working full-time jobs had median earnings of $45,719 compared to $37,273 for females. Out of the 30,729 people with a determined poverty status, 21.8% were below the poverty line. Further, 30.9% of minors and 13.3% of seniors were below the poverty line.

In the survey, residents self-identified with various ethnic ancestries. People of German descent made up 20.7% of the population of the town, followed by English at 13.3%, Irish at 12.7%, American at 9.2%, Italian at 2.7%, Scottish at 2.1%, Dutch at 1.7%, Welsh at 1.7%, French at 1.7%, Polish at 1.3%, Sub-Saharan African at 0.7%, Scotch-Irish at 0.7%, Arab at 0.5%, and Hungarian at 0.5%.

=== 2010 census ===
As of the census of 2010, there were 36,837 people, 12,868 households, and 8,175 families residing in the city. The population density was 3,137.7 inhabitants per square mile (1,211.5/km^{2}). There were 15,066 housing units at an average density of 1,283.3 units per square mile (495.5 units/km^{2}). The racial makeup of the city was 86.7% White, 9.6% African American, 0.2% Native American, 0.4% Asian, 1.1% from other races, and 2.1% from two or more races. Hispanic or Latino of any race were 3.0% of the population.

There were 12,868 households, of which 33.5% had children under the age of 18 living with them, 40.0% were married couples living together, 17.1% had a female householder with no husband present, 6.4% had a male householder with no wife present, and 36.5% were non-families. 30.4% of all households were made up of individuals, and 12.7% had someone living alone who was 65 years of age or older. The average household size was 2.45 and the average family size was 3.00.

The median age in the city was 37.3 years. 22.2% of residents were under the age of 18; 9.9% were between the ages of 18 and 24; 28.7% were from 25 to 44; 26.6% were from 45 to 64; and 12.6% were 65 years of age or older. The gender makeup of the city was 54.9% male and 45.1% female.

=== 2000 census ===
As of the census of 2000, there were 35,318 people, 13,551 households, and 8,821 families residing in the city. The population density was 3,111.6 inhabitants per square mile (1,201.4/km^{2}). There were 14,713 housing units at an average density of 1,296.8 units per square mile (500.7 units/km^{2}). The racial makeup of the city was 90.40% White, 7.01% African American, 0.20% Native American, 0.54% Asian, 0.01% Pacific Islander, 0.64% from other races, and 1.20% from two or more races. Hispanic or Latino of any race were 1.34% of the population.

There were 13,551 households, out of which 31.6% had children under the age of 18 living with them, 46.3% were married couples living together, 14.1% had a female householder with no husband present, and 34.9% were non-families. 29.3% of all households were made up of individuals, and 12.0% had someone living alone who was 65 years of age or older. The average household size was 2.44 and the average family size was 3.00.

In the city the population was spread out, with 25.2% under the age of 18, 9.3% from 18 to 24, 30.8% from 25 to 44, 21.5% from 45 to 64, and 13.2% who were 65 years of age or older. The median age was 35 years. For every 100 females, there were 102.3 males. For every 100 females age 18 and over, there were 101.5 males.

The median income for a household in the city was $33,124, and the median income for a family was $40,000. Males had a median income of $31,126 versus $22,211 for females. The per capita income for the city was $16,247. About 10.9% of families and 13.8% of the population were below the poverty line, including 20.2% of those under age 18 and 6.9% of those age 65 or over.

== Economy ==
While Marion and the surrounding area is generally rural, manufacturing is a significant source of employment. The county is a well-positioned rail transportation hub with access to U.S. 23, serving as a major connection to Interstate 80 and Interstate 90 through Detroit and Toledo to the north, and connections to Interstate 71 and Interstate 70 through nearby Columbus.

One of the largest intermodal freight transport facilities in the country is located in Marion. It provides rail and local truck delivery services for Whirlpool Corporation, International Paper and major automotive parts manufacturers, among many others.

Whirlpool's dryer manufacturing facility in Marion is the largest in the world, producing over 20,000 dryers daily.

The unemployment rate for Marion County as of July 2019 was 4.4%.

=== Largest employers ===
According to the Marion Chamber of Commerce and Marion CanDo (the economic development office of Marion), the largest industrial employers in the city are:

#	Employer	# of Employees
1	Whirlpool Corporation	2,900
2	Silverline Windows	670
3	Wyandot Snacks	336
4	Piston Group	302
5	Nucor Steel	263
6	Graphic Packaging	250
6	Union Tank Car Company	250
8	US Yachiyo, Inc.	240
9	General Mills	200
10	TODCO	140
11	ArcelorMittal	104
12	Sims Brothers	103
13	International Paper	101
13	Sika Corp.	101

=== Recent developments ===
Like most of Central Ohio, Marion has been experiencing an economic resurgence since the end of the Great Recession. Ohio is the second largest steel producing state in America, and local employer Nucor Steel, whose Marion facility is the largest manufacturer of rebar and signposts in Ohio, announced in March 2017 it was spending $85 million on a modernization program. Also in 2017 POET announced it was spending $120 million to more than double its ethanol manufacturing capacity to 150 million gallons a year.

MarionMade!, an advertising campaign, is designed to promote positive news about the area's people, places, products, and programs. The MarionMade! advertising program won a 2017 PRism Award from the Central Ohio Chapter of the Public Relations Society of America (PRSA).

== Arts and culture ==
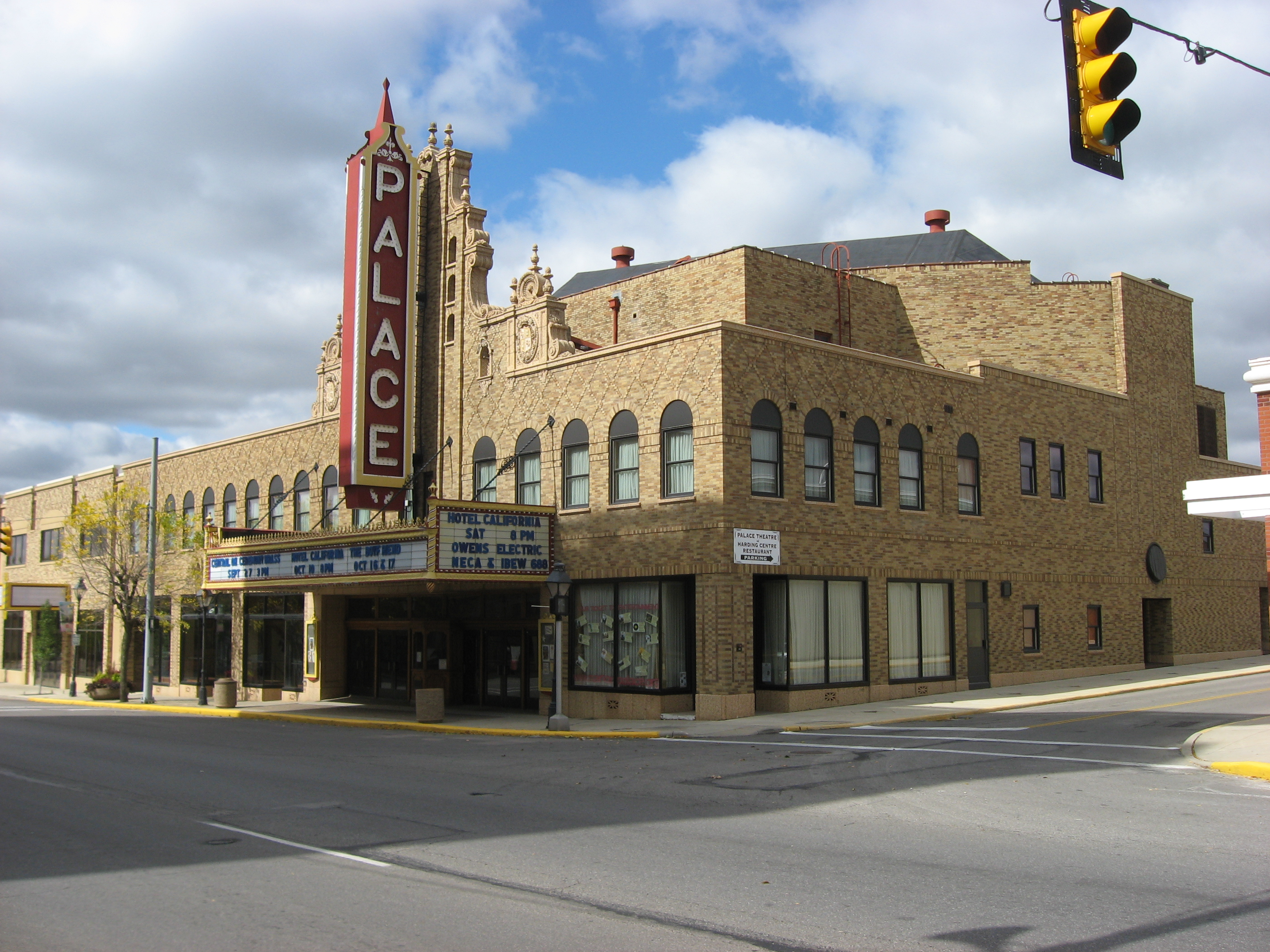
Palace Theatre (c. 1928)

=== Performing arts ===
The Palace Theatre (c. 1928) is a 1,440-seat atmospheric theatre designed by John Eberson in the Spanish Colonial Revival architecture style. It has been in continuous operation since it opened on August 30, 1928. Restored in 1975, it is one of only 16 remaining Eberson-designed atmospheric theatres still in operation in the United States today. Eberson designed the theatre for Young Amusement Company, at an original cost of $500,000 ($8.6 million in 2023 dollars). Inside, the auditorium resembles an outdoor palace courtyard, complete with a blue sky and twinkling stars. It has many original Pietro Caproni sculpture castings. The theatre is registered on the National Register of Historic Places. Adjoining the theatre is the May Pavilion, a two-story event space for chamber orchestra concerts, jazz and soft rock bands, amateur theatre productions of plays and small cast musicals, wedding receptions, graduation parties and meetings.

The theatre presents touring artists and children's theatre. During the off-season and at other times during the year when the theatre would be otherwise dark, non-equity amateur theater musicals, community band concerts and high school productions are presented on the main stage and in the smaller May Pavilion. The theatre also exhibits current motion pictures.

=== Museums ===
Heritage Hall & the Old Post Office The Old U.S. Post Office (Marion, Ohio) was built in 1910. It is listed on the National Register of Historic Places (1990). The building is now used as the Heritage Hall museum of the Marion County Historical Society. The museum is dedicated to the preservation of Marion County, Ohio history.

Wyandot Popcorn Museum Heritage Hall is also home of the Wyandot Popcorn Museum, the "only museum in the world dedicated to popcorn and its associated memorabilia." Opened in 1982 prior to the second Popcorn Festival, the museum's collection consists of classic antique poppers made by Cretors, Dunbar, Kingery, Holcomb and Hoke, Long-Eakin, Excel, Manley, Burch, Star, Bartholomew, Stutsman and Advance. Not only is it one of only two Popcorn Museums in the world, it also represents the largest collection of restored popcorn antiques.

Warren G. Harding House A national presidential site, the Harding Home was the residence of Warren G. Harding, twenty-ninth president of the United States. Harding and his future wife, Florence, designed the Queen Anne Style house in 1890, a year before their marriage. They were married in the home and lived there for 30 years before his election to the presidency. Like James A. Garfield, an earlier U.S. president from Ohio, Harding conducted his election campaign mainly from the house's expansive front porch. During the 3-month front porch campaign, over 600,000 people traveled to the Harding Home to listen to the candidate speak. Harding paid $1,000 to have a Sears catalog house built behind his home so newspaper reporters had workspace to type their stories. The press house is also open to the public. The site is being expanded to include a Presidential Center for Harding, expected to be opened in 2020, the 100th anniversary of Harding's election to the Presidency.

Huber Machinery Museum This museum contains examples of Edward Huber's early steam and gasoline tractors and road-building equipment. Huber Manufacturing introduced a thresher in 1875, a steam traction engine in 1898, its first motor graders in the 1920s, a primitive hydraulic control in 1926, and the first Maintainer, a tractor-sized integral motor grader, in 1943. Other Huber products included wheel tractors, agricultural equipment, and three-wheel, tandem and pneumatic rollers.

Marion Union Station and Museum More than 100 trains pass by Union Station every day. The museum showcases an impressive collection of memorabilia and the AC Tower, which was once the main switching facility for the Erie Railroad, Marion Division. During World War II, thousands of soldiers passed through Union Station on their way to Europe.

=== Annual events and fairs ===
Marion is home to the Marion Popcorn Festival, an annual event that is held in downtown Marion in September, the weekend following Labor Day. The Marion County Fair is held every year in Marion during the first week of July. Saturday in the Park is a children's festival that is held each year in Lincoln Park.

Marion is also home to Buckeye Chuck, Ohio's official weather-predicting and State Groundhog known for predicting the arrival of spring on Groundhog Day (February 2).

The Rockin' Poppin' Organization hosts the annual Rockin' Poppin' New Year's Eve Celebration. This event lasts up to midnight, when an Illuminated Popcorn Ball is dropped 3 stories from a radio tower to countdown to the new year.

== Landmarks ==
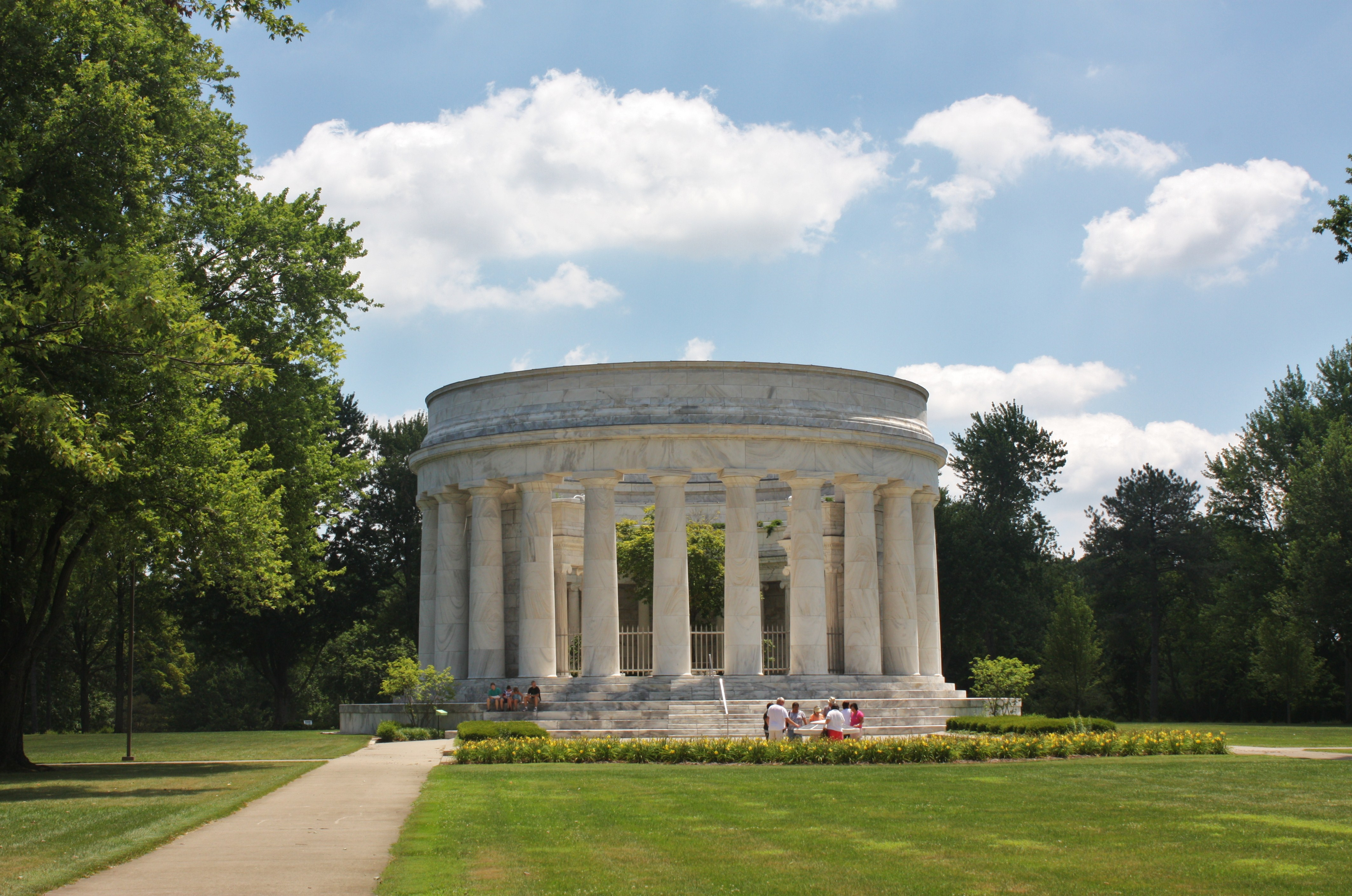
The Harding Tomb is the burial location of the 29th President of the United States, Warren G. Harding

=== Harding Home ===
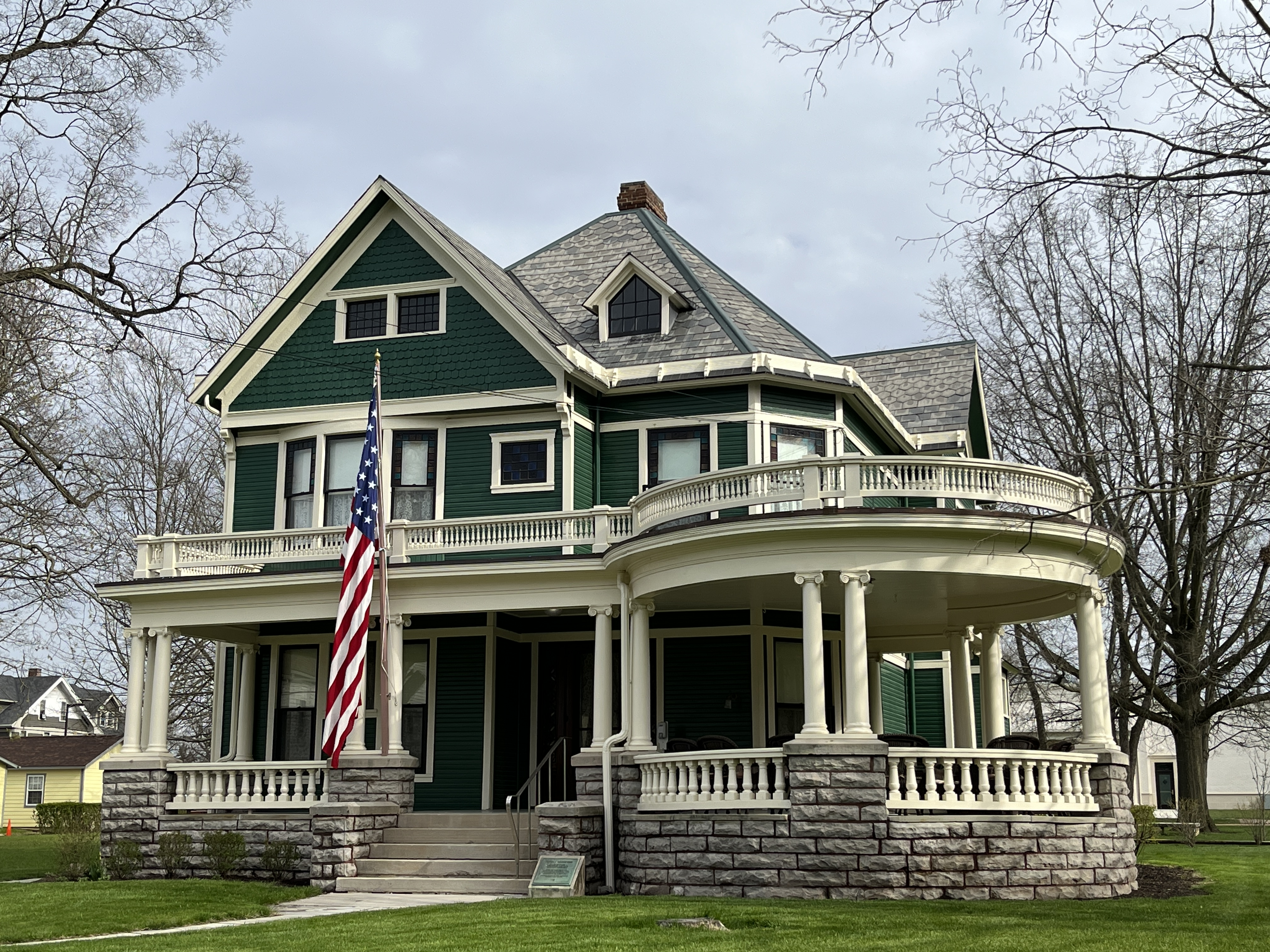
Modern photo of the Harding Home, available for touring, taken from street level. Photo taken in 2022.

The Harding Home was the residence of Warren G. Harding, twenty-ninth president of the United States. Harding and his future wife, Florence, designed the Queen Anne Style house in 1890, a year before their marriage. They were married there and lived there for 30 years before his election to the presidency.

=== Harding Memorial (Harding Tomb) ===
The Harding Memorial, as it was called by thousands of people, including schoolchildren who donated to its construction fund, is the burial location (tomb) of the 29th President of the United States, Warren G. Harding and First Lady Florence Kling Harding. Later referred to as the Harding Tomb, it is located at the southeast corner of Vernon Heights Boulevard and Delaware Avenue. Construction began in 1926 and was finished in early 1927, the Greek temple structure is built of white marble. Designed by Henry Hornbostel, Eric Fisher Wood and Edward Mellon, the structure is 103 feet in diameter and 53 feet in height. The open design honors the Hardings' wishes that they be buried outside.

=== Hotel Harding (The Harding Centre) ===
Constructed in 1924, the Hotel Harding was developed to provide lodging and fine dining for the expected post-White House visitors of President Harding. It was hoped by local entrepreneurs that the hotel would provide lodging for Warren G. Harding's visitors who came to Marion after his presidency. It was located close to Union Station, the city's main rail station. The building is no longer used as a hotel. Renovated in 2005, the building is now an apartment style community for all, and as residence for OSUM students. Its lobby has been restored to much the same condition as the original.

=== Marion Cemetery ===
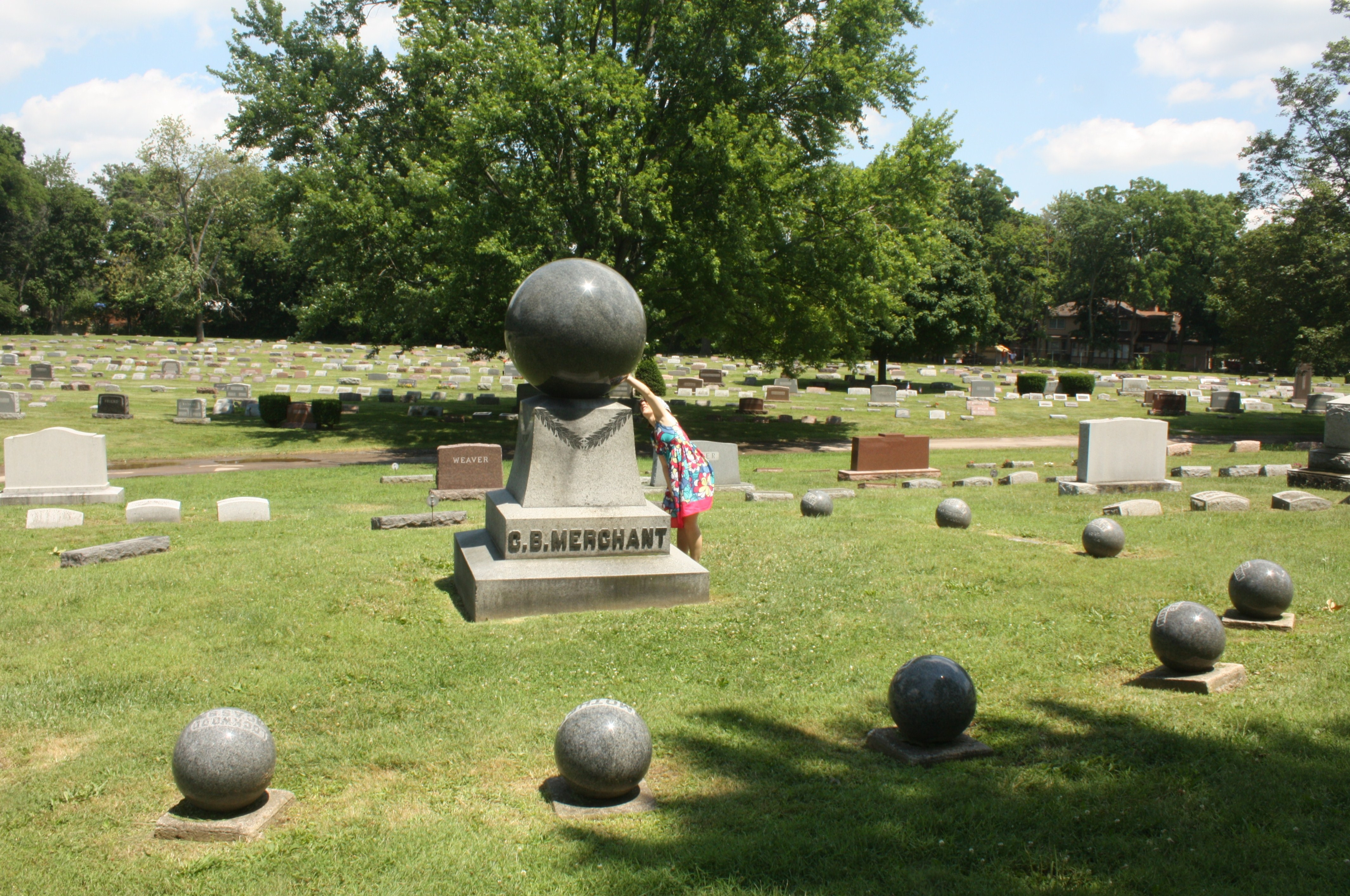
Moving sphere atop the Merchant family grave marker in Marion Cemetery

Merchant Family Memorial (The Rotating Ball). Marion Cemetery is the home to the Merchant family grave marker, known for its unintended movements. The marker consists of a large grey granite pedestal capped by a two-ton granite sphere four feet in diameter. The sphere moves on its base a 1/4 to a 1/2 inch every year, as measured by the distance traveled by the unpolished spot from where it was mated to the pedestal. While the movement of the sphere is thought to be facilitated by freeze-thaw cycles, earth tremors, or trapped air or water under the base, there has been no conclusive explanation for patterns that the sphere seems to follow. The movements of the sphere have been documented by numerous news outlets and it has been featured in Ripley's Believe it or Not (September 29, 1927). This has also been documented in Frank Edwards' book, Strange World, from an edition in the early to mid sixties. There are several web pages on the internet concerning this tombstone.

The Receiving Vault. The Marion Cemetery Receiving Vault is a funerary structure in the main cemetery of Marion, Ohio, United States. Constructed in the 1870s, this receiving vault originally fulfilled the normal purposes of such structures, but it gained prominence as the semipermanent resting place of Marion's most prominent citizen, U.S. President Warren G. Harding.

== Sports ==
The Oorang Indians, a traveling NFL team based in nearby La Rue, played their only true "home" game in Marion in 1923. It is the former home of the Marion Blue Racers, an indoor football team in X-League Indoor Football; the Marion Mayhem, also an indoor football team in the CIFL; and a professional ice hockey team, the Marion Barons, which played in the International Hockey League during the 1953–54 season.

Marion was home to numerous minor league baseball teams between 1900 and 1951, including the Marion Senators, Marion Presidents, Marion Cardinals and Marion Cubs. Future U.S. President Warren G. Harding was a part owner of the Marion Diggers, who played as members of the Class D level Ohio State League from 1908 to 1912.

Marion has been home to numerous individual and team high school state championships. In the early 1980s, Tina Kneisley was a national and world roller skating champion in pairs and ladies freestyle, and Scott Duncan was a WUSA National Champion in wrestling.

== Education ==
=== Public schools ===
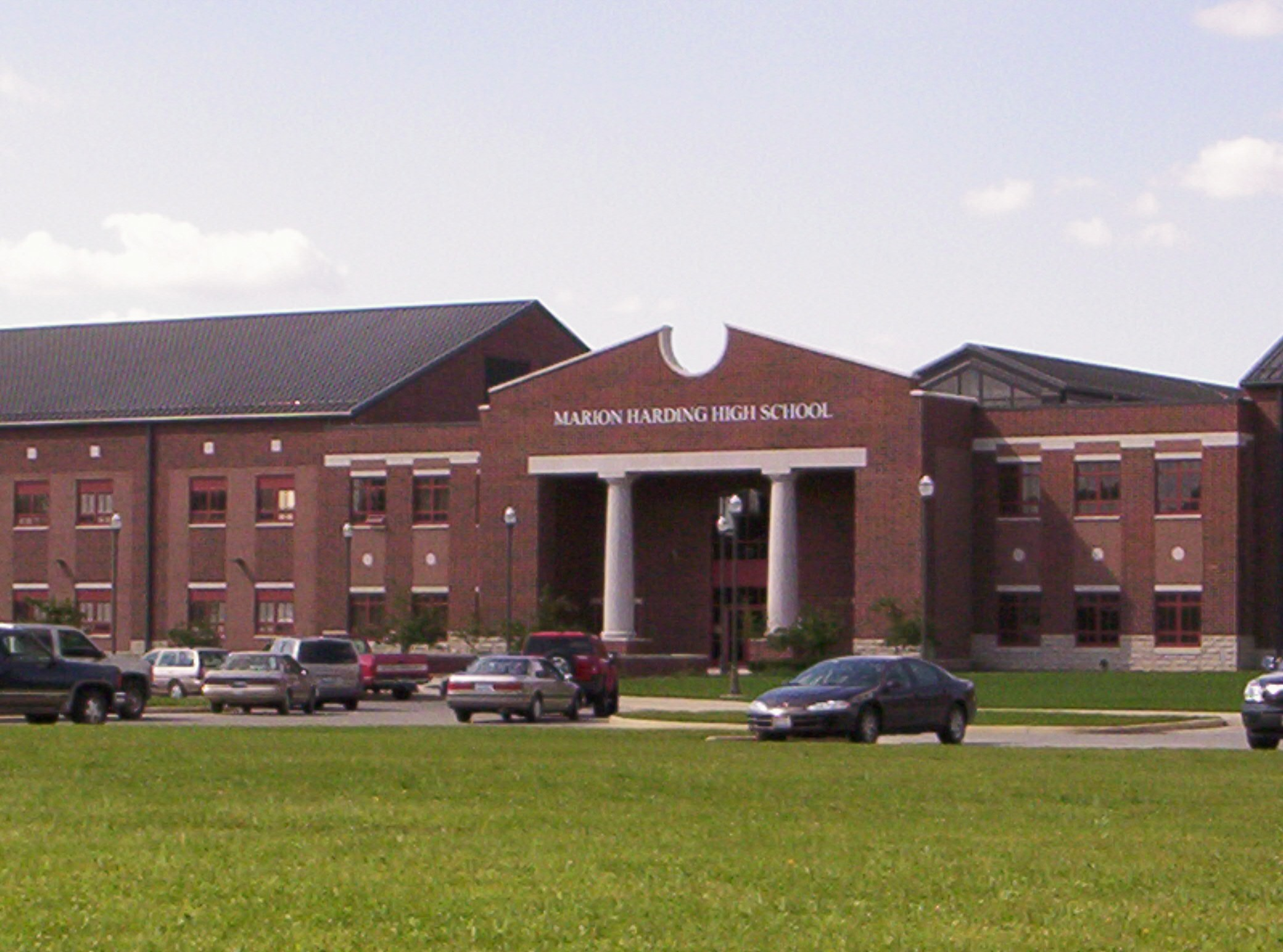
The current Marion Harding High School was built in 2003

Most of Marion is served by the Marion City School District, which enrolls 4,242 students in public primary and secondary schools, as of the 2022–23 school year, and the district's average testing ranking is 3/10, which is in the bottom 50% of public schools in Ohio. The district administers six elementary schools, one middle school, and one high school, Marion Harding High School. Parts of the city are in the neighboring Elgin Local, Pleasant Local, Ridgedale Local, and River Valley Local School Districts.

Tri-Rivers Educational Computer Association (TRECA) Digital Academy, an online public school for Ohio students in grades K–12, is headquartered in Marion. Operated by TRECA, the school provides students in many school districts in Ohio with distance learning options.

=== Parochial schools ===
Marion is home to one parochial school, St. Mary's School, which includes grades K–8 and is affiliated with the Roman Catholic Diocese of Columbus.

=== Vocational education ===
Marion is also home to Tri-Rivers Career Center and Center for Adult Education offering career technical educations to high school and adult students in Central Ohio. Tri-Rivers is the site for RAMTEC—the Robotics & Advanced Manufacturing Technology Education Collaborative.

=== Higher education ===
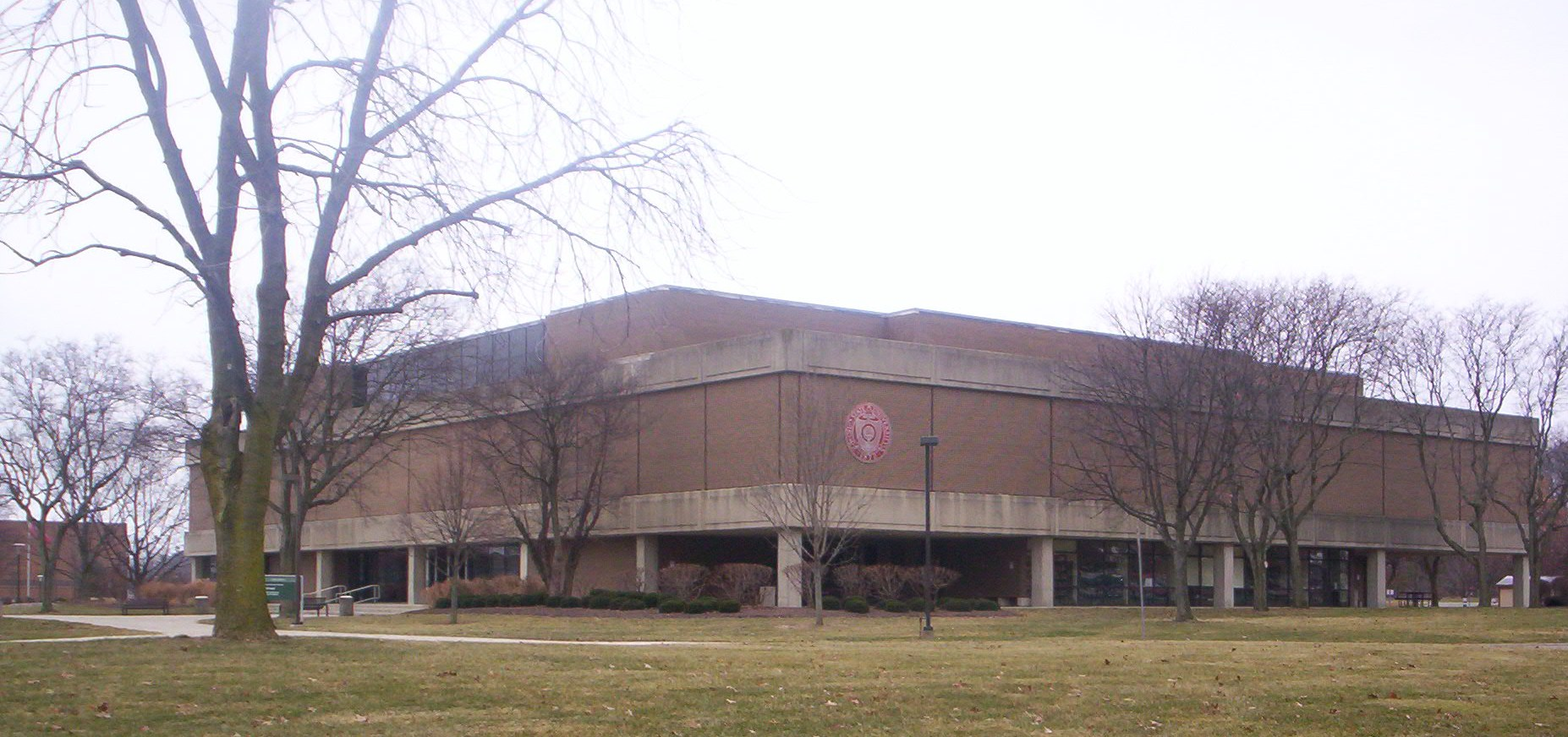
Morrill Hall, Ohio State University at Marion

Marion is home to two institutions of higher learning:

- Ohio State University at Marion, a regional campus of The Ohio State University
- Marion Technical College, a community college that shares the OSU Marion Campus
- Tri-Rivers Career Center, a career and trade school which in recent years, built a trade school addition focused on robotics, generally aimed towards the same robotics used in auto manufacturing.

=== Libraries ===
The Marion Public Library is the city's main public library.

The Marion Campus Library of the OSU Marion Campus contains over 48,000 books, a large reference collection, and over 300 subscriptions. The library collection also includes print periodical indexes, microforms, maps, newspapers, pamphlet file, special collections in careers and children's literature, and the Warren G. Harding/Norman Thomas Research Collection. It provides access to all the resources of the Ohio State University and Ohio Link.

== Media ==
The Marion Star, founded in 1877 and once owned by Warren Harding, is owned by Gannett. It is published daily and is the city's only newspaper.

Among Marion's radio stations are WMRN-FM (94.3 FM) country music station, WMRN (1490 AM) news/talk (iHeartRadio), WOSB (91.1 FM) NPR News and classical music station, WYNT (95.9 FM) adult contemporary station, and WDIF-LP blues music station.

WOCB-CD is an independent Christian inspirational low-power television station on digital UHF channel 39, broadcasting local church services and programs and public events throughout central Ohio.

== Infrastructure ==
=== Transportation ===
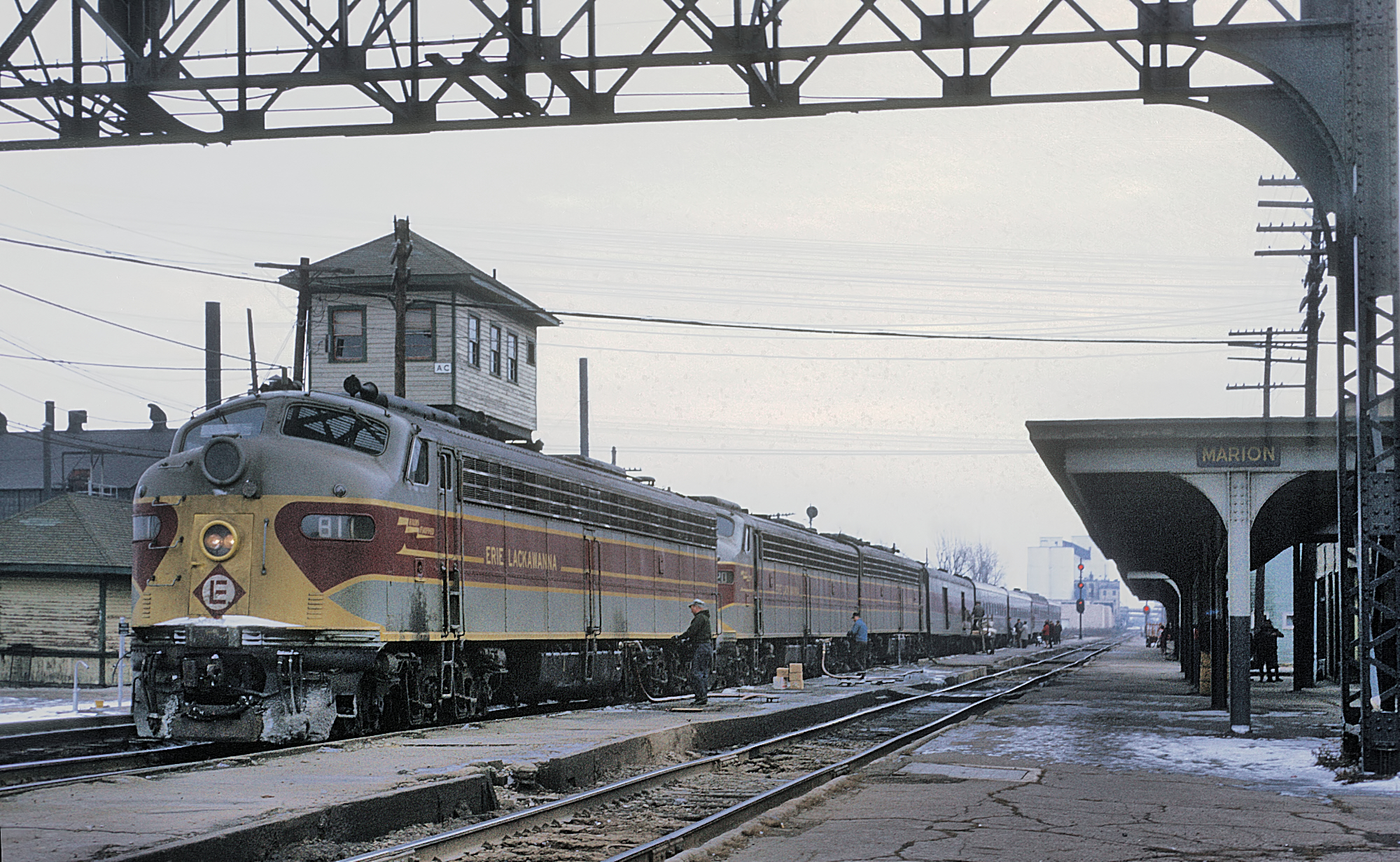
The Lake Cities at Marion Union Station in 1969

The Marion Municipal Airport is located three nautical miles (3.5 mi; 5.6 km) northeast of the central business district.

Transportation services are available from local air charter companies and taxi services. Also, Marion had a Greyhound Bus terminal, however it was taken out and is now a transport hub for city transportation only.

U.S. Route 23 runs north to Findlay and Upper Sandusky and other points north from the eastern edge of Marion; and it runs south towards Columbus and other points south. Ohio state routes 4, 309 and 423 run through the city.

Into the 1960s several railroads made stops at Marion Union Station; the station's last long-distance trains (Erie Lackawanna's Lake Cities) which left in 1970 and a connecting line to the Chesapeake and Ohio Railway's George Washington which ended with the hand over of passenger service to Amtrak in 1971.

== Notable people ==
Marion is both the hometown and burial location of President Warren G. Harding and First Lady Florence Harding. It is also the birthplace and childhood home of Norman Mattoon Thomas, six-time candidate for President of the United States under the Socialist Party of America ticket and co-founder of the American Civil Liberties Union (ACLU).

Harding's sister, Carolyn Harding Votaw, also lived in Marion. During Harding's administration, she was appointed to head the social service division of the U.S. Public Health Service, while her husband was named Superintendent of Prisons and chairman of the boards of parole at each institution. Mrs. Votaw also served as an advisor to the Federal Board of Vocation Education within the Veterans’ Bureau, which caused her name to arise during testimony in the successful prosecution of the Bureau's director, Charles R. Forbes, on corruption charges.

Elsie Janis, the Broadway musical theatre star, Hollywood screenwriter, composer and actress, and "Sweetheart of the American Expeditionary Forces" (AEF) during World War I, was a native of Marion County.

In 1938, local tap dance instructor Marilyn Meseke, was crowned Miss America 1938—the first year that talent was considered part of the annual competition.

Mary Ellen Withrow (née Hinamon), Treasurer of the United States from 1994 until 2001 is a Marion County native. Withrow is the only person in the history of the United States to have held the governmental position of Treasurer on the local (Marion County Ohio Treasurer), state (Treasurer of the State of Ohio) and Federal levels of Government.

Jim Thorpe spent time in Marion County as the coach and lead player for the Native American-led National Football League Oorang Indians. While the team was based in La Rue the Indians played at "home" in Marion.

Other notable people who lived in Marion include:

- Brian Agler, former head coach of basketball's Columbus Quest and current head coach for the Los Angeles Sparks
- Bob Allen (shortstop) (1867–1943), shortstop for the Philadelphia Phillies, Boston Beaneaters, and Cincinnati Reds, manager with the Phillies and Reds; as a youth, he played baseball with Warren G. Harding
- Eber Baker, founder of Marion
- Larry Barnett, umpire 1969–1999 Major League Baseball; worked infamous Game 3 of 1975 World Series and 1996 American League Championship Series that involved fan young fan Jeffrey Maier
- James A. Beckel, Jr., composer
- Hugh C. Benner, minister and general superintendent in the Church of the Nazarene
- Ozias Bowen (1805–1871), Ohio Supreme Court judge 1856–1858; his residence is owned by the Marion County Historical Association, which operates it as the Stengel-True Museum
- Nan Britton, author of The President's Daughter and mother of President Warren G. Harding's only child
- Lois McMaster Bujold, award-winning science fiction and fantasy author; lived in Marion at the start of her writing career
- George H. Busby, member of the U.S. House of Representatives
- John Courtright, pitcher at Duke and first professional pitcher to face Michael Jordan in the minor leagues; pitched in one Major League game May 6, 1995, for the Cincinnati Reds
- Daniel Richard Crissinger, Chairman of the Federal Reserve Board and 14th Comptroller of the Currency
- John Dean, lawyer, Nixon Administration official, Watergate key witness, historian on Warren G. Harding, and critic of President Donald Trump
- Jeanne Dietsch, New Hampshire state senator; former tech entrepreneur
- James H. Godman, Ohio state auditor (1864–1872)
- Shawn Grate, convicted serial killer
- Tommy Griffith, player for Cincinnati Reds
- Toby Harrah, MLB player, four-time All-Star, coach with the Detroit Tigers
- Steven Hicks, front office, Minnesota Vikings
- George Hogan, baseball player
- Edward Huber, industrialist and inventor of the gasoline-powered tractor
- Aubrey Huff, baseball player
- Elsie Janis, early 20th Century singer, songwriter, actress, and screenwriter. First female announcer for the NBC radio network.
- Genevra Johnstone-Bishop, soprano
- John A. Key, member of House of Representatives
- Florence Kling DeWolfe Harding, wife of Warren G. Harding, First Lady of the United States, 1921–1923
- Huey Lewis, singer and songwriter, lived in Marion from 1951 to 1957
- Ed McCants, basketball player, college All American and Horizon League player of the year 2000, University of Wisconsin Milwaukee "All Decade Team" (2000)
- Walter McClaskey, member Ohio House of Representatives
- O.J. McDuffie, football player, wide receiver for Penn State and NFL's Miami Dolphins
- Rick Mills, glass artist
- Steve Mills, juggler
- Grant E. Mouser, U.S. House of Representatives (1905–1909), who in 1905 and 1906 added a total of $95,000 in appropriations to build the Old Post Office
- Grant E. Mouser Jr., U.S. House of Representatives (1929–1933)
- Gerry Mulligan, saxophonist, composer, jazz artist also known as "Jeru"
- Taya Parker, model
- George Pfann, football coach, elected to the College Football Hall of Fame
- Carrie Phillips, mistress of Warren G. Harding, only woman known to have blackmailed a major American political party successfully
- Aron Ralston, outdoorsman, author of Between a Rock and a Hard Place, which became the film 127 Hours based on his experience
- Doug Sharp, Olympic bobsled medalist
- Bill Sims, blues musician
- Frederick C. Smith, member of House of Representatives and physician
- Norman Thomas, famous socialist who ran for president six times unsuccessfully
- John Vornholt, author of Star Trek novels and screenwriter

== See also ==
- List of sundown towns in the United States
