= Edmund Vance Cooke =

American poet (1866–1932)

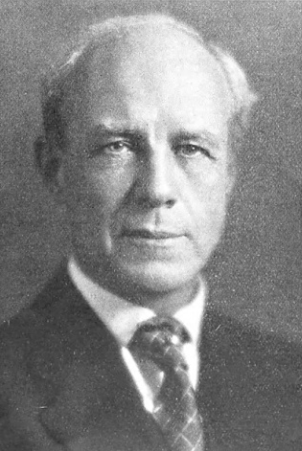
- Born: June 5, 1866; Port Dover, Canada West
- Died: December 18, 1932 (aged 66); Cleveland, Ohio
- Occupation: Poet
- Notable work: "How Did You Die?"
- Spouse: Lilith Castleberry (married 1898)
- Children: 5

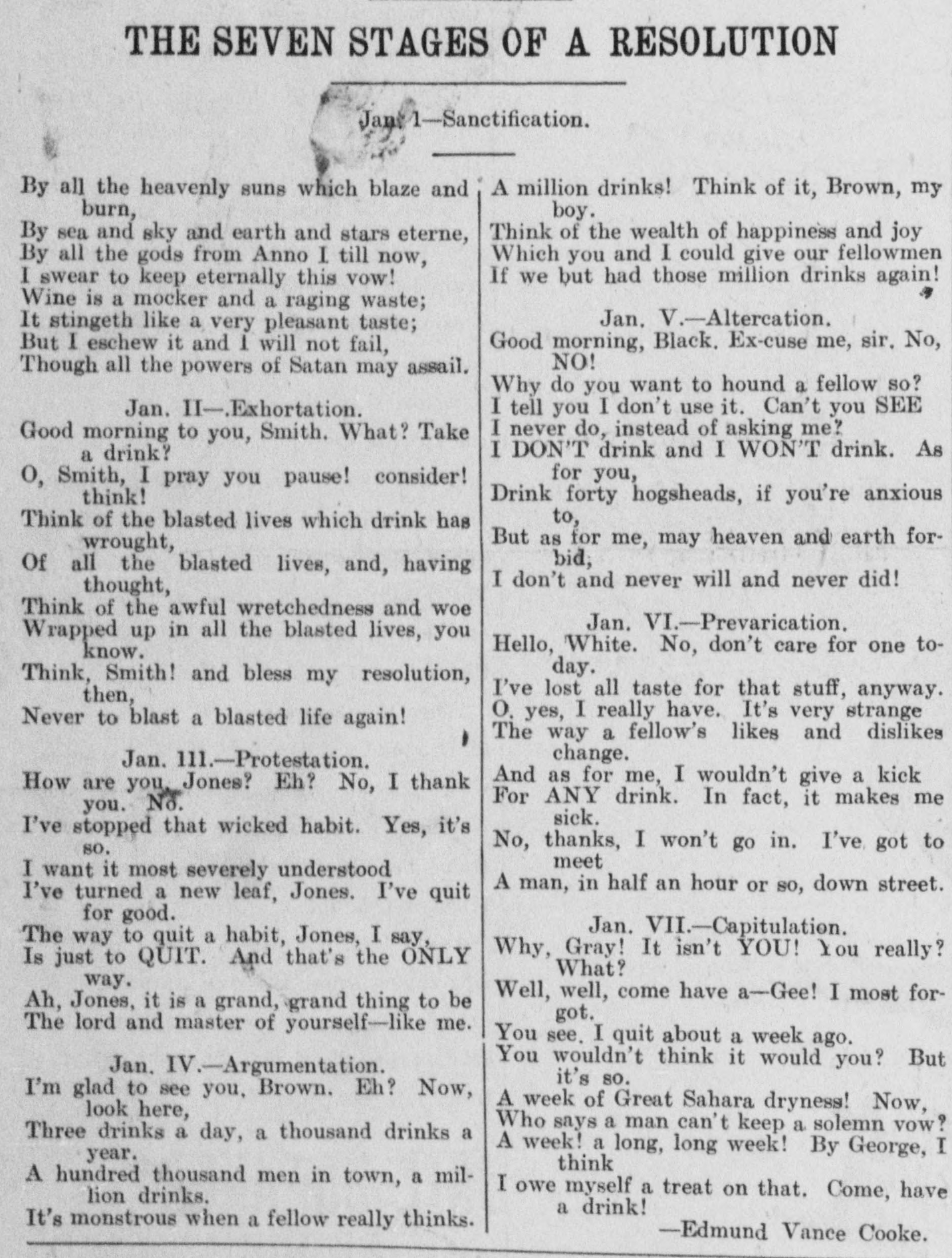
Resolutions published in The Tacoma Times of January 2, 1904

Edmund Vance Cooke (June 5, 1866 – December 18, 1932) was a 19th- and 20th-century poet best remembered for his inspirational verse "How Did You Die?"

Cooke was born in Port Dover, Canada West. In 1898, he married Lilith Castleberry, with whom he had five children. He later read his poems on radio station WWJ in Detroit, Michigan. He died in Cleveland, Ohio.

Cooke's poetry has been set to music by several composers, including Nellie Bangs Skelton and Kate Vanderpoel.

== Books ==
- A Patch of Pansies (1894)
- Impertinent Poems (1903)
- Rimes to be Read (1897)
- Chronicles of the Little Tot (1905)
- Told to the Little Tot (1906)
- A Morning's Mail (1907)
- Little Songs for Two (1909)
- I Rule the House (1910)
- Basebology (1912)
- The Story Club (1912)
- The Uncommon Commoner (1913)
- Just Then Something Happened (1914)
- Cheerful Children (1923)
- Brass Tacks Ballads (1924)
- Companionable Poems (1924)
- From the Book of Extenuations (1926)
