= 1839 Marion riot =

Anti-slavery riot in Marion, Ohio

In Marion, Ohio, in July 1839, William Mitchell (a.k.a. William Anderson) was seized by a group of men from Virginia, who alleged that he was an escaped slave. Mitchell, who had been living in Marion for at least a year, was placed on trial under Ohio's 1839 Fugitive Slave Act in the Court of Common Pleas, headed by Ozias Bowen. On August 27, in front of a packed courthouse, Bowen ruled against the Virginians and declared Mitchell to be free. After his ruling, the Virginians attempted to kidnap Mitchell. The crowd reacted in an effort to protect Mitchell, throwing projectiles at the Virginians while they were in the streets, and breaking into the town's armory and distributing weapons. Mitchell was soon freed and escaped to Canada.

== Background ==
Tensions between anti- and pro-slavery groups in Ohio came to a head with the February 1839 passage of the Ohio Fugitive Slave Act after sixteen years of deliberation, a law which created a process for the return of escaped slaves. The Kentucky General Assembly had sent two commissioners to the state who advocated for the law.

In the interest of remaining on good terms with Kentucky, most of Ohio's newspapers had spoken out in favor of the law, which had in turn coalesced abolitionist opposition. Some Ohio citizens were outraged and interpreted the law as permitting anyone from the south to take any Black person they wanted from the state. The act was so unpopular that public protests had forced its repeal by 1843. However, the law also held the potential to impede kidnapping efforts by establishing procedure for formal trial of accused fugitive slaves, including permitting them legal defense and up to sixty days to provide evidence. The fugitive slave law stirred up widespread resistance in the state and was never widely enforced.

== Riot ==
A free Black man, known as William “Bill” Mitchell, had lived in Marion since at least 1838. Historian David Grimsted writes that he had been there for a year, while the 1907 History of Marion County placed his arrival in fall 1838. Grimsted and historian Stanley Harrold describe Mitchell as a fugitive slave. The Marion Visitor described him as "well known by our citizens", having worked odd jobs as a butcher, barber, and fiddler. In mid-July 1839, several men from Virginia seized him, alleging that he had escaped enslavement under Adna Van Bibber living in Kanawha County, Virginia. He was arrested under the terms of the Ohio Fugitive Slave Act; the warrant was written by the town's justice of the peace, John Batram.

Mitchell was taken to the county jail to await a hearing before the Court of Common Pleas that would determine his fate. Ozias Bowen headed the court and his associate justices were Thomas J. Anderson and George Gray. Mitchell appeared in court on July 18, 1839, and Bowen granted him forty days to prove that he was, in fact, a free man. The Virginians presented what they described as an authentic bill of sale from Mr. John Lewis to Van Bibber relating to Mitchell.

=== Trial ===
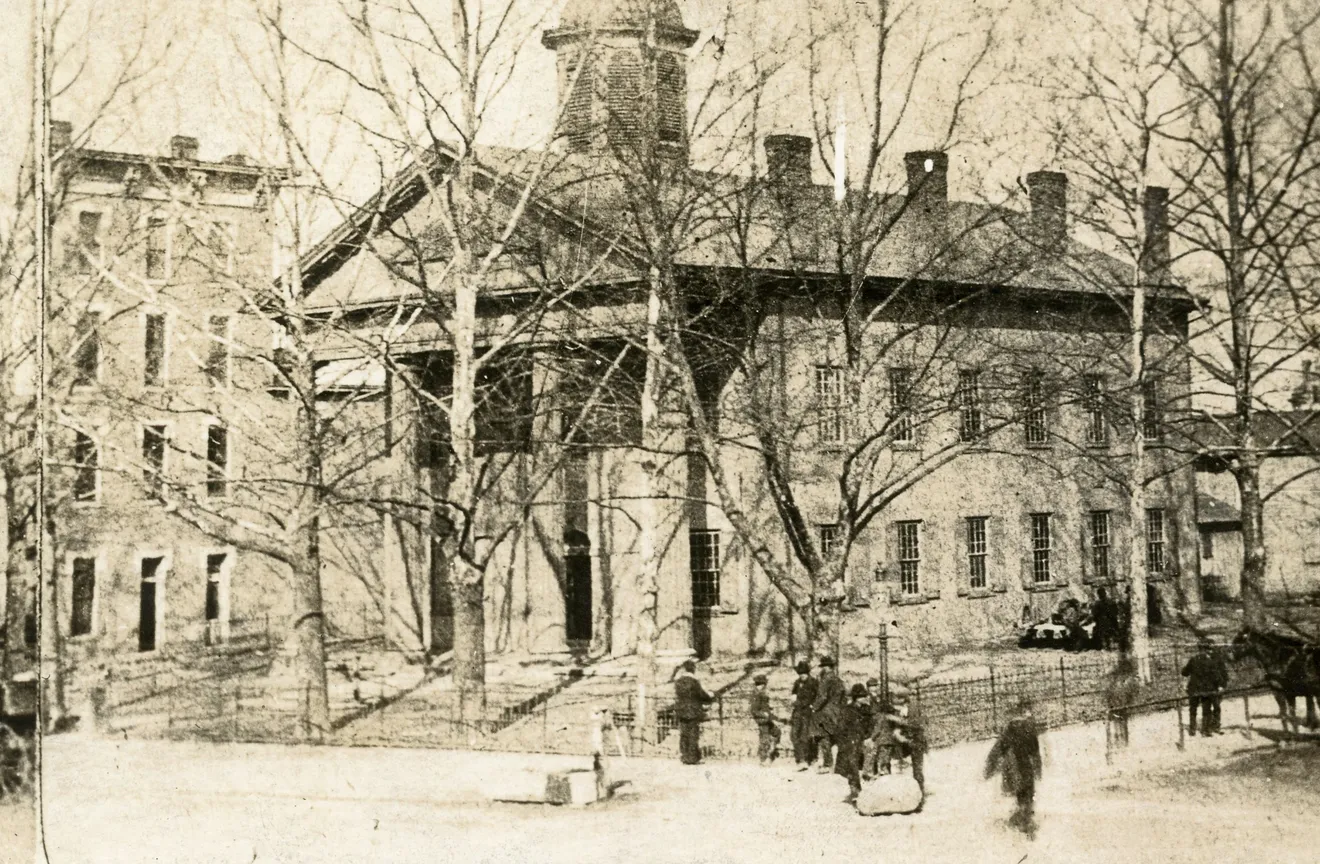
Marion, Ohio, courthouse (1833)

The case, Adnah Van Bibber vs. Mitchell (a colored man), was heard on August 26 to a full courtroom. Mitchell was defended by Cooper K. Watson, Marion County's prosecuting attorney, and James H. Goodman. In his memoirs, Justice Thomas J. Anderson described the case as putting the county in the greatest state of excitement in its history, writing that the courtroom was "crowded to suffocation." Throughout the day witnesses were questioned and lawyers on both sides spoke. The vast majority, if not all, of the witnesses spoke against Mitchell's claim of freedom. Mitchell himself was not allowed to testify.

Though arguments in the case were ended that day, the court did not read the decision until the following day; Harrold writes that this choice was to avoid unrest. Bowen did not begin until 10 in the morning and reportedly spent around forty minutes reading the decision, while the crowd remained calm. The court held that Mitchell was not owned by Van Bibber and had, in fact, been owned by John Lewis. and held the bill of sale to be fraudulent. While Bowen wrote that even upon "the most mature reflection" he was convinced that the decision was legally correct, Anderson later alleged that Bowen had reached the decision to free Mitchell before the trial was held.

=== Attempted kidnapping and aftermath ===
As soon as Bowen finished speaking, the eight Virginians who had claimed Mitchell was an escaped slave ran and took Mitchell by force. "Confusion, riot and disorder" broke out as most of the crowd leapt to Mitchell's defense. The Virginians used force to carry out their kidnapping; The Marion Visitor described the brandishing of "pistols, bowie knives, dirks" and threats made against the lives of whoever attempted to resist. The men from Virginia managed to escape the courthouse and forced Mitchell through the town's main street. The crowd began throwing assorted projectiles at the kidnappers, namely broken limestone from the main street, which had recently been re-done. The would-be kidnappers took refuge in the office of John Batram, the town justice, where they demanded a retrial. The mob congregated outside it. A newspaper account estimated the mob's size to be 200 people. The crowd remained even as the town sheriff attempted to disperse them and soon became more aggressive in their efforts to free Mitchell. The town arsenal was broken into and weapons were distributed among the mob.

Judge Anderson eventually forced his way through the barred doors, and, followed by others, broke Mitchell out of confinement. They fled, followed by two of the kidnappers who threatened Mitchell with force, but the kidnappers were beaten by the mob. Mitchell escaped in the ensuing confusion. According to an article published several weeks later, the arrested Virginians were placed in jail under a $600 bail, which they paid. After a trial on charges of contempt of court, they were fined $15, a cost that was remitted. Another grand jury indicted the Virginians on charges of rioting, but it is not clear what resulted from the charges.

Mitchell quickly left Marion, stopping at the home of Reuben Benedict before reaching Canada. American newspapers widely covered Marion's "abolitionist riot"; many criticized the actions of Bowen and Anderson. Abolitionist newspapers attacked the Virginians; for instance, the Ohio Philanthropist described their actions as "audacious", asking "what more will these slaveholders have? They demanded the Black Law, and it was passed; and now because in a single instance it works unfavorably to their claims, they denounce our citizens as mobocrats, charge our judges with corruption, and with brazen audacity justify the violation of the sanctity of our courts of justice." In early 1840 anti- and pro-abolitionist rallies were held in Marion.

== Later recognition ==
Historian David Grimsted, in his survey of mob-action events across the US, notes that, as in Marion, many mob rescues of slaves began with a group of people not in active opposition to slavery; yet, when it confronted them in a way they could not ignore, they were willing to act.

In the early 2000s, a two markers commemorating the event were erected in Marion, one in a rest stop along U.S. Route 23 and the other at the town's city hall. The city hall marker was renovated and rededicated in 2016.

== Bibliography ==
- Anderson, James House (1904). Life and Letters of Judge Thomas J. Anderson and Wife, Including a Few Letters from Children and Others; Mostly Written During the Civil War; a History. Press of F. J. Heer.
- Grimsted, David (1998). American Mobbing, 1828-1861: Toward Civil War. Oxford University Press. ISBN 978-0-19-535366-2.
- Harrold, Stanley (2010). Border War: Fighting over Slavery before the Civil War. Univ of North Carolina Press. ISBN 978-0-8078-9955-7.
- Hudson, J. Blaine (2015). Encyclopedia of the Underground Railroad. McFarland. ISBN 978-1-4766-0230-1.
- Jacoby, John Wilbur (1907). History of Marion County, Ohio, and Representative Citizens. Biographical Publishing Company.
- Preston, Emmett D. (1943). "The Fugitive Slave Acts in Ohio". The Journal of Negro History. 28 (4): 422–477. doi:10.2307/2714948. ISSN 0022-2992. JSTOR 2714948. S2CID 149832446.
