= James A. Beckel Jr. =

American composer and trombonist

- Born: James Arthur Beckel, Jr. July 16, 1948 (age 78); Marion, Ohio, U.S.
- Occupations: Composer, trombonist
- Years active: 1969–present
- Children: 2
- Website: jimbeckelmusic.com

James Arthur Beckel Jr. (born July 16, 1948) is a contemporary American composer and musician best known for his contemporary compositions as well as his association with the Indianapolis Symphony Orchestra, where he was principal trombonist from 1969 to 2018. His compositions have been performed and recorded by the Baltimore, Atlanta, Indianapolis Symphonies, Ft. Wayne Philharmonic, United States Air Force Band, the DC Air Force Orchestra, and many other nationally recognized orchestras throughout the United States.

Beckel is married, has two children, and is a member of the Carmel Brass Choir. Beckel maintains a trombone and euphonium studio at DePauw University in Greencastle, Indiana.

== Works list ==
Toccata for Orchestra
In the Mind's Eye
Glass Bead Game
Fantasy after Schubert
Liberty for All
American Dream
Gardens of Stone
A Christmas Fanfare
Symphony for Band
I Am the American Flag
Waltz of the Animals
Night Visions
Musica Mobilis
A Gospel Christmas
Inaugural Fanfare
Overture for a New Age
Make a Joyful Noise
Celebrations
Portraits
Musical Masque (for the Seasons)
Music for Winds, Piano, and Percussion
Imagination
Sonata for Trumpet and Organ
American Journey
String Quartet No. 1
Concerto for Tuba and Percussion
Lament for Two Trombones
Primitive Modern
Lost Dreams and Rainy Days
Three Sketches for Orchestra
Christmas Medley for Brass Septet
Amazing Grace
Freedom's Hope
The Long Dream
Intrada
They're Playing our Song
