= James W. Huffman =

American politician (1894–1980)

James Wylie Huffman
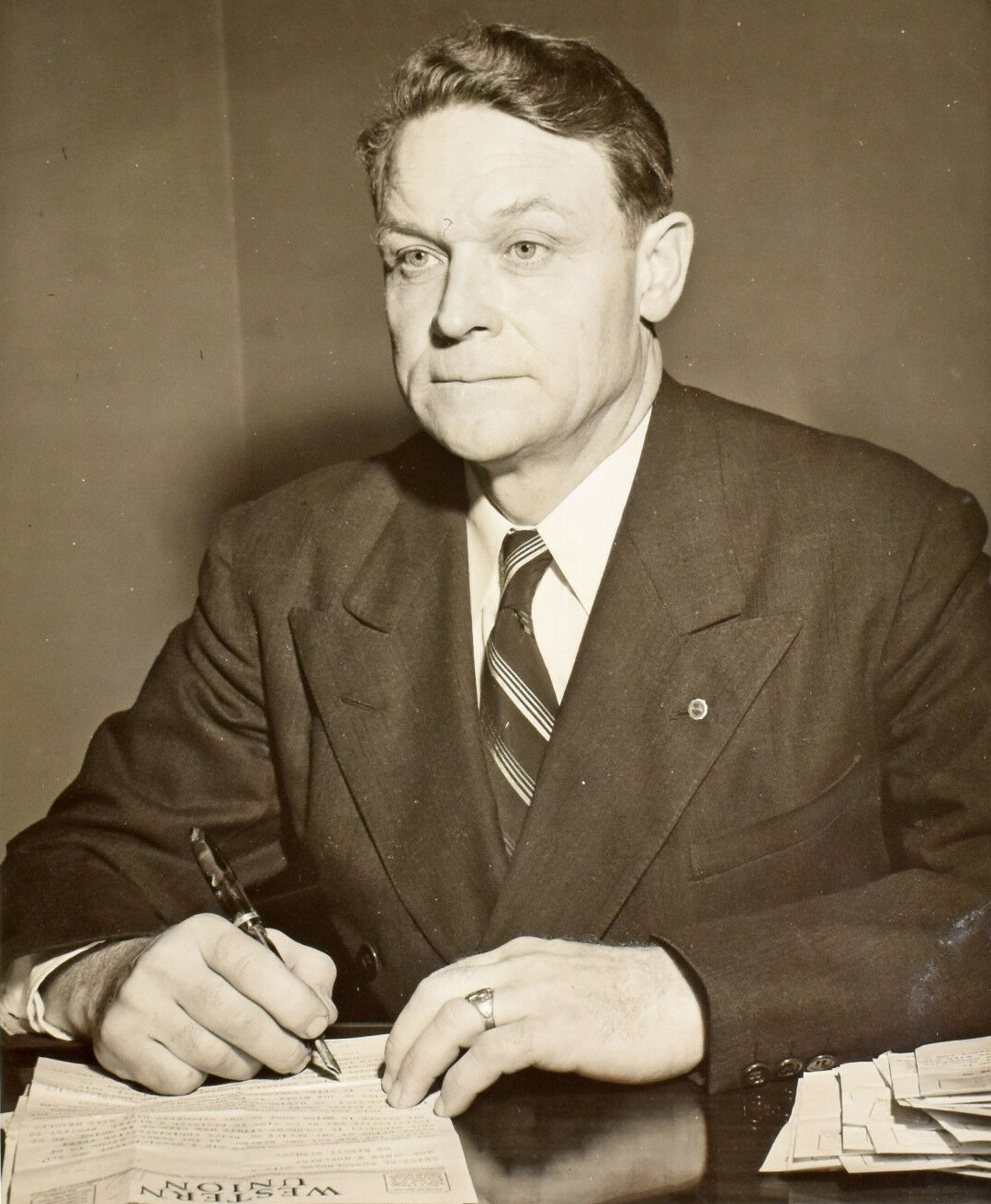
- Associated Press photo of Huffman shortly after he was appointed to the U.S. Senate

United States Senator from Ohio
- In office October 8, 1945 – November 5, 1946
- Appointed by: Frank Lausche
- Preceded by: Harold H. Burton
- Succeeded by: Kingsley A. Taft

Director of the Ohio Department of Commerce
- In office January 5, 1945 – October 7, 1945
- Appointed by: Frank Lausche
- Preceded by: Paul L. Selby
- Succeeded by: Robert L. Moulton

Member of the Public Utilities Commission of Ohio
- In office February 17, 1927 – February 1, 1929
- Appointed by: A. Victor Donahey
- Preceded by: Charles C. Marshall
- Succeeded by: Frank W. Geiger

Personal details
- Born: September 13, 1894 Chandlersville, Ohio
- Died: May 20, 1980 (aged 85) Pickerington, Ohio
- Resting place: Arlington National Cemetery
- Party: Democratic
- Spouse: Margaret Catherine Donahey (m. 1925-1958, her death)
- Education: University of Chicago Law School
- Profession: Attorney

Military service
- Allegiance: United States
- Branch/service: United States Army
- Years of service: 1917-1919
- Rank: First Lieutenant
- Unit: 329th Infantry Regiment; 120th Machine Gun Battalion
- Battles/wars: World War I Occupation of the Rhineland

James Wylie Huffman (September 13, 1894 – May 20, 1980) was an American lawyer and Democratic Party politician from Ohio. He represented Ohio in the United States Senate from 1945 until 1946.

== Early life ==
Huffman was born in Chandlersville, Ohio on September 13, 1894 and attended the schools of Rich Hill Township in Muskingum County as well as schools in Ashland County. He was a student at Ohio Wesleyan University and Ohio State University, then worked as a high school teacher and principal for three years.

== World War I ==
Huffman joined the United States Army for World War I. He completed officer training, received his commission as a second lieutenant, and was assigned as a machine gun officer for the 329th Infantry Regiment, a unit of the 83rd Division. He was subsequently assigned to the 120th Machine Gun Battalion, a unit of the 32nd Division. Huffman participated in four major American Expeditionary Forces offensives -- Aisne–Marne, Oise–Aisne, Meuse–Argonne, and Argonne Forest. In 1918, he was promoted to first lieutenant. After the Armistice of 11 November 1918 ended the war, Huffman remained in Germany for six months of occupation duty.

== Career ==
Huffman was discharged from the army in 1919 and attended the University of Chicago Law School, from which he graduated with an LL.B. degree in 1922. He was admitted to the bar in Illinois and practiced in Chicago. He carried out a temporary appointment as an assistant state attorney general in 1923, then decided to return to Ohio.

In 1925, Huffman married Margaret Catherine Donahey, the daughter of Governor A. Victor Donahey. Huffman served as Donahey's executive assistant during his governorship, and was a member of the state public utilities commission from 1927 to 1929. At the expiration of his term, Huffman began to practice law in Columbus. In 1944, Huffman ran unsuccessfully for the Democratic nomination for Ohio governor. He subsequently served as Ohio's director of commerce during the first term of Governor Frank Lausche.

== U.S. Senator ==
In 1945, Senator Harold Hitz Burton resigned in order to accept appointment to the United States Supreme Court. Lausche appointed Huffman to fill the vacancy and he served in the U.S. Senate from October 8, 1945 to November 5, 1946, when Kingsley A. Taft defeated him in the election to complete the remainder of the term. After leaving the Senate, Huffman resumed practicing law until 1957, when he became president of the Motorists Mutual Insurance Company. He later became president of a newly-formed subsidiary, Motorists Life Insurance Company.

== Death and burial ==
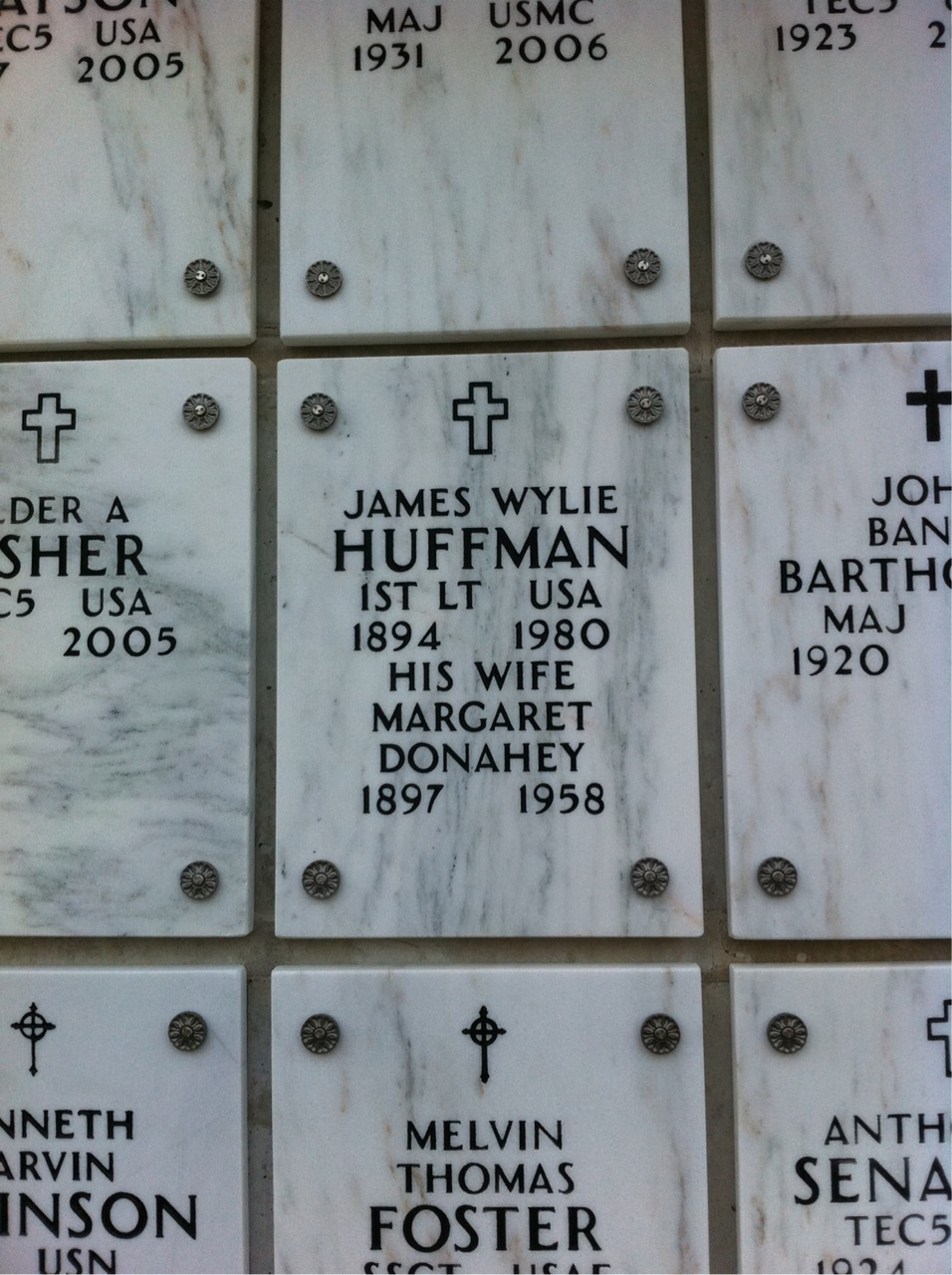
Huffman's niche at Arlington National Cemetery

Huffman died in Pickerington, Ohio on May 20, 1980. He was buried at Arlington National Cemetery.

== See also ==
- Ohio gubernatorial elections

Party political offices
Preceded by Henry P. Webber	Democratic nominee for U.S. Senator from Ohio (Class 1); 1946	Succeeded by Michael DiSalle
U.S. Senate
Preceded by Harold H. Burton	United States Senator (Class 1) from Ohio; 1945 - 1946	Succeeded by Kingsley A. Taft
