= Keith McNamara =

American politician (1928–2015)

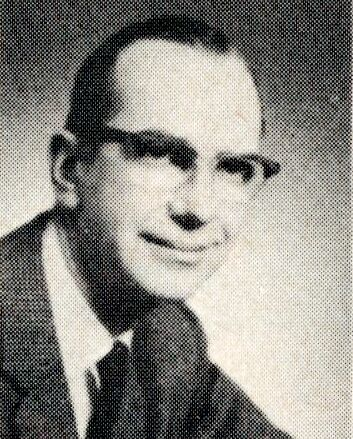

Member of the Ohio House of Representatives from the 64th district
- In office January 3, 1967 – December 31, 1972
- Preceded by: None (First)
- Succeeded by: William Kopp

Personal details
- Born: October 12, 1928 Sandusky, Ohio, U.S.
- Died: October 26, 2015 (aged 87)
- Party: Republican

Keith McNamara (October 12, 1928 – October 26, 2015) was an American politician in the state of Ohio.

He practiced law in Ohio for over 60 years. He served in the Ohio House of Representatives from 1967 to 1972. He managed the Ohio presidential campaigns of George H. W. Bush, who appointed McNamara to the board of directors of the State Justice Institute, on which he served from 1990 to 2010. He also served on the Franklin County Board of Elections from 1993 to 2003, and as chairman of the Ohio Liquor Control Commission from 2003 to 2007.
