= 1946 United States Senate elections in Ohio =

1946 United States Senate election in Ohio
- November 5, 1946
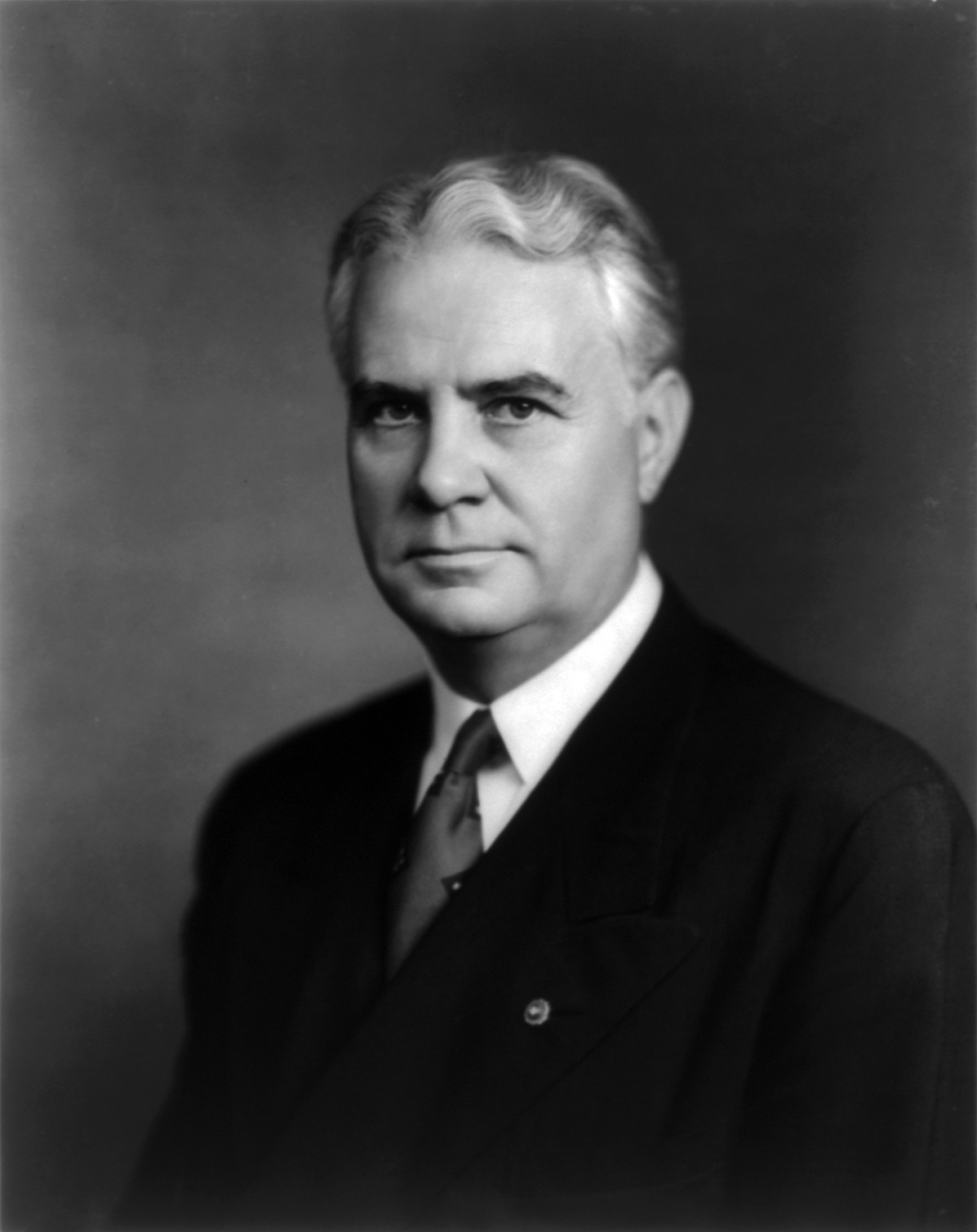

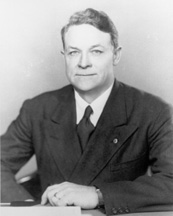
Nominee	John W. Bricker	James W. Huffman
Party	Republican	Democratic
Popular vote	1,275,774	947,610
Percentage	57.02%	42.36%
- County results Bricker: 50–60% 60–70% 70–80% Huffman: 50–60%
U.S. senator before election
James W. Huffman
Democratic
Elected U.S. Senator
John W. Bricker
Republican

The 1946 United States Senate elections in Ohio was held on November 5, 1946, alongside a concurrent special election to the same seat.

Former Republican Governor of Ohio and 1944 nominee for the U.S. vice presidency John W. Bricker defeated Democratic interim senator James W. Huffman, who had been appointed to fill the vacant seat left by Supreme Court Justice Harold Hitz Burton. In a concurrent special election to finish Burton's unexpired term, Republican Kingsley Taft defeated Henry P. Webber.

== Background ==
Incumbent Senator Harold Hitz Burton resigned from office in October 1945 to accept a seat on the United States Supreme Court. Governor Frank Lausche appointed James W. Huffman to fill Burton's vacant seat until a successor could be duly elected. The special election to fill the seat was scheduled for November 5, 1946, concurrent with the election to the next full term.

Huffman did not run in the special election, but ran in the election for the full term beginning in 1947.

== Democratic primary ==
=== Candidates ===
- Marvin C. Harrison, former State Senator from Cleveland and candidate for U.S. Senate in 1944
- James W. Huffman, interim appointee Senator and former Ohio Director of Commerce
- Edward A. Huth, University of Dayton professor of sociology
- Stephen M. Young, former U.S. Representative from Cleveland (representing Ohio at-large) (1933–37, 1941–43)

=== Results ===
1946 Democratic Senate primary
Party	Candidate	Votes	%
Democratic	James W. Huffman (incumbent)	108,329	38.58%
Democratic	Stephen M. Young	89,651	31.93%
Democratic	Marvin C. Harrison	70,697	25.18%
Democratic	Edward A. Huth	12,133	4.32%
Total votes		280,810	100.00%

== General election ==
=== Results ===
1946 U.S. Senate election in Ohio
Party	Candidate	Votes	%
Republican	John W. Bricker	1,275,774	57.02%
Democratic	James W. Huffman (incumbent)	947,610	42.36%
Socialist	William Farkas	13,885	0.62%
Total votes		2,237,269	100.00%
Republican gain from Democratic			

=== Special election ===
1946 U.S. Senate special election in Ohio
Party	Candidate	Votes	%
Republican	Kingsley Taft	1,193,852	56.22%
Democratic	Henry P. Webber	929,584	43.78%
Total votes		2,123,436	100.00%
Republican gain from Democratic			

== See also ==
- 1946 United States Senate elections
