= Robert M. Sohngen =

American judge

Robert Mason Sohngen

Justice of the Ohio Supreme Court
- In office January 9, 1947 – December 31, 1948
- Appointed by: Frank Lausche
- Preceded by: Roy Hughes Williams
- Succeeded by: Kingsley A. Taft

Personal details
- Born: July 16, 1887 Hamilton, Ohio
- Died: June 4, 1953 (aged 65) Hamilton, Ohio
- Resting place: Greenwood Cemetery (Hamilton, Ohio)
- Party: Democratic
- Spouse: Helen Ray Simpson
- Education: Cornell University Law School

Military service
- Allegiance: United States
- Branch/service: United States Army
- Years of service: 1917–1918
- Rank: Captain
- Battles/wars: World War I

Robert Mason Sohngen (July 16, 1887 – June 4, 1953) was a lawyer from Hamilton, Ohio, who was a justice of the Supreme Court of Ohio 1947–1948, as well as serving in other local, state and federal positions.

== Biography ==
Robert M. Sohngen was born July 16, 1887, in Hamilton, Ohio, to Charles E. and Anna Mason Sohngen. He graduated in 1908 from Cornell University Law School, travelled in Europe for a year, and worked for Williams Shoe Company in Cincinnati for five years beginning in 1909.

In 1915, Sohngen was admitted to the Ohio bar, and formed the firm of Williams & Sohngen in Hamilton. He was also elected to the Hamilton Board of Education that year, and re-elected in 1919. He was board president for four years. He enlisted in the United States Army on August 27, 1917, during World War I. He was assigned to Officer's Training School at Fort Harrison, Indiana. He was commissioned first lieutenant on November 27, 1917, and assigned to Camp Sherman in Chillicothe in the 158th Brigade. He was Camp Judge Advocate and Camp Intelligence Officer. He was promoted to Captain on July 10, 1918, and acquired the nickname "Cappy". He was discharged December 20, 1918.

Sohngen was elected Hamilton city solicitor in 1922, and served until 1923. He was Chairman of the Butler County Democratic Executive Committee several times in the 1920s and 1930s. He was appointed state counsel for the Home Owners' Loan Corporation in 1933, and served until resigning February 1935 to return to private practice in Hamilton. From 1939 to 1944, he was a member of the Ohio Bar Examining Committee. Ohio Governor Frank Lausche appointed him director of the Ohio Department of Liquor Control on January 13, 1945.

Roy Hughes Williams of the Supreme Court of Ohio died December 18, 1946. Governor Lausche appointed Sohngen to the court on January 4, 1947, and he took office January 9, 1947. Williams unexpired term ended December 31, 1948. Sohngen ran for a six-year term in November, 1948, but was defeated by Kingsley A. Taft.

After his term on the high court ended, Sohngen returned to the firm he founded, then called Sohngen, Parrish, Beeler and Egbert.

Sohngen died at Mercy Hospital in Hamilton on June 4, 1953. He is buried at Greenwood Cemetery. Sohngen married Helen Ray Simpson on March 30, 1910. They had no children.
