= Ralph G. Neppel =

Medal of Honor recipient

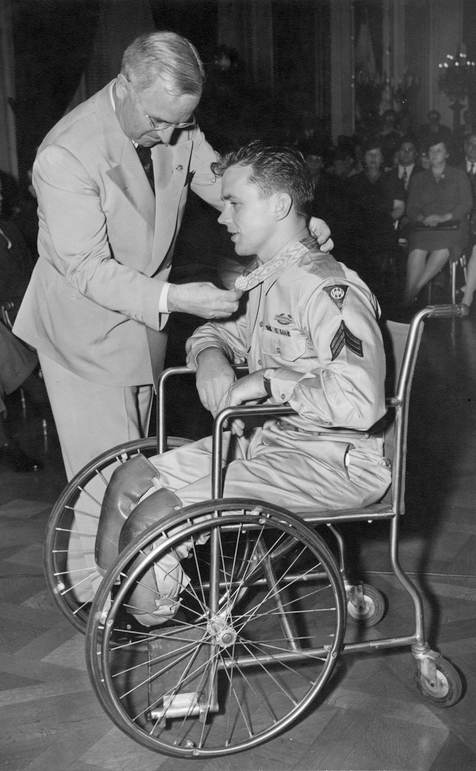
- Neppel receives the Medal of Honor from President Harry S. Truman (August 23, 1945)
- Born: October 31, 1923; Willey, Iowa, U.S.
- Died: January 27, 1987 (aged 63); Lidderdale, Iowa, U.S.
- Burial place: Holy Family Cemetery, Lidderdale, Iowa
- Military career
- Allegiance: United States
- Branch: United States Army
- Service years: 1943–1946
- Rank: Technical Sergeant
- Units: 329th Infantry Regiment, 83rd Infantry Division
- Conflicts: World War II
- Awards: Medal of Honor

Ralph George Neppel (October 31, 1923 – January 27, 1987) was a United States Army soldier and a recipient of the United States military's highest decoration, the Medal of Honor, for his actions in World War II shortly before the Battle of the Bulge.

== Biography ==
Neppel, living in Glidden, Iowa, was inducted into the Army at Camp Dodge, Iowa, in March 1943. By December 14, 1944, he was serving as a sergeant in Company M, 329th Infantry Regiment, 83rd Infantry Division. During a German counterattack on that day, at Birgel, Germany, one of his legs was severed by enemy fire. He continued to operate his machine gun until the German force withdrew. Neppel survived his wounds, although his remaining leg was badly damaged and had to be amputated. On August 23, 1945, he was awarded the Medal of Honor by President Harry S. Truman in a White House ceremony.

During his recovery and rehabilitation at McCloskey General Hospital in Temple, Texas, Neppel was fitted with prostheses and was promoted from sergeant to technical sergeant. He married his fiancée Jean Moore, and was discharged from the Army in 1946.

Neppel returned to work at his 240-acre Iowa farm. He earned a bachelor's degree from Buena Vista University and attended graduate school at Drake University, and worked for the Veterans Administration for 22 years. He served for eight years on the Iowa Governor's Committee for the Employment of the Handicapped, and in 1969 he was a finalist for the President's award for Handicapped Person of the Year.

Neppel died in 1987 at age 63 in an Iowa City, Iowa hospital after a short illness and was buried in Holy Family Cemetery, in Lidderdale, Iowa. He was survived by his wife, two sons, two daughters, two brothers, three sisters, and three grandsons. He was predeceased by his parents and one brother.

== Medal of Honor citation ==
Sergeant Neppel's official Medal of Honor citation reads as follows:

He was leader of a machinegun squad defending an approach to the village of Birgel, Germany, on 14 December 1944, when an enemy tank, supported by 20 infantrymen, counterattacked. He held his fire until the Germans were within 100 yards and then raked the foot soldiers beside the tank killing several of them. The enemy armor continued to press forward and, at the pointblank range of 30 yards, fired a high-velocity shell into the American emplacement, wounding the entire squad. Sgt. Neppel, blown 10 yards from his gun, had 1 leg severed below the knee and suffered other wounds. Despite his injuries and the danger from the onrushing tank and infantry, he dragged himself back to his position on his elbows, remounted his gun and killed the remaining enemy riflemen. Stripped of its infantry protection, the tank was forced to withdraw. By his superb courage and indomitable fighting spirit, Sgt. Neppel inflicted heavy casualties on the enemy and broke a determined counterattack.

== Awards and decorations ==

Badge	Combat Infantryman Badge		
1st row	Medal of Honor		
2nd row	Bronze Star Medal	Purple Heart with 1 Oak leaf cluster	Army Good Conduct Medal
3rd row	American Campaign Medal	European–African–Middle Eastern Campaign Medal with 3 Campaign stars	World War II Victory Medal

== See also ==
- List of Medal of Honor recipients
- List of Medal of Honor recipients for World War II
