= William Kopp =

William Kopp may refer to:

- William Kopp (Ohio politician), former member of the Ohio House of Representatives
- William F. Kopp (1869–1938), Republican U.S. Representative from Iowa
- Bill Kopp, American voice actor and animator
