= Les Brown (politician) =

American politician and motivational speaker

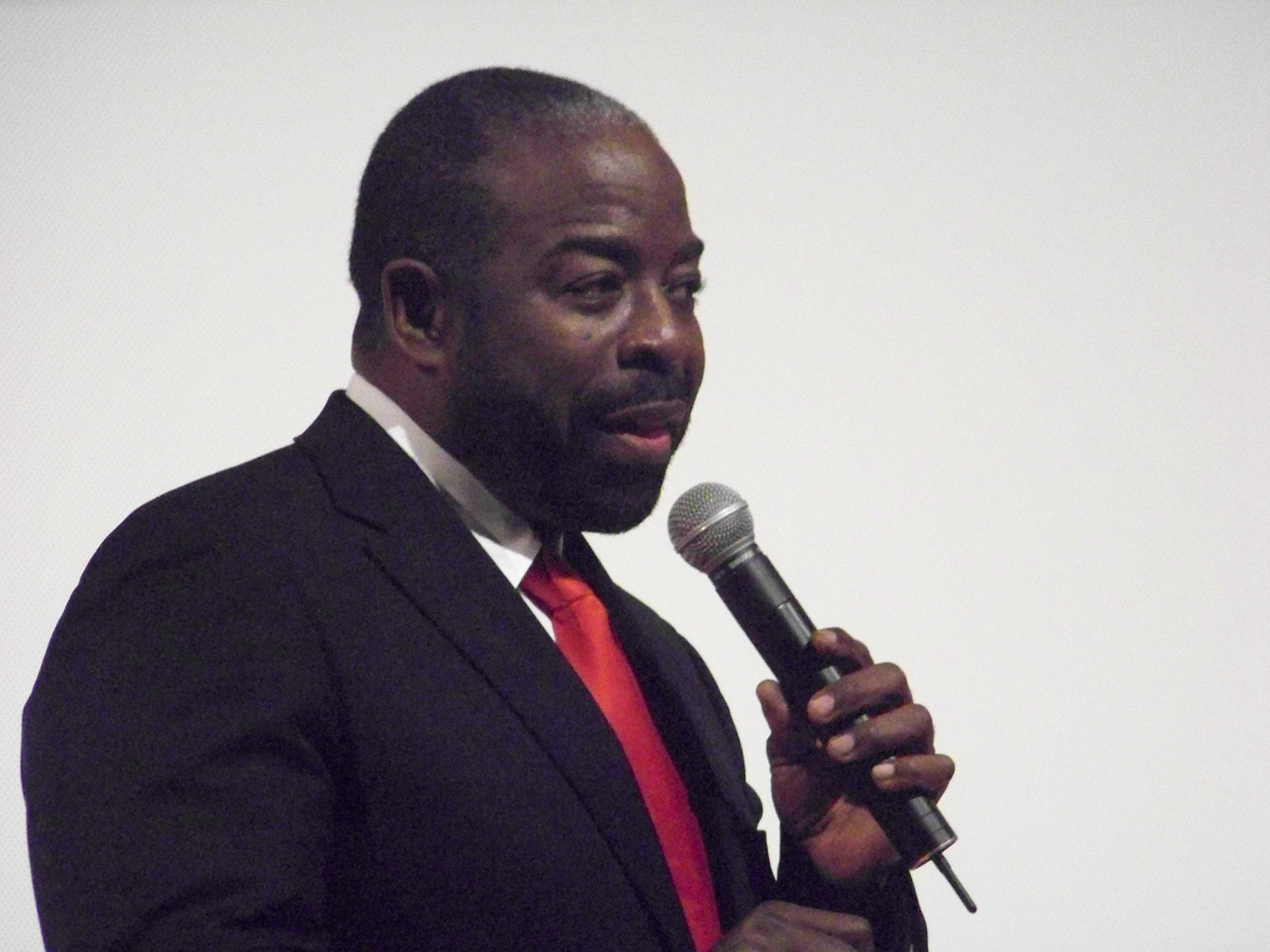
- Brown in 2009

Member of the Ohio House of Representatives from the 29th district
- In office January 3, 1977 – January 3, 1983
- Preceded by: William Kopp
- Succeeded by: Ray Miller

Personal details
- Born: Leslie Calvin Brown; February 17, 1945 (age 81) Miami, Florida, U.S.
- Party: Democratic
- Spouse: Gladys Knight (m. 1995; div. 1997)
- Occupation: Politician, motivational speaker
- Website: lesbrown.com

Leslie Calvin Brown (born February 17, 1945) is an American politician and motivational speaker who served as a member of the Ohio House of Representatives from 1977 to 1981.

== Early life ==
Brown was born with his twin brother, Wesley, in Liberty City, a low-income section of Miami, Florida. He was adopted by Mamie Brown, a 38-year-old single woman who worked as a cafeteria attendant and domestic assistant. Brown claims that he was declared "educable mentally retarded" in grade school, which damaged his self-esteem and confidence.

== Professional life ==
According to many of Brown's speeches, when he first decided to get his life into order, he went to a radio station he was repeatedly unsuccessful with his speeches. It was only after the on-air failures of the previous afternoon DJ that he was hired full-time. Upon his termination from the radio station, he ran for election in the Ohio House of Representatives and won. After leaving the Ohio State Legislature, he shifted his career to television and became a host on PBS.

From September to November 1993, he hosted a talk show, The Les Brown Show.

Brown was on KFWB in California for a daily syndicated radio program from 2011 to 2012.

=== Publications ===
- Live Your Dreams (1992), a motivational self-help book encouraging personal achievement and goal setting.

== Personal life ==
Brown married Gladys Knight in 1995. They divorced in 1997.
