= Arter & Hadden =

Law Firm

- Headquarters: Cleveland, Ohio
- Major practice areas: General Practice
- Date founded: 1843
- Founder: George Willey; John Cary
- Company type: Limited liability partnership
- Dissolved: July 15, 2003

Arter & Hadden LLP was a Cleveland-based law firm, founded in 1843 and dissolved on July 15, 2003, making it one of the oldest U.S. legal partnerships at the time. The firm had engaged in an ambitious expansion throughout the 1990s, peaking in 1999 with a total of 425 attorneys employed by the firm. Additionally, Arter and Hadden had offices across Ohio, Washington, DC, Texas, and California. Through acquisitions and mergers, they also opened offices in San Francisco and San Diego, California.

== Financial woes ==
By the year 2000, the firm had begun to lose senior partners. In Arter & Hadden's DC office, for instance, the number of attorneys on staff had steadily declined from 87 in 1998 down to only 15 attorneys in 2003. And with the sharp declines in staff, Arter and Hadden was still locked into leasing enough office space to accommodate the 425 attorneys the firm once had in 1999. Overhead costs began to soak up the firm's liquidity, and by the beginning of July 2003, it was revealed to the press that Arter and Hadden only had enough capital left to continue operations until July 15, 2003.

== Closure ==
In a statement to all employees of Arter & Hadden just weeks before its ultimate demise, the firm announced all employment would be terminated July 15, 2003, and the firm would cease all operations. Senior partners and the firm's executive committee attempted to find ways to keep the firm afloat but all ideas eventually failed.

Private investment company Oak Point Partners acquired the remnant assets, consisting of any known and unknown assets that weren't previously administered, from the Arter & Hadden, LLP Bankruptcy Estate on November 20, 2017.

== Bankruptcy settlement ==
After the firm closed its doors in July 2003, the estate of the firm appointed Marc Gertz as its trustee. Gertz conducted an independent investigation into the closing of the firm. Gertz found in the final years of Arter and Hadden, partners had acted inappropriately by conspiring together to form a new legal partnership while still being employed by Arter & Hadden, and deciding to give themselves year-end bonuses (despite knowing the firm's uncertain financial standing). The firm's estate reached a settlement with more than 80 former partners of Arter and Hadden, who agreed to pay the estate nearly $11 million. The firm's estate also reached settlements with many of Arter and Hadden's creditors—including JP Morgan, Huntington Bank, and Compass Bank.

== Successor law firms ==
Many of the former Arter & Hadden partners went on to form their own law firms after Arter & Hadden's closure. The Cleveland-based Tucker Ellis LLP was formed by many former partners in Arter and Hadden's Cleveland office. Also, the Columbus-based Bailey Cavalieri LLC was formed by former Arter & Hadden partners.

== Notable people ==
- Ann Womer Benjamin, former director of the Ohio Insurance Department, former member of the Ohio House of Representatives, and 2002 congressional candidate
- Mark McCormack, former attorney at Arter & Hadden's Cleveland office, founder and chairman of International Management Group
- Kingsley A. Taft, former Arter & Hadden partner, U.S. senator and chief justice of the Ohio Supreme Court
