= Frederick L. Taft =

American judge and lawyer (1870–1913)

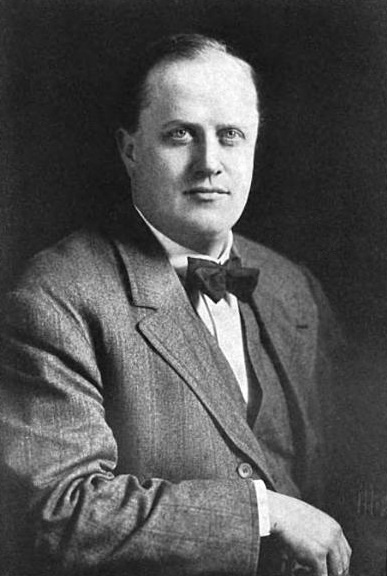
- Frederick L. Taft in 1910
- Born: Frederick Lovett Taft; December 1, 1870; Braceville Township, Ohio, US
- Died: April 7, 1913 (aged 42); Cleveland, Ohio, US
- Occupations: Lawyer and judge
- Known for: Judge, Ohio Courts of Common Pleas

Frederick Lovett Taft (December 1, 1870 – April 7, 1913) was an American lawyer and judge in Ohio. A member of the Taft family and a distant relative of President William Howard Taft, he was one of the leading political and legal men of the city of Cleveland and the state of Ohio from 1896 until his death in April 1913.

== Early life ==
Frederick L. Taft was born on December 1, 1870 in Bracewill, Ohio. His parenets were Laura Alba (née Humphrey) and Newton A. Taft, a farmer. His paternal great-great-grandfather Lovett Taft and his paternal great-great-great-grandfather Robert Taft fought in the American Revolutionary War. He was also related to President William Howard Taft. His maternal great-great-grandfather Moses Ashley also fought in the same war. His great-uncle was Matthew Birchard, an Ohio Supreme Court judge from 1842 to 1849.

Taft attended the public schools in Newton Falls, Ohio, graduating from high school in 1886. He then attended Mount Union College in Alliance, Ohio, and graduated with a bachelor's degree in 1889. He briefly taught public school, then in 1889 began attending Cincinnati Law School. He received his JD degree in 1891, was admitted to the Ohio State Bar on December 1, 1891,

== Career ==
Taft set up a private practice Cleveland. He served as assistant city solicitor from May 1898 to October 1, 1901, at which time he returned to private practice and joined the firm of Smith, Taft & Arter.

Upon the retirement of Judge Duane H. Tilden, Taft was appointed a judge on the Ohio Courts of Common Pleas by Ohio Governor Andrew L. Harris about September 1906. The following month, the Republican State Convention unanimously nominated him for a full term on the bench. Despite receiving several thousand more votes than the Republican running for another open seat on the court, Taft still lost to his Democratic opponent.

Taft was a leader in the Ohio State Bar Association. He served as the president of the Ohio State Bar Association from the 1912–1913 term. Taft returned to the firm of Smith, Taft & Arter. The firm was planning to open new, larger offices in April. Taft took possession of his new law office on April 7, and within an hour of doing so was stricken with a stroke

=== Politics ===
Taft was considered an important player in Republican politics at both the state and local level. Just five years after graduating from law school, Taft was appointed chairman of the Republican committee for Ohio's 21st congressional district. The following year, he was appointed chairman of the Cleveland city Republican committee and the Cuyahoga County Republican committee. In 1900, Taft was elected to the central committee of the Ohio State Republican Party.

Taft was chosen to be a delegate several times to city, county, and state Republican conventions in Ohio. He was so respected that he was appointed chairman of these conventions many times. Specific examples include the conventions of the Cleveland Republican Party in 1906 and 1907. He was also elected a delegate to the Republican National Convention of 1908.

== Personal life ==
Taft married Mary Alice Arter, daughter of his law partner, Frank A. Arter, on October 28, 1901. The couple had four children: Kingsley Arter (born 1903), Charles Newton (born 1904), Frederick Lovett, Jr. (1906), and Laura Emily (1909).

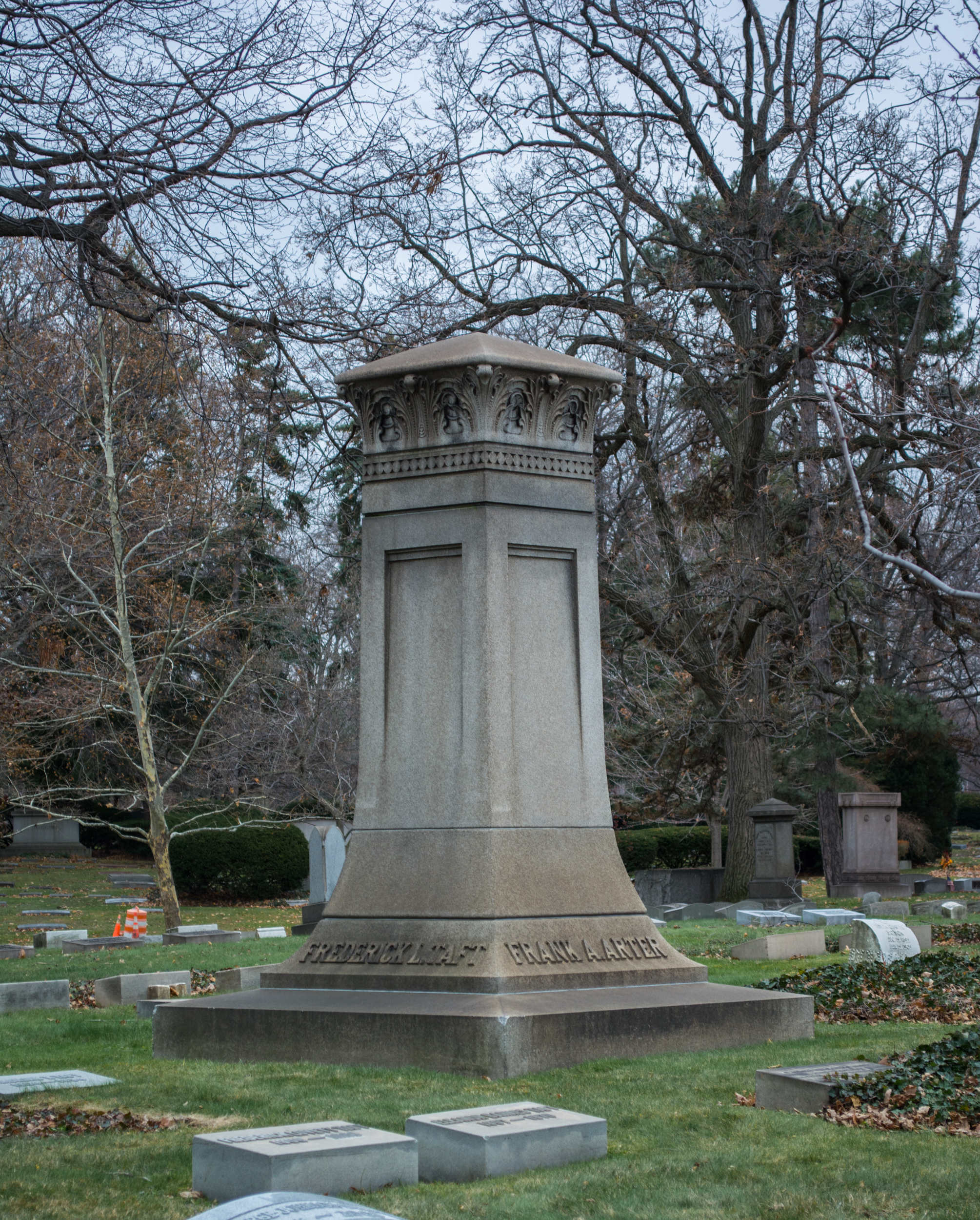
Grave of Frederick L. Taft in Lake View Cemetery in Cleveland, Ohio.

Taft was highly active in a wide range of civic, personal, and business organizations. He belonged to two fraternities, Sigma Alpha Epsilon and Phi Delta Phi (a fraternity for law students). He was a member of many social clubs, including the Cleveland Athletic Club, Columbus Club (Columbus, Ohio), Knights of Pythias, Sons of the American Revolution, Sons of Union Veterans of the Civil War, and Union Club (Cleveland). He also belonged to the Cleveland Chamber of Commerce and was a trustee of Mount Union College.

A 32nd-degree Freemason, he was also a member of the Ancient Arabic Order of the Nobles of the Mystic Shrine and the Knights Templar. Taft was a member of the First Methodist Episcopal Church of Cleveland.

Taft was unwell for the first several months of 1913. On April 7, he had a stroke. He was rushed to his home in Cleveland, where he died a few hours later. He was buried at Lake View Cemetery in Cleveland, Ohio.
