= William Kopp (Ohio politician) =

American politician

Member of the Ohio House of Representatives from the 29th district
- In office January 3, 1973 – December 31, 1976
- Preceded by: Keith McNamara
- Succeeded by: Leslie Brown

Personal details
- Party: Democratic

William Kopp is a former member of the Ohio House of Representatives.
