= 83rd Infantry Division (United States) =

83rd USAR Readiness Training Center (USARRTC) 83rd Infantry Division
- 83rd Infantry Division shoulder sleeve insignia
- Active: 5 August 1917–8 October 1919 (National Army); 24 June 1921–27 March 1946 Organized Reserves); 1 October 1946–31 December 1965 (Army Reserve); 22 April 1967–March 15, 1996 (83rd ARCOM); 27 November 2013–present (83rd USARRTC)
- Country: United States of America
- Branch: United States Army Reserve
- Type: Training; Infantry
- Size: Center; Division
- Part of: 100th Training Division
- Garrison/HQ: Fort Knox, Kentucky, U.S.
- Nicknames: "Thunderbolt" (special designation) "Ohio Division"; The Rag-Tag-Circus
- Motto: Fulge (Latin: Shine)
- Engagements: World War I; World War II; Normandy; Northern France; Rhineland; Ardennes-Alsace; Central Europe

Commanders
- Commander: COL Joseph L. Thomas, Jr. (since June 29, 2021)

Insignia
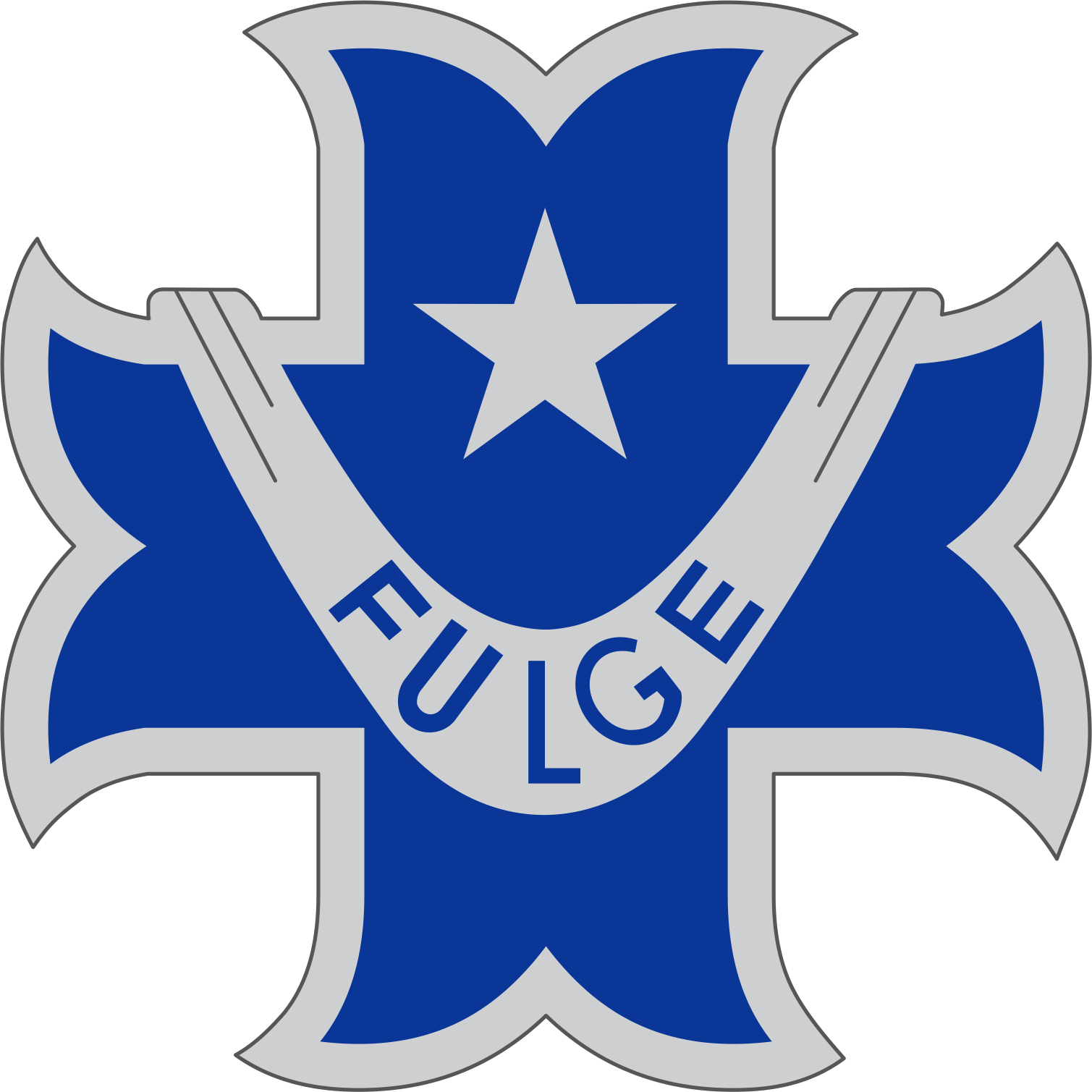
- 83rd USAR Readiness Training Center DUI

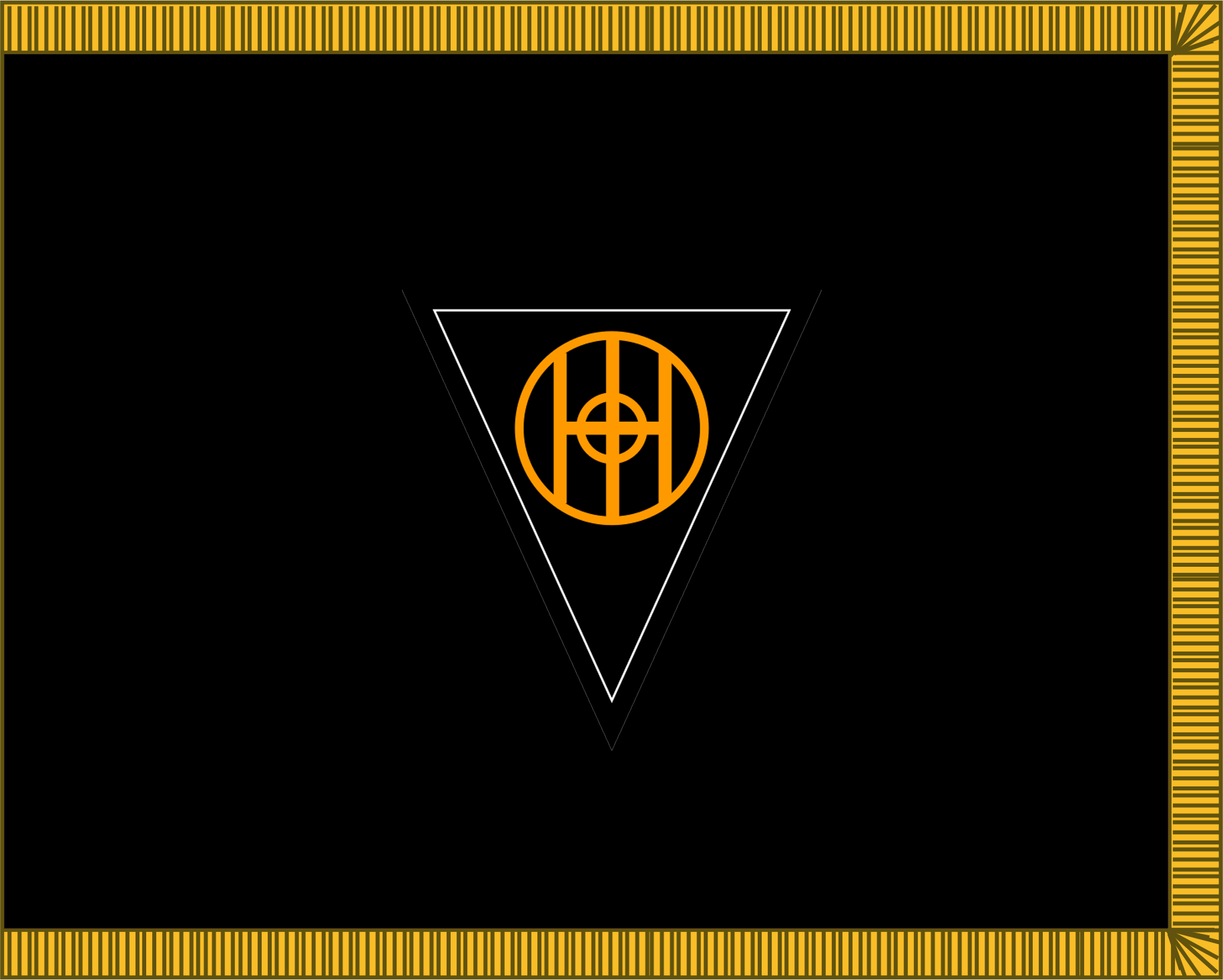
- 83rd USAR Readiness Training Center flag

The 83rd Infantry Division ("Thunderbolt") was a formation of the United States Army in World War I and World War II. Since 2014 the division's descendant is the 83rd United States Army Reserve Readiness Training Center (83rd USARRTC), United States Army Reserve, at Fort Knox, Kentucky.

== History ==
=== World War I ===
The division was activated in September 1917 at Camp Sherman, Ohio. It was initially made up of enlisted draftees from Ohio and Pennsylvania, with a cadre of Regular Army, Officers Reserve Corps, and National Army officers. Later groups of enlisted men assigned to the division to replace men transferred to other units came from Kentucky, Ohio, and Pennsylvania. The division went overseas in June 1918, and was designated as the 2nd Depot Division. It supplied over 195,000 officers and enlisted men as replacements to other units in France without seeing action as a complete formation. Certain divisional units saw action, such as the 332nd Infantry Regiment, in Italy (Battle of Vittorio Veneto). Its commanders were Maj. Gen. Edwin F. Glenn (25 August 1917), Brig. Gen. Frederick Perkins (13 January 1918), Brig. Gen. Willard A. Holbrook (23 March 1918), and finally Maj. Gen. Edwin F. Glenn (3 April 1918). It was demobilized in October 1919.

==== Order of battle ====
- Headquarters, 83rd Division
- 165th Infantry Brigade
  - 329th Infantry Regiment
  - 330th Infantry Regiment
  - 323rd Machine Gun Battalion
- 166th Infantry Brigade
  - 331st Infantry Regiment
  - 332nd Infantry Regiment
  - 324th Machine Gun Battalion
- 158th Field Artillery Brigade
  - 322nd Field Artillery Regiment (75 mm)
  - 323rd Field Artillery Regiment (75 mm)
  - 324th Field Artillery Regiment (155 mm)
  - 308th Trench Mortar Battery
- 322nd Machine Gun Battalion
- 308th Engineer Regiment
- 308th Field Signal Battalion
- Headquarters Troop, 83rd Division
- 308th Train Headquarters and Military Police
  - 308th Ammunition Train
  - 308th Supply Train
  - 308th Engineer Train
  - 308th Sanitary Train
    - 329th, 330th, 331st, and 332nd Ambulance Companies and Field Hospitals

==== Division insignia ====
The shoulder sleeve insignia of the 83rd Division consists of overlapped gold letters spelling out the word "O-H-I-O" on a background of a black isosceles triangle. The insignia was selected during World War I because the division originally contained mostly Ohio draftees.

=== Interwar period ===
The 83rd Division headquarters arrived at the port of Hoboken, New Jersey, aboard the USS George Washington on 21 January 1919 after 8 months of overseas service and was demobilized on 8 October 1919 at Camp Sherman, Ohio. It was reconstituted in the Organized Reserve on 24 June 1921, allotted to the Fifth Corps Area, and assigned to the XV Corps. The division was further allotted to the state of Ohio as its home area. The division headquarters was organized on 27 September 1921 at Columbus Barracks (redesignated Fort Hayes in 1922) in Columbus, Ohio, and remained there until activated for World War II. To maintain communications with the officers of the division, the division staff published the “83rd Division Bulletin,” which was renamed “The Ohioan” by 1926. The newsletter informed the division's members of such things as when and where the inactive training sessions were to be held, what the division's summer training quotas were, where the camps were to be held, and which units would be assigned to help conduct the Citizens Military Training Camps (CMTC).

The 83rd Division headquarters occasionally trained with the staff of the 5th Division's 10th Infantry Brigade at Fort Benjamin Harrison, Indiana. The subordinate infantry regiments of the division held their summer training primarily with the units of the 10th Infantry Brigade at Camp Knox and Fort Thomas, Kentucky, or Fort Benjamin Harrison. Other units, such as the special troops, artillery, engineers, aviation, medical, and quartermaster, trained at various posts in the Fifth Corps Area, usually with active units of the 5th Division. For example, the division's artillery trained with the 5th Division field artillery units stationed at Camp Knox; the 308th Engineer Regiment usually trained at Fort Benjamin Harrison; the 308th Medical Regiment trained at Camp Knox; and the 308th Observation Squadron trained with the 88th Observation Squadron at Wright Field, Ohio. In addition to the unit training camps, the infantry regiments of the division rotated responsibility for conducting the infantry CMTC held at Camp Knox and Fort Thomas each year.

On a number of occasions, the division participated in Fifth Corps Area or Second Army command post exercises (CPXs) in conjunction with other Regular Army units. These training events gave division staff officers opportunities to practice the roles they would be expected to perform in the event the division was mobilized. Unlike the Regular and Guard units in the First Corps Area, the 83rd Division did not participate in the various Fifth Corps Area maneuvers and the Second Army maneuvers of 1936, 1940, and 1941 as an organized unit due to lack of enlisted personnel and equipment. Instead, the officers and a few enlisted reservists were assigned to Regular and Guard units to fill vacant slots and bring the units up to war strength for the exercises. Additionally, some officers were assigned duties as umpires or as support personnel.

=== World War II ===
- Ordered into active military service: 15 August 1942 at Camp Atterbury, Indiana
- Overseas: 6 April 1944
- Campaigns: Normandy, Northern France, Rhineland, Ardennes-Alsace, Central Europe
- Days of combat: 244
- Distinguished Unit Citations: 7
- Awards: Medal of Honor-1; Distinguished Service Cross-7; Distinguished Service Medal-1; Silver Star-710; Legion of Merit-11; Soldier's Medal-25; Bronze Star-6,294; Air Medal-110
- Commanders: Maj. Gen. Frank W. Milburn (August 1942 – December 1943), Maj. Gen. Robert C. Macon (January 1944 – 31 January 1946)
- Assistant Division Commanders: Brig. Gen. William C. McMahon (August 1942 - December 1942), Brig. Gen. Claude B. Ferenbaugh (January 1944 - May 1945)
- Commanding Officers Artillery: Brig. Gen. Robert M. Montague (August 1942 - February 1946)
- Returned to U.S.: 26 March 1946
- Inactivated: 5 April 1946, Camp Kilmer, New Jersey

==== Mobilization ====
Before Organized Reserve infantry divisions were ordered into active military service, they were reorganized on paper as "triangular" divisions under the 1940 Tables Of Organization (TOE). The headquarters companies of the two infantry brigades were consolidated into the division's cavalry reconnaissance troop, and one infantry regiment was removed by inactivation. The field artillery brigade headquarters and headquarters battery became the headquarters and headquarters battery of the division artillery. Its three field artillery regiments were reorganized into four battalions; one battalion was taken from each of the two 75 mm gun regiments to form two 105 mm howitzer battalions, the brigade's ammunition train was reorganized as the third 105 mm howitzer battalion, and the 155 mm howitzer battalion was formed from the 155 mm howitzer regiment. The engineer, medical, and quartermaster regiments were reorganized into battalions. In 1942, divisional quartermaster battalions were split into ordnance light maintenance companies and quartermaster companies, and the division's headquarters and military police company, which had previously been a combined unit, was split.

==== Division organization ====
The division consisted of the following units:

83rd Infantry Division organization (click to enlarge)

- 83rd Infantry Division
  - 83rd Infantry Division Headquarters
  - 83rd Cavalry Reconnaissance Troop (Mechanized) (M3 scout cars and then M8 Greyhound armored cars)
  - 329th Infantry Regiment
    - Headquarters and Headquarters Company
    - 3× Infantry battalions
      - each battalion consists of: 1× Headquarters and Headquarters Company, 3× Rifle companies, 1× Heavy Weapons Company
    - Cannon Company (T12 Gun Motor Carriages and T19 Howitzer Motor Carriages, later replaced by either M3 105mm towed howitzers or M7 Priest self propelled howitzers)
    - Anti-Tank Company (M3 37mm anti-tank guns, which were replaced by 1944 with M1 57mm anti-tank guns)
    - Service Company
  - 330th Infantry Regiment
    - same organization as 329th Infantry Regiment
  - 331st Infantry Regiment
    - same organization as 329th Infantry Regiment
  - 83rd Infantry Division Artillery
    - Headquarters and Headquarters Battery
    - 322nd Field Artillery Battalion
      - Headquarters and Headquarters Battery
      - 3× Batteries (M2 105mm towed howitzers)
      - Service Battery
    - 323rd Field Artillery Battalion
      - same organization as 322nd Field Artillery Battalion
    - 324th Field Artillery Battalion
      - Headquarters and Headquarters Battery
      - 3× Batteries (M1 155mm towed howitzers)
      - Service Battery
    - 908th Field Artillery Battalion
      - same organization as 322nd Field Artillery Battalion
  - Headquarters Special Troops
    - Headquarters Company, 83rd Infantry Division
    - 83rd Signal Company
    - 83rd Quartermaster Company
    - 783rd Ordnance Light Maintenance Company
    - Military Police Platoon
    - 83rd Infantry Division Band (attached)
  - 308th Engineer Combat Battalion
    - Headquarters and Headquarters and Service Company
    - 3× Engineer combat companies
  - 308th Medical Battalion
    - Headquarters and Headquarters Detachment
    - 3× Collecting companies
    - Clearing Company

==== Combat chronicle ====
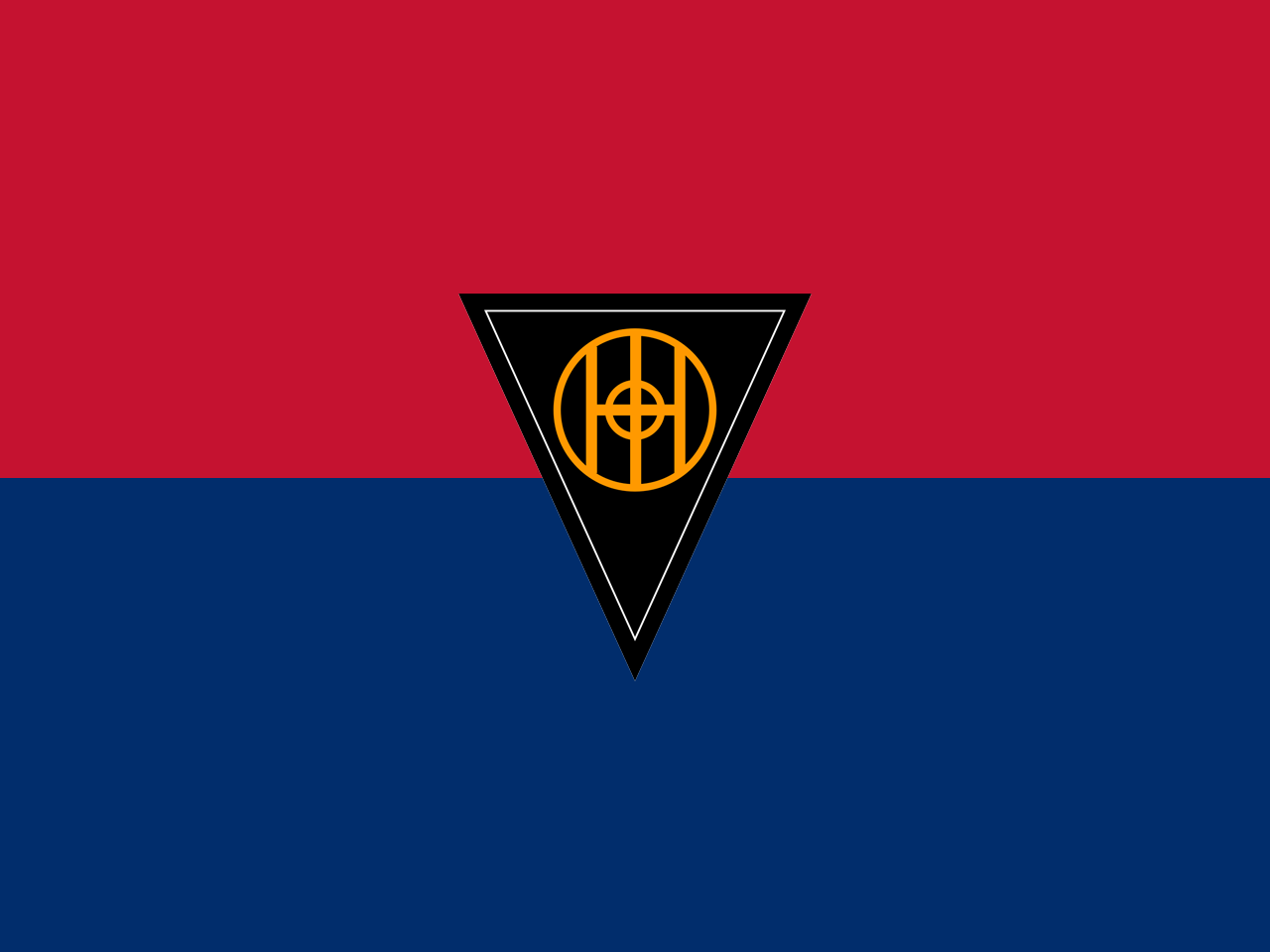
Flag of the United States Army 83rd Infantry Division

The 83rd Infantry Division was ordered into active military service on 15 August 1942 at Camp Atterbury, Indiana. The original officer cadre was a small group of Regular Army officers plus more officers from various National Guard units, while the original enlisted cadre was from the 3rd Cavalry Regiment. The rest of the original officer personnel were chiefly officer candidate school graduates, with a few Reserve officers and transfers from other units, while the bulk of the enlisted personnel were draftees.

The division, commanded by Major General Robert C. Macon, arrived in England on 16 April 1944 with its first divisional headquarters at Keele Hall in Staffordshire. After training in Wales, the division, taking part in the Allied invasion of Normandy, landed at Omaha Beach, 18 June 1944, and entered the hedgerow struggle south of Carentan, 27 June. Taking the offensive, the 83rd reached the St. Lo-Periers Road, 25 July, and advanced 8 miles (13 km) against strong opposition as the Normandy Campaign ended.

After a period of training, elements of the division took Châteauneuf-d'Ille-et-Vilaine, 5 August, and Dinard, 15 August, and approached the heavily fortified area protecting St. Malo. Intense fighting during the Battle of Saint-Malo reduced enemy strong points and a combined attack against the Citadel Fortress of St. Servan caused its surrender, 17 August. While elements moved south to protect the north bank of the Loire River, the main body of the division concentrated south of Rennes for patrolling and reconnaissance activities. Elements reduced the garrison at Ile de Cézembre, which surrendered, 2 September. On 16 September 1944: in the only surrender of a German Major General to U.S. troops, Botho Henning Elster surrendered with 18,850 men and 754 officers at the Loire bridge of Beaugency. (Note: The troops under Elster's command were not an organized fighting unit. They consisted of the various occupation forces from along the Atlantic coast and down to the Pyrenees. They had limited supplies of ammunition and rations, and no radio contact with Germany. They had marched as far as the Loire, but with bridges down and American troops patrolling the North bank, there seemed no reasonable prospect of achieving a crossing. To avoid needless loss of life, Elster negotiated a surrender. Whilst he was a prisoner of war, he was tried by the Reich War Court in Nazi Germany, in his absence, and condemned to death.) The movement into Luxembourg was completed on 25 September. Taking Remich on the 28th and patrolling defensively along the Moselle, the 83d resisted counterattacks and advanced to the Siegfried Line defenses across the Sauer after capturing Grevenmacher and Echternach, 7 October. As the initial movement in operation "Unicorn," the division took Le Stromberg Hill in the vicinity of Basse Konz against strong opposition, 5 November, and beat off counterattacks.

Moving to the Hurtgen Forest, the 83rd Division thrust forward from Gressenich to the west bank of the Roer. It entered the Battle of the Bulge, 27 December, striking at Rochefort and reducing the enemy salient in a bitter struggle. The division moved back to Belgium and the Netherlands for rehabilitation and training, 22 January 1945. On 1 March, the 83rd Division advanced toward the Rhine in Operation Grenade, and captured Neuss. The west bank of the Rhine from north of Oberkassel to the Erft Canal was cleared and defensive positions established by 2 March and the division renewed its training. The 83rd Division crossed the Rhine south of Wesel, 29 March, and advanced across the Munster Plain to the Weser, crossing it at Bodenwerder. The division crossed the Leine, 8 April, and attacked to the east, pushing over the Harz Mountain region and advancing to the Elbe at Barby. That city was taken on 13 April. The 83rd Division established a bridgehead over the river.

On 11 April 1945 the 83rd Division encountered Langenstein-Zwieberge, a subcamp of the Buchenwald concentration camp. At the camp, the troops found approximately 1,100 inmates who were malnourished and in extremely poor physical condition. The 83rd Division reported the death rate at the camp had been 500 per month. The prisoners had been forced to work 16-hour days in nearby mines, and were shot if they became too weak to work. After liberation, the death rate continued at approximately 25–50 people per day, due to the severe physical debilitation of the prisoners. To slow the spread of sickness and death, the 83rd Division ordered the local German mayor to supply the camp with food and water, and medical supplies were requisitioned from the U.S. Army's 20th Field Hospital. In addition, the 83rd Division recovered documents for use by war crimes investigators.

==== The Rag-Tag Circus ====
During the rush to the Elbe river, wartime correspondents nicknamed the 83rd "The Rag-Tag Circus" due to its resourceful commander, Major General Robert C. Macon, ordering the supplementing of the division's transport with anything that moved, "no questions asked".

The 83rd moved as fast as an armored task force in an assortment of hurriedly repainted captured German vehicles: Wehrmacht kubelwagens, staff cars, ammunition trucks, Panzers, motor bikes, buses, a concrete mixer, and two fire engines. Every enemy unit or town that surrendered or was captured subscribed its quota of rolling stock for the division, usually at gunpoint. These newly acquired vehicles were quickly painted olive-green and fitted with a U.S. star before joining the 83rd. The division even seized and flew a German Bf 109.

From the air the column bore no resemblance to either an armored or an infantry division. But for a number of U.S. Army trucks interspersed among its columns, it might easily have been mistaken for a German convoy.

==== Casualties ====
- Total battle casualties: 15,910
- Killed in action: 3,161
- Wounded in action: 11,807
- Missing in action: 279
- Prisoner of war: 663

==== Assignments in ETO ====
- 8 April 1944: VIII Corps, Third Army
- 25 June 1944: Third Army, but attached to the VIII Corps of First Army
- 1 July 1944: VII Corps
- 15 July 1944: VIII Corps
- 1 August 1944: XV Corps, Third Army, 12th Army Group
- 3 August 1944: VIII Corps
- 5 September 1944: VIII Corps, Ninth Army, 12th Army Group
- 10 September 1944: Ninth Army, 12th Army Group
- 21 September 1944: Third Army, 12th Army Group
- 11 October 1944: VIII Corps, Ninth Army, 12th Army Group
- 22 October 1944: VIII Corps, First Army, 12th Army Group
- 8 November 1944: Third Army, 12th Army Group
- 11 November 1944: VIII Corps, First Army, 12th Army Group
- 7 December 1944: VII Corps, First Army, 12th Army Group
- 20 December 1944: Attached, with the entire First Army, to the 21st Army Group
- 22 December 1944: XIX Corps, Ninth Army (attached to the British 21st Army Group)
- 26 December 1944: VII Corps, First Army (attached to British 21st Army Group), 12th Army Group
- 16 February 1945: XIX Corps, Ninth Army, 12th Army Group
- 8 May 1945: XIII Corps

== 83rd Army Reserve Command ==
The 83rd Infantry Division became the 83rd Army Reserve Command (83rd ARCOM) on April 22, 1968 with headquarters were in Columbus, Ohio. It mobilized 19 units for Desert Shield/Desert Storm and was deactivated in 1996.

== 83rd United States Army Reserve Readiness Training Center ==
The army activated 83rd United States Army Reserve Readiness Training Center (83rd USARRTC) in 2014 as the US Army Reserve's premier center of learning excellence, and provides professional education and training to enhance Total Force readiness.

The 83rd United States Army Reserve Readiness Training Center (83rd USARRTC) is a subordinate unit of the 100th Training Division (Operational Support). As of January 2026 the center consists of the following units:

- 83rd United States Army Reserve Readiness Training Center (83rd USARRTC), at Fort Knox (KY)
  - Readiness Training Academy, at Fort Knox (KY)
  - NCO Academy Camp Parks, at Camp Parks (CA)
  - NCO Academy Fort Dix, at Joint Base McGuire–Dix–Lakehurst (NJ)
  - NCO Academy Fort McCoy, at Fort McCoy (Wisconsin)

== Notable personnel ==
- Neville Brand, actor, infantryman with the 331st Infantry Regiment, 83rd Infantry Division
- Rick Fletcher, a war photographer of the 83rd Infantry Division
- Ralph G. Neppel, Medal of Honor recipient, 329th Infantry Regiment, 83rd Infantry Division
- Tony Vaccaro, a war photographer of the 83rd Infantry Division
