= Kingsley A. Taft =

American judge and politician

Kingsley Arter Taft
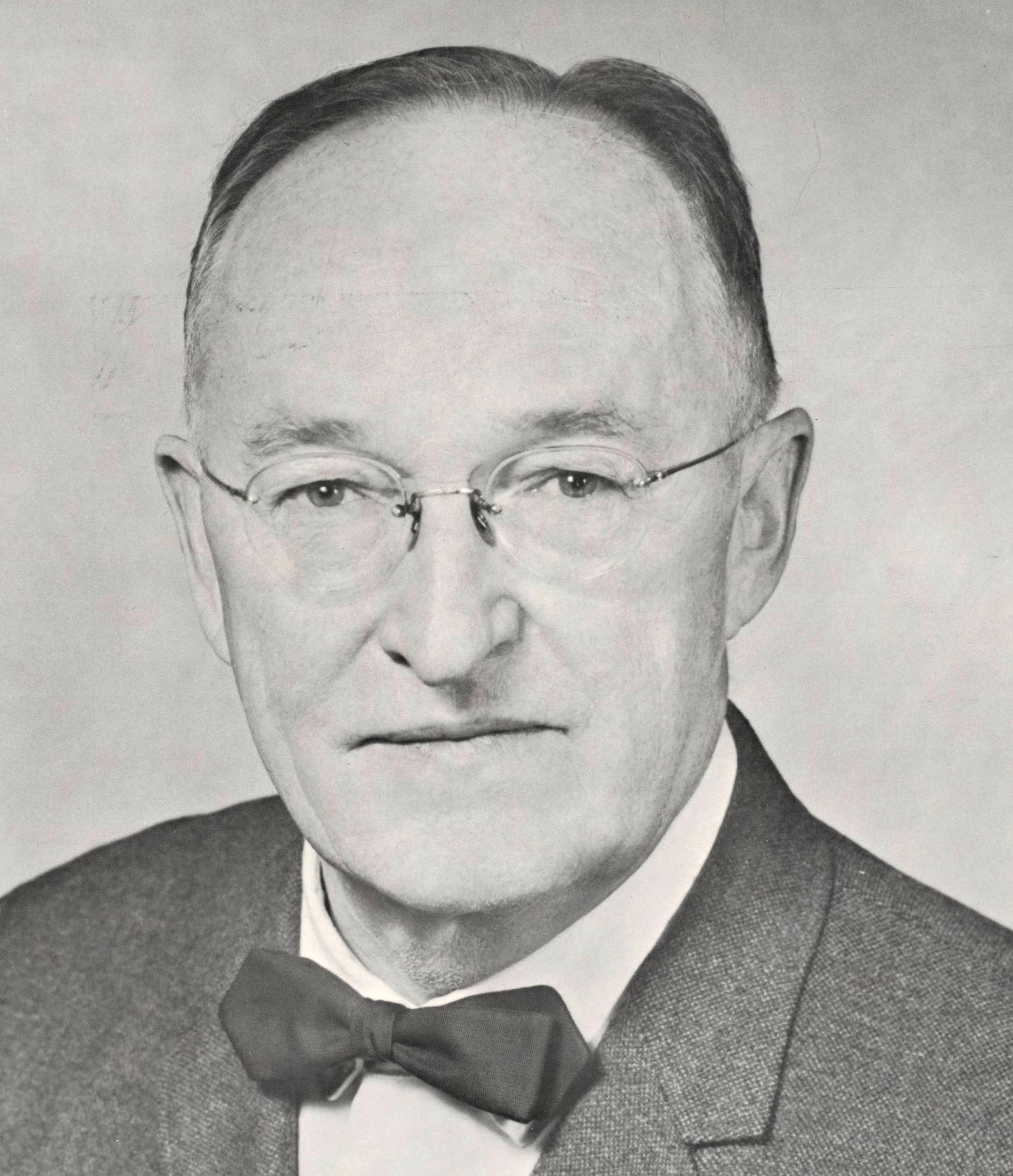
- Taft c. 1962

Chief Justice of the Ohio Supreme Court
- In office January 1, 1963 – March 28, 1970
- Preceded by: Carl V. Weygandt
- Succeeded by: C. William O'Neill

Justice of the Ohio Supreme Court
- In office January 1, 1949 – December 31, 1962
- Preceded by: Robert M. Sohngen
- Succeeded by: Rankin Gibson

United States Senator from Ohio
- In office November 6, 1946 – January 3, 1947
- Preceded by: James W. Huffman
- Succeeded by: John W. Bricker

Member of the Ohio House of Representatives
- In office 1933–1934; 1940

Personal details
- Born: July 19, 1903 Cleveland, Ohio
- Died: March 28, 1970 (aged 66) Columbus, Ohio
- Resting place: Lake View Cemetery
- Party: Republican
- Spouse: Louise Dakin
- Children: 4
- Education: Amherst College; Harvard Law School

Military service
- Allegiance: United States
- Branch/service: United States Army
- Years of service: 1943–1946
- Battles/wars: World War II

Kingsley Arter Taft (July 19, 1903 – March 28, 1970) was an American politician and distant relative of Ohio's famous Taft family. He served as chief justice of the Ohio Supreme Court and also served briefly as a United States senator. Kingsley's father, Frederick Lovett Taft, II was also a noted figure in the Ohio legal profession.

== Biography ==
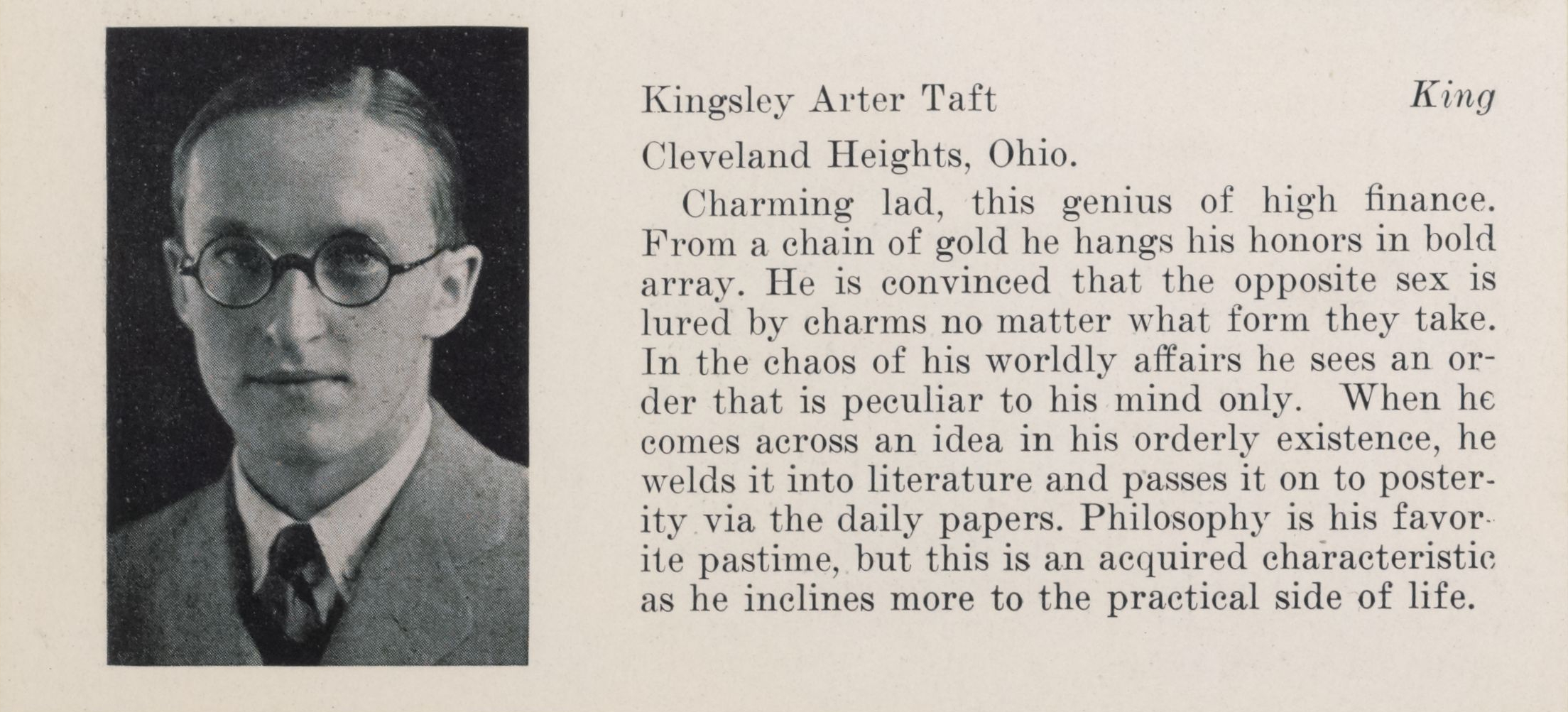
Taft in the Amherst College yearbook, 1925

Taft was born in Cleveland, Ohio, to Frederick L. and Mary Alice (née Arter) Taft. He graduated from high school there and received a bachelor's degree from Amherst College, where he was a member of Phi Kappa Psi, in 1925. He received a law degree from Harvard University in 1928. Taft then practiced as a lawyer in Ohio. He attained a partnership in the law firm that would eventually become Arter and Hadden.

Taft served in the Ohio House of Representatives from 1933 to 1934. In 1940, he was elected to the Shaker Heights, Ohio, board of education on which he served until 1942, the last year as president. He served in the U.S. Army during World War II, eventually rising to the rank of Major.

In 1946, when U.S. Senator Harold H. Burton (R-Ohio) resigned in order to accept an appointment to the U.S. Supreme Court, the vacancy was filled by a special election. In that election Taft ran and defeated Democrat Henry P. Webber. Taft served out Burton's term, which expired in 1947. He also served with his sixth cousin once removed Robert A. Taft during his four-month tenure, and did not run for election to the next full term.

In 1948, he was elected to a judgeship on the Ohio Supreme Court, defeating Democrat Robert M. Sohngen. In 1954, he was re-elected to the position without opposition. In 1960, Taft defeated Joseph H. Ellison for a third term on the Supreme Court, but in 1962, Taft decided to run for Chief Justice of the Ohio Supreme Court. Taft then beat Democratic incumbent Carl V. Weygandt. Weygant, who was 74 years old and seeking a sixth term, lost by a margin of less than 1,600 votes, out of more than 2.6 million votes cast. In 1968, Taft was re-elected Chief Justice of the Court, defeating Democrat John C. Duffy, but died in office two years after his last election in 1970.

== Personal life ==
Taft met his wife Louise Dakin at college. They were married September 14, 1927. They had four sons.

Taft was buried at Lake View Cemetery in Cleveland, Ohio.

== Bibliography ==
- Derby, George; White, James T., eds. (1921). "Taft, Frederick Lovett". The National Cyclopædia of American Biography. New York: James T. White & Co.

Party political offices
Preceded by Harold Hitz Burton	Republican nominee for U.S. Senator from Ohio (Class 1); 1946	Succeeded by John W. Bricker
U.S. Senate
Preceded by James W. Huffman	United States Senator (Class 1) from Ohio; November 6, 1946 - January 3, 1947	Succeeded by John W. Bricker
Legal offices
Preceded by Carl V. Weygandt	Chief Justice of the Ohio Supreme Court; January 1, 1963-March 28, 1970	Succeeded by C. William O'Neill
Preceded by Robert M. Sohngen	Ohio Supreme Court Associate Justice; January 1, 1949-December 31, 1962	Succeeded by Rankin Gibson
