= 329th Infantry Regiment =

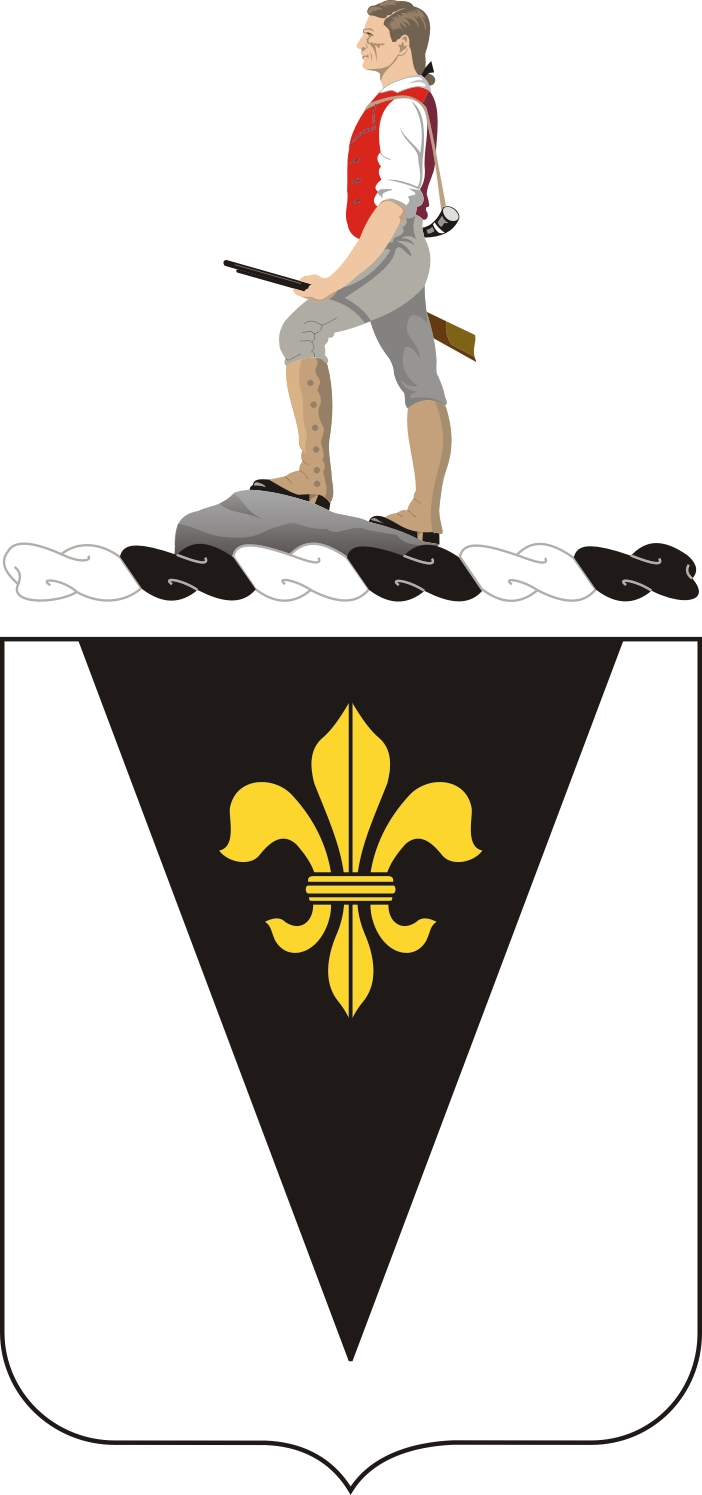
- Coat of arms
- Active: 1917-present
- Country: United States
- Branch: U.S. Army Reserve
- Type: Infantry
- Size: Regiment
- Nickname: Thunderbolt
- Patron: 83rd Infantry Division
- Motto: "Nous Gardons" (We Guard)
- Colors: Black and Yellow
- Mascot: Willie
- Engagements: World War I World War II

Insignia
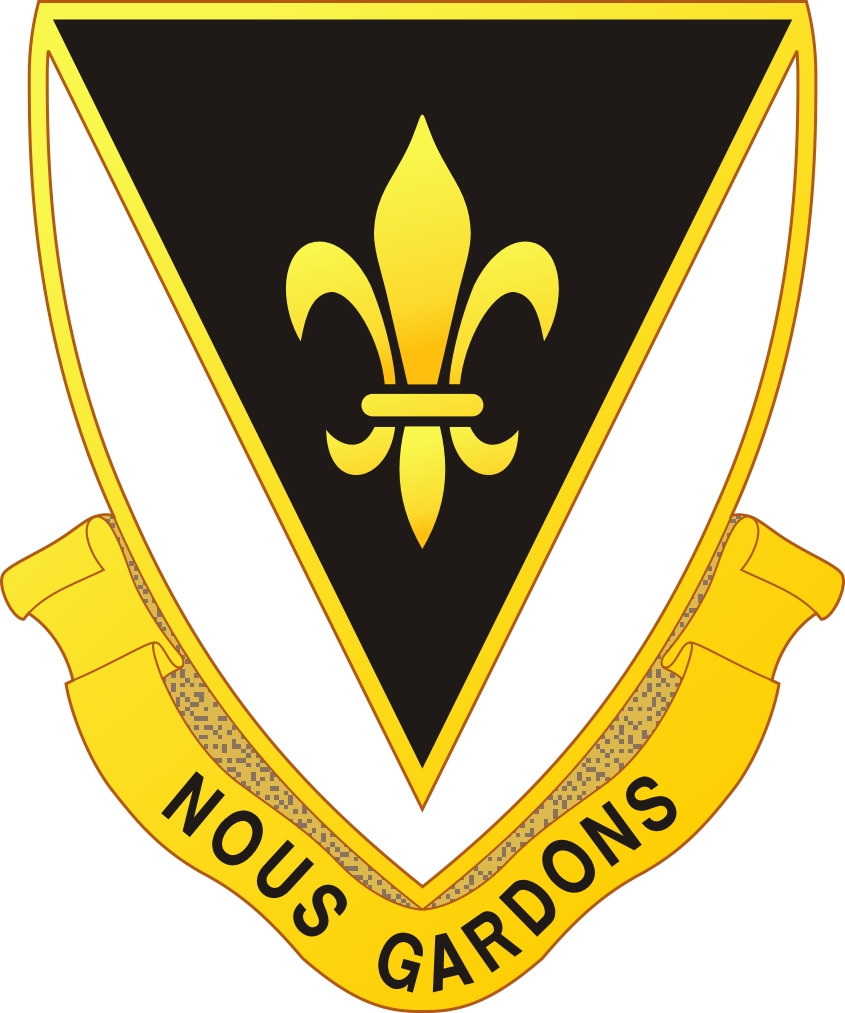
- Distinctive unit insignia

The 329th Infantry Regiment is a unit of the United States Army. During World War I and World War II. It was part of the 83rd Infantry Division.

== History ==
=== World War I ===
The 329th Infantry was constituted 5 August 1917 in the National Army and assigned to the 83rd Division. It was organized on 30 August 1917 at Camp Sherman, Ohio.

=== Interwar period ===
The 329th Infantry arrived at the port of New York on 1 February 1919 on the troopship SS Minnekahda and was demobilized on 15 February 1919 at Camp Sherman, Ohio. Pursuant to the National Defense Act of 1920, the regiment was reconstituted in the Organized Reserve on 24 June 1921, assigned to the 83rd Division, and allotted to the Fifth Corps Area. It was initiated (activated) on 21 December 1921 with the regimental headquarters at Dayton, Ohio. Subordinate battalion headquarters were organized for the 1st Battalion at Hamilton, Ohio; 2nd Battalion at Columbus, Ohio; and the 3rd Battalion at Bellefontaine, Ohio. The regimental band was organized on 8 December 1923 at Dayton, and was inactivated on 3 October 1936. The regiment typically conducted Inactive Training Period meetings at the Federal Building in Cincinnati, Ohio, or South Armory in Boston. Officers conducted summer training most years with the 10th Infantry Regiment at Camp Knox or Fort Thomas, Kentucky. Officers also conducted infantry Citizens' Military Training Camps some years at Fort Thomas or Fort Benjamin Harrison, Indiana, as an alternate form of summer training. The primary ROTC "feeder" school for new Reserve lieutenants for the regiment was the University of Dayton.

=== World War II ===
The 329th Infantry was ordered into active military service 15 August 1942 and reorganized at Camp Atterbury, Indiana. During World War II, Lieutenant Sam Magill facilitated the mass surrender of 20,000 German troops on the banks of the Loire River on 17 September 1944. Brigadier General John Mauldin was the regimental surgeon during World War II. He took more than 400 photographs between the time the unit landed in England eight days after D-Day until Germany was liberated in 1945. General George S. Patton reviewed the 329th and concluded "That’s the finest body of soldiers I have ever seen in the field." The 329th Infantry Regiment was the closest US unit to Berlin at the end of World War II, being ordered to stop some 30 miles short of the city. The regiment was inactivated on 6 April 1946 at Camp Kilmer, New Jersey

=== Cold War to present ===
Activated 1 October 1946 with headquarters at Indianapolis, Indiana

(Organized Reserves redesignated 25 March 1948 as the Organized Reserve Corps; redesignated 9 July 1952 as the Army Reserve)

Relieved 1 March 1952 from assignment to the 83d Infantry Division and assigned to the 70th Infantry Division (United States)

Reorganized and redesignated 1 May 1959 as the 329th Regiment, an element of the 70th Division (Training), with headquarters at Detroit, Michigan

(Location of headquarters changed 7 April 1966 to Fraser, Michigan)

Reorganized 31 January 1968 to consist of the 1st and 3d Battalions, elements of the 70th Division (Training)

Reorganized 1 September 1971 to consist of the 1st, 2d, and 3d Battalions, elements of the 70th Division (Training)

Reorganized 1 October 1994 to consist of the 1st, 2d, and 3d Battalions, elements of the 70th Division (Institutional Training)

Reorganized 13 January 1995 to consist of the 1st and 2d Battalions, elements of the 70th Division (Institutional Training)

Reorganized 16 October - 16 November 1996 to consist of the 1st and 2d Battalions, elements of the 84th Division (Institutional Training)

Reorganized 1 October 2004 to consist of the 1st and 2d Battalions, elements of the 100th Division (Institutional Training)

Restructured on 15 January 2014 to be an Observer Controller/Trainer battalion under the 2nd Operations brigade under the 86th Training Division and the 84th Training Command

== Heraldry ==
=== Distinctive unit insignia ===
- Description: A Gold color metal and enamel device 1 1/8 inches (2.9 cm) in height consisting of a shield blazoned: Argent, on a pile Sable a fleur-de-lis Or. Attached around the bottom and sides of the shield a Gold scroll inscribed "NOUS GARDONS" in Black letters.
- Symbolism: White is the old Infantry color; the black pile is the background of the shoulder sleeve insignia of the 83d Division and the gold fleur-de-lis indicates the organization’s service in France. The motto translates to "We Guard."
- Background: The distinctive unit insignia was originally approved for the 329th Infantry Regiment on 7 May 1927. It was redesignated for the 329th Regiment on 22 August 1960.

=== Coat of arms ===
- Blazon
  - Shield: Argent, on a pile Sable a fleur-de-lis Or.
  - Crest: That for the regiments and separate battalions of the Army Reserve: On a wreath of the colors Argent and Sable the Lexington Minute Man Proper. The statue of the Minute Man, Captain John Parker (H.H. Kitson, sculptor), stands on the Common in Lexington, Massachusetts.
  - Motto: NOUS GARDONS (We Guard).
- Symbolism
  - Shield: White is the old Infantry color; the black pile is the background of the shoulder sleeve insignia of the 83d Division and the gold fleur-de-lis indicates the organization’s service in France.
  - Crest: The crest is that of the United States Army Reserve.
- Background: The coat of arms was originally approved for the 329th Infantry Regiment on 27 June 1925. It was redesignated for the 329th Regiment on 22 August 1960.

== Campaign participation credit ==
- World War I: Streamer without inscription
- World War II: Normandy; Northern France; Rhineland; Ardennes-Alsace; Central Europe

== Decorations ==
- 2d Battalion entitled to:

Presidential Unit Citation (Army) for GURZENICH
