= Ohio Division of Liquor Control =

State agency

The Ohio Division of Liquor Control, part of the Ohio Department of Commerce, controls alcohol manufacturing, distribution and sales within the U.S. state of Ohio. Ohio is an alcoholic beverage control state, thus the state has a monopoly over the wholesaling or retailing alcoholic beverages.

In Ohio, spirituous liquor is sold through privately owned businesses, known as contract liquor agencies. The Division licenses, supervises, and supplies these agencies with product. It also licenses and regulates all other businesses manufacturing, distributing, and selling alcoholic beverages of every kind within Ohio's borders. Jim Canepa is the current superintendent of this state agency.

On February 1, 2013, the hard liquor wholesaling portion of the Division's operation, as well as the actual ownership of all hard liquor held in inventory and awaiting sale to the public, was transferred to JobsOhio, a private non-profit corporation formed to take over the work of job promotion and creation and overall economic development from the Ohio Department of Development. The profits from the sale of the transferred inventory was intended to provide the new corporation with a stable source of funding for its economic development efforts for the twenty-five year term of the agreement. During the term of the agreement, oversight and management of the beverage alcohol industry in Ohio was to remain the responsibility of the Division of Liquor Control.

The Division of Liquor Control's approval process came under fire in early 2015 after The Columbus Dispatch published an article detailing High West Distillery's attempt to sell whiskey in the state of Ohio.
