= Orpheus, Ohio =

- Unincorporated community
- Location within Ohio
- Coordinates: 38°57′47″N 82°27′30″W
- Country: United States
- State: Ohio
- Counties: Jackson
- Elevation: 879 ft (268 m)
- Time zone: UTC-5 (Eastern (EST))
  - Summer (DST): UTC-4 (EDT)
- ZIP code: 45685
- Area code: 740
- GNIS feature ID: 1044196

Orpheus is an unincorporated community in Bloomfield Township, Jackson County, Ohio, United States.

== Location ==
It is located northeast of Oak Hill and east of Vega at the intersection of Orpheus-Keystone Road and Orpheus Road, at 38°57′47″N 82°27′30″W.

== Establishments ==
The Orpheus Post Office was established on September 15, 1888, and discontinued on September 14, 1907. Mail service is now handled through the Rempel branch.
