= Petrea, Ohio =

- Unincorporated community
- Location within Ohio
- Coordinates: 39°04′24″N 82°36′03″W
- Country: United States
- State: Ohio
- Counties: Jackson
- Elevation: 690 ft (210 m)
- Time zone: UTC-5 (Eastern (EST))
  - Summer (DST): UTC-4 (EDT)
- ZIP code: 45640
- Area code: 740
- GNIS feature ID: 1044407

Petrea is an unincorporated community in Lick Township, Jackson County, Ohio, United States. It is located on Ohio State Route 788 between Jackson and Wellston, at the intersection of Fairgreens Road (County Road 78), at 39°04′24″N 82°36′03″W.

== History ==
The "Petrea Mine" was Jackson County's first Number 2 "Quakertown" coal mine attached to a railroad, the Marietta and Cincinnati Railroad. Around the end of the Civil War, there was a small slope mine owned by William T. McClintock that was rich in Number 2 "Quakertown" coal. It was located about a half mile away from the Petrea Station though, and over a number of ridges, so it was inaccessible to the railroad. At the time, the coal was being transported the half mile to the railroad by mules pulling carts on a private narrow gauge track from the mine, but in 1866, the M&C railroad built the "Armstong Switch" just west of Petrea with a tipple at the end.

The Petrea Post office was originally established on January 3, 1879, and discontinued on February 16, 1880. At the time, the mail service was being handled through the Jackson branch. The post office was then re-established on December 11, 1900, and ultimately discontinued again on December 31, 1901. Mail service is now handled through the Roads branch.
