= Banner, Ohio =

- Unincorporated community
- Location within Ohio
- Coordinates: 38°56′24″N 82°35′42″W
- Country: United States
- State: Ohio
- Counties: Jackson
- Elevation: 705 ft (215 m)
- Time zone: UTC-5 (Eastern (EST))
  - Summer (DST): UTC-4 (EDT)
- ZIP code: 45656
- Area code: 740
- GNIS feature ID: 1065522

Banner (previously known as Vaughn's Station) is an unincorporated community in Franklin Township, Jackson County, Ohio, United States. It is located between Jackson and Oak Hill near the intersection of Clay Banner Road and Franklin Valley Road.

As of 1898, the railway station here on the M&C Railroad (later B&O Railroad's "South Branch") was known as Vaughn's Station. The Banner Post Office was established on April 12, 1881 and discontinued on November 14, 1903. Mail service was then handled through the Clay branch until its discontinuation in 1912. Mail service is currently handled through the Oak Hill branch.
