= Jonestown, Jackson County, Ohio =

Jonestown, Ohio
- Unincorporated community
- Location within Ohio
- Coordinates: 39°05′42″N 82°37′57″W
- Country: United States
- State: Ohio
- Counties: Jackson
- Elevation: 804 ft (245 m)
- Time zone: UTC-5 (Eastern (EST))
  - Summer (DST): UTC-4 (EDT)
- ZIP code: 45640
- Area code: 740
- GNIS feature ID: 1062832

Jonestown is an unincorporated community in Coal Township, Jackson County, Ohio, United States. It is located southwest of Coalton at 39°05′42″N 82°37′57″W, along Jackson Hill Road (County Road 36) between Buffalo and Chapman.
