= Monroe, Jackson County, Ohio =

Monroe, Ohio
- Unincorporated community
- Location within Ohio
- Coordinates: 38°51′23″N 82°37′45″W
- Country: United States
- State: Ohio
- Counties: Jackson
- Elevation: 692 ft (211 m)
- Time zone: UTC-5 (Eastern (EST))
  - Summer (DST): UTC-4 (EDT)
- ZIP code: 45656
- Area code: 740
- GNIS feature ID: 1076418

Monroe (previously known as Monroe Furnace and Monroe Station) is an unincorporated community in Jefferson Township, Jackson County, Ohio, United States. It is located southwest of Oak Hill on Ohio State Route 140 between Blackfork Junction and Firebrick, at 38°51′23″N 82°37′45″W.

The community of Monroe Furnace was founded around the Monroe Furnace, built in 1855. The Monroe Station Post Office was established on October 18, 1861, discontinued on March 21, 1864, re-established on September 29, 1868, discontinued again on February 29, 1884, re-established again on November 30, 1888, and ultimately discontinued again on May 3, 1890. Mail service is now handled through the Samsonville branch.
