= Andrew Roy =

Andrew Roy may refer to:

- Andrew Roy (actor), or Drew Roy
- Andrew Roy (sailor), in Laser World Championships
- Andrew Roy (figure skater) in Australian Figure Skating Championships
- Andrew Roy (mining inspector) (1880s), Ohio State Inspector of Mines, founder of Glen Roy, Ohio
