= Vega, Ohio =

- Unincorporated community
- Location within Ohio
- Coordinates: 38°57′29″N 82°29′50″W
- Country: United States
- State: Ohio
- Counties: Jackson
- Elevation: 899 ft (274 m)
- Time zone: UTC-5 (Eastern (EST))
  - Summer (DST): UTC-4 (EDT)
- ZIP code: 45685
- Area code: 740
- GNIS feature ID: 1065525

Vega (previously known as Herdman) is an unincorporated community in Bloomfield Township, Jackson County, Ohio, United States. It is located southeast of Jackson along U.S. Route 35 at the intersection of Ebb-Tomblin Road and Vega Road, at 38°57′29″N 82°29′50″W.

The Herdman post office was established on May 16, 1890, and was discontinued on July 31, 1906. Mail service is now handled through the Rempel branch.
