= Brocks Corner, Ohio =

- Unincorporated community
- Location within Ohio
- Coordinates: 39°11′26″N 82°45′38″W
- Country: United States
- State: Ohio
- Counties: Jackson
- Elevation: 633 ft (193 m)
- Time zone: UTC-5 (Eastern (EST))
  - Summer (DST): UTC-4 (EDT)
- ZIP code: 45672
- Area code: 740
- GNIS feature ID: 1070693

Brocks Corner (previously known as Brox Corner, Bronx Corner, or Springer) is an unincorporated community in Jackson Township, Jackson County, Ohio, United States. It is located northwest of Jackson at the intersection of U.S. Route 35 and Bronx Corner Road (County Road 27).

The official name of the community is Brocks Corner. The community is named after the Brock family, the original settlers, a number of whom are buried in the Brocks Corner Cemetery. There was a "Brock's Corner" post office here as of 1866, with a T. M. Pinkerton listed as Postmaster.
