= Kitchen, Ohio =

- Unincorporated community
- Location within Ohio
- Coordinates: 38°52′11″N 82°32′34″W
- Country: United States
- State: Ohio
- Counties: Jackson
- Elevation: 666 ft (203 m)
- Time zone: UTC-5 (Eastern (EST))
  - Summer (DST): UTC-4 (EDT)
- ZIP code: 45656
- Area code: 740
- GNIS feature ID: 1076187

Kitchen is an unincorporated community in Madison Township, Jackson County, Ohio, United States. It is located southeast of Oak Hill at the intersection of Ohio State Route 233 and CH&D Road, at 38°52′11″N 82°32′34″W.

The Kitchen Post Office was established on March 6, 1883, and discontinued on December 30, 1922. Mail service is now handled through the Oak Hill branch.
