= Comet, Ohio =

Comet, Ohio may refer to:

- Comet, Jackson County, Ohio
- Comet, Summit County, Ohio
