= Glade, Ohio =

- Unincorporated community
- Location within Ohio
- Coordinates: 39°00′48″N 82°46′58″W
- Country: United States
- State: Ohio
- Counties: Jackson
- Elevation: 690 ft (210 m)
- Time zone: UTC-5 (Eastern (EST))
  - Summer (DST): UTC-4 (EDT)
- ZIP code: 45613
- Area code: 740
- GNIS feature ID: 1064724

Glade (previously known as Whitman's Station) is an unincorporated community in Scioto Township, Jackson County, Ohio, United States. It is located southeast of Beaver at the intersection of the James A. Rhodes Appalachian Highway (Ohio State Route 32) and Glade Road (County Road 24), at 39°00′48″N 82°46′58″W.

The Glade Post Office was established on April 21, 1880, but was discontinued on October 31, 1924. Mail service is now handled through the Beaver branch.
