= William C. Dixon =

American judge

William Cornelius Dixon

Associate Justice of the Ohio Supreme Court
- In office November 8, 1938 – January 1, 1939
- Preceded by: Robert N. Gorman
- Succeeded by: William L. Hart

Personal details
- Born: July 1, 1904 Dexter, New York
- Died: January 10, 1997 (aged 92) San Diego, California
- Resting place: Whitehaven Park, Cleveland, Ohio
- Party: Democratic
- Spouse: Arvilla Pratt
- Children: two
- Education: University of Michigan; University of Michigan Law School

William Cornelius Dixon (July 1, 1904 – January 10, 1997) was an American government antitrust lawyer who had a two-month term as a justice of the Ohio Supreme Court in 1938.

== Biography ==
William Dixon was born July 1, 1904, in Dexter, New York, to Frank W. and Celia Potter Dixon. He received a bachelor's degree in 1926 and juris doctor in 1928 from the University of Michigan. He was admitted to the Ohio bar in 1928, working as an associate at Holiday, Grossman and McAfee in Cleveland from 1928 to 1932. He was assistant law director for Cleveland 1932–1933, then returned to private practice. He was unsuccessful as Democratic nominee for Ohio's 22nd congressional district in 1934.

Governor Martin L. Davey appointed Dixon to head the Relief Commission for Ohio under the Emergency Relief Act in 1938. He won election November 8 of that year to the unexpired term on the Ohio Supreme Court of Thomas A. Jones, who had died. His term ended January 1, 1939, and he wrote only one opinion during his two months on the court.

From 1939 to 1944, Dixon returned to private practice in Cleveland. From 1944 to 1954 he was special assistant to the Attorney General in the Antitrust Division of the U. S. Department of Justice, serving as chief assistant in the trial section of the antitrust division in 1945, chief of the West Coast offices in 1946, and chief of the Los Angeles office in 1948. He was admitted to the California bar, and to practice before the United States Supreme Court. He also served as legal advisor and member of the Joint War and State Departments Mission on Japanese Combines, aka the Zaibatsu mission, in 1946. He returned to private practice in 1954 in Los Angeles, and was assistant Attorney General for antitrust enforcement in California from 1959 to 1963.

Dixon died January 10, 1997, in San Diego, California, and is interred at Whitehaven Park in Cleveland. He married Arvilla Pratt in 1934, and had two children.

Party political offices
| Preceded by Florence E. Allen | Democratic Party nominee for Ohio's 22nd congressional district 1934 | Succeeded by Anthony A. Fleger |
