= Four Mile, Ohio =

- Unincorporated community
- Location within Ohio
- Coordinates: 38°59′00″N 82°38′32″W
- Country: United States
- State: Ohio
- Counties: Jackson
- Elevation: 699 ft (213 m)
- Time zone: UTC-5 (Eastern (EST))
  - Summer (DST): UTC-4 (EDT)
- ZIP code: 45640
- Area code: 740
- GNIS feature ID: 1071610

Four Mile (also known as FourMile) is an unincorporated community in Franklin Township, Jackson County, Ohio, United States. It is located south of Jackson at the intersection of Franklin Grange Road and Four Mile Road, at 38°59′00″N 82°38′32″W.
