= Ratchford =

Ratchford may refer to:

== People ==
- C. Brice Ratchford (1920–1997), American academic
- Jeremy Ratchford (born 1965), Canadian actor
- Michael D. Ratchford (1860–1927), American trade unionist
- Michael Ratchford (politician) (fl. 1992), American academic
- Stefan Ratchford (born 1988), English rugby league player
- William R. Ratchford (1934–2011), American politician

== Places ==
- Ratchford, Ohio, U.S.
- Ratchford Range, a mountain range in Canada
