= Glen Roy, Ohio =

- Unincorporated community
- Location within Ohio
- Coordinates: 39°06′45″N 82°34′47″W
- Country: United States
- State: Ohio
- Counties: Jackson
- Elevation: 764 ft (233 m)
- Time zone: UTC-5 (Eastern (EST))
  - Summer (DST): UTC-4 (EDT)
- ZIP code: 45692
- Area code: 740
- GNIS feature ID: 1062786

Glen Roy (also known as Glenroy) is an unincorporated community in Coal Township, Jackson County, Ohio, United States. It is located east of Coalton along Ohio State Route 93, between Altoona and Goldsboro, at 39°06′45″N 82°34′47″W.

== History ==
The community was laid out and founded by Andrew Roy, Ohio's first chief mining inspector. The Glen Roy post office was established on January 2, 1883. The name was changed to Glenroy on July 12, 1893, and the post office ultimately closed on July 30, 1921. Mail service is now handled through the Coalton branch.

== Notable Person ==
Lefty James, MLB pitcher
