= Glen Nell, Ohio =

- Unincorporated community
- Location within Ohio
- Coordinates: 39°08′51″N 82°37′17″W
- Country: United States
- State: Ohio
- Counties: Jackson
- Elevation: 663 ft (202 m)
- Time zone: UTC-5 (Eastern (EST))
  - Summer (DST): UTC-4 (EDT)
- ZIP code: 45692
- Area code: 740
- GNIS feature ID: 1062785

Glen Nell is an unincorporated community in Washington Township, Jackson County, Ohio, United States. It is located west of Wellston at the intersection of Glen Nell Road and Von-Glen Nell Road, at 39°08′51″N 82°37′17″W.

== History ==
Glen Nell was founded as a company town for the Glen Nell Coal Company. The company mined coal at this location in a slope mine called the "Glen Nell Mine", later called the "Phoenix Mine", opened about 1890. The company also operated two drift mines nearby, called "Eclipse #1" and "Eclipse #2". As of 1893, there were 15 miners, 8 day laborers, one Superintendent, and one Mine Boss employed at the mine and a spur of the CH&D Railroad leading to the location, but the mine was "long abandoned" by 1921.

There is a Wilcox Post Office listed as being "at the Glen Nell Coal Works", but no record of when it was established or discontinued.
