= Pattonsville =

Pattonsville may refer to:

- Pattonsville, Ohio
- Pattonsville, Virginia
