= Jonestown, Ohio =

Jonestown, Ohio may refer to:

- Jonestown, Jackson County, Ohio
- Jonestown, Van Wert County, Ohio
