= Buffalo, Ohio =

Buffalo, Ohio may refer to:

- Buffalo, Guernsey County, Ohio
- Buffalo, Jackson County, Ohio
