= Englishville =

Englishville may refer to:

- Englishville, Ohio
- Englishville, Michigan
