= Pyro, Ohio =

- Unincorporated community
- Location within Ohio
- Coordinates: 38°55′27″N 82°31′57″W
- Country: United States
- State: Ohio
- Counties: Jackson
- Elevation: 669 ft (204 m)
- Time zone: UTC-5 (Eastern (EST))
  - Summer (DST): UTC-4 (EDT)
- ZIP code: 45656
- Area code: 740
- GNIS feature ID: 1076700

Pyro is an unincorporated community in Madison Township, Jackson County, Ohio, United States. It is located northeast of Oak Hill along CH&D Road and on other side streets including Benner Avenue and Griffith Street, at 38°55′27″N 82°31′57″W.
