= Thomas A. Jones =

American judge

Thomas Alfred Jones
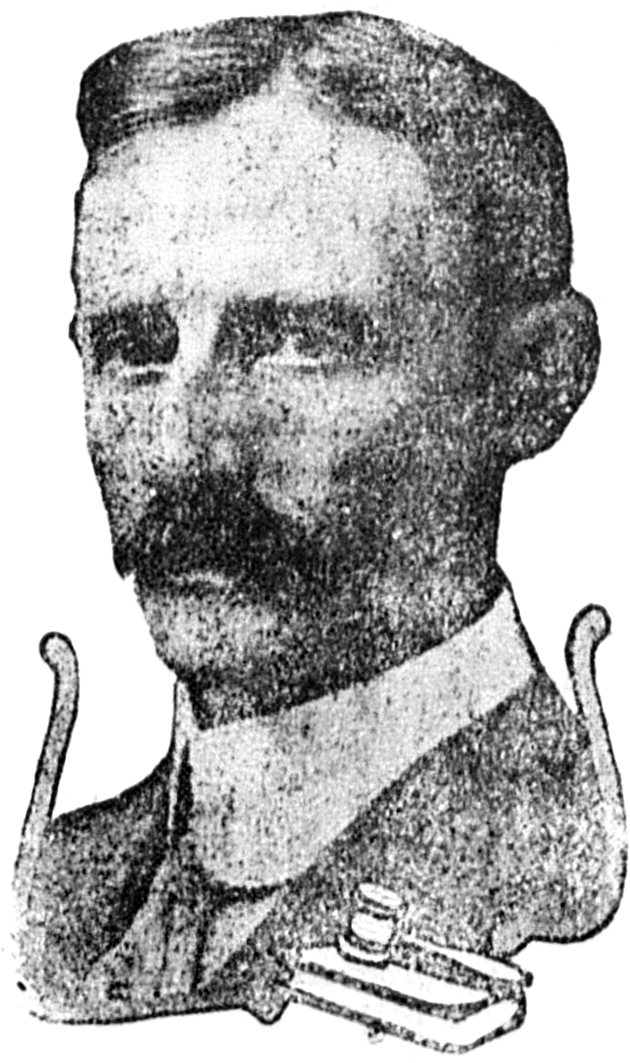
- circa 1914

Associate Justice of the Ohio Supreme Court
- In office January 1, 1915 – August 31, 1937
- Preceded by: J. Foster Wilkin
- Succeeded by: Robert N. Gorman

Personal details
- Born: March 4, 1859 Jefferson Furnace, Ohio
- Died: August 31, 1937 (aged 78) Columbus, Ohio
- Resting place: Fairmount Cemetery, Jackson, Ohio
- Party: Republican
- Spouse: Grace Hoyt
- Children: Four
- Education: Ohio University

Thomas Alfred Jones (March 4, 1859 – August 31, 1937) was a Republican lawyer in the U.S. State of Ohio. He was an associate justice of the Ohio Supreme Court from 1915 until his death.

== Biography ==
Thomas A. Jones was born March 4, 1859, at Jefferson Furnace, Jackson County, Ohio. He was in the first graduating class of four of the Jackson public high school in 1876. He graduated from Ohio University at Athens in 1881, where he was Phi Beta Kappa.

Jones returned to Jackson County, where he taught in a rural school, and read law at a Jackson office. He passed the bar exam in 1883, and partnered with his mentor, James M. Tripp, in private practice.

Jones was elected mayor of Jackson, and was the youngest holder of that office when he took office in April, 1886. He served a two-year term, and did not again seek office until 1900. That year, he was elected to the Fourth Circuit Court of Appeals, and re-elected in 1906. In 1912, he was elected to the District Court of Appeals that replaced the Circuit Court.

Jones ran as a Republican for the Ohio Supreme Court in November 1914. He was elected, and took office January 1, 1915. He was re-elected in 1920, 1926, and 1932. He wrote 329 majority, concurring, or dissenting opinions during his tenure.

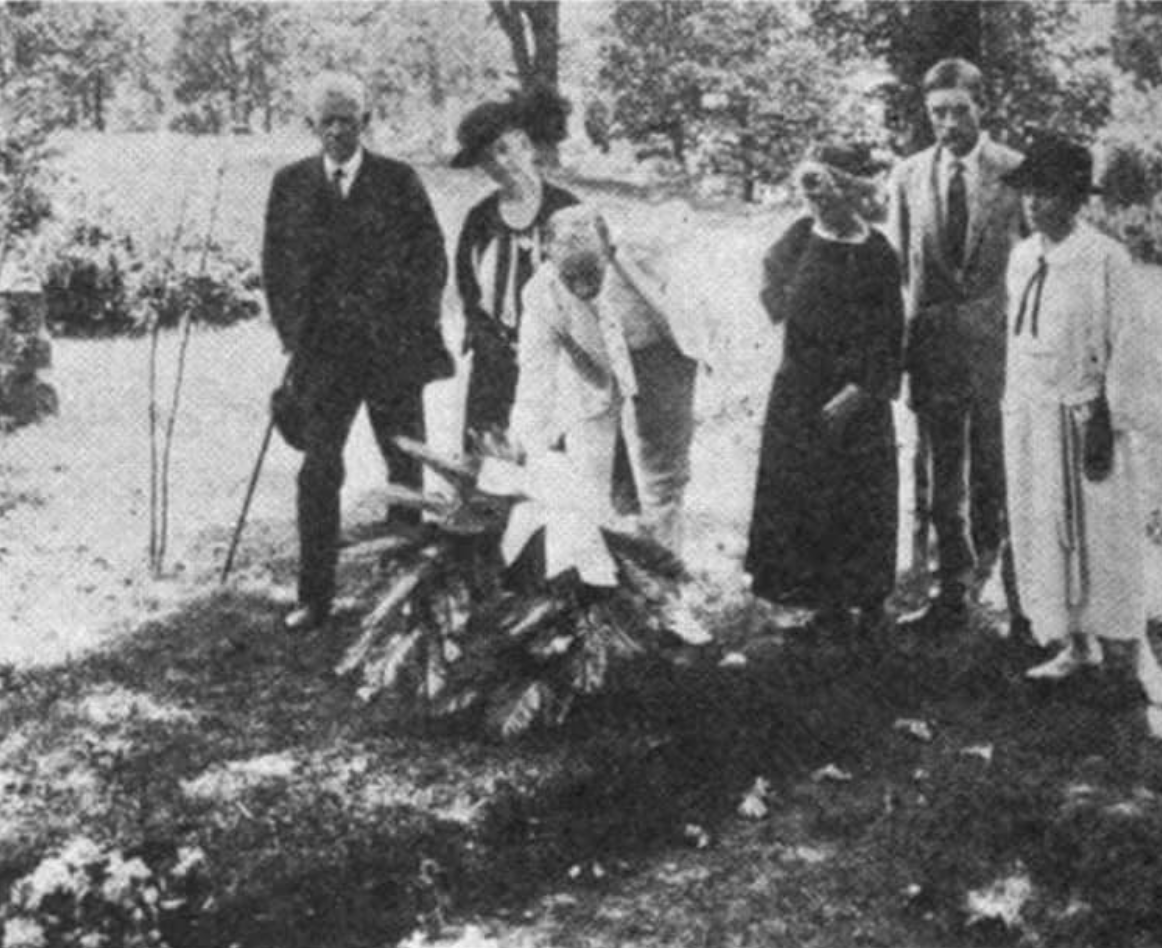
Archibald Henderson, Loula Roberts Platt, Judge Thomas A. Jones, Mrs. William Sidney Porter, Dr. Pinckney Herbert, and Mrs. Fagg Malloy at a wreath-laying ceremony for the poet O. Henry in 1922.

Jones's health began to fail in 1937, and he missed some sessions, and wrote fewer opinions. He died at his Columbus home on August 31, 1937. His funeral was at Jackson First Presbyterian Church, with burial at Fairmount Cemetery in Jackson.

Jones was married to Grace Hoyt of Athens on June 30, 1886, and raised four children. He was a Presbyterian and Freemason.
