= Goldsboro, Ohio =

- Unincorporated community
- Location within Ohio
- Coordinates: 39°07′01″N 82°34′05″W
- Country: United States
- State: Ohio
- Counties: Jackson
- Elevation: 784 ft (239 m)
- Time zone: UTC-5 (Eastern (EST))
  - Summer (DST): UTC-4 (EDT)
- ZIP code: 45692
- Area code: 740
- GNIS feature ID: 1064737

Goldsboro is an unincorporated community in Coal Township, Jackson County, Ohio, United States.

== Location ==
It is located west of Wellston on Ohio State Route 93, between Comet and Glen Roy.
