= Davisville, Ohio =

- Unincorporated community
- Location within Ohio
- Coordinates: 39°05′52″N 82°36′44″W
- Country: United States
- State: Ohio
- Counties: Jackson
- Elevation: 738 ft (225 m)
- Time zone: UTC-5 (Eastern (EST))
  - Summer (DST): UTC-4 (EDT)
- ZIP code: 45692
- Area code: 740
- GNIS feature ID: 1048651

Davisville is an unincorporated community in Coal Township, Jackson County, Ohio, United States. It is located south of Coalton along Ohio State Route 93, at 39°05′52″N 82°36′44″W.
