= Keystone, Ohio =

- Unincorporated community
- Location within Ohio
- Coordinates: 38°59′17″N 82°36′33″W
- Country: United States
- State: Ohio
- Counties: Jackson
- Elevation: 712 ft (217 m)
- Time zone: UTC-5 (Eastern (EST))
  - Summer (DST): UTC-4 (EDT)
- ZIP code: 45640
- Area code: 740
- GNIS feature ID: 1076178

Keystone (previously known as Keystone Station) is an unincorporated community in Bloomfield Township, Jackson County, Ohio, United States. It is located south of the city of Jackson, at the intersection of Franklin Valley Road and Keystone Station Road, at 38°59′17″N 82°36′33″W.

Keystone was founded as a company town for the Keystone Furnace, built between 1849 and 1853. The furnace itself is still standing at 39°00′36″N 82°26′55″W, and is listed on the National Register of Historic Places. At one time, the community had a population of 300-500 people. The post office was originally established as the Hughes Post Office on November 7, 1848. The name was changed to Keystone Post Office on October 1, 1849, and the branch was discontinued on July 16, 1853.
