= Savageville, Ohio =

- Unincorporated community
- Location within Ohio
- Coordinates: 39°08′20″N 82°43′09″W
- Country: United States
- State: Ohio
- Counties: Jackson
- Elevation: 617 ft (188 m)
- Time zone: UTC-5 (Eastern (EST))
  - Summer (DST): UTC-4 (EDT)
- ZIP code: 45672
- Area code: 740
- GNIS feature ID: 1045978

Savageville is an unincorporated community in Jackson Township, Jackson County, Ohio, United States. It is located northwest of Jackson at the intersection of U.S. Route 35 and Spencer Road, at 39°08′20″N 82°43′09″W.
