= Hamilton Township, Ohio =

Hamilton Township, Ohio, may refer to:

- Hamilton Township, Butler County, Ohio, a former township now the city of Hamilton, Ohio
- Hamilton Township, Franklin County, Ohio
- Hamilton Township, Jackson County, Ohio
- Hamilton Township, Lawrence County, Ohio
- Hamilton Township, Warren County, Ohio
