= Winchester, Jackson County, Ohio =

Winchester, Ohio
- Unincorporated community
- Location within Ohio
- Coordinates: 38°59′13″N 82°32′21″W
- Country: United States
- State: Ohio
- Counties: Jackson
- Elevation: 748 ft (228 m)
- Time zone: UTC-5 (Eastern (EST))
  - Summer (DST): UTC-4 (EDT)
- ZIP code: 45692
- Area code: 740
- GNIS feature ID: 1077206

Winchester is an unincorporated community in Bloomfield Township, Jackson County, Ohio, United States. It is located southeast of Jackson along U.S. Route 35, next to Rocky Hill, at the intersection of Dixon Run Road (County Road 41) and Winchester-Vega Road, at 38°59′13″N 82°32′21″W.
