= Camba (disambiguation) =

Camba may refer to:

- The Camba people of Bolivia
- Camba Busch, nickname of Germán Busch, Bolivian former president
- The China–Australia Migratory Bird Agreement, a bird migration treaty
- Cambridge Brain Analysis (CamBA), a brain analysis software

== Places ==
- Camba, Ohio in the United States
