= Big Rock, Ohio =

- Unincorporated community
- Location within Ohio
- Coordinates: 39°06′06″N 82°46′35″W
- Country: United States
- State: Ohio
- Counties: Jackson
- Elevation: 679 ft (207 m)
- Time zone: UTC-5 (Eastern (EST))
  - Summer (DST): UTC-4 (EDT)
- ZIP code: 45640
- Area code: 740
- GNIS feature ID: 1049577

Big Rock is an unincorporated community in Liberty Township, Jackson County, Ohio, United States. It is located northwest of Jackson at the intersection of Big Rock Road and Big Run Road.
