= Rocky Hill, Ohio =

- Unincorporated community
- Location within Ohio
- Coordinates: 38°59′20″N 82°32′42″W
- Country: United States
- State: Ohio
- Counties: Jackson
- Elevation: 712 ft (217 m)
- Time zone: UTC-5 (Eastern (EST))
  - Summer (DST): UTC-4 (EDT)
- ZIP code: 45640
- Area code: 740
- GNIS feature ID: 1076760

Rocky Hill is an unincorporated community in Bloomfield Township, Jackson County, Ohio, United States. It is located southeast of Jackson along U.S. Route 35, next to Winchester at the intersection of C H & D Road (Ohio State Route 327) and Dixon Run Road (County Road 41), at 38°59′20″N 82°32′42″W.

The Rocky Hill Post Office was established about 3 miles (4.8 km) east of the community's current location on July 5, 1839. The name was changed to Rockyhill Post Office on June 6, 1894, and ultimately discontinued on May 31, 1919. Mail service is now handled by the Jackson branch.

At one time, there was a station here on the Cincinnati, Hamilton and Dayton Railway called Rocky Hill Station.
