= Horeb, Ohio =

- Unincorporated community
- Location within Ohio
- Coordinates: 38°54′12″N 82°36′44″W
- Country: United States
- State: Ohio
- Counties: Jackson
- Elevation: 863 ft (263 m)
- Time zone: UTC-5 (Eastern (EST))
  - Summer (DST): UTC-4 (EDT)
- ZIP code: 45656
- Area code: 740
- GNIS feature ID: 1067414

Horeb is an unincorporated community in Jefferson Township, Jackson County, Ohio, United States. It is located west of Oak Hill on Ohio State Route 279, at 38°54′12″N 82°36′44″W.
