= Garfield, Ohio =

Garfield, Ohio may refer to:

- Garfield, Jackson County, Ohio
- Garfield, Mahoning County, Ohio
