= Lesmil, Ohio =

- Unincorporated community
- Location within Ohio
- Coordinates: 39°09′30″N 82°34′15″W
- Country: United States
- State: Ohio
- Counties: Jackson
- Elevation: 774 ft (236 m)
- Time zone: UTC-5 (Eastern (EST))
  - Summer (DST): UTC-4 (EDT)
- ZIP code: 45692
- Area code: 740
- GNIS feature ID: 1062851

Lesmil (previously known as Summit) is an unincorporated community in Washington Township, Jackson County, Ohio, United States. It is located about 2.2 miles (3.5 km) west of Hamden along Les Mil Road (County Road 33), at 39°09′30″N 82°34′15″W.

In 1860, there was a telegraph station located here on the Marietta and Cincinnati Railroad.
