= Oakland, Jackson County, Ohio =

Oakland, Ohio
- Unincorporated community
- Location within Ohio
- Coordinates: 39°05′03″N 82°42′47″W
- Country: United States
- State: Ohio
- Counties: Jackson
- Elevation: 823 ft (251 m)
- Time zone: UTC-5 (Eastern (EST))
  - Summer (DST): UTC-4 (EDT)
- ZIP code: 45640
- Area code: 740
- GNIS feature ID: 1065185

Oakland (previously known as Hillsdale) is an unincorporated community in Liberty Township, Jackson County, Ohio, United States. It is located northwest of Jackson at the intersection of Valley Chapel Road and Oakland Road, at 39°05′03″N 82°42′47″W.

The Hillsdale Post Office was established on August 21, 1882, and discontinued on February 13, 1904. Mail service is now handled through the Jackson branch.
