= Mabee Corner, Ohio =

- Unincorporated community
- Location within Ohio
- Coordinates: 38°54′10″N 82°43′16″W
- Country: United States
- State: Ohio
- Counties: Jackson
- Elevation: 640 ft (195 m)
- Time zone: UTC-5 (Eastern (EST))
  - Summer (DST): UTC-4 (EDT)
- ZIP code: 45656
- Area code: 740
- GNIS feature ID: 1070828

Mabee Corner (also previously known as Mabee's Stand and simply Mabee's) is an unincorporated community in Hamilton Township, Jackson County, Ohio, United States. It is located west of Oak Hill at the intersection of Bucklick Creek Road (County Road 63) and Ohio State Route 139, at 38°54′10″N 82°43′16″W.

The town is named for William Mabee, who built a store here in 1846 called "Mabee's Stand". The Mabees Post Office was originally established at Mabee's store on September 27, 1849, with James Mabee as the first Postmaster. It was the fourth post office established in the county. The post office was moved and the name was changed to Mabee Post Office on July 11, 1892. Later it was moved back to the store location, but ultimately discontinued on September 15, 1904. Mail service is now handled through the Oak hill branch. As of 1916, Mabee was the only community in the township.
