= Pattonsville, Ohio =

- Unincorporated community
- Location within Ohio
- Coordinates: 39°01′54″N 82°29′51″W
- Country: United States
- State: Ohio
- Counties: Jackson
- Elevation: 804 ft (245 m)
- Time zone: UTC-5 (Eastern (EST))
  - Summer (DST): UTC-4 (EDT)
- ZIP code: 45640
- Area code: 740
- GNIS feature ID: 1061386

Pattonsville is an unincorporated community in Bloomfield Township, Jackson County, Ohio, United States. It is located east of Jackson at the intersection of Pattonsville Road and Goose Run Road, at 39°01′54″N 82°29′51″W.

== History ==
The site was first surveyed by Joseph Hanna in the 1840s. The community was given its name because many "Pattons" lived there.
