= Blackfork Junction, Ohio =

- Unincorporated community
- Location within Ohio
- Coordinates: 38°51′37″N 82°36′02″W
- Country: United States
- State: Ohio
- Counties: Jackson
- Elevation: 689 ft (210 m)
- Time zone: UTC-5 (Eastern (EST))
  - Summer (DST): UTC-4 (EDT)
- ZIP code: 45656
- Area code: 740
- GNIS feature ID: 1075394

Blackfork Junction (also previously known as Blackfork Station, Samsonville, and Washington Furnace) is an unincorporated community in Jefferson Township, Jackson County, Ohio.

The station on the Ohio Southern Railroad that was located here, and the community itself, have had many names. It was previously called Black Fork Junction, Black Fork Station, and Samsonville. Before that, an 1898 railroad map shows the name "Washington Furnace", and an 1873 map shows it listed simply as "Washington".
