= Altoona, Ohio =

- Unincorporated community
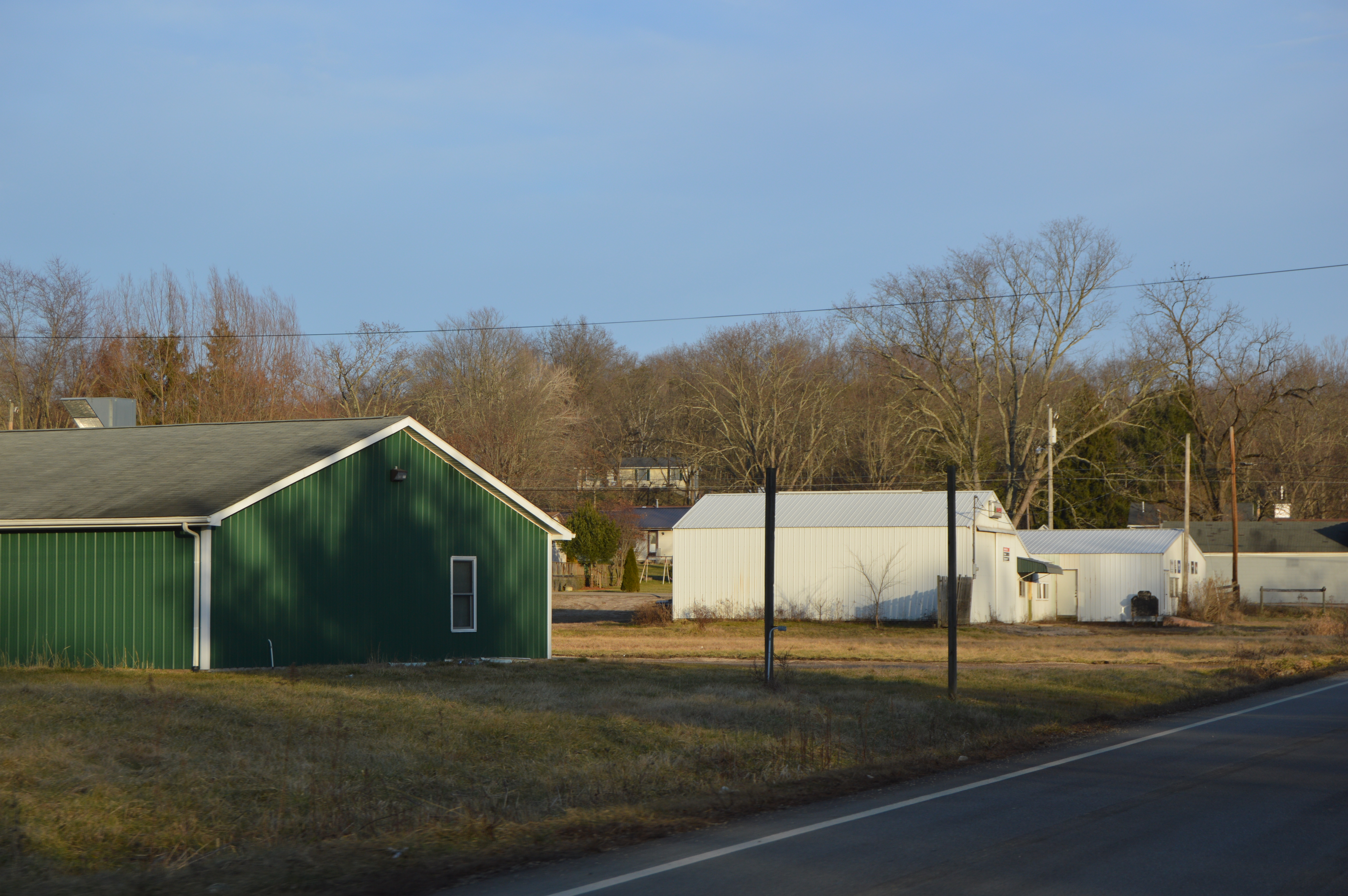
- Buildings on the northern side of Ohio State Route 93 on the western side of Altoona

- Location within Ohio
- Coordinates: 39°06′48″N 82°35′12″W
- Country: United States
- State: Ohio
- Counties: Jackson
- Elevation: 732 ft (223 m)
- Time zone: UTC-5 (Eastern (EST))
  - Summer (DST): UTC-4 (EDT)
- ZIP code: 45692
- Area code: 740
- GNIS feature ID: 1062627

Altoona is an unincorporated community in Coal Township, Jackson County, Ohio, United States. It is located east of Coalton on Ohio State Route 93.
