= Camba, Ohio =

- Unincorporated community
- Location within Ohio
- Coordinates: 38°57′53″N 82°36′19″W
- Country: United States
- State: Ohio
- Counties: Jackson
- Elevation: 738 ft (225 m)
- Time zone: UTC-5 (Eastern (EST))
  - Summer (DST): UTC-4 (EDT)
- ZIP code: 45640
- Area code: 740
- GNIS feature ID: 1075510

Camba is an unincorporated community in Franklin Township, Jackson County, Ohio, United States.
