= Jackson Lake State Park (Ohio) =

Park in Ohio, USA

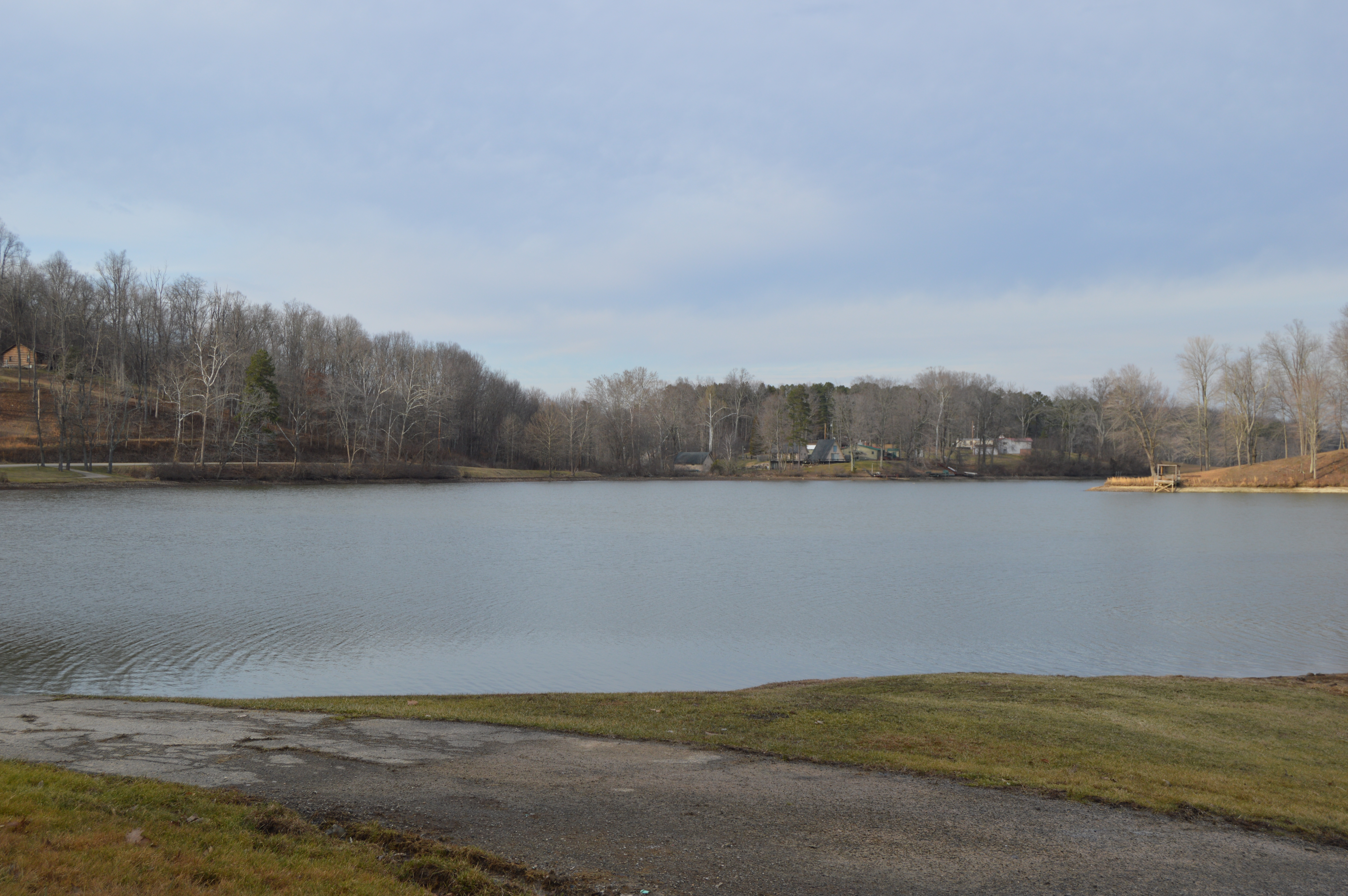
- Jackson Lake

- Location within Ohio Location within the United States
- Location: Jackson County, Ohio, United States
- Coordinates: 38°53′56″N 82°36′05″W
- Area: 106 acres (43 ha)
- Elevation: 860 ft (260 m)
- Established: 1979
- Administrator: Ohio Department of Natural Resources
- Designation: Ohio state park
- Website: Jackson Lake State Park

Jackson Lake State Park is a public recreation area covering 106 acres (43 ha) along the shores of 252-acre (102 ha) Jackson Lake in Jackson County, Ohio, in the United States. Recreational activities available at the park include camping, boating, fishing, swimming and picnicking.

== History ==
The forests in and around Jackson Lake State Park were previously harvested to fire the furnaces of numerous 19th-century iron works that were located in southern Ohio. Remnants of the Jefferson Iron Furnace are found in the park.

The park was established as a state park in 1979. It had previously been a "state reserve", similar to a park but with less development, after a dam was built on Black Fork creating Jackson Lake in 1938. The reserve was home to a small camping area with a beach on the lake. Jackson Lake State Park was established after the facilities were expanded and improved.

== Ecology ==
Jackson Lake State Park is in the Appalachian Highlands region of Ohio. The hilly sandstone region is home to diverse plant and animal populations. The region contains nearly 70% of the woodlands in Ohio. At one time this same region was a barren wasteland that had been stripped of its old growth forests to provide fuel for the iron furnaces. The forests have since regrown with a diversity of hardwoods including hickory, oak, and maple.

A variety of animals are found in Jackson Lake State Park. These animals are protected from hunting in the park. They include most common eastern woodland creatures such as the white-tailed deer, skunks, wild turkeys, opossums, raccoons, eastern gray squirrels, great horned owls and numerous songbirds, reptiles and amphibians. Plant life at the park includes dame's violet, goldenrod, spring beauties and asters.

== Recreation ==
The park offers camping, picnicking, swimming, boating, and fishing. Common game fish in Jackson Lake include carp, bass, bluegill and muskellunge.
