= Clay, Ohio =

- Unincorporated community
- Location within Ohio
- Coordinates: 38°56′07″N 82°34′01″W
- Country: United States
- State: Ohio
- Counties: Jackson
- Elevation: 705 ft (215 m)
- Time zone: UTC-5 (Eastern (EST))
  - Summer (DST): UTC-4 (EDT)
- ZIP code: 45656
- Area code: 740
- GNIS feature ID: 1075581

Clay is an unincorporated community in Franklin Township, Jackson County, Ohio, United States. It is located between Jackson and Oak Hill at the intersection of Ohio State Route 93 and Clay Banner Road/Pyro Road.

The Clay Post Office was established on September 10, 1858, and discontinued on August 31, 1912. Mail service is now handled through the Oak Hill branch.
