= Robert N. Gorman =

American judge

Robert Nestor Gorman

Associate Justice of the Ohio Supreme Court
- In office October, 1937 – November 1938
- Appointed by: Martin L. Davey
- Preceded by: Thomas A. Jones
- Succeeded by: William C. Dixon

Hamilton County Prosecuting Attorney
- In office 1928–1930
- Preceded by: Nelson Schwab
- Succeeded by: Louis J. Schneider

Personal details
- Born: September 27, 1896 Hartwell, Ohio
- Died: July 1, 1962 (aged 65) Wyoming, Ohio
- Resting place: Spring Grove Cemetery
- Party: Democratic
- Spouse: Mary Hartman
- Children: two
- Education: University of Wisconsin–Madison; Harvard University; Harvard Law School

Robert Nestor Gorman (September 27, 1896 – July 1, 1962) was an American judge in Ohio. He was appointed to a seat as a justice of the Ohio Supreme Court in 1937.

== Biography ==
Robert N. Gorman was born in the village of Hartwell, Ohio in 1896. He attended the Hartwell School and the private Franklin School. He entered the University of Wisconsin–Madison in 1914 to study journalism, and transferred to Harvard University in 1916, where he earned an A.B. in 1918.

In the fall of 1918, Gorman entered the Harvard Law School, but had studies interrupted by enlistment in the United States Navy in December, 1918. He was stationed in Boston, Massachusetts, and earned a law degree in 1920, before being honorably discharged in 1921.

After graduation, Gorman returned to Cincinnati, passed the bar exam, and joined the law firm of Peck, Shaffer & Williams. He served as solicitor for the villages of Cleves and Elmwood Place. Gorman drafted the home-rule provision of the revised city charter for Cincinnati.

In 1930, Gorman was elected Prosecutor for Hamilton County, and served a two-year term. He also was a bar examiner for admission to the Ohio Bar. Governor George White appointed him to complete an unexpired term on the Hamilton County Court of Common Pleas in 1934, and he ran for and was elected to a six-year term in 1936, with the term beginning January 1937.

In October, 1937, Governor Martin L. Davey appointed Gorman to a seat on the Ohio Supreme Court caused by the death of Thomas A. Jones. He lost a bid for election to a full six-year term in November, 1938.

Gorman returned to private practice in 1939 in Cincinnati. He served on the board of trustees of The Ohio State University for ten years, until his retirement in 1961. He was president of the board at different times.

In 1958, Gorman ran in the Democratic primary for nomination for Governor, but lost to Michael DiSalle in the May primary.

Gorman married Mary Hartman on December 10, 1926. They had two sons. Gorman died from cancer July 1, 1962 at his home in Wyoming, Ohio, and was interred at Spring Grove Cemetery on July 3.
