= Garfield, Jackson County, Ohio =

Garfield, Ohio
- Unincorporated community
- Location within Ohio
- Coordinates: 39°07′25″N 82°37′12″W
- Country: United States
- State: Ohio
- Counties: Jackson
- Elevation: 692 ft (211 m)
- Time zone: UTC-5 (Eastern (EST))
  - Summer (DST): UTC-4 (EDT)
- ZIP code: 45692
- Area code: 740
- GNIS feature ID: 1048771

Garfield is an unincorporated community in Coal Township, Jackson County, Ohio, United States. It is located just north of Coalton on Sour Run Road, at 39°07′25″N 82°37′12″W.
