= Mulga, Ohio =

- Unincorporated community
- Location within Ohio
- Coordinates: 39°07′02″N 82°28′07″W
- Country: United States
- State: Ohio
- Counties: Jackson
- Elevation: 676 ft (206 m)
- Time zone: UTC-5 (Eastern (EST))
  - Summer (DST): UTC-4 (EDT)
- ZIP code: 45692
- Area code: 740
- GNIS feature ID: 1063391

Mulga is an unincorporated community in Milton Township, Jackson County, Ohio, United States. It is located east of Wellston at the intersection of Hollingshead Road (County Route 40) and Mulga Road (County Route 39), just off Ohio State Route 32, at 39°07′02″N 82°28′07″W.
