= Chapman, Ohio =

- Unincorporated community
- Location within Ohio
- Coordinates: 39°05′21″N 82°37′06″W
- Country: United States
- State: Ohio
- Counties: Jackson
- Elevation: 686 ft (209 m)
- Time zone: UTC-5 (Eastern (EST))
  - Summer (DST): UTC-4 (EDT)
- ZIP code: 45640
- Area code: 740
- GNIS feature ID: 1060950

Chapman is an unincorporated community in Coal Township, Jackson County, Ohio, United States. It is located south of Coalton at 39°05′21″N 82°37′06″W, at the intersection of Ohio State Route 93 and Jackson Hill Road (County Road 36).

The post office was originally established as the Ennis Post Office on January 2, 1883. The name was changed to Chapman Post Office on September 5, 1888, and ultimately discontinued on November 15, 1915. Mail service is now handled by the Coalton branch.
