= Lefty James =

American baseball player (1889-1933)

- Pitcher
- Born: July 1, 1889; Glen Roy, Ohio, U.S.
- Died: May 3, 1933 (aged 43); Glen Roy, Ohio, U.S.
- Batted: Right Threw: Left

MLB debut
- September 20, 1912, for the Cleveland Naps

Last MLB appearance
- July 3, 1914, for the Cleveland Naps

MLB statistics
- Win–loss record: 2–7
- Earned run average: 3.39
- Strikeouts: 36
- Stats at Baseball Reference

Teams
- Cleveland Naps (1912–1914)

William A. "Lefty" James (July 1, 1889 – May 3, 1933) was an American left handed Major League Baseball (MLB) pitcher who played for the Cleveland Naps from 1912 to 1914. He also played 12 seasons in the minor leagues, playing for the Toledo Mud Hens, Cleveland Bearcats, Cleveland Spiders, Louisville Colonels, San Antonio Broncos, Portland Beavers, Beaumont Exporters, New Orleans Pelicans, Atlanta Crackers, Chattanooga Lookouts, and Mobile Bears.

James was born, and died, in Glen Roy, Ohio, and is buried at Ridgewood Cemetery in nearby Wellston.
