= Tom Corwin, Ohio =

- Unincorporated community
- Location within Ohio
- Coordinates: 39°05′56″N 82°34′42″W
- Country: United States
- State: Ohio
- Counties: Jackson
- Elevation: 784 ft (239 m)
- Time zone: UTC-5 (Eastern (EST))
  - Summer (DST): UTC-4 (EDT)
- ZIP code: 45692
- Area code: 740
- GNIS feature ID: 1049247

Tom Corwin is an unincorporated community in Coal Township, Jackson County, Ohio, United States. It is located southwest of Wellston on Ohio State Route 788, at 39°05′56″N 82°34′42″W.

Tom Corwin was settled as a company town for the Tom Corwin Coal Company, which operated multiple mines in the area and shipped the coal out by means of the nearby Cincinnati, Hamilton & Dayton (CH&D) Railway.
