= Buffalo, Jackson County, Ohio =

Buffalo, Ohio
- Unincorporated community
- Location within Ohio
- Coordinates: 39°05′47″N 82°38′54″W
- Country: United States
- State: Ohio
- Counties: Jackson
- Elevation: 732 ft (223 m)
- Time zone: UTC-5 (Eastern (EST))
  - Summer (DST): UTC-4 (EDT)
- ZIP code: 45640
- Area code: 740
- GNIS feature ID: 1062676

Buffalo is an unincorporated community in Coal Township, Jackson County, Ohio, United States. It is located southwest of Coalton, near the intersection of U.S. Route 35 and Jackson Hill Road (County Road 36).
