= Lick Township, Jackson County, Ohio =

Township in Ohio, US

- Township
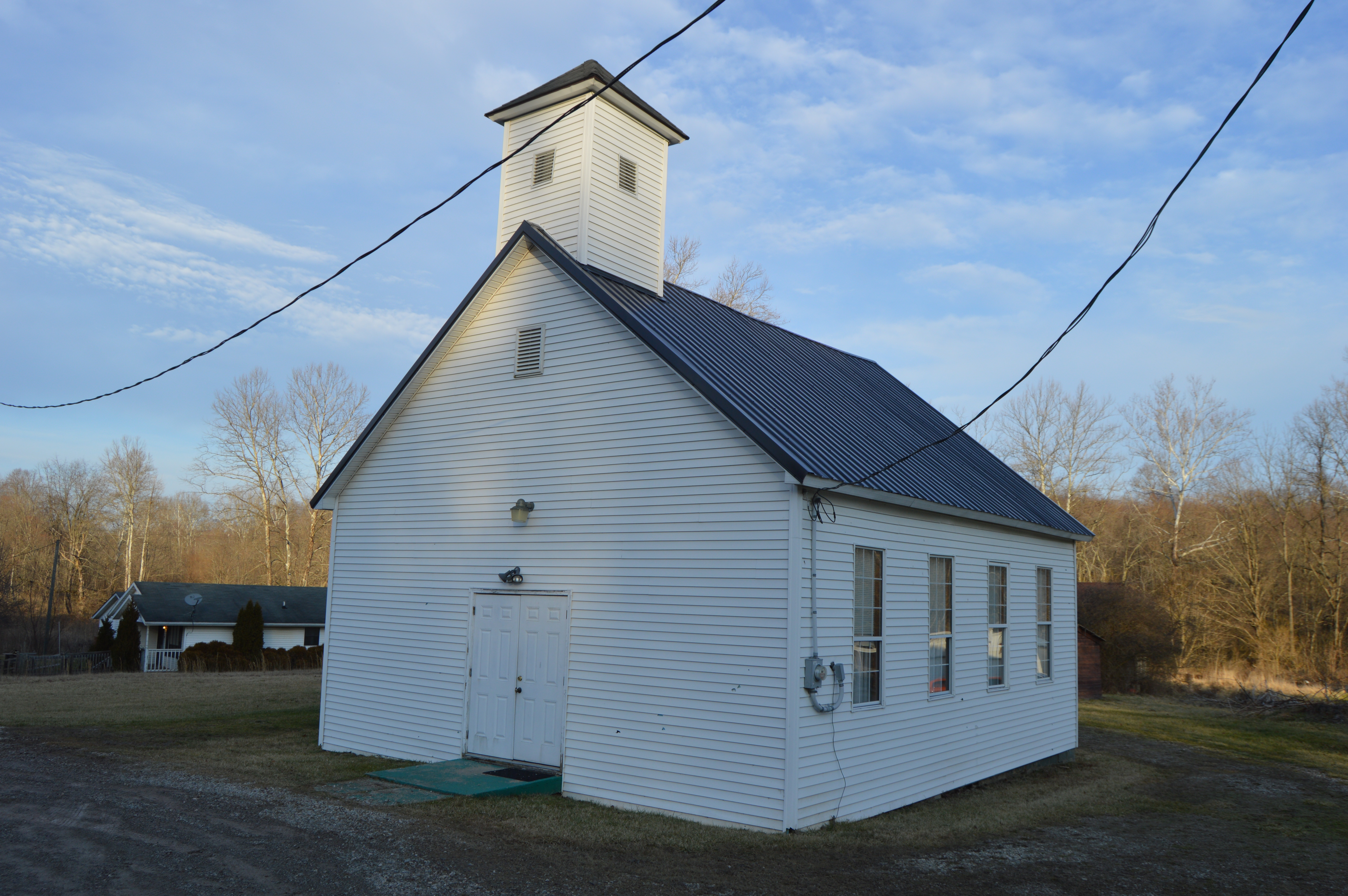
- Columbia Chapel north of Jackson

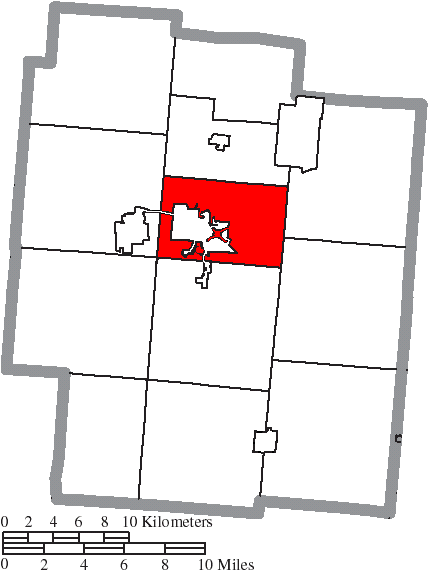
- Location of Lick Township in Jackson County
- Coordinates: 39°3′20″N 82°37′8″W
- Country: United States
- State: Ohio
- County: Jackson

Area
  - Total: 20.2 sq mi (52.2 km^{2})
  - Land: 20.2 sq mi (52.2 km^{2})
  - Water: 0 sq mi (0.0 km^{2})
- Elevation: 650 ft (198 m)

Population (2020)
  - Total: 2,600
  - Density: 130/sq mi (50/km^{2})
- Time zone: UTC-5 (Eastern (EST))
  - Summer (DST): UTC-4 (EDT)
- FIPS code: 39-43442
- GNIS feature ID: 1086370

Lick Township is one of the twelve townships of Jackson County, Ohio, United States. As of the 2020 census, 2,600 people lived in the township.

== Geography ==
Located in the center of the county, it borders the following townships:

- Coal Township: north
- Milton Township: northeast
- Bloomfield Township: southeast
- Franklin Township: south
- Scioto Township: southwest corner
- Liberty Township: west

Lick Township lies between the two other Jackson County townships that do not border other counties: Coal Township to the north, and Franklin Township to the south.

Much of the city of Jackson, the county seat of Jackson County, is located in Lick Township.

== Name and history ==
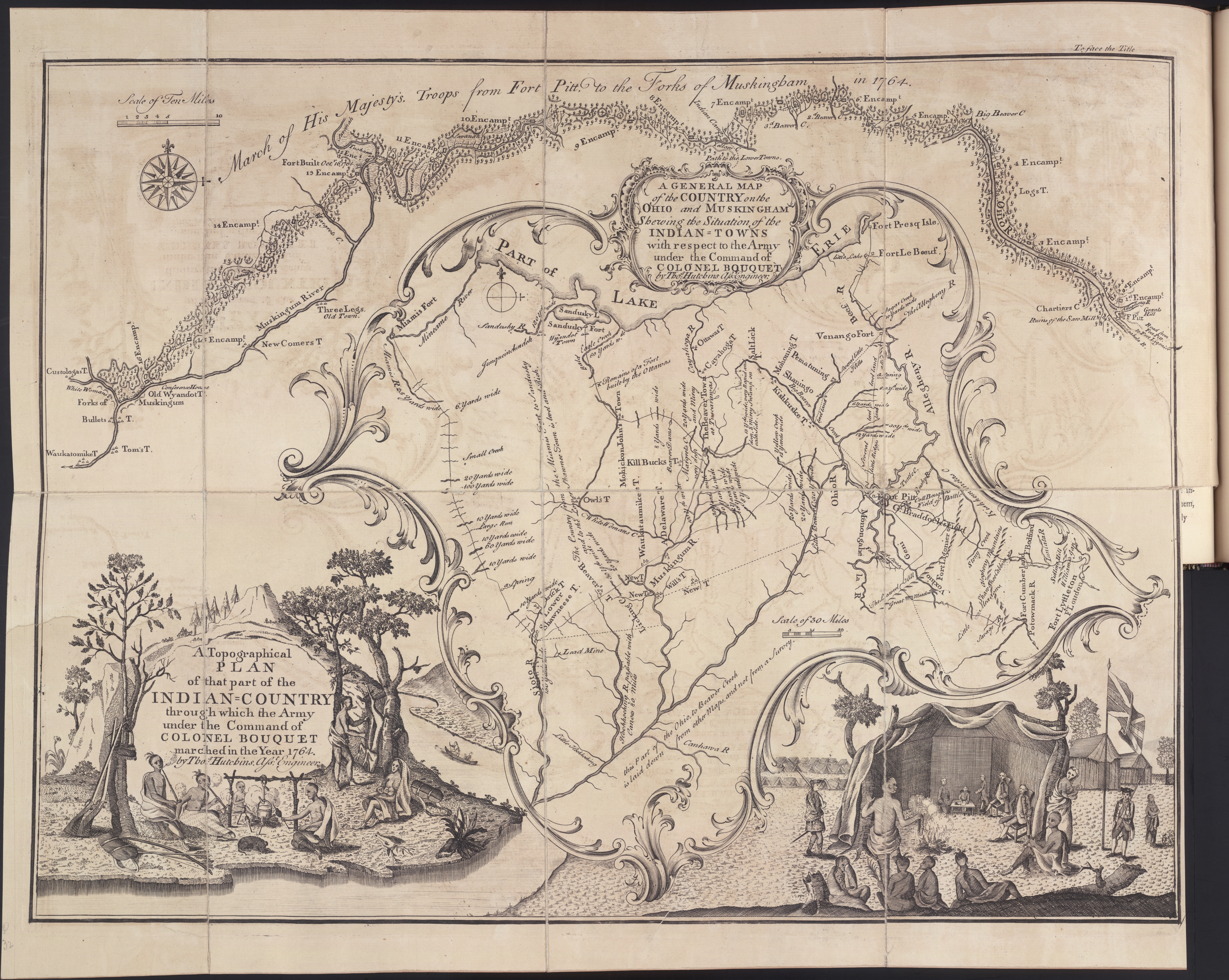
Thomas Hutchins' map of Henry Bouquet's 1764 expedition to Ohio showing "Lick T." just below the center of the page.

Lick Township was organized as an original township of Jackson County, and named for the salt licks within its borders. It is the only Lick Township statewide, although there are Licking Townships in Licking and Muskingum counties. The first map showing the town is a 1764 map of Henry Bouquet's expedition to Ohio, which places "Lick T." on the upper Scioto.

== Government ==
The township is governed by a three-member board of trustees, who are elected in November of odd-numbered years to a four-year term beginning on the following January 1. Two are elected in the year after the presidential election and one is elected in the year before it. There is also an elected township fiscal officer, who serves a four-year term beginning on April 1 of the year after the election, which is held in November of the year before the presidential election. Vacancies in the fiscal officership or on the board of trustees are filled by the remaining trustees.
