= Ratchford, Ohio =

- Unincorporated community
- Location within Ohio
- Coordinates: 39°07′15″N 82°30′21″W
- Country: United States
- State: Ohio
- Counties: Jackson
- Elevation: 741 ft (226 m)
- Time zone: UTC-5 (Eastern (EST))
  - Summer (DST): UTC-4 (EDT)
- ZIP code: 45692
- Area code: 740
- GNIS feature ID: 1057945

Ratchford is an unincorporated community in Milton Township, Jackson County, Ohio, United States. It is located between Wellston and Wainwright on Mulga Road, at 39°07′15″N 82°30′21″W.

The Ratchford Post Office was established on March 15, 1900 and discontinued on March 15, 1907. Mail service is now handled through the Wellston branch.
