= Comet, Jackson County, Ohio =

Comet, Ohio
- Unincorporated community
- Location within Ohio
- Coordinates: 39°06′57″N 82°33′04″W
- Country: United States
- State: Ohio
- Counties: Jackson
- Elevation: 741 ft (226 m)
- Time zone: UTC-5 (Eastern (EST))
  - Summer (DST): UTC-4 (EDT)
- ZIP code: 45692
- Area code: 740
- GNIS feature ID: 1048619

Comet is an unincorporated community in Washington Township, Jackson County, Ohio, United States. It is located at 39°06′57″N 82°33′04″W, on the western edge of Wellston.

Comet was originally founded along the Ohio Southern Railroad as a company town for the Comet Coal Company, operating the Comet mine nearby. As of 1895, there were 60 miners and 24 day-laborers employed at the mine.
