= Scioto Township, Jackson County, Ohio =

Township in Ohio, US

- Township
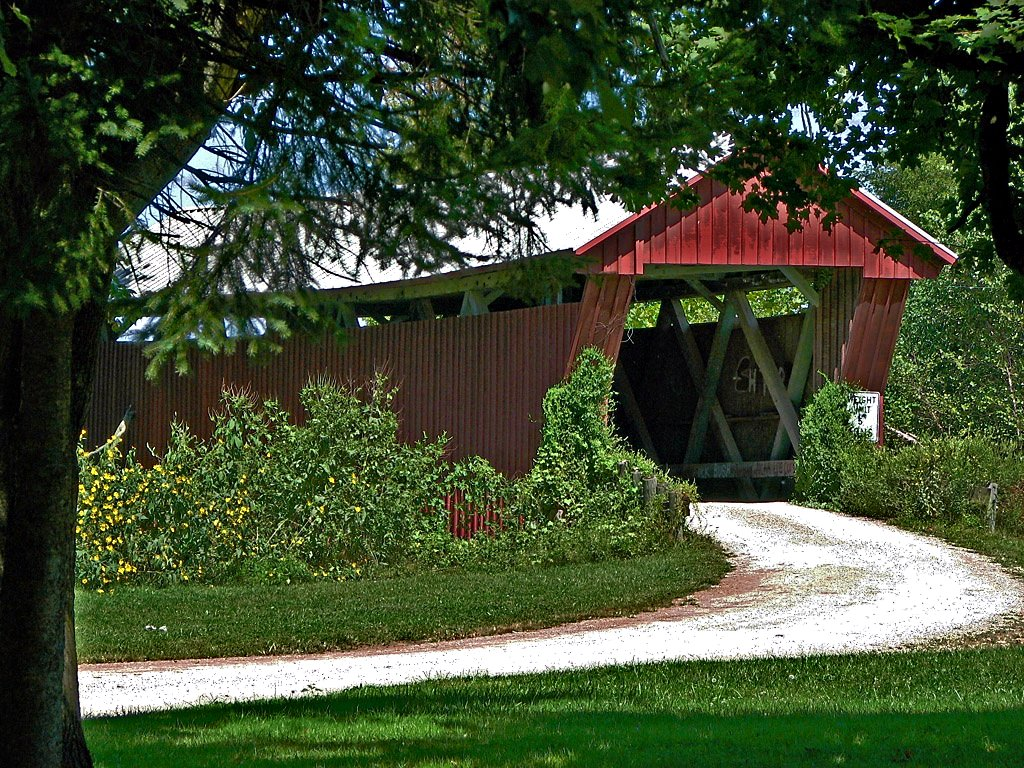
- Johnson Road Covered Bridge, a township landmark

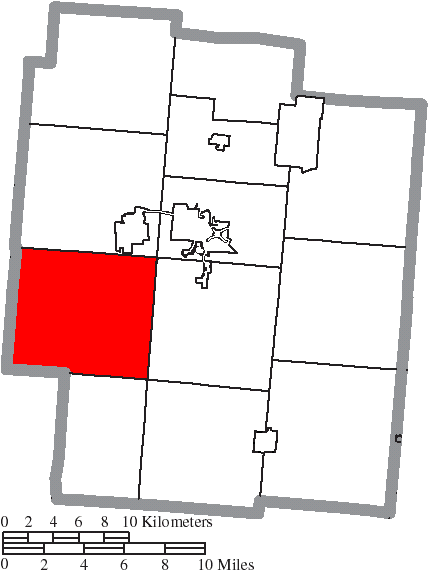
- Location of Scioto Township in Jackson County
- Coordinates: 38°59′29″N 82°44′56″W
- Country: United States
- State: Ohio
- County: Jackson

Area
  - Total: 42.4 sq mi (109.7 km^{2})
  - Land: 42.3 sq mi (109.6 km^{2})
  - Water: 0.077 sq mi (0.2 km^{2})
- Elevation: 837 ft (255 m)

Population (2020)
  - Total: 1,949
  - Density: 46.06/sq mi (17.78/km^{2})
- Time zone: UTC-5 (Eastern (EST))
  - Summer (DST): UTC-4 (EDT)
- FIPS code: 39-70856
- GNIS feature ID: 1086373

Historical population
Census	Pop.	Note	%±
1990	1,432		—
2000	1,788		24.9%
2010	1,921		7.4%
2020	1,949		1.5%
U.S. Census:

Scioto Township is one of the twelve townships of Jackson County, Ohio, United States. As of the 2020 census, 1,949 people lived in the township.

== Geography ==
Located in the western part of the county, it borders the following townships:

- Liberty Township: north
- Lick Township: northeast corner
- Franklin Township: east
- Jefferson Township: southeast corner
- Hamilton Township: south
- Madison Township, Scioto County: southwest
- Marion Township, Pike County: west
- Beaver Township, Pike County: northwest

No municipalities are located in Scioto Township.

== Name and history ==
Scioto Township was organized in 1816, and named after the Scioto River. It is one of five Scioto Townships statewide.

== Government ==
The township is governed by a three-member board of trustees, who are elected in November of odd-numbered years to a four-year term beginning on the following January 1. Two are elected in the year after the presidential election and one is elected in the year before it. There is also an elected township fiscal officer, who serves a four-year term beginning on April 1 of the year after the election, which is held in November of the year before the presidential election. Vacancies in the fiscal officership or on the board of trustees are filled by the remaining trustees.
