= Jackson County, Ohio =

County in Ohio, United States

- County
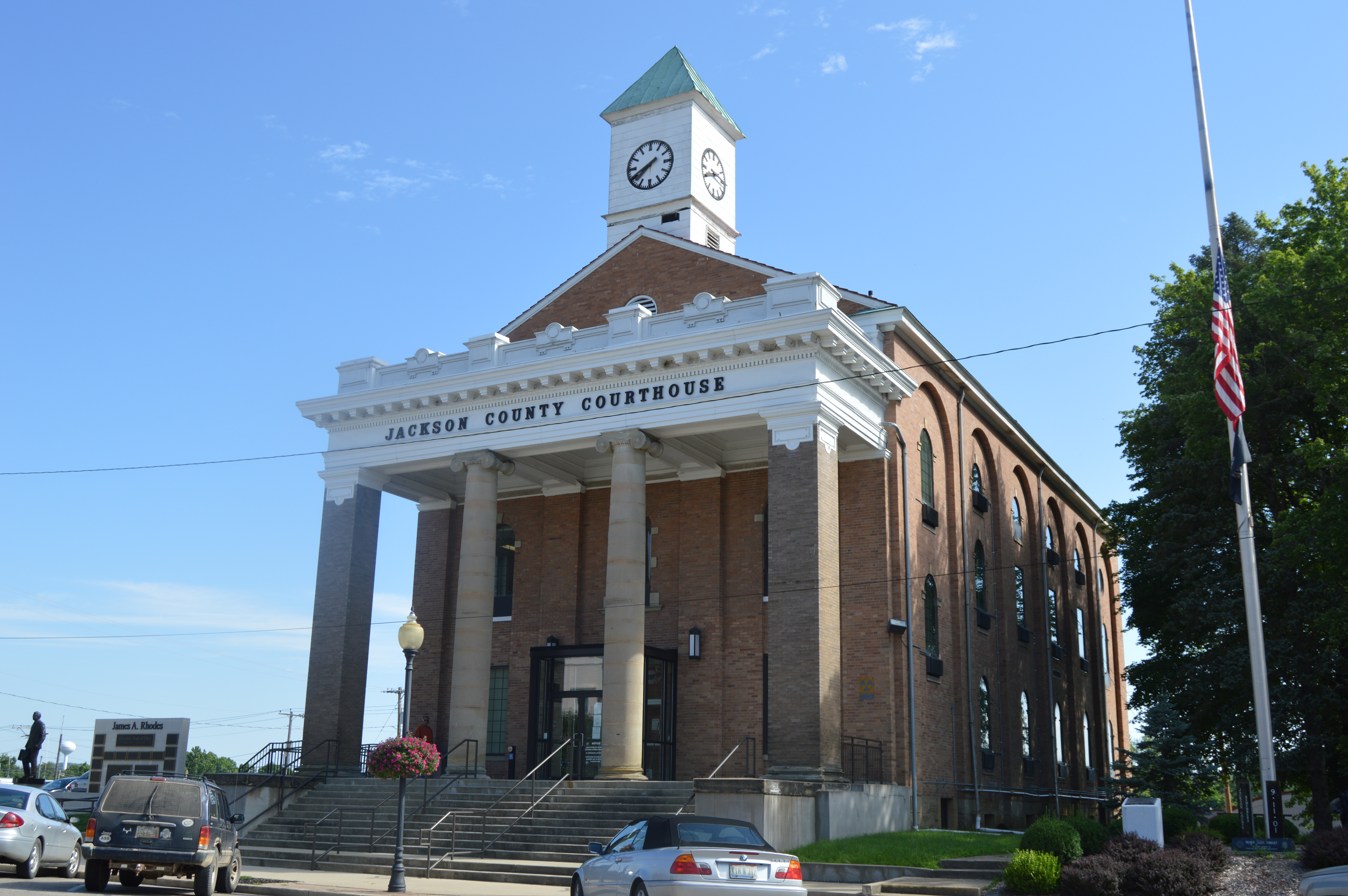
- Jackson County Courthouse

- Seal

- Location within the U.S. state of Ohio
- Coordinates: 39°01′N 82°37′W
- Country: United States
- State: Ohio
- Founded: March 1, 1816
- Named for: Andrew Jackson
- Seat: Jackson
- Largest city: Jackson

Area
  - Total: 422 sq mi (1,090 km^{2})
  - Land: 420 sq mi (1,100 km^{2})
  - Water: 1.2 sq mi (3.1 km^{2}) 0.3%

Population (2020)
  - Total: 32,653
  - Estimate (2025): 32,817 ▲
  - Density: 78/sq mi (30/km^{2})
- Time zone: UTC−5 (Eastern)
  - Summer (DST): UTC−4 (EDT)
- Congressional district: 2nd
- Website: www.jacksoncountyohio.us

Jackson County is a county located in the U.S. state of Ohio. As of the 2020 census, the population was 32,653. Its county seat is Jackson. The county is named for Andrew Jackson, a hero of the War of 1812 who was subsequently elected President of the United States. It is known as "The Little Wales of Ohio".

== History ==
Jackson County is north of the Ohio River in eastern Ohio, an area that was long occupied by various tribes of Native Americans. Evidence of this era in the Ohio Valley is found in the area's large burial and ceremonial mounds and petroglyphs including the Leo Petroglyph.

Tribes that inhabited the area in the Colonial period included with Mingo, Lenape, and Shawnee. Westward expansion by American pioneers displaced the Indigenous People who were killed in wars or relocated to the Great Plains and placed on reservations following the passage of the Indian Removal Act. The pioneer settlers cleared the land for farming and developed industries around which towns and cities grew.

Iron ore was discovered in southern Ohio in the mid-19th century. The combination of deposits of ore and vast stands of old-growth forests made the Hanging Rock Iron Region ideally suited for the iron industry. The Jefferson Iron Furnace was constructed in 1854. It met the growing demand for iron in the developing United States of America. The importance of the furnaces in the Hanging Rock region grew tremendously during the American Civil War. Iron produced in Jackson County was sold to manufacturers under the trademark "Anchor". This iron was used to build the USS Monitor, an ironclad warship made famous by its contest against the CSS Virginia, a Confederate ironclad sometimes known as the Merrimack, at the Battle of Hampton Roads.

The era of iron production in Jackson County began to wane in the years following the Civil War. Demand for iron outstripped the resources in the Hanging Rock Iron Region. Ore deposits had been cleared and what remained was minimal and difficult to extract. Also, much of the forested land had been cleared to provide charcoal to fire the furnaces. A combination of a lack of ore and charcoal helped bring about the end of the iron era. Remnants of the Jefferson Iron Furnaces are found in Jackson Lake State Park.

Other industries that were in the area included coal mining and salt mining. Over a million tons of coal were mined in 1888. Jackson County was the second leading coal producing county in the state during the coal mining era. Salt mines along Salt Creek were set aside "by Congress for the use of the state to secure the salt". Indian tribes also used the area and came from great distances to gather salt.

== Geography ==
According to the U.S. Census Bureau, the county has a total area of 422 square miles (1,090 km^{2}), of which 420 square miles (1,100 km^{2}) is land and 1.2 square miles (3.1 km^{2}) (0.3%) is water.

=== Adjacent counties ===
- Vinton County (north)
- Gallia County (east)
- Lawrence County (south)
- Scioto County (southwest)
- Pike County (west)
- Ross County (northwest)

=== National protected areas ===
- Wayne National Forest (part)

== Demographics ==
Historical population
| Census | Pop. | Note | %± |
|---|---|---|---|
| 1820 | 3,746 | | — |
| 1830 | 5,941 | | 58.6% |
| 1840 | 9,744 | | 64.0% |
| 1850 | 12,719 | | 30.5% |
| 1860 | 17,941 | | 41.1% |
| 1870 | 21,759 | | 21.3% |
| 1880 | 23,686 | | 8.9% |
| 1890 | 28,408 | | 19.9% |
| 1900 | 34,248 | | 20.6% |
| 1910 | 30,791 | | −10.1% |
| 1920 | 27,342 | | −11.2% |
| 1930 | 25,040 | | −8.4% |
| 1940 | 27,004 | | 7.8% |
| 1950 | 27,767 | | 2.8% |
| 1960 | 29,372 | | 5.8% |
| 1970 | 27,174 | | −7.5% |
| 1980 | 30,592 | | 12.6% |
| 1990 | 30,230 | | −1.2% |
| 2000 | 32,641 | | 8.0% |
| 2010 | 33,225 | | 1.8% |
| 2020 | 32,653 | | −1.7% |
| 2025 (est.) | 32,817 | ▲ | 0.5% |
U.S. Decennial Census; 1790–1960 1900–1990; 1990–2000 2020

=== Racial and ethnic composition ===
Jackson County, Ohio – Racial and ethnic composition Note: the US Census treats Hispanic/Latino as an ethnic category. This table excludes Latinos from the racial categories and assigns them to a separate category. Hispanics/Latinos may be of any race.
| Race / ethnicity (NH = Non-Hispanic) | Pop 1980 | Pop 1990 | Pop 2000 | Pop 2010 | Pop 2020 | % 1980 | % 1990 | % 2000 | % 2010 | % 2020 |
|---|---|---|---|---|---|---|---|---|---|---|
| White alone (NH) | 30,205 | 29,828 | 31,832 | 32,096 | 30,835 | 98.73% | 98.67% | 97.52% | 96.60% | 94.43% |
| Black or African American alone (NH) | 207 | 217 | 192 | 191 | 158 | 0.68% | 0.72% | 0.59% | 0.57% | 0.48% |
| Native American or Alaska Native alone (NH) | 24 | 52 | 92 | 115 | 88 | 0.08% | 0.17% | 0.28% | 0.35% | 0.27% |
| Asian alone (NH) | 22 | 36 | 56 | 109 | 101 | 0.07% | 0.12% | 0.17% | 0.33% | 0.31% |
| Native Hawaiian or Pacific Islander alone (NH) | x | x | 6 | 12 | 1 | x | x | 0.02% | 0.04% | 0.00% |
| Other race alone (NH) | 24 | 8 | 11 | 15 | 50 | 0.08% | 0.03% | 0.03% | 0.05% | 0.15% |
| Mixed race or Multiracial (NH) | x | x | 255 | 422 | 1,114 | x | x | 0.78% | 1.27% | 3.41% |
| Hispanic or Latino (any race) | 110 | 89 | 197 | 265 | 306 | 0.36% | 0.29% | 0.60% | 0.80% | 0.94% |
| Total | 30,592 | 30,230 | 32,641 | 33,225 | 32,653 | 100.00% | 100.00% | 100.00% | 100.00% | 100.00% |

=== 2020 census ===
As of the 2020 census, the county had a population of 32,653. The median age was 40.8 years. 23.7% of residents were under the age of 18 and 18.4% of residents were 65 years of age or older. For every 100 females there were 96.8 males, and for every 100 females age 18 and over there were 93.7 males age 18 and over.

The racial makeup of the county was 94.8% White, 0.5% Black or African American, 0.3% American Indian and Alaska Native, 0.3% Asian, <0.1% Native Hawaiian and Pacific Islander, 0.3% from some other race, and 3.8% from two or more races. Hispanic or Latino residents of any race comprised 0.9% of the population.

35.8% of residents lived in urban areas, while 64.2% lived in rural areas.

There were 12,936 households in the county, of which 30.9% had children under the age of 18 living in them. Of all households, 47.3% were married-couple households, 17.8% were households with a male householder and no spouse or partner present, and 26.8% were households with a female householder and no spouse or partner present. About 27.5% of all households were made up of individuals and 13.3% had someone living alone who was 65 years of age or older.

There were 14,399 housing units, of which 10.2% were vacant. Among occupied housing units, 70.1% were owner-occupied and 29.9% were renter-occupied. The homeowner vacancy rate was 1.6% and the rental vacancy rate was 6.0%.

=== 2010 census ===
As of the 2010 United States census, there were 33,225 people, 13,010 households, and 9,028 families living in the county. The population density was 79.0 inhabitants per square mile (30.5/km^{2}). There were 14,587 housing units at an average density of 34.7 units per square mile (13.4 units/km^{2}). The racial makeup of the county was 97.1% white, 0.6% black or African American, 0.4% American Indian, 0.3% Asian, 0.2% from other races, and 1.4% from two or more races. Those of Hispanic or Latino origin made up 0.8% of the population. In terms of ancestry, 16.1% were German, 12.3% were American, 11.6% were Irish, 10.6% were English and 4.4% were Welsh.

Of the 13,010 households, 33.9% had children under the age of 18 living with them, 50.9% were married couples living together, 12.7% had a female householder with no husband present, 30.6% were non-families, and 25.9% of all households were made up of individuals. The average household size was 2.53 and the average family size was 3.01. The median age was 39.0 years.

The median income for a household in the county was $34,044 and the median income for a family was $42,560. Males had a median income of $36,910 versus $28,618 for females. The per capita income for the county was $18,775. About 18.1% of families and 23.3% of the population were below the poverty line, including 36.5% of those under age 18 and 11.5% of those age 65 or over.

=== 2000 census ===
As of the census of 2000, there were 32,641 people, 12,619 households, and 9,136 families living in the county. The population density was 78 people per square mile (30 people/km^{2}). There were 13,909 housing units at an average density of 33 units per square mile (13/km^{2}). The racial makeup of the county was 97.89% White, 0.59% Black or African American, 0.34% Native American, 0.17% Asian, 0.02% Pacific Islander, 0.16% from other races, and 0.82% from two or more races. 0.60% of the population were Hispanic or Latino of any race. In 2010 16.5% were of German, 12.9% American, 11.3% Irish, 10.4% English, 5.2% Welsh, 2.4% Scottish, and 1.6% Ulster Scot.

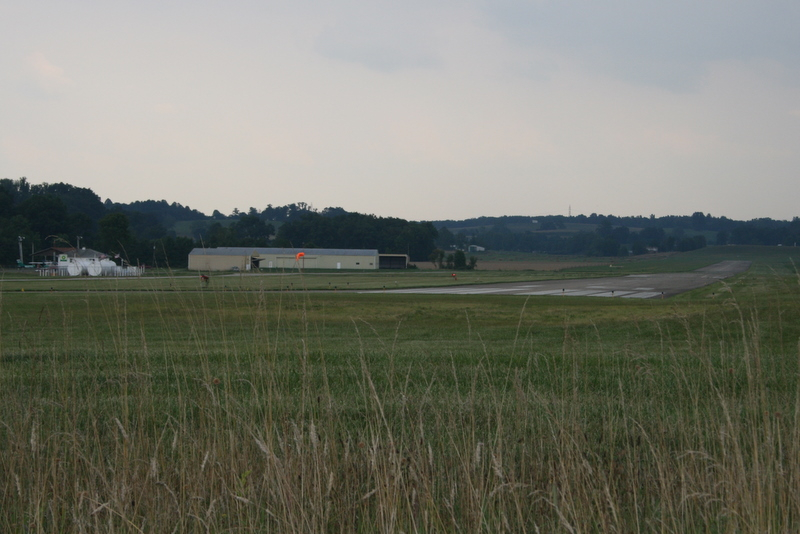
Jackson County, Ohio Airport (James A. Rhodes Airport)

There were 12,619 households, out of which 34.5% had children under the age of 18 living with them, 55.4% were married couples living together, 12.0% had a female householder with no husband present, and 27.6% were non-families. 24.0% of all households were made up of individuals, and 10.5% had someone living alone who was 65 years of age or older. The average household size was 2.55 and the average family size was 3.00.

In the county, the population was spread out, with 26.0% under the age of 18, 8.7% from 18 to 24, 28.7% from 25 to 44, 23.0% from 45 to 64, and 13.6% who were 65 years of age or older. The median age was 36 years. For every 100 females there were 93.2 males. For every 100 females age 18 and over, there were 89.9 males.

The median income for a household in the county was $30,661, and the median income for a family was $36,022. Males had a median income of $30,651 versus $21,546 for females. The per capita income for the county was $14,789. About 13.6% of families and 16.5% of the population were below the poverty line, including 20.3% of those under age 18 and 16.1% of those age 65 or over.

== Politics ==
Jackson County typically leans Republican in presidential elections.

United States presidential election results for Jackson County, Ohio
| Year | Republican | | Democratic | | Third party(ies) | |
| Year | No. | % | No. | % | No. | % |
|---|---|---|---|---|---|---|
| 1856 | 938 | 34.27% | 1,383 | 50.53% | 416 | 15.20% |
| 1860 | 1,738 | 53.17% | 1,436 | 43.93% | 95 | 2.91% |
| 1864 | 1,957 | 59.77% | 1,317 | 40.23% | 0 | 0.00% |
| 1868 | 2,083 | 56.37% | 1,612 | 43.63% | 0 | 0.00% |
| 1872 | 2,258 | 58.83% | 1,555 | 40.52% | 25 | 0.65% |
| 1876 | 2,522 | 56.24% | 1,954 | 43.58% | 8 | 0.18% |
| 1880 | 2,763 | 57.04% | 2,031 | 41.93% | 50 | 1.03% |
| 1884 | 3,427 | 55.97% | 2,575 | 42.05% | 121 | 1.98% |
| 1888 | 3,570 | 53.67% | 2,628 | 39.51% | 454 | 6.83% |
| 1892 | 3,323 | 51.36% | 2,622 | 40.53% | 525 | 8.11% |
| 1896 | 4,439 | 53.46% | 3,786 | 45.59% | 79 | 0.95% |
| 1900 | 4,932 | 58.89% | 3,313 | 39.56% | 130 | 1.55% |
| 1904 | 5,353 | 69.12% | 2,072 | 26.76% | 319 | 4.12% |
| 1908 | 4,489 | 55.84% | 3,235 | 40.24% | 315 | 3.92% |
| 1912 | 1,860 | 30.06% | 2,049 | 33.12% | 2,278 | 36.82% |
| 1916 | 3,116 | 50.23% | 2,922 | 47.11% | 165 | 2.66% |
| 1920 | 5,949 | 54.43% | 4,878 | 44.63% | 102 | 0.93% |
| 1924 | 5,977 | 61.45% | 2,848 | 29.28% | 902 | 9.27% |
| 1928 | 7,129 | 71.40% | 2,775 | 27.79% | 81 | 0.81% |
| 1932 | 6,932 | 55.06% | 5,543 | 44.03% | 115 | 0.91% |
| 1936 | 6,853 | 50.04% | 6,802 | 49.67% | 39 | 0.28% |
| 1940 | 7,551 | 54.20% | 6,382 | 45.80% | 0 | 0.00% |
| 1944 | 6,786 | 59.26% | 4,666 | 40.74% | 0 | 0.00% |
| 1948 | 5,782 | 53.17% | 5,059 | 46.52% | 33 | 0.30% |
| 1952 | 7,223 | 59.18% | 4,983 | 40.82% | 0 | 0.00% |
| 1956 | 8,106 | 64.65% | 4,432 | 35.35% | 0 | 0.00% |
| 1960 | 7,973 | 58.96% | 5,549 | 41.04% | 0 | 0.00% |
| 1964 | 4,949 | 41.22% | 7,056 | 58.78% | 0 | 0.00% |
| 1968 | 5,870 | 53.52% | 4,021 | 36.66% | 1,077 | 9.82% |
| 1972 | 7,351 | 67.30% | 3,410 | 31.22% | 162 | 1.48% |
| 1976 | 5,987 | 46.69% | 6,699 | 52.25% | 136 | 1.06% |
| 1980 | 5,902 | 55.06% | 4,409 | 41.13% | 408 | 3.81% |
| 1984 | 7,411 | 62.24% | 4,369 | 36.69% | 128 | 1.07% |
| 1988 | 6,671 | 59.21% | 4,505 | 39.98% | 91 | 0.81% |
| 1992 | 5,422 | 42.09% | 5,016 | 38.94% | 2,445 | 18.98% |
| 1996 | 4,922 | 40.69% | 5,538 | 45.79% | 1,635 | 13.52% |
| 2000 | 6,958 | 55.71% | 5,131 | 41.08% | 401 | 3.21% |
| 2004 | 8,585 | 59.89% | 5,700 | 39.77% | 49 | 0.34% |
| 2008 | 8,219 | 58.51% | 5,397 | 38.42% | 431 | 3.07% |
| 2012 | 7,904 | 58.97% | 5,166 | 38.54% | 334 | 2.49% |
| 2016 | 9,949 | 72.22% | 3,226 | 23.42% | 601 | 4.36% |
| 2020 | 11,309 | 76.36% | 3,311 | 22.36% | 190 | 1.28% |
| 2024 | 11,249 | 78.49% | 2,953 | 20.60% | 130 | 0.91% |

United States Senate election results for Jackson County, Ohio1
| Year | Republican | | Democratic | | Third party(ies) | |
| Year | No. | % | No. | % | No. | % |
|---|---|---|---|---|---|---|
| 2024 | 10,299 | 72.95% | 3,346 | 23.70% | 472 | 3.34% |

== Government ==
Jackson County has a three-member Board of County Commissioners that administers and oversees the various County departments, similar to all but two of the 88 Ohio counties.

Jackson County's elected officials are:

- County Commissioners: Ed Armstrong (R), Jon Hensler (R), and Paul Haller (R)
- County Auditor: Tiffany Ridgeway (R)
- Clerk Of Courts: Seth Michael (R)
- Common Pleas Court: Judge Christopher Regan (R)
- County Coroner: Dr. Alice Frazier (R)
- County Engineer: Melissa Miller, P.E., P.S. (R)
- Juvenile Court: Judge Justin W. Skaggs
- Municipal Court: Judge Randy H. Dupree (R)
- Probate Court: Judge Justin W. Skaggs
- Prosecuting Attorney: Justin Lovett (R)
- County Recorder: Rose Cherrington Walters (R)
- County Sheriff: Tedd Frazier (R)
- County Treasurer: B. Lee Hubbard, CPA (R)

== Communities ==
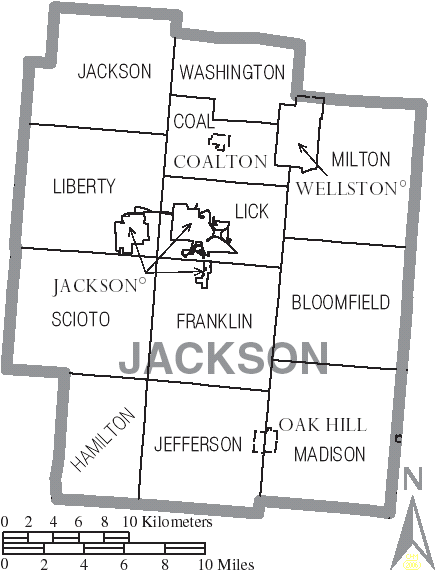
Map of Jackson County, Ohio with Municipal and Township Labels

=== Cities ===
- Jackson (county seat)
- Wellston

=== Villages ===
- Coalton
- Oak Hill

=== Townships ===
- Bloomfield
- Coal
- Franklin
- Hamilton
- Jackson
- Jefferson
- Liberty
- Lick
- Madison
- Milton
- Scioto
- Washington

=== Unincorporated communities ===
- Altoona
- Banner
- Big Rock
- Blackfork Junction
- Brocks Corner
- Buckeye
- Buffalo
- Byer
- Camba
- Chapman
- Clay
- Comet
- Davisville
- Englishville
- Four Mile
- Garfield
- Glade
- Glen Nell
- Glen Roy
- Goldsboro
- Horeb
- Jackson Heights
- Jonestown
- Keystone
- Kitchen
- Leo
- Lesmil
- Limerick
- Mabee Corner
- Monroe
- Mulga
- Oakland
- Orpheus
- Pattonsville
- Petersburg
- Petrea
- Pyro
- Ratchford
- Rempel
- Roads
- Rocky Hill
- Savageville
- Tom Corwin
- Wainwright
- Winchester
- Vega

== See also ==
- Jackson County Apple Festival
- National Register of Historic Places listings in Jackson County, Ohio
