= Roads, Ohio =

- Unincorporated community
- Location within Ohio
- Coordinates: 39°04′52″N 82°32′17″W
- Country: United States
- State: Ohio
- Counties: Jackson
- Elevation: 732 ft (223 m)
- Time zone: UTC-5 (Eastern (EST))
  - Summer (DST): UTC-4 (EDT)
- ZIP code: 45692
- Area code: 740
- GNIS feature ID: 1061615

Roads (previously Berlin Crossroads) is an unincorporated community in Milton Township, Jackson County, Ohio, United States, south of Wellston around the intersection of Ohio State Route 327 and Ohio State Route 124, at 39°04′52″N 82°32′17″W.

Settled by Germans and originally called Berlin X Roads, the post office was established on June 28, 1850, and stayed in service under that name until December 30, 1933. As of 1901, it was known as Berlin Cross Roads.

After World War II, due to hard feelings toward Nazi Germany, the "Berlin Cross" part was dropped and, in 1962, the United States Geological Survey registered it under its current name, with a population of 130.
