= Rempel, Ohio =

- Unincorporated community
- Location within Ohio
- Coordinates: 38°56′10″N 82°31′16″W
- Country: United States
- State: Ohio
- Counties: Jackson
- Elevation: 676 ft (206 m)
- Time zone: UTC-5 (Eastern (EST))
  - Summer (DST): UTC-4 (EDT)
- ZIP code: 45656
- Area code: 740
- GNIS feature ID: 1065524

Rempel (previously known as Madison Furnace) is an unincorporated community in Madison Township, Jackson County, Ohio, United States. It is located southeast of Jackson at the intersection of C H and D Road, Rempel Road, and Vega Road, at 38°56′10″N 82°31′16″W.
