= Liberty Township, Jackson County, Ohio =

Township in Ohio, US

- Township
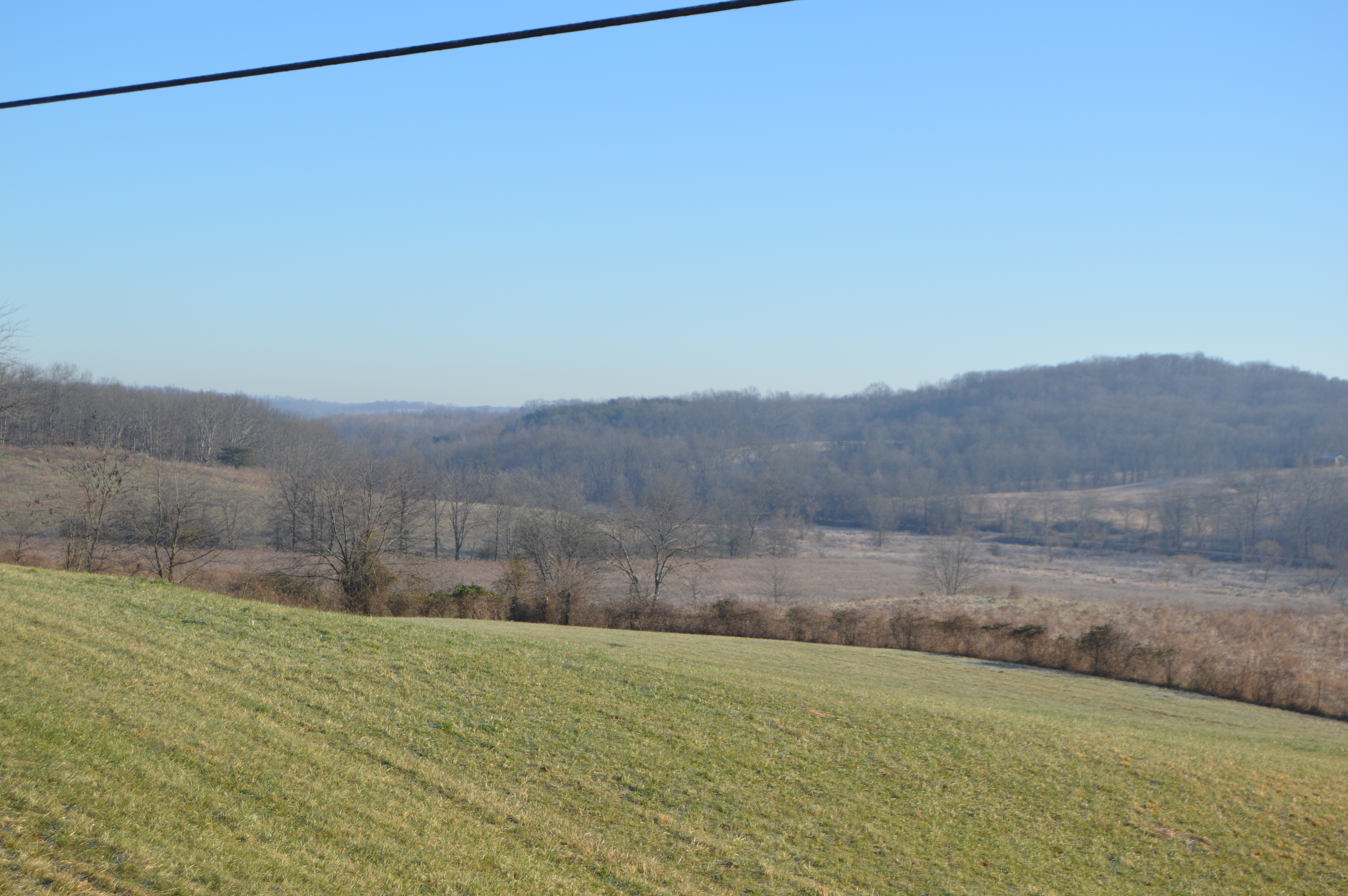
- Countryside in the township's southwest

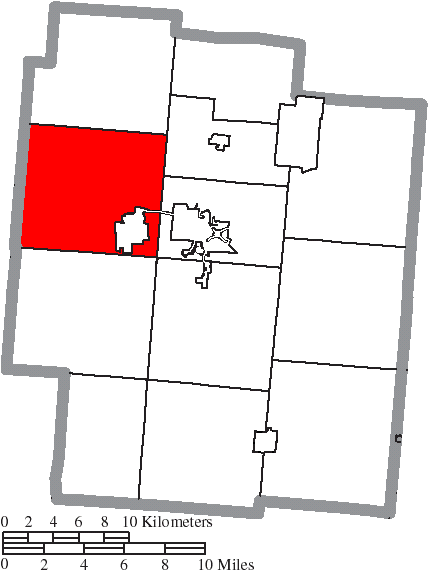
- Location of Liberty Township in Jackson County
- Coordinates: 39°4′21″N 82°42′43″W
- Country: United States
- State: Ohio
- County: Jackson

Area
  - Total: 40.7 sq mi (105.4 km^{2})
  - Land: 40.5 sq mi (105.0 km^{2})
  - Water: 0.15 sq mi (0.4 km^{2})
- Elevation: 840 ft (256 m)

Population (2020)
  - Total: 1,811
  - Density: 44.67/sq mi (17.25/km^{2})
- Time zone: UTC-5 (Eastern (EST))
  - Summer (DST): UTC-4 (EDT)
- FIPS code: 39-43204
- GNIS feature ID: 1086369

Liberty Township is one of the twelve townships of Jackson County, Ohio, United States. As of the 2020 census, 1,811 people lived in the township.

== Geography ==
Located in the western part of the county, it borders the following townships:

- Jackson Township: north
- Coal Township: northeast
- Lick Township: east
- Franklin Township: southeast corner
- Scioto Township: south
- Beaver Township, Pike County: southwest
- Jackson Township, Pike County: northwest

Some areas of southeastern Liberty Township are occupied by parts of the city of Jackson, the county seat of Jackson County.

== Name and history ==
It is one of twenty-five Liberty Townships statewide.

== Government ==
The township is governed by a three-member board of trustees, who are elected in November of odd-numbered years to a four-year term beginning on the following January 1. Two are elected in the year after the presidential election and one is elected in the year before it. There is also an elected township fiscal officer, who serves a four-year term beginning on April 1 of the year after the election, which is held in November of the year before the presidential election. Vacancies in the fiscal officership or on the board of trustees are filled by the remaining trustees.
