= Jefferson Township, Jackson County, Ohio =

Township in Ohio, US

- Township
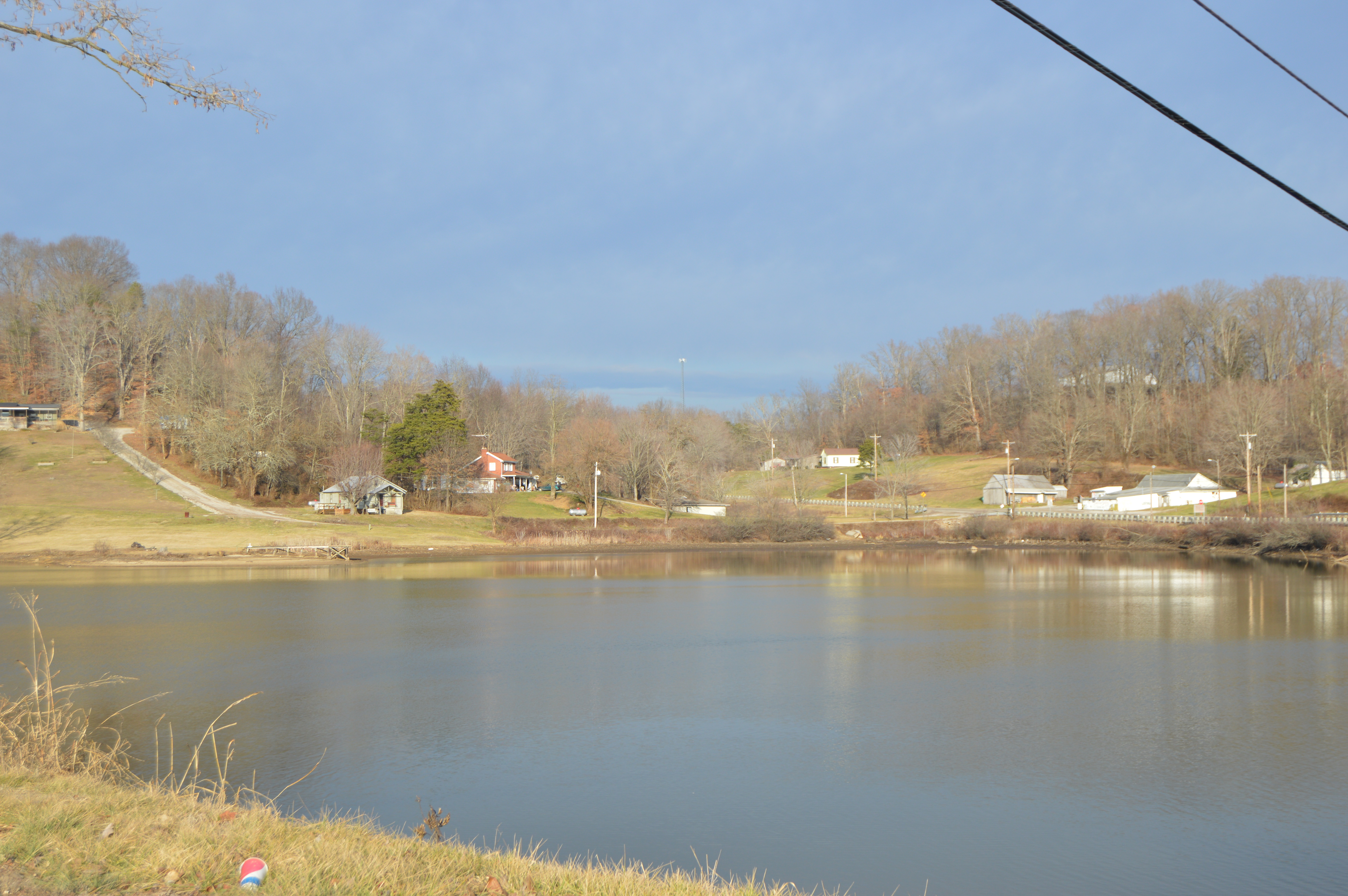
- Jackson Lake

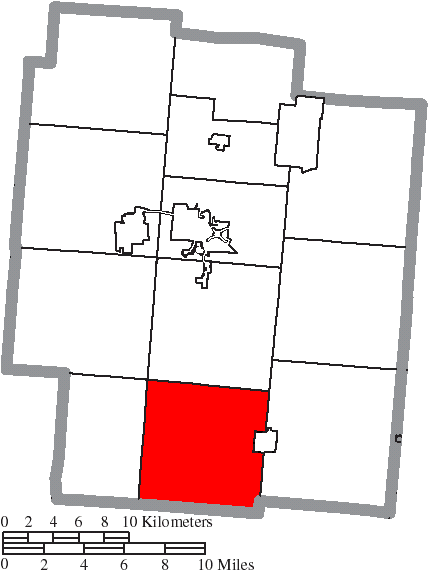
- Location of Jefferson Township in Jackson County
- Coordinates: 38°53′14″N 82°36′3″W
- Country: United States
- State: Ohio
- County: Jackson

Area
  - Total: 36.9 sq mi (95.6 km^{2})
  - Land: 36.6 sq mi (94.7 km^{2})
  - Water: 0.35 sq mi (0.9 km^{2})
- Elevation: 837 ft (255 m)

Population (2020)
  - Total: 3,509
  - Density: 96.0/sq mi (37.1/km^{2})
- Time zone: UTC-5 (Eastern (EST))
  - Summer (DST): UTC-4 (EDT)
- FIPS code: 39-38654
- GNIS feature ID: 1086368

Jefferson Township is one of the twelve townships of Jackson County, Ohio, United States. As of the 2020 census, 3,509 people lived in the township.

== Geography ==
Located in the southern part of the county, it borders the following townships:

- Franklin Township: north
- Madison Township: east
- Greenfield Township, Gallia County: southeast
- Washington Township, Lawrence County: south
- Bloom Township, Scioto County: southwest
- Hamilton Township: west
- Scioto Township: northwest corner

Part of the village of Oak Hill is located in eastern Jefferson Township.

== Name and history ==
Jefferson Township was organized around 1818, and named for Thomas Jefferson, the third President of the United States. It is one of twenty-four Jefferson Townships statewide.

Jefferson Township has the twelfth largest population of people of Welsh descent in the United States, and sixth largest in Ohio.

== Government ==
The township is governed by a three-member board of trustees, who are elected in November of odd-numbered years to a four-year term beginning on the following January 1. Two are elected in the year after the presidential election and one is elected in the year before it. There is also an elected township fiscal officer, who serves a four-year term beginning on April 1 of the year after the election, which is held in November of the year before the presidential election. Vacancies in the fiscal officership or on the board of trustees are filled by the remaining trustees.
