= Jefferson Furnace =

Coordinates: 38°53′36″N 82°35′56″W

The Jefferson Furnace in the United States started operation in 1854 and stopped production in 1916.

Although the current state of the furnace is one of disrepair, it is still considered a vital historic site for the Jackson County area. Located in Oak Hill, Ohio, it was founded by a group of Welshmen led by Thomas. T. Jones and John D. Davis. Management was paid a rate of $500 to $600 a year while the workers were paid $0.80 to $1.25 an hour ($1670-2610/yr, for the current federal standard of 2087 hours in a full-time work year).

During the American Civil War, much of the iron it produced was used to make the famous Union warship the Monitor, as well as the seven-ton guns at Harper's Ferry.

The last use of the Jefferson Furnace was at 11:40 p.m. on December 26, 1916, when the final cast was poured.

Tourists can view what now remains of the Jefferson Furnace at its original location on the edge of Lake Jackson in Oak Hill, Ohio. While very few steps are currently being taken to uphold the furnace, it has a marker proclaiming its historical significance to the village and the nation. While it faces an uncertain future due to its callus neglect, the furnace still stands more or less as it has for many years, now ravaged by weeds causing, along with age, the top layers of bricks to come apart.
