= Jackson Township, Jackson County, Ohio =

Township in Ohio, US

- Township
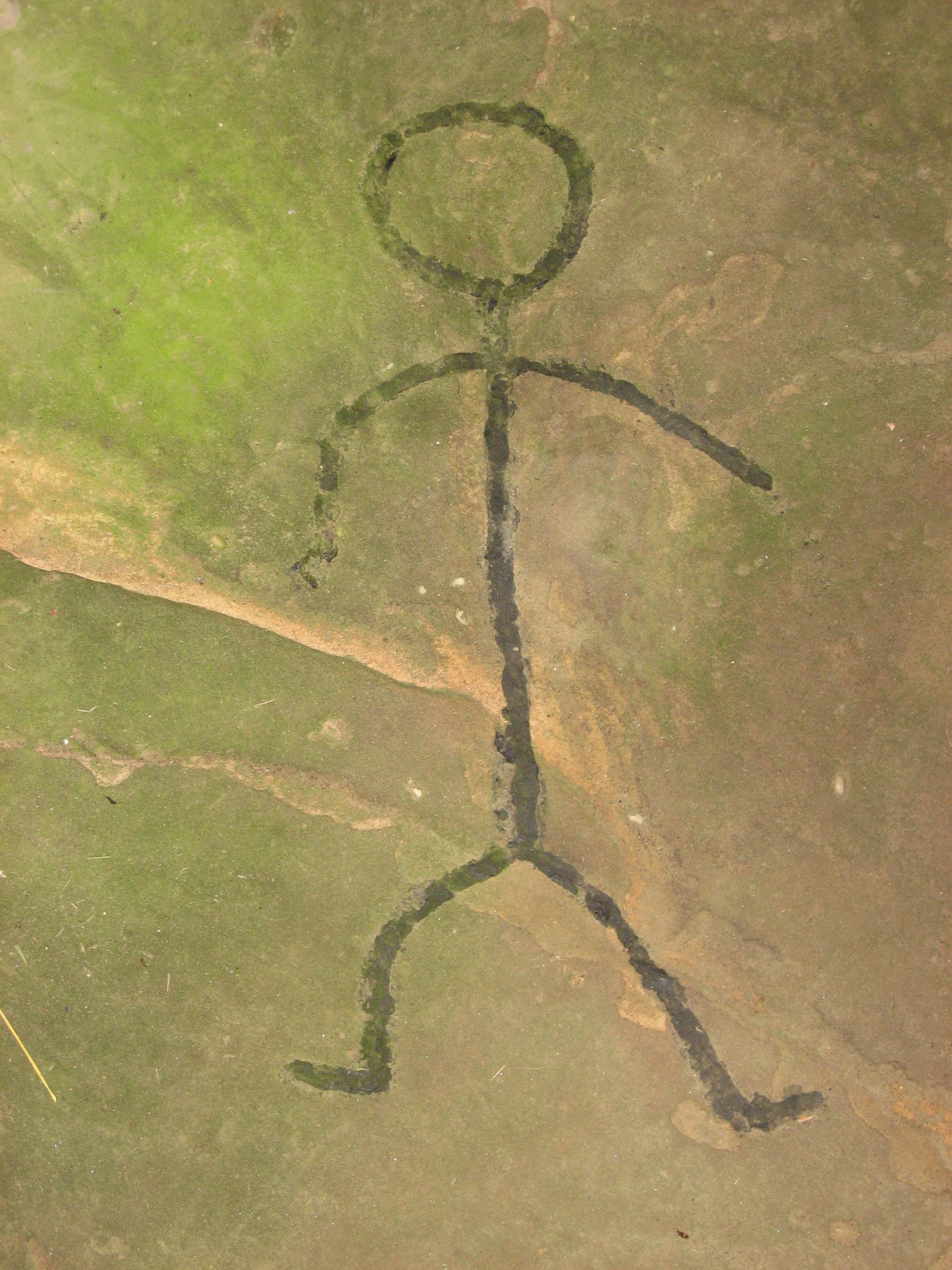
- One of the carvings at the prehistoric Leo Petroglyph

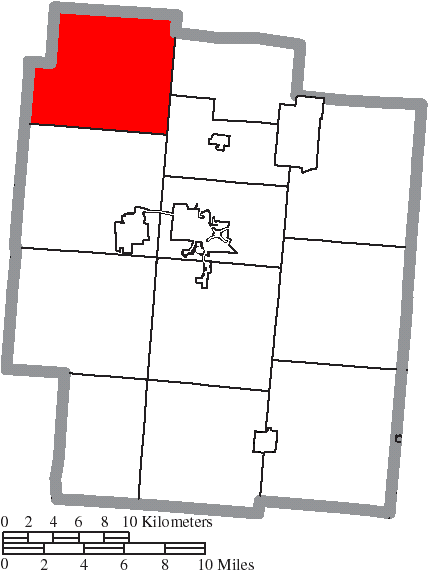
- Location of Jackson Township in Jackson County
- Coordinates: 39°9′21″N 82°43′18″W
- Country: United States
- State: Ohio
- County: Jackson

Area
  - Total: 38.8 sq mi (100.4 km^{2})
  - Land: 38.8 sq mi (100.4 km^{2})
  - Water: 0 sq mi (0.0 km^{2})
- Elevation: 846 ft (258 m)

Population (2020)
  - Total: 1,214
  - Density: 31.32/sq mi (12.09/km^{2})
- Time zone: UTC-5 (Eastern (EST))
  - Summer (DST): UTC-4 (EDT)
- ZIP code: 45640
- Area code: 740
- FIPS code: 39-37856
- GNIS feature ID: 1086367

Jackson Township is one of the twelve townships of Jackson County, Ohio, United States. As of the 2020 census, 1,214 people lived in the township.

== Geography ==
Located in the northwestern corner of the county, it borders the following townships:

- Harrison Township, Vinton County: north
- Richland Township, Vinton County: northeast
- Washington Township: east
- Coal Township: southeast
- Liberty Township: south
- Jackson Township, Pike County: west
- Jefferson Township, Ross County: northwest

No municipalities are located in Jackson Township.

== Name and history ==
Jackson Township was organized in 1816. This township took its name from Jackson County, which was named for Andrew Jackson, a major general in the War of 1812 and afterward seventh President of the United States (1829–1837). It is one of thirty-seven Jackson Townships statewide.

== Government ==
The township is governed by a three-member board of trustees, who are elected in November of odd-numbered years to a four-year term beginning on the following January 1. Two are elected in the year after the presidential election and one is elected in the year before it. There is also an elected township fiscal officer, who serves a four-year term beginning on April 1 of the year after the election, which is held in November of the year before the presidential election. Vacancies in the fiscal officership or on the board of trustees are filled by the remaining trustees.
