= Hamilton Township, Jackson County, Ohio =

Township in Ohio, US

- Township
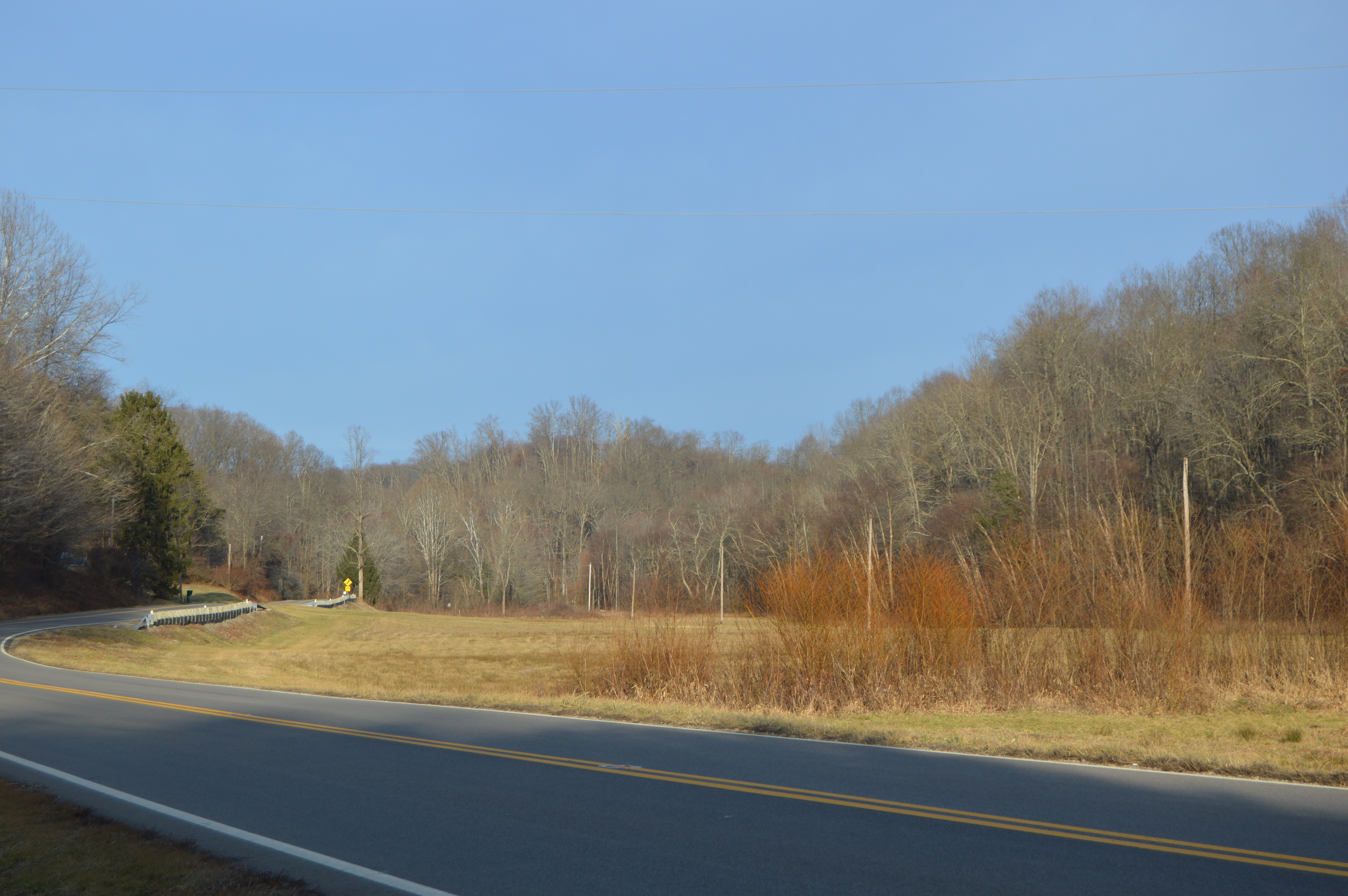
- Along State Route 139 in the township's northeast

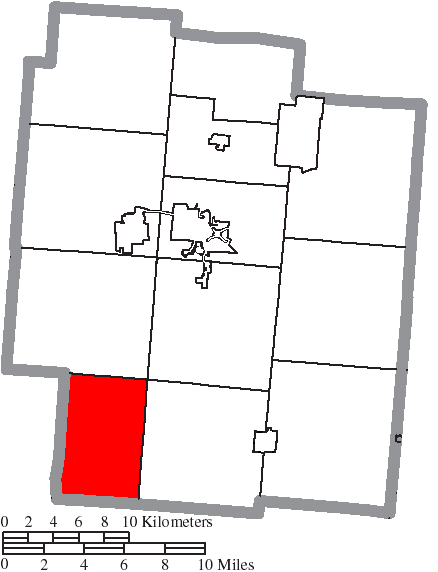
- Location of Hamilton Township in Jackson County
- Coordinates: 38°54′9″N 82°42′52″W
- Country: United States
- State: Ohio
- County: Jackson

Area
  - Total: 25.5 sq mi (66.1 km^{2})
  - Land: 25.5 sq mi (66.1 km^{2})
  - Water: 0 sq mi (0.0 km^{2})
- Elevation: 696 ft (212 m)

Population (2020)
  - Total: 545
  - Density: 21.4/sq mi (8.25/km^{2})
- Time zone: UTC-5 (Eastern (EST))
  - Summer (DST): UTC-4 (EDT)
- FIPS code: 39-33040
- GNIS feature ID: 1086366

Hamilton Township is one of the twelve townships of Jackson County, Ohio, United States. At the 2020 census, 545 people lived in the township.

== Geography ==
Located in the southwestern corner of the county, it borders the following townships:

- Scioto Township: north
- Franklin Township: northeast corner
- Jefferson Township: east
- Bloom Township, Scioto County: south
- Madison Township, Scioto County: west

No municipalities are located in Hamilton Township.

== Name and history ==
Hamilton Township was organized in 1816, and named after Alexander Hamilton.

== Government ==
The township is governed by a three-member board of trustees who are elected in November of odd-numbered years to a four-year term beginning on the following January 1. Two are elected in the year after the presidential election and one is elected in the year before it. There is also an elected township fiscal officer, who serves a four-year term beginning on April 1 of the year after the election, which is held in November of the year before the presidential election. Vacancies in the fiscal officership or on the board of trustees are filled by the remaining trustees.
