= Madison Township, Jackson County, Ohio =

Township in Ohio, US

- Township
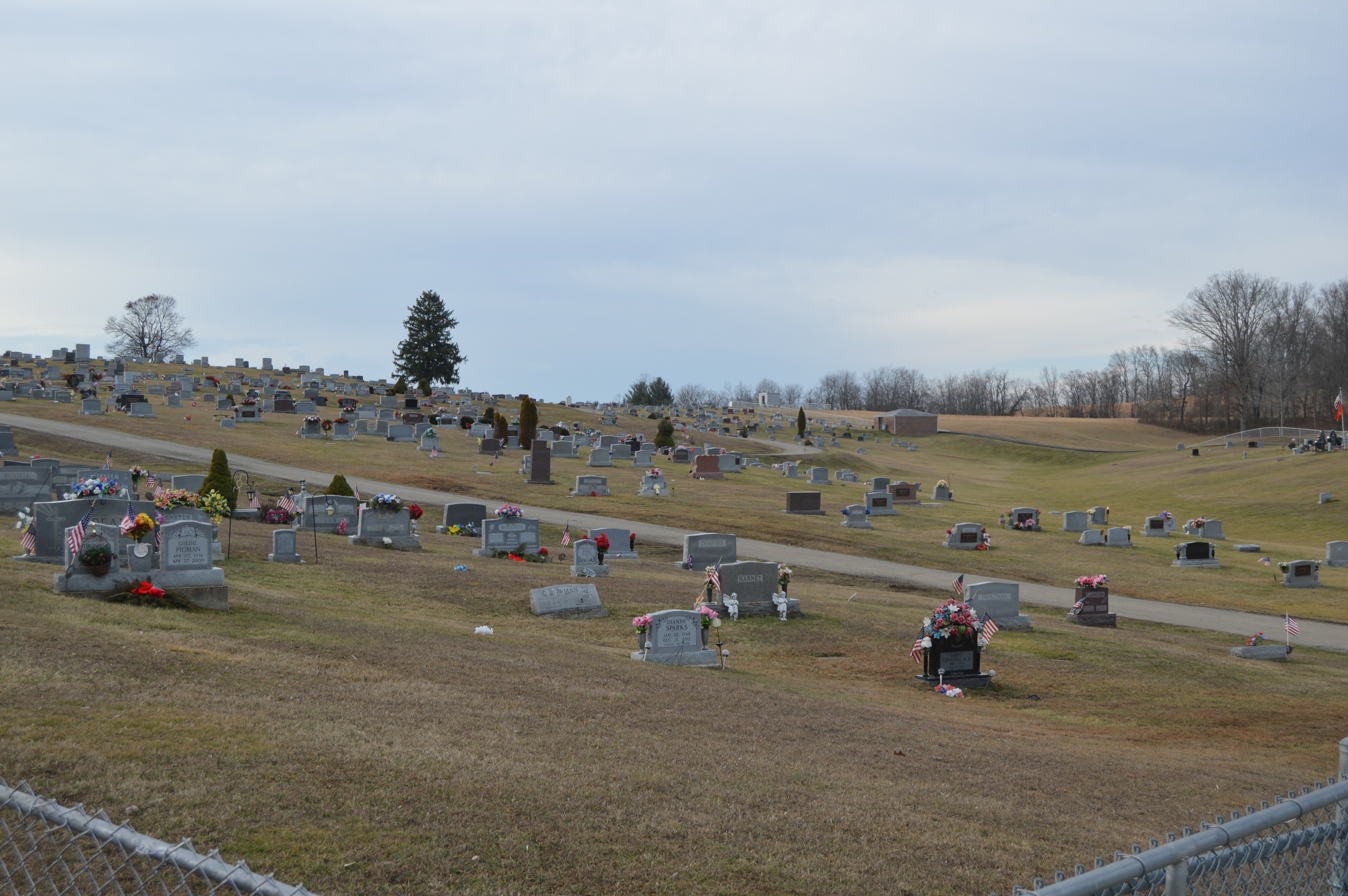
- Oak Hill Cemetery, east of the village

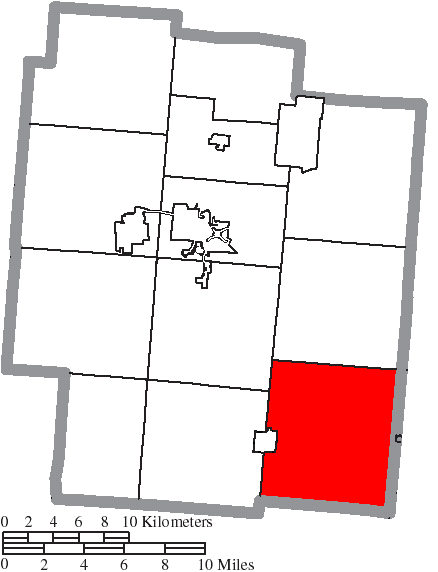
- Location of Madison Township in Jackson County
- Coordinates: 38°53′59″N 82°31′52″W
- Country: United States
- State: Ohio
- County: Jackson

Area
  - Total: 45.4 sq mi (117.6 km^{2})
  - Land: 45.3 sq mi (117.3 km^{2})
  - Water: 0.12 sq mi (0.3 km^{2})
- Elevation: 794 ft (242 m)

Population (2020)
  - Total: 2,090
  - Density: 46.1/sq mi (17.8/km^{2})
- Time zone: UTC-5 (Eastern (EST))
  - Summer (DST): UTC-4 (EDT)
- FIPS code: 39-46466
- GNIS feature ID: 1086371

Madison Township is one of the twelve townships of Jackson County, Ohio, United States. As of the 2020 census, 2,090 people lived in the township.

== Geography ==
Located in the southeastern corner of the county, it borders the following townships:

- Bloomfield Township: north
- Huntington Township, Gallia County: northeast corner
- Raccoon Township, Gallia County: east
- Perry Township, Gallia County: southeast
- Greenfield Township, Gallia County: south
- Jefferson Township: west
- Franklin Township: northwest

Part of the village of Oak Hill is located in western Madison Township.

== Name and history ==
Madison was organized as one of the original townships of Jackson Township, and was named for James Madison. It is one of twenty Madison Townships statewide.

== Government ==
The township is governed by a three-member board of trustees, who are elected in November of odd-numbered years to a four-year term beginning on the following January 1. Two are elected in the year after the presidential election and one is elected in the year before it. There is also an elected township fiscal officer, who serves a four-year term beginning on April 1 of the year after the election, which is held in November of the year before the presidential election. Vacancies in the fiscal officership or on the board of trustees are filled by the remaining trustees.
