= Washington Township, Jackson County, Ohio =

Township in Ohio, US

- Township
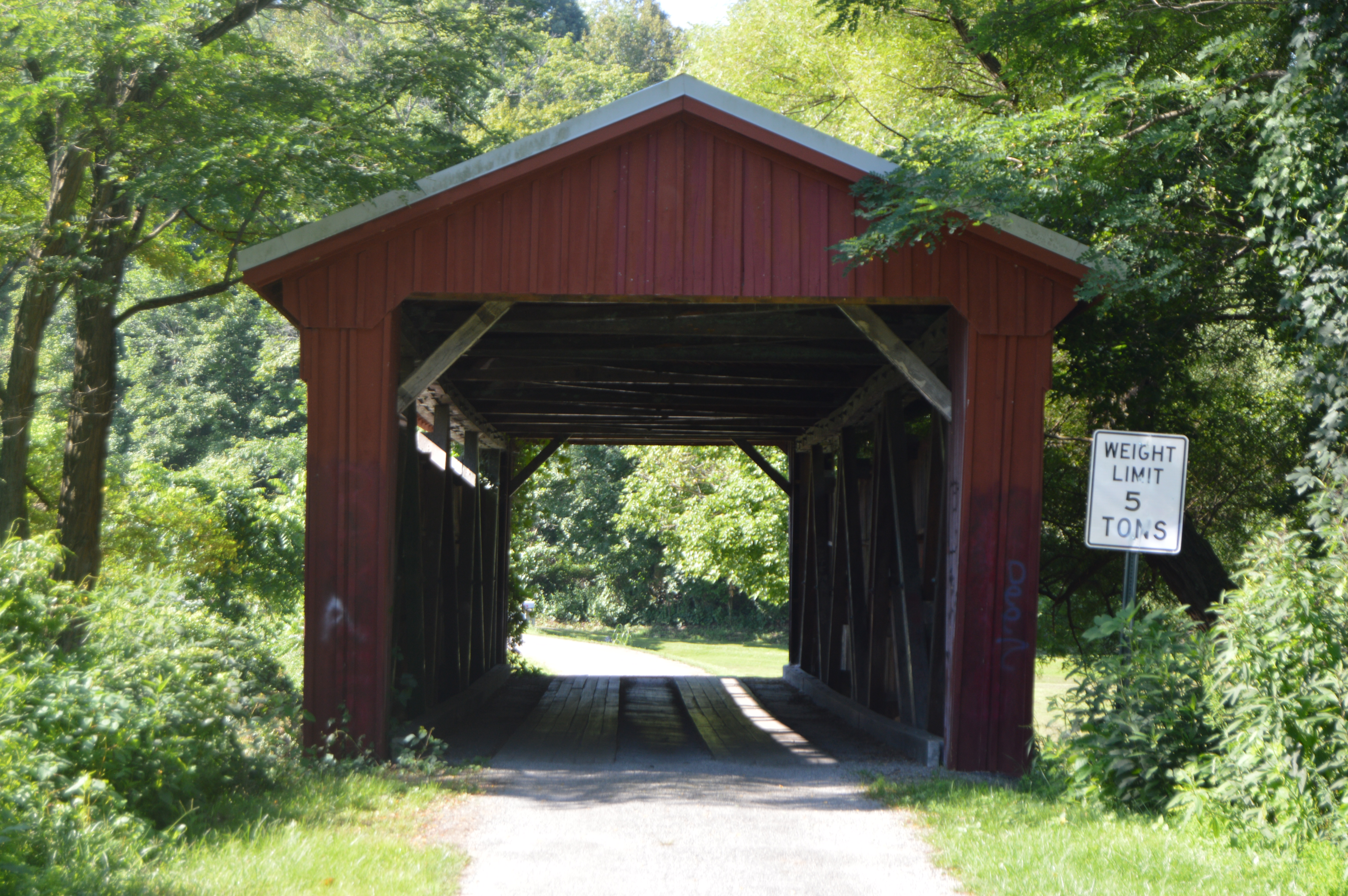
- Byer Covered Bridge

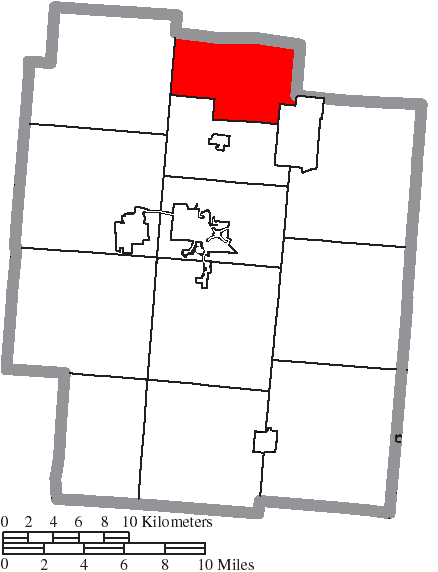
- Location of Washington Township in Jackson County
- Coordinates: 39°9′58″N 82°35′51″W
- Country: United States
- State: Ohio
- County: Jackson

Area
  - Total: 22.4 sq mi (57.9 km^{2})
  - Land: 22.4 sq mi (57.9 km^{2})
  - Water: 0 sq mi (0.0 km^{2})
- Elevation: 876 ft (267 m)

Population (2020)
  - Total: 796
  - Density: 35.6/sq mi (13.7/km^{2})
- Time zone: UTC-5 (Eastern (EST))
  - Summer (DST): UTC-4 (EDT)
- FIPS code: 39-81382
- GNIS feature ID: 1086374

Washington Township is one of the twelve townships of Jackson County, Ohio, United States. As of the 2020 census, 796 people lived in the township.

== Geography ==
Located in the northern part of the county, it borders the following townships:

- Richland Township, Vinton County: north
- Clinton Township, Vinton County: east
- Milton Township: southeast
- Coal Township: south
- Jackson Township: west

A small part of the city of Wellston lies in far southeastern Washington Township, and the unincorporated community of Byer is located in the township's northwest.

== Name and history ==
Washington Township was established around 1818, and named for George Washington, first President of the United States. It is one of forty-three Washington Townships statewide.

== Government ==
The township is governed by a three-member board of trustees, who are elected in November of odd-numbered years to a four-year term beginning on the following January 1. Two are elected in the year after the presidential election and one is elected in the year before it. There is also an elected township fiscal officer, who serves a four-year term beginning on April 1 of the year after the election, which is held in November of the year before the presidential election. Vacancies in the fiscal officership or on the board of trustees are filled by the remaining trustees.
