= Franklin Township, Jackson County, Ohio =

Township in Ohio, US

- Township
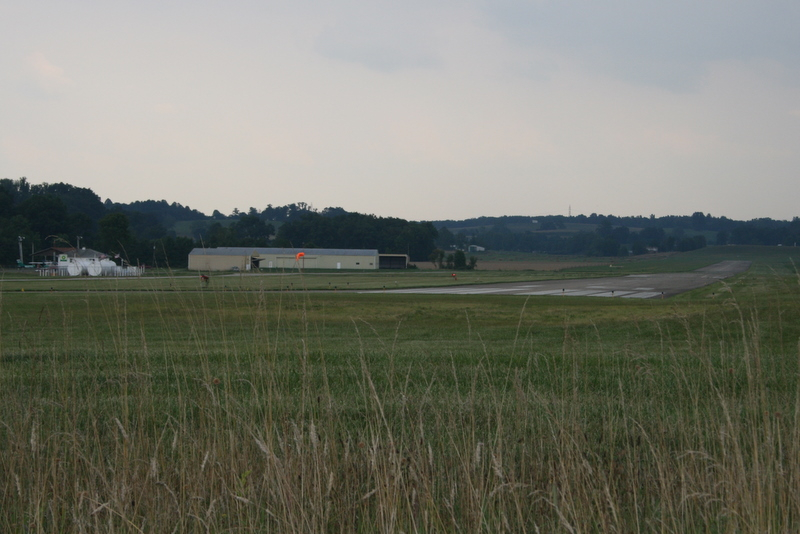
- Jackson County Airport

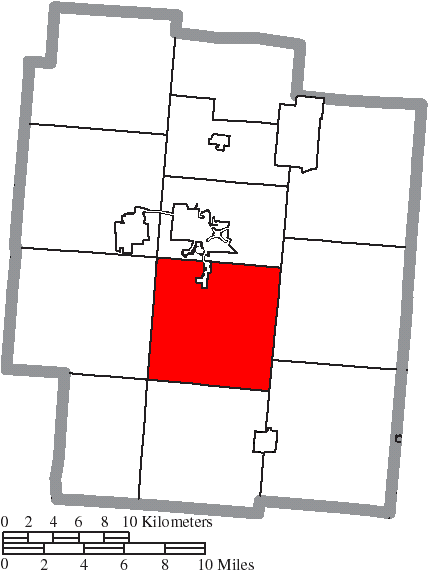
- Location of Franklin Township in Jackson County
- Coordinates: 38°58′27″N 82°36′21″W
- Country: United States
- State: Ohio
- County: Jackson

Area
  - Total: 36.9 sq mi (95.5 km^{2})
  - Land: 36.8 sq mi (95.4 km^{2})
  - Water: 0.039 sq mi (0.1 km^{2})
- Elevation: 751 ft (229 m)

Population (2020)
  - Total: 2,290
  - Density: 62.2/sq mi (24.0/km^{2})
- Time zone: UTC-5 (Eastern (EST))
  - Summer (DST): UTC-4 (EDT)
- FIPS code: 39-28322
- GNIS feature ID: 1086365

Historical population
Census	Pop.	Note	%±
2000	1,913		—
2010	2,129		11.3%
2020	2,290		7.6%
U.S. Census:

Franklin Township is one of the twelve townships of Jackson County, Ohio, United States. As of the 2020 census, 2,290 people lived in the township.

== Geography ==
Located in the southern part of the county, it borders the following townships:

- Lick Township: north
- Bloomfield Township: east
- Madison Township: southeast
- Jefferson Township: south
- Hamilton Township: southwest corner
- Scioto Township: west
- Liberty Township: northwest corner

Of the three Jackson County townships that do not border other counties (Franklin, Lick, and Coal), Franklin Township is the farthest south.

A small part of the city of Jackson, the county seat of Jackson County, lies in northern Franklin Township.

== Name and history ==
Franklin Township was organized as an original township of Jackson County, and named for Benjamin Franklin. It is one of twenty-one Franklin Townships statewide.

== Government ==
The township is governed by a three-member board of trustees, who are elected in November of odd-numbered years to a four-year term beginning on the following January 1. Two are elected in the year after the presidential election and one is elected in the year before it. There is also an elected township fiscal officer, who serves a four-year term beginning on April 1 of the year after the election, which is held in November of the year before the presidential election. Vacancies in the fiscal officership or on the board of trustees are filled by the remaining trustees.
