= Bloomfield Township, Jackson County, Ohio =

Township in Ohio, US

- Township
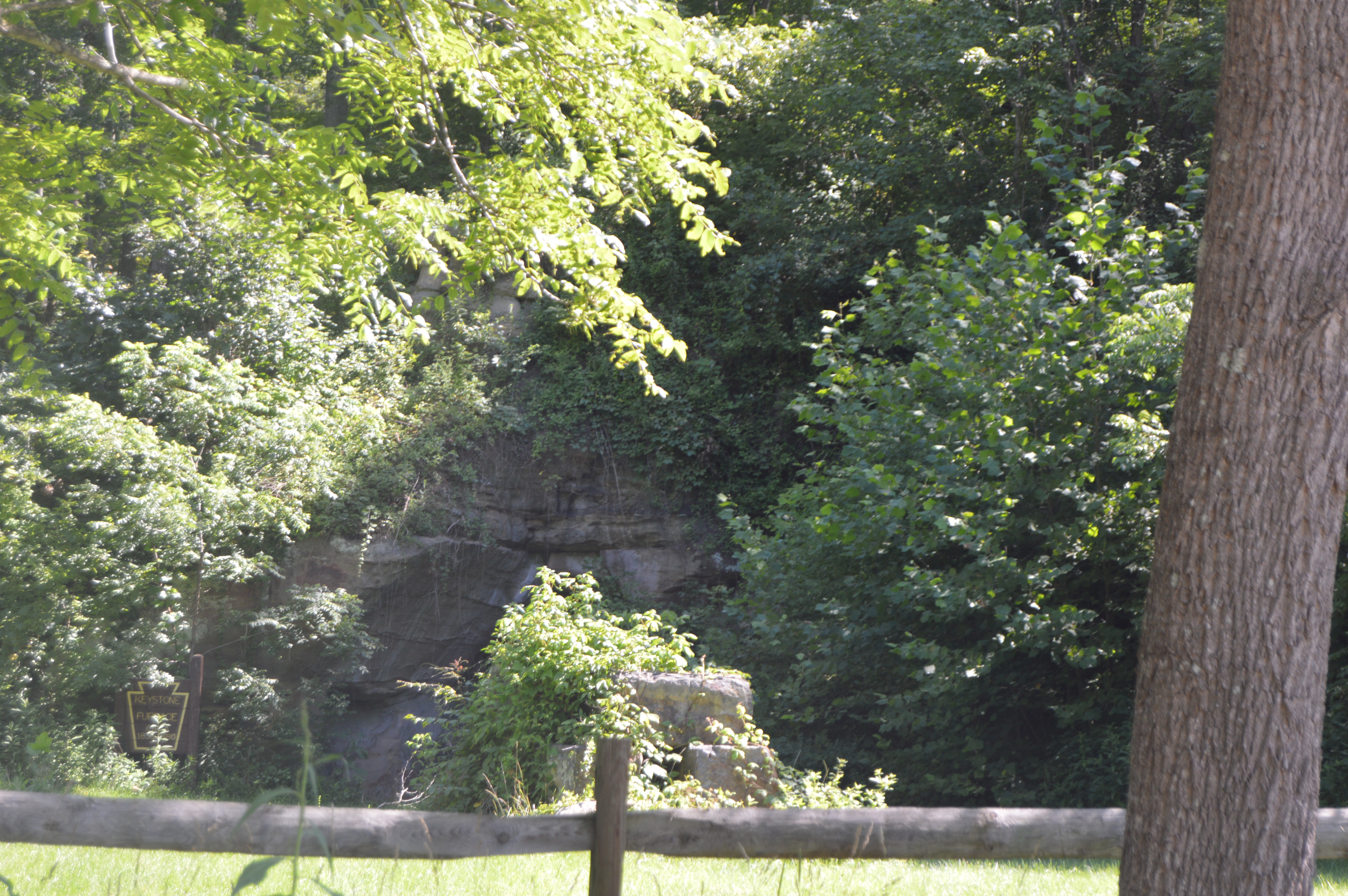
- Keystone Furnace, built 1849

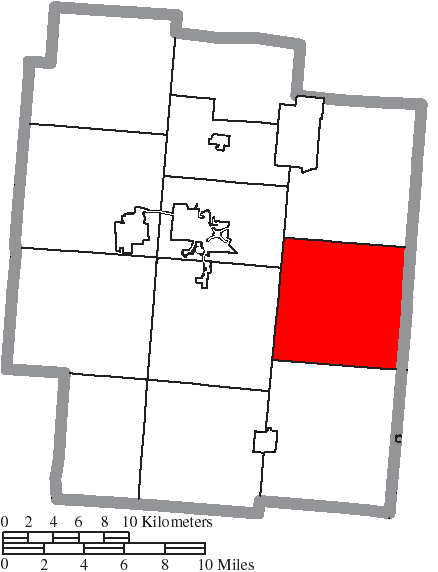
- Location of Bloomfield Township in Jackson County
- Coordinates: 38°59′1″N 82°30′38″W
- Country: United States
- State: Ohio
- County: Jackson

Area
  - Total: 38.8 sq mi (100.4 km^{2})
  - Land: 38.7 sq mi (100.3 km^{2})
  - Water: 0.039 sq mi (0.1 km^{2})
- Elevation: 791 ft (241 m)

Population (2020)
  - Total: 1,155
  - Density: 29.82/sq mi (11.52/km^{2})
- Time zone: UTC-5 (Eastern (EST))
  - Summer (DST): UTC-4 (EDT)
- FIPS code: 39-07090
- GNIS feature ID: 1086363

Bloomfield Township is one of the twelve townships of Jackson County, Ohio, United States. As of the 2020 census, 1,155 people lived in the township.

== Geography ==
Located in the eastern part of the county, it borders the following townships:

- Milton Township: north
- Wilkesville Township, Vinton County: northeast corner
- Huntington Township, Gallia County: east
- Raccoon Township, Gallia County: southeast corner
- Madison Township: south
- Franklin Township: west
- Lick Township: northwest

No municipalities are located in Bloomfield Township.

== Name and history ==
Statewide, other Bloomfield Townships are located in Logan and Trumbull counties.

== Government ==
The township is governed by a three-member board of trustees, who are elected in November of odd-numbered years to a four-year term beginning on the following January 1. Two are elected in the year after the presidential election and one is elected in the year before it. There is also an elected township fiscal officer, who serves a four-year term beginning on April 1 of the year after the election, which is held in November of the year before the presidential election. Vacancies in the fiscal officership or on the board of trustees are filled by the remaining trustees.
