= Coalton, Ohio =

- Village
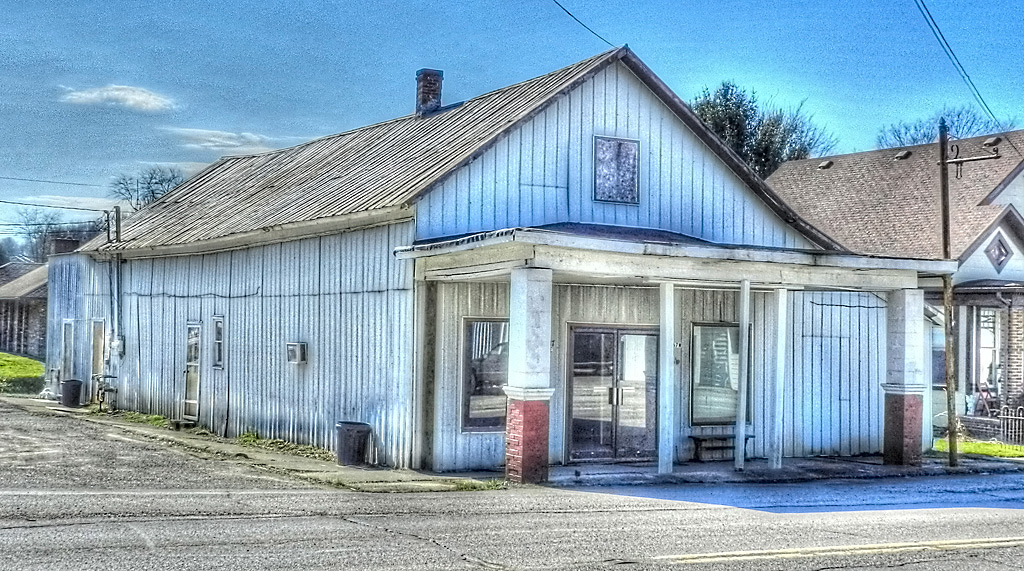
- Historic Miners' Supply Store

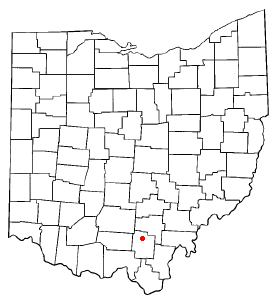
- Location of Coalton, Ohio

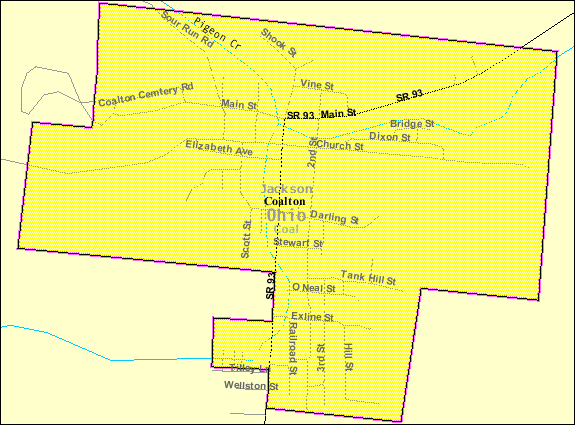
- Detailed map of Coalton
- Coordinates: 39°06′42″N 82°36′39″W
- Country: United States
- State: Ohio
- County: Jackson

Area
  - Total: 0.56 sq mi (1.44 km^{2})
  - Land: 0.56 sq mi (1.44 km^{2})
  - Water: 0 sq mi (0.00 km^{2})
- Elevation: 705 ft (215 m)

Population (2020)
  - Total: 445
  - Estimate (2024): 444
  - Density: 801.8/sq mi (309.57/km^{2})
- Time zone: UTC-5 (Eastern (EST))
  - Summer (DST): UTC-4 (EDT)
- ZIP code: 45621
- Area code: 740
- FIPS code: 39-16434
- GNIS feature ID: 2398589
- Website: https://villageofcoalton.org/

Coalton is a village in Jackson County, Ohio, United States. The population was 445 at the 2020 census.

The village derives its name from Coal Township.

== Geography ==
According to the United States Census Bureau, the village has a total area of 0.55 square miles (1.42 km^{2}), all land.

The neighborhood of Englishville lies inside Coalton. Coalton is connected to Ohio State Route 93.

== Demographics ==
Historical population
| Census | Pop. | Note | %± |
|---|---|---|---|
| 1890 | 1,459 | | — |
| 1900 | 1,625 | | 11.4% |
| 1910 | 1,111 | | −31.6% |
| 1920 | 790 | | −28.9% |
| 1930 | 646 | | −18.2% |
| 1940 | 623 | | −3.6% |
| 1950 | 628 | | 0.8% |
| 1960 | 648 | | 3.2% |
| 1970 | 550 | | −15.1% |
| 1980 | 639 | | 16.2% |
| 1990 | 553 | | −13.5% |
| 2000 | 545 | | −1.4% |
| 2010 | 479 | | −12.1% |
| 2020 | 445 | | −7.1% |
| 2024 (est.) | 444 | | −0.2% |

=== 2010 census ===
As of the census of 2010, there were 479 people, 205 households, and 128 families living in the village. The population density was 870.9 inhabitants per square mile (336.3/km^{2}). There were 241 housing units at an average density of 438.2 per square mile (169.2/km^{2}). The racial makeup of the village was 97.5% White, 0.2% African American, 0.4% Native American, and 1.9% from two or more races. Hispanic or Latino of any race were 0.8% of the population.

There were 205 households, of which 30.7% had children under the age of 18 living with them, 38.0% were married couples living together, 16.6% had a female householder with no husband present, 7.8% had a male householder with no wife present, and 37.6% were non-families. 33.2% of all households were made up of individuals, and 13.6% had someone living alone who was 65 years of age or older. The average household size was 2.34 and the average family size was 2.89.

The median age in the village was 40.4 years. 21.7% of residents were under the age of 18; 8.2% were between the ages of 18 and 24; 26.2% were from 25 to 44; 29.2% were from 45 to 64; and 14.8% were 65 years of age or older. The gender makeup of the village was 49.5% male and 50.5% female.

=== 2000 census ===
As of the census of 2000, there were 545 people, 210 households, and 149 families living in the village. The population density was 991.9 inhabitants per square mile (383.0/km^{2}). There were 243 housing units at an average density of 442.3 per square mile (170.8/km^{2}). The racial makeup of the village was 97.25% White, 0.92% African American, 0.55% Asian, and 1.28% from two or more races. Hispanic or Latino of any race were 0.92% of the population.

There were 210 households, out of which 32.9% had children under the age of 18 living with them, 51.9% were married couples living together, 15.2% had a female householder with no husband present, and 29.0% were non-families. 26.7% of all households were made up of individuals, and 10.0% had someone living alone who was 65 years of age or older. The average household size was 2.60 and the average family size was 3.09.

In the village, the population was spread out, with 26.4% under the age of 18, 10.5% from 18 to 24, 29.2% from 25 to 44, 25.5% from 45 to 64, and 8.4% who were 65 years of age or older. The median age was 33 years. For every 100 females, there were 93.3 males. For every 100 females age 18 and over, there were 95.6 males.

The median income for a household in the village was $24,167, and the median income for a family was $28,333. Males had a median income of $28,269 versus $15,682 for females. The per capita income for the village was $11,080. About 29.0% of families and 27.5% of the population were below the poverty line, including 34.5% of those under age 18 and 51.1% of those age 65 or over.

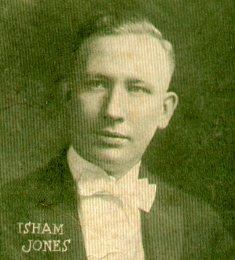
Isham Jones, 1922

== Notable people ==
- Pat Duncan, MLB player
- Isham Jones, musician and songwriter
- Jim Rhodes, Governor of Ohio 1963–1971, 1975–1983
