= National Register of Historic Places listings in Jackson County, Ohio =

Location of Jackson County in Ohio

This is a list of the National Register of Historic Places listings in Jackson County, Ohio.

This is intended to be a complete list of the properties and districts on the National Register of Historic Places in Jackson County, Ohio, United States. The locations of National Register properties and districts for which the latitude and longitude coordinates are included below, may be seen in an online map.

There are 14 properties and districts listed on the National Register in the county.

This National Park Service list is complete through NPS recent listings posted March 14, 2025.

== Current listings ==
	Name on the Register	Image	Date listed	Location	City or town	Description
1	Battle of Berlin Heights Engagement Site		July 5, 2018 (#100002645)	Eastern half of the northwestern quarter and western half of the northeastern quarter of Section 19, Township 7 North, Range 17 West; 39°04′52″N 82°32′17″W	Milton Township	Site of a Civil War battle, July 17, 1863.
2	Buckeye Furnace	Buckeye Furnace	November 10, 1970 (#70000503)	Buckeye Furnace Road; 39°03′23″N 82°27′26″W	Buckeye	
3	Buckeye Furnace Covered Bridge	Buckeye Furnace Covered Bridge	February 24, 1975 (#75001442)	3 miles southeast of Wellston; 39°03′16″N 82°27′31″W	Buckeye	
4	Byer Covered Bridge	Byer Covered Bridge	October 21, 1975 (#75001441)	Byers-Winters Road; 39°10′46″N 82°37′53″W	Byer	
5	Clutts House	Clutts House	November 26, 1980 (#80003105)	16 E. Broadway St. 39°07′25″N 82°32′04″W	Wellston	
6	Gibson House	Gibson House	December 5, 1985 (#85003045)	187 Main St. 39°03′10″N 82°38′19″W	Jackson	
7	Johnson Road Covered Bridge	Johnson Road Covered Bridge	August 23, 1984 (#84003749)	Johnson Rd., SW of Petersburg; 38°57′31″N 82°47′16″W	Petersburg	
8	Keystone Furnace	Keystone Furnace	March 18, 1982 (#82003600)	Keystone Rd. 39°00′39″N 82°27′06″W	Keystone	
9	Leo Petroglyph	Leo Petroglyph	November 10, 1970 (#70000501)	West of Leo; 39°08′59″N 82°40′33″W	Leo	
10	Miner's Supply Store	Miner's Supply Store	November 1, 1977 (#77001069)	Main and 2nd Sts. 39°06′48″N 82°36′38″W	Coalton	
11	Morgan Mansion	Morgan Mansion	February 16, 1979 (#79001867)	Broadway and Pennsylvania Aves. 39°07′25″N 82°31′59″W	Wellston	
12	Oak Hill Welsh Congregational Church	Oak Hill Welsh Congregational Church	May 23, 1978 (#78002090)	412 E. Main St. 38°53′44″N 82°34′09″W	Oak Hill	
13	Scioto Grange No. 1234	Scioto Grange No. 1234	February 9, 2005 (#05000030)	255 Cove Rd. 39°00′49″N 82°44′52″W	Jackson	
14	Harvey Wells House	Harvey Wells House	April 14, 2009 (#09000211)	403 E. A St. 39°07′27″N 82°31′49″W	Wellston	

== See also ==
- List of National Historic Landmarks in Ohio
- Listings in neighboring counties: Gallia, Lawrence, Pike, Ross, Scioto, Vinton
- National Register of Historic Places listings in Ohio
