= Buckeye =

Buckeye may refer to:

== Relating to the US state of Ohio ==
- Buckeye (nickname), a nickname for residents of the U.S. state of Ohio, the "buckeye state"
  - Ohio State Buckeyes, the intercollegiate athletic teams of the Ohio State University
  - Brutus Buckeye, the mascot of the Ohio State University
  - Aesculus glabra, also known as the Ohio buckeye, Ohio's state tree
- Cleveland Buckeyes, a Negro league baseball franchise, 1942–1950
- Buckeyes, the athletic teams of Nelsonville-York High School, Nelsonville, Ohio

== Arts and media ==
- "Buckeye", a song by Lamb of God on the 1999 album Burn the Priest
- Buckeye (novel), a 2025 novel by Patrick Ryan
- Nathan "Buckeye" Heywood or Citizen Steel, a DC Comics character

== Businesses ==
- Buckeye Broadband, a cable company
- Buckeye Industries, an American aircraft manufacturer
- Buckeye Partners, a petroleum distributor based in Texas, US
- Buckeye Steel Castings, a former steelmaker in Columbus, Ohio

== Places ==
- Buckeye, Arizona
- Buckeye, California (disambiguation)
- Buckeye, Colorado
- Buckeye, Indiana
- Buckeye, Iowa
- Buckeye, Kansas
- Buckeye, Kentucky
- Buckeye, Missouri
- Buckeye Township (disambiguation)
- Buckeye, Washington
- Buckeye, West Virginia
- Buckeye, Ohio, which also houses the "Buckeye Furnace" and the Buckeye Furnace Covered Bridge
- Buckeye Lake, Ohio
- Buckeye Trail, a long-distance trail in Ohio
- Buckeye–Shaker, a neighborhood of Cleveland, Ohio

== Science and technology ==
=== Biology ===
- Buckeye (tree), several tree species of the genus Aesculus
- Buckeye chicken, a breed of chicken originating in Ohio
- Buckeye rot of tomato
- Junonia coenia, also called buckeye, a butterfly in the family Nymphalidae found in the United States and Canada

=== Other uses in science and technology ===
- Buckeye coupler, a railway car coupler
- North American T-2 Buckeye, an aircraft
- Buckeye system, operational airborne surveying system

== Other uses ==
- Buckeye candy, a peanut butter and chocolate candy resembling the nut of a buckeye tree
- Buckeye Division, or 37th Infantry Division, of the US Army
- Garland Buckeye (1897–1975), former professional football and baseball player
- USS Buckeye (AN-13/YN-8), Aloe-class net laying ship in service with the United States Navy from 1942 to 1947
- Buckeye, any of three named passenger trains in the United States

== See also ==
- Bukeye, in the country of Burundi
