= Geospatial Research Laboratory =

Component of the U.S. Engineer Research and Development Center

Coordinates: 38°44′48″N 77°08′43″W

Engineer Research and Development Center
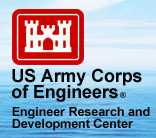
- Established: October 1999
- Research type: Research in support of the Army Corps of Engineers mission
- Director: Gary W. Blohm
- Location: 7701 Telegraph Road, Alexandria, Virginia, 22315-3864, U.S.A.
- Website: www.erdc.usace.army.mil/Locations/GRL.aspx

The Geospatial Research Laboratory (GRL) is a component of the Engineer Research and Development Center (ERDC), a US Army Corps of Engineers (USACE) laboratory organization whose mission is to "Provide science, technology, and expertise in engineering and environmental sciences in support of our Armed Forces and the Nation to make the world safer and better." The laboratory is colocated with the Army Geospatial Center in the Humphreys Engineer Center adjacent to Fort Belvoir. The headquarters is located in Vicksburg, Mississippi, on the site of an antecedent organization, the Waterways Experiment Station. GRL conducts geospatial research, development, technology and evaluation of current and emerging geospatial technologies that will help characterize and measure phenomena within the physical (terrain) and social (cultural) environments encountered by the Army.

GRL research areas and capabilities include terrain analysis and reasoning; passive and active spectral signature analysis; fluorescence; photogrammetry; terrain visualization; precision surveying and mapping; image analysis; data management; geographic information systems; data/image fusion; and spatio-temporal reasoning and numerical analysis.

== History ==
In October 1999, the Corps of Engineers established a system of laboratories, called the Engineer Research and Development Center (ERDC). The ERDC was a consolidation of seven, pre-existing laboratories, the Coastal and Hydraulics, Environmental, Geotechnical and Structures, and Information Technology Laboratories in Vicksburg, Mississippi; the Construction Engineering Research Laboratory in Champaign, Illinois; the Cold Regions Research and Engineering Laboratory in Hanover, New Hampshire; and the Topographic Engineering Center in Alexandria, Virginia, which became the Army Geospatial Center (AGC) and started reporting directly to the Corps of Engineers as of 2009. As of 2014, ERDC still maintained a Geospatial Research Laboratory (GRL) collocated in Alexandria with AGC. ERDC won the Army Research Laboratory of the Year award five times in its first eight years.

== List of other ERDC laboratories ==
- Coastal and Hydraulics Laboratory, Vicksburg, Mississippi
- Cold Regions Research and Engineering Laboratory, Hanover, New Hampshire
- Construction Engineering Research Laboratory, Champaign, Illinois
- Environmental Laboratory, Vicksburg, Mississippi
- Geotechnical and Structures Laboratory, Vicksburg, Mississippi
- Information Technology Laboratory, Vicksburg, Mississippi
