= Buckeye system =

The Buckeye system (also called BuckEye) is an operational airborne surveying system that provides high-resolution spatial imagery over an area of interest to support military operations involved with intelligence, surveillance, and reconnaissance. Once mounted on a helicopter or an unmanned aerial vehicle (UAV), it incorporates visual information from a digital camera and elevation data from a Light Detection and Ranging (LIDAR) system to create a two and three-dimensional colored map with orthorectified, 4 to 6-inch resolution.

Buckeye has been used by deployed personnel from the Topographic Engineering Center to support operations in both Afghanistan and Iraq, including Operation Iraqi Freedom. In 2007, it was named by the Army as one of the top ten inventions of 2006.

== History ==
In 2004, the U.S. Army Engineer Research and Development Center (ERDC) in Vicksburg, Mississippi developed the Buckeye system in an effort to provide more accurate geospatial information during asymmetric warfare. At the time, Buckeye provided a higher resolution imagery than Controlled Image Base 1 (CIB1), which was the military standard in terms of resolution range for digital imagery. Initially, Buckeye was designed to provide imagery for change detection applications for detection of improvised explosive devices (IEDs). However, the time delay that occurred every time the geospatial information was delivered to the ground-station caused Buckeye to be more effectively used as a tool for digitally mapping urban areas than finding IEDs.

The Buckeye system has been implemented by U.S. forces since November 2004, and the maps of urban terrain collected by the sensors have been used by U.S. military personnel since 2007. By 2016, Buckeye had collected more than 85,000 square kilometers (about 32,819 square miles) of geospatial imagery data in Iraq and more than 200,000 square kilometers (77,220 square miles) of data in Afghanistan, most of which was used to provide rapid tactical response in urban terrain.

== Operation ==
The Buckeye system relies on two major components: the electro-optical (EO) imaging system and the LIDAR system. The EO system utilizes a CCD camera and an embedded imaging computer to obtain the desired images while accounting for the movement of the aerial system to which it is attached. The digital camera is able to operate at exposures as short as 1/4000 sec, eliminating motion blur for images acquired at typical ground velocities of 110 knots. To gather elevation data, Buckeye uses an Optech ALTM 3100 (Airborne Laser Terrain Mapper) LIDAR sensor system, which emits a laser pulse and records the time it takes for the energy to hit the target and return to the receiver. The time of the trip, combined with information regarding the angle of the sensor and the altitude, allows Buckeye to generate a 3D coordinate at the target. The combined efforts of both sensor systems transforms the collected images into a compressed, georeferenced, and colored mosaic, which can then be used to create a 3D map of the area.

== Upgrades ==
Several organizations have contributed to further developments and upgrades. To add another level of visual information, ERDC has worked to combine the EO and LIDAR sensors in Buckeye with infrared (IR) sensors. To prevent the compression computer from overheating and shutting down when operating under direct sunlight and high temperatures, researchers made physical modifications to the 30-pound aerial system that often carried the sensors in the air to direct airflow to the hardware components and programmed the system to drop the CPU load to 66% if the internal temperature exceeded a critical level.

The Army Research Laboratory (ARL) in Adelphi, Maryland integrated aspects of the Constant Hawk surveillance system into Buckeye during the Iraq War to refine its three-dimensional capability. However, this upgrade was not implemented until after the war ended in Iraq. Researchers at ARL have also developed a 3D-viewer for Buckeye and other LIDAR systems as part of the Persistent Surveillance-Intelligence, Surveillance and Reconnaissance (PS-ISR) concept demonstration, a project to prepare the U.S. Army for future warfare. ARL has used Buckeye data to develop Tactical Digital Hologram technology, a variant of 3D holographic technology that compares 3D holographic static images against conventional topographic data for intelligence, reconnaissance, and training purposes.
