= Buckeye Township, Kansas =

Buckeye Township, Kansas may refer to:

- Buckeye Township, Dickinson County, Kansas
- Buckeye Township, Ellis County, Kansas
- Buckeye Township, Ottawa County, Kansas

== See also ==
- List of Kansas townships
- Buckeye Township (disambiguation)
