= Buckeye, California =

Buckeye, California may refer to:

- Buckeye, which is the former name of Carbondale, California
- Buckeye, El Dorado County, California
- Buckeye, Plumas County, California
- Buckeye, Shasta County, California
- Buckeye, Yolo County, California
- Buckeye, Yuba County, California
