= Information Technology Laboratory =

Information Technology Laboratory may refer to:

- Information Technology Laboratory, National Institute of Standards and Technology (NIST)
- Information Technology Laboratory, US Army Corps of Engineers' Engineer Research and Development Center (ERDC)
