= Clutts House =

Historic house in Ohio, United States

- U.S. National Register of Historic Places
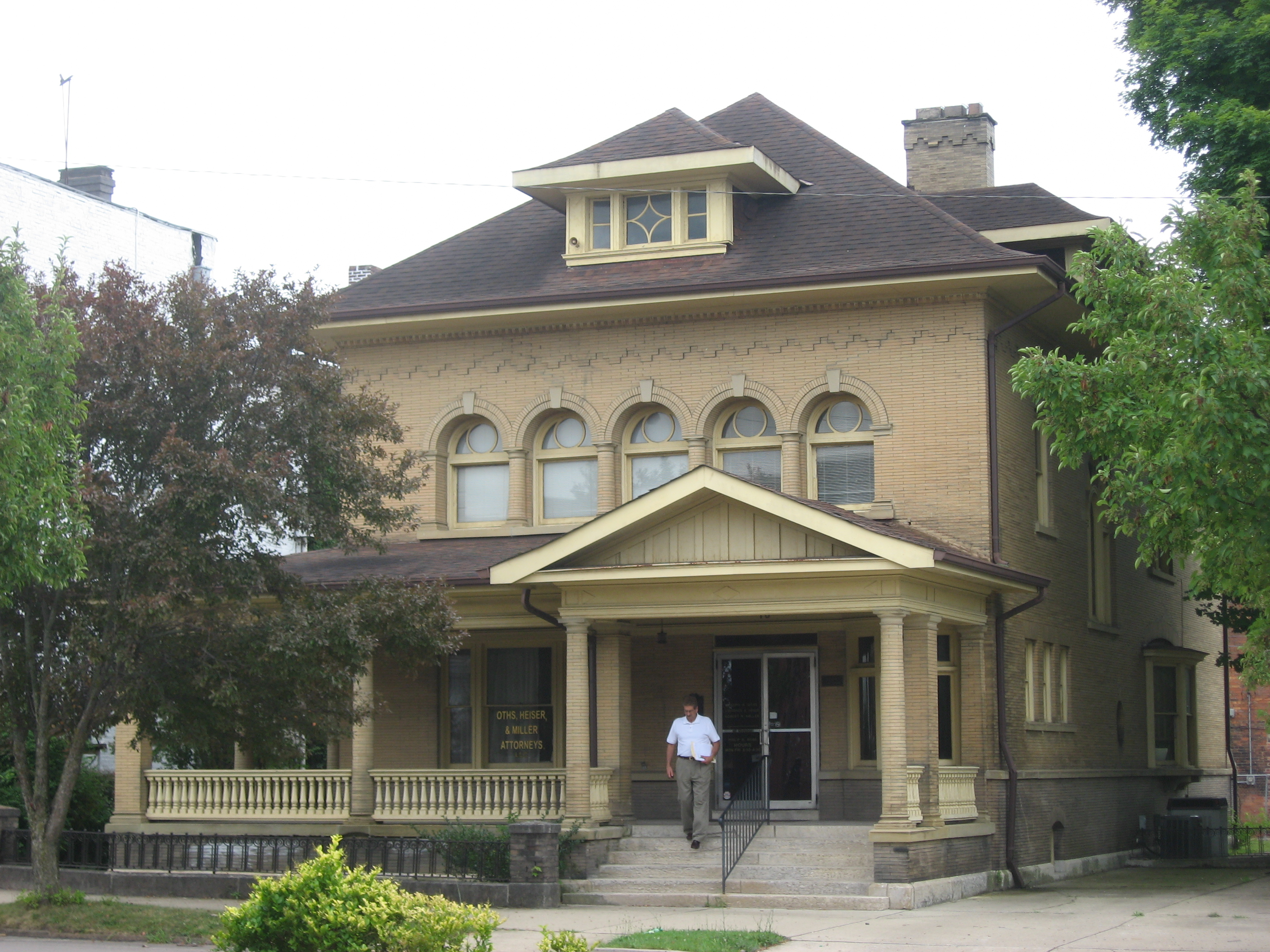
- Front of the house

- Location within Ohio Location within the United States
- Location: 16 E. Broadway St., Wellston, Ohio
- Coordinates: 39°7′25″N 82°32′4″W
- Area: less than one acre
- Built: 1902
- NRHP reference No.: 80003105
- Added to NRHP: November 26, 1980

The Clutts House is a historic residence in the city of Wellston in Jackson County, Ohio, United States. Built in 1902, it was constructed as the home of Joseph Clutts, a leading member of Wellston society and industry.

Born in 1861, Joseph Clutts moved to Wellston in 1882. Within a short period of time, he embarked on a path to make himself one of the region's most significant citizens: he purchased the nearby Wellston and Milton blast furnaces, bought a share in the ownership of the Spring Valley Iron Company, and acquired wide areas of woodland to provide fuel for his furnaces. In 1896, with Henry Adam Marting and Lewis Vogelsong, he organized the Wellston Iron and Steel Company, which operated two more blast furnaces. Along with a partner named Willard, Clutts bought out his former partners in 1898.

Clutts arranged for the construction of the present house in 1902. Measuring two-and-a-half stories tall, the resulting structure features buff-colored brick walls, which are topped by a roof of ceramic tiles. No single architectural style can be said to dominate the house, but its size and details make it one of the city's most architecturally prominent residences. Most houses in Wellston, whether contemporaneous with the Clutts House or constructed at other times, are significantly smaller buildings erected for common workers.

Following Clutts' death in 1927, his home became known as the "Reese Building." Since that time, it has ceased to be used for residential purposes; the present occupants are the law firm of Oths, Heiser, and Miller, which has converted it into their law offices. Little has changed inside or outside the house in the century since its construction: although it has ceased to be used as a residence, the home still features most of its original decorative details and structural elements. In 1980, the Clutts House was listed on the National Register of Historic Places, qualifying both because of its connection to Clutts himself and because of its well preserved and historically significant architecture. It is one of three buildings on the Register in the city of Wellston, along with the Morgan Mansion and the Harvey Wells House.
