= Buckeye Township =

Buckeye Township may refer to:

- Buckeye Township, Stephenson County, Illinois
- Buckeye Township, Hardin County, Iowa
- Buckeye Township, Dickinson County, Kansas
- Buckeye Township, Ellis County, Kansas
- Buckeye Township, Ottawa County, Kansas, in Ottawa County, Kansas
- Buckeye Township, Michigan
- Buckeye Township, Shannon County, Missouri
- Buckeye Township, Kidder County, North Dakota, in Kidder County, North Dakota
