= Cold Regions Research and Engineering Laboratory =

US Army Corps of Engineers facility in Hanover, New Hampshire

Coordinates: 43°43′26″N 72°16′23″W

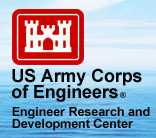

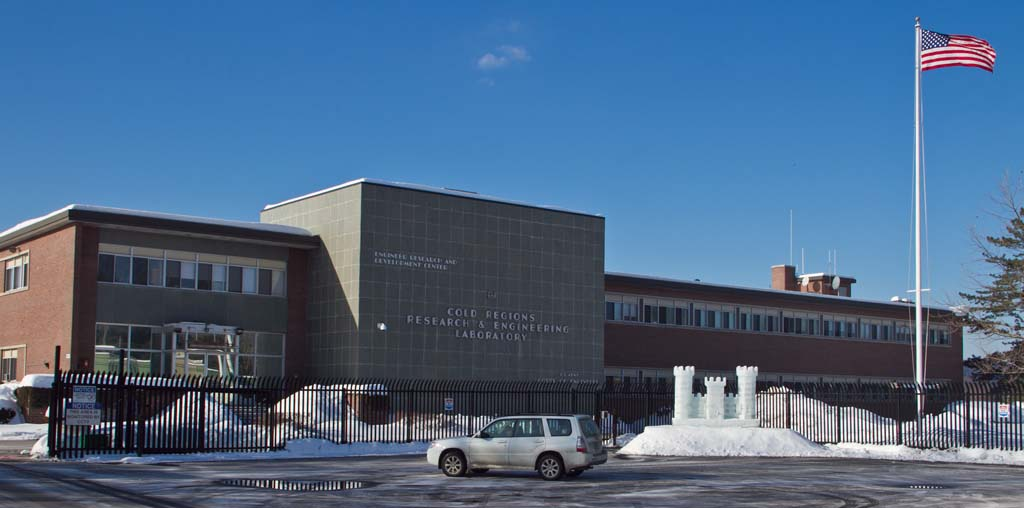
- Established: 1 February 1961
- Research type: Cold-regions science and engineering
- Director: Joseph L. Corriveau
- Location: 72 Lyme Road, Hanover, New Hampshire, 03755-1290, U.S.A.
- Website: www.erdc.usace.army.mil/Locations/CRREL/

The Cold Regions Research and Engineering Laboratory (CRREL) is a United States Army Corps of Engineers, Engineer Research and Development Center research facility headquartered in Hanover, New Hampshire, that provides scientific and engineering support to the U.S. government and its military with a core emphasis on cold environments. CRREL also provides technical support to non-government customers.

CRREL arose from a consolidation of three antecedent organizations whose purpose was to understand frozen ground, permafrost, snow, and ice as factors which were important in strategic northern areas during the Cold War. In its first 25 years CRREL researchers contributed to the understanding of polar ice caps, permafrost, and the engineering technology for developing natural resources in cold climates, such as Alaska. CRREL researchers have also made contributions to science in climate change, the understanding of wave propagation for sensor systems, the control of snow on structures and ice in navigable waterways, and the environmental remediation of military installations.

== Mission areas ==
The stated mission of CRREL is to "solve interdisciplinary, strategically important problems of the US Army Corps of Engineers, Army, DOD, and the Nation by advancing and applying science and engineering to complex environments, materials, and processes in all seasons and climates, with unique core competencies related to the Earth's cold regions."

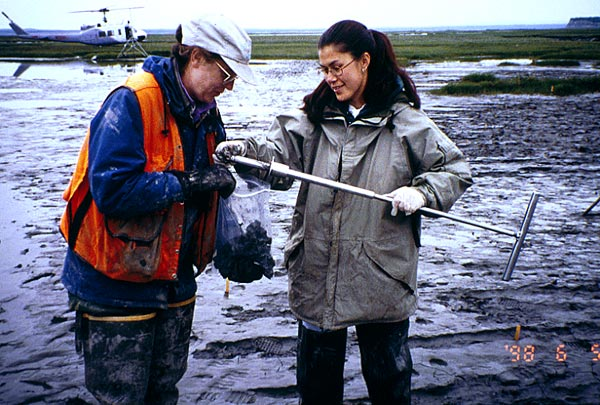
Sampling mud sediments for contaminants that were causing waterfowl deaths at Eagle River Flats, near Anchorage, Alaska.

The technical areas that CRREL staff reportedly engage in are:

- Biogeochemical processes in soils – Encompasses the management and remediation of military training lands and characterizing how microorganisms survive in soils subject to freezing.
- Infrastructure in cold regions – Addresses building envelopes, pavement technology, geotechnical engineering, the design and repair of aircraft runways, and polar facilities.
- The fate and transport of chemicals in the environment – Addresses the detection and the modeling of distribution and movement of chemical contaminants in soils, especially in extreme terrains. It includes topics relating to permafrost degradation.
- Hydrology and hydraulics – Encompasses the processes related to ice in rivers, locks and dams and their effects on ships. Supporting this effort is the CRREL Ice Jam Database. It also addresses snow hydrology by characterizing the distribution and runoff rates of snow, using various investigative techniques.

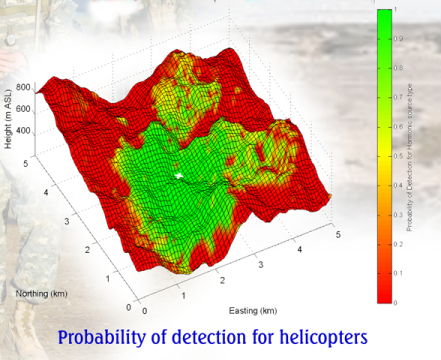
Simulation of terrain, depicting the probability of detecting helicopters from the center of the grid.

- Support of military maneuverability and air operations – Addresses the mobility of vehicles over terrain subject to snow, ice, freezing and thawing. It includes the operation of aircraft on minimal improved landing sites. Related work addresses operations in Antarctica, supporting over-ice transport and snow and ice runways.
- Propagation of signals to sensors and imaging systems – Encompasses the use of ground-penetrating radar, radar, seismic sensors, and acoustic sensors to develop methods to model the propagation of millimeter-wave, seismic and acoustical signals through various media. This research is applied to the detection of unexploded ordnance and military targets.
- Terrestrial and meteorological processes in cold regions – Addresses the state of natural and man-made terrain for modeling their physical characteristics. It encompasses the science of sea ice and glaciers to the micro-scale processes that represent the formation of snow and ice crystals. The scientific problems include global climate change and the influence of weather on aviation and transportation.
- Geospatial applications for tracking water resources – Emphasizes the use of remote sensing techniques and the use of mapping imagery to understand environmental and technical problems at a geographic scale.

== Facilities ==
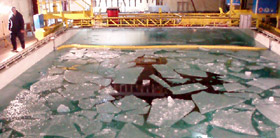
Evaluation of surfactants to control oil on ice-infested water within the refrigerated test basin of the Ice Engineering Facility.

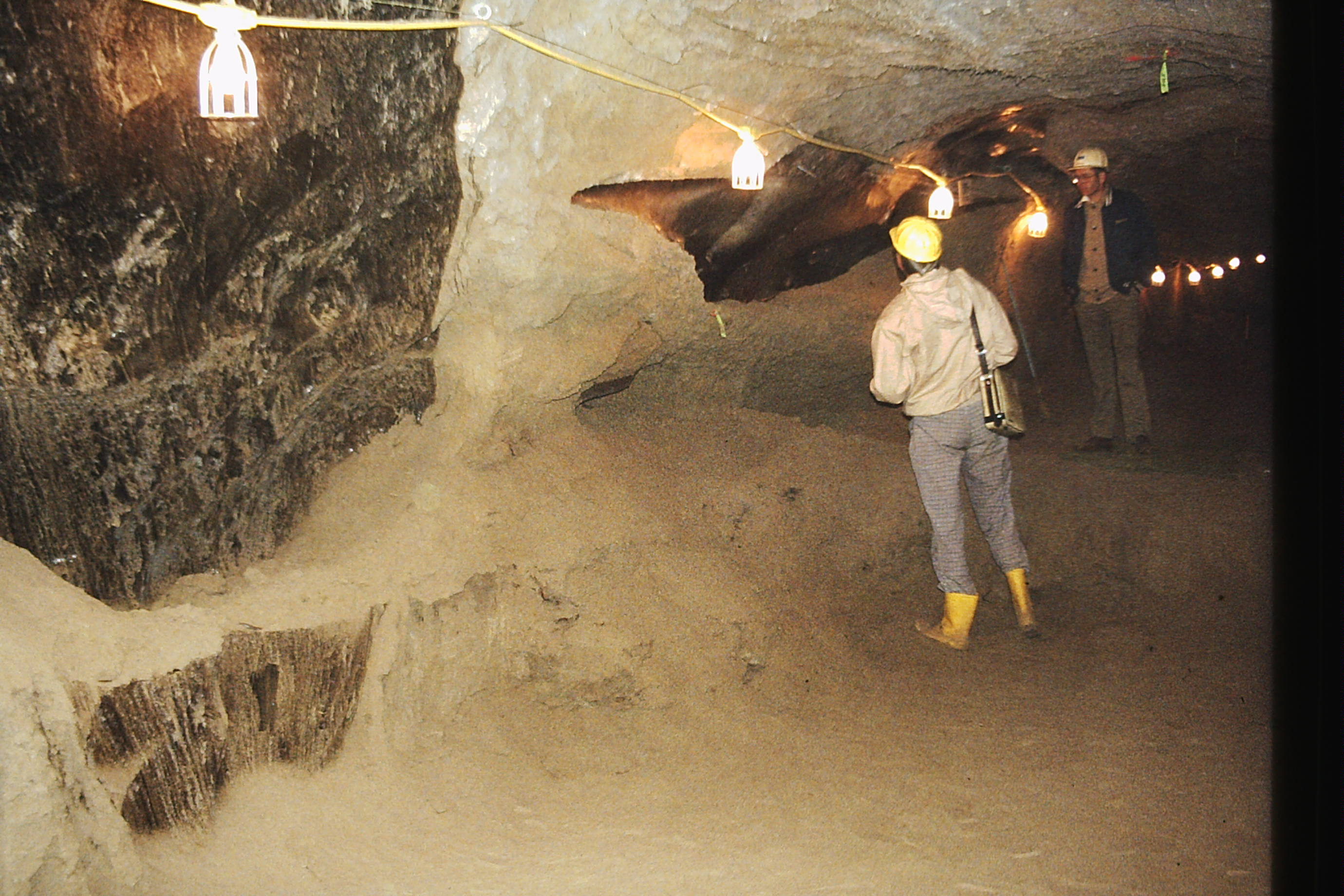
CRREL permafrost tunnel 1987

The main facility is located in Hanover, New Hampshire, north of Dartmouth College. The facilities include:

- Cold Rooms for experimentation on frozen materials
- A Frost Effects Research Facility (FERF), devoted to the study of large-scale soil systems, like pavements.
- An Ice Engineering Facility (IEF), which is devoted to the study of ice effects in navigable waterways, hydrology and hydraulics problems, flooding, and other matters that may result from ice formation.
- A Remote Sensing and Geographic Information System (RS/GIS) facility
- A permafrost tunnel near Fairbanks, Alaska.
- Facilities for testing coatings exposed to icing and salt environments in Fairbanks and Treat Island, Maine.

Other laboratories cover chemistry, biology, and civil engineering topics.

CRREL maintains an office at Fort Wainwright, near Fairbanks, Alaska, and an office at the Army Corps of Engineers Alaska District in Anchorage, Alaska.

== History ==
CRREL was formed on 1 February 1961 from a merger of the earlier Snow, Ice and Permafrost Research Establishment (SIPRE) with the Arctic Construction and Frost Effects Laboratory (ACFEL).

=== Antecedents and establishment ===
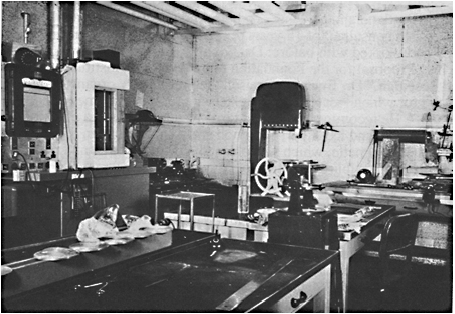
Cold room for studying snow and ice at SIPRE

CRREL's antecedents and establishment were chronicled in an official history. In 1944-53 the U.S. Army Corps of Engineers established three independent organizations that were the antecedents to CRREL. Within its New England Division, the Corps of Engineers founded the Frost Effects Laboratory to "coordinate research on the effects of frost on the design and construction of roads, airfields and structures in frost-affected areas," based in Boston, Massachusetts, in 1944. The Corps of Engineers' St. Paul (Minnesota) District established its Permafrost Division in 1944 to determine design methods and construction procedures for the construction of airfields on permafrost.

The Corps established SIPRE (the Snow, Ice and Permafrost Research Establishment) in 1949, which moved to Wilmette, Illinois, in 1951. Its purpose was to "conduct basic and applied research in snow, ice and frozen ground." In 1953, the Corps merged the Frost Effects Laboratory and Permafrost Division of the St. Paul District to establish ACFEL (the Arctic Construction and Frost Effects Laboratory) in Boston. In 1959, SIPRE researchers participated in the establishment of Camp Century in Greenland to study technical and scientific issues with a facility, based on the Greenland Ice Cap. Having built a new facility for the combined SIPRE and AFCEL organizations, the Corps established CRREL on 1 February 1961 in Hanover, New Hampshire.

=== 1961-1986 ===
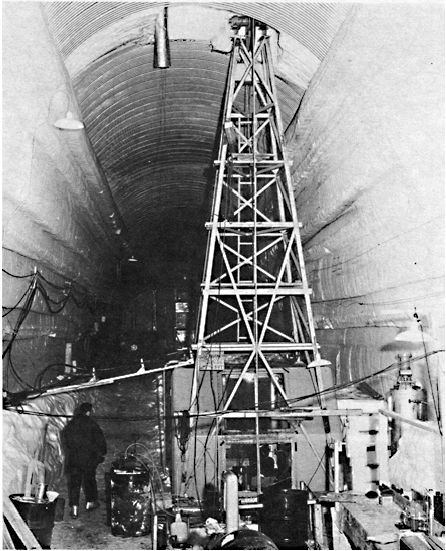
Thermal drill used to bore into the Greenland ice sheet at Camp Century

During its first quarter century, CRREL researchers and staff were active in the Arctic, Antarctica, Alaska and the Great Lakes, providing climatic history data, addressing resource extraction issues and extending winter navigation.

==== Drilling through ice caps ====
In 1966, CRREL researchers successfully drilled through the Greenland ice cap to a depth of 4,550 feet (1,390 m). The effort took three years, but provided a continuous ice core that represented more than 120,000 years. This extended the ability of scientists to interpret climatic history and became an early source of information about global climate change. In 1968, the same CRREL team was the first to penetrate the Antarctic ice cap, after drilling through over 7,100 feet (2,200 m) of ice, providing a climatic record at a second location on the globe.

==== Facilitating Alaska North Slope oil development ====
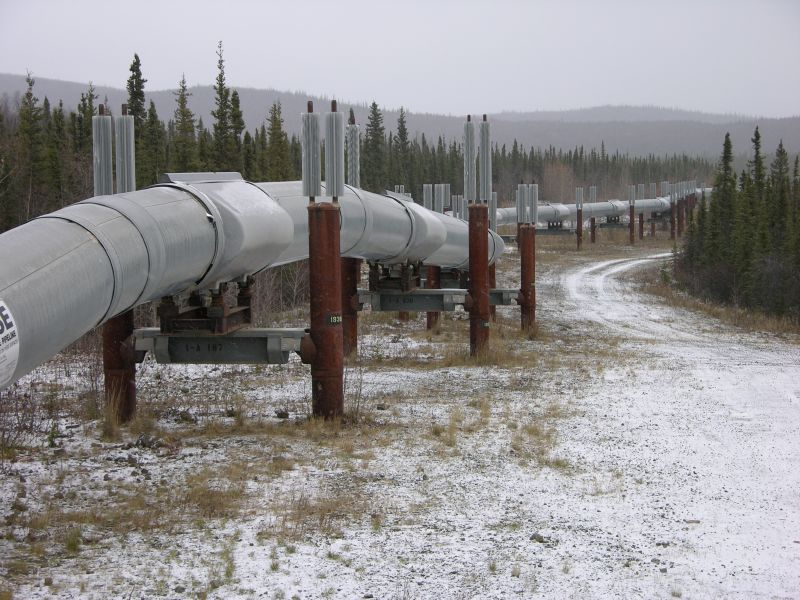
Trans-Alaska pipeline, supported by heat pipes traversing discontinuous permafrost in Alaska

The 1967 discovery of oil north of Alaska's Brooks Range raised two basic questions that CRREL was positioned to answer as a consultant to participating oil companies: how to extract oil from frozen terrain, permafrost, or from under the perennially frozen Beaufort Sea, and how best to transport the crude oil to the continental U.S. for refining and consumption.

CRREL staff members participated in the exploration of two transportation options, the use of an ice-breaking oil tanker, and the use of an over-land pipeline that would cross much of Alaska over regions of permafrost. As for the Beaufort Sea, CRREL researchers conducted studies of the properties and behavior of arctic sea ice, which would present a problem for off-shore drilling operations. CRREL researchers were active participants in both voyages of the icebreaking oil tanker SS Manhattan to assess the feasibility of the sea transport option. At the same time, CRREL engineers reviewed and advised the federal inspector of the Trans-Alaska Pipeline. During the construction of the pipeline, CRREL researchers studied the engineering implications of foundations and roadways over permafrost and ice.

==== Freshwater navigation ====
In the 1970s CRREL supported a Corps of Engineers initiative to extend navigation through the Great Lakes and St. Lawrence Seaway throughout the winter. They developed methods to address icing of locks and the clogging of waterways with floating ice that included booms, bubblers, and coatings of locks.

==== Cold War role ====
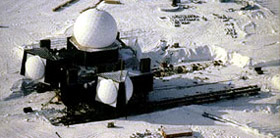
Move of DYE 2 radar facility to new foundations on the Greenland ice cap

CRREL played a role in assisting the U.S. Air Force to establish and maintain a system of Distant Early Warning (DEW) Line facilities during the Cold War era. In 1976, a CRREL researcher was instrumental in the moving of a 10-story-high, 3,300-ton DEW Line facility on the Greenland Ice Cap from a foundation that had been compromised by the movement of the ice on which it was built to a new foundation. In 1984, CRREL personnel completed their survey reports for 31 sites of the new North Warning System that replaced the DEW line.

A continuing scientific exchange between CRREL and Soviet cold regions research institutions began in 1972, these included the Arctic and Antarctic Research Institute in Leningrad and Permafrost Research Institute in Yakutsk.

=== 1986-present ===
CRREL's second 25 years saw the dissolution of the Soviet Union, the end of the Cold War and a shift in funding that reduced the emphasis of direct appropriations from Congress to a greater reliance on reimbursement for research from CRREL's customers, as evidenced by the sponsorship of its technical reports. Customers funding CRREL research included various components of the U.S. Army, Air Force and Navy. In addition, civilian agencies turned to CRREL for research answers, including the National Science Foundation, the Environmental Protection Agency, and NASA. In addition, a variety of private organizations funded CRREL research to solve problems that they faced. CRREL's list of technical reports lists 27 topical categories, covering science and engineering.

==== Military research ====
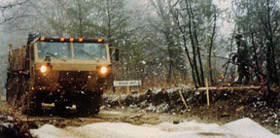
Army vehicle maneuvering in thawing conditions

CRREL continued to grow its capability to serve the U.S. military with programs in signal propagation that would facilitate the detection of enemy movements via infrared imaging, radar, acoustics or seismic sensors in any meteorological conditions. It served the environmental needs of the U.S. Army by facilitating the identification and clean-up of contaminants on training lands, due primarily to partially detonated explosives or unexploded ordnance (UXO). Other researchers addressed mobility issues with vehicles over snow and muddy terrain. CRREL researchers participated in defining tactical runway requirements for the C-17 military transport aircraft.

==== Civilian research ====
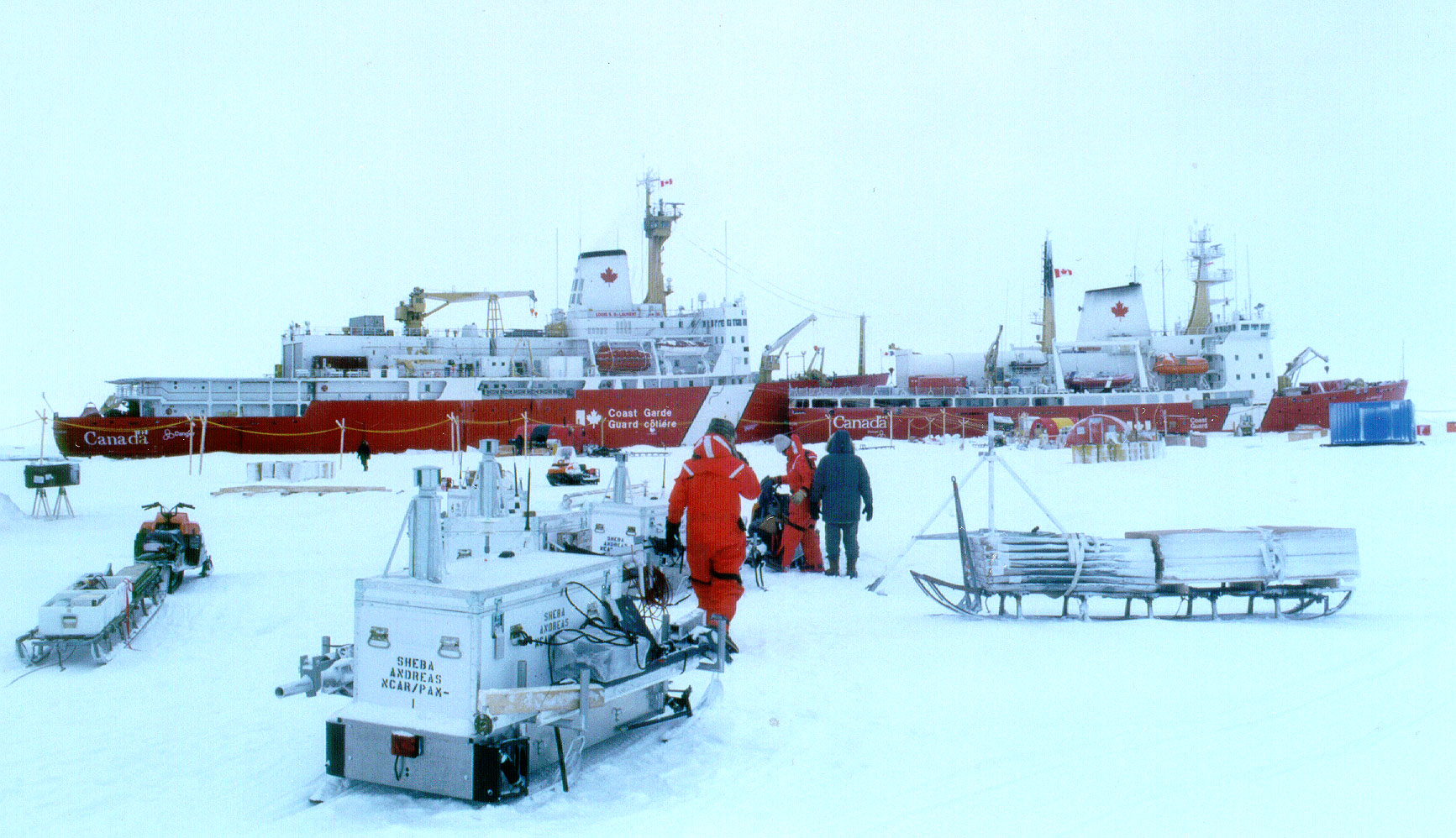
Ice station SHEBA base, Canadian Coast Guard Ship Des Groseilliers (right) with CCGS Louis S. St-Laurent

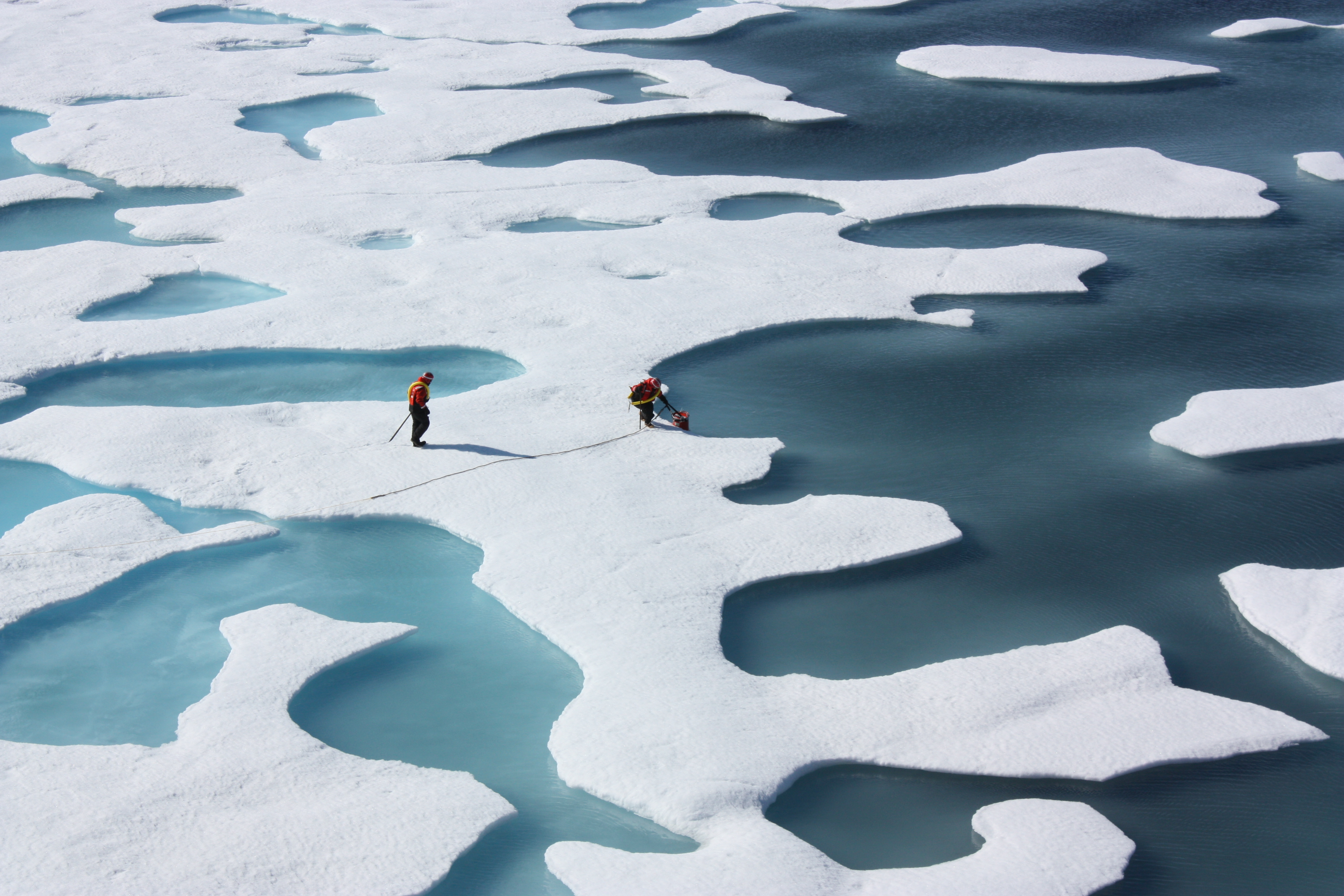
ICESCAPE crew crosses meltwater ponds to retrieve airdropped supplies, July 2011.

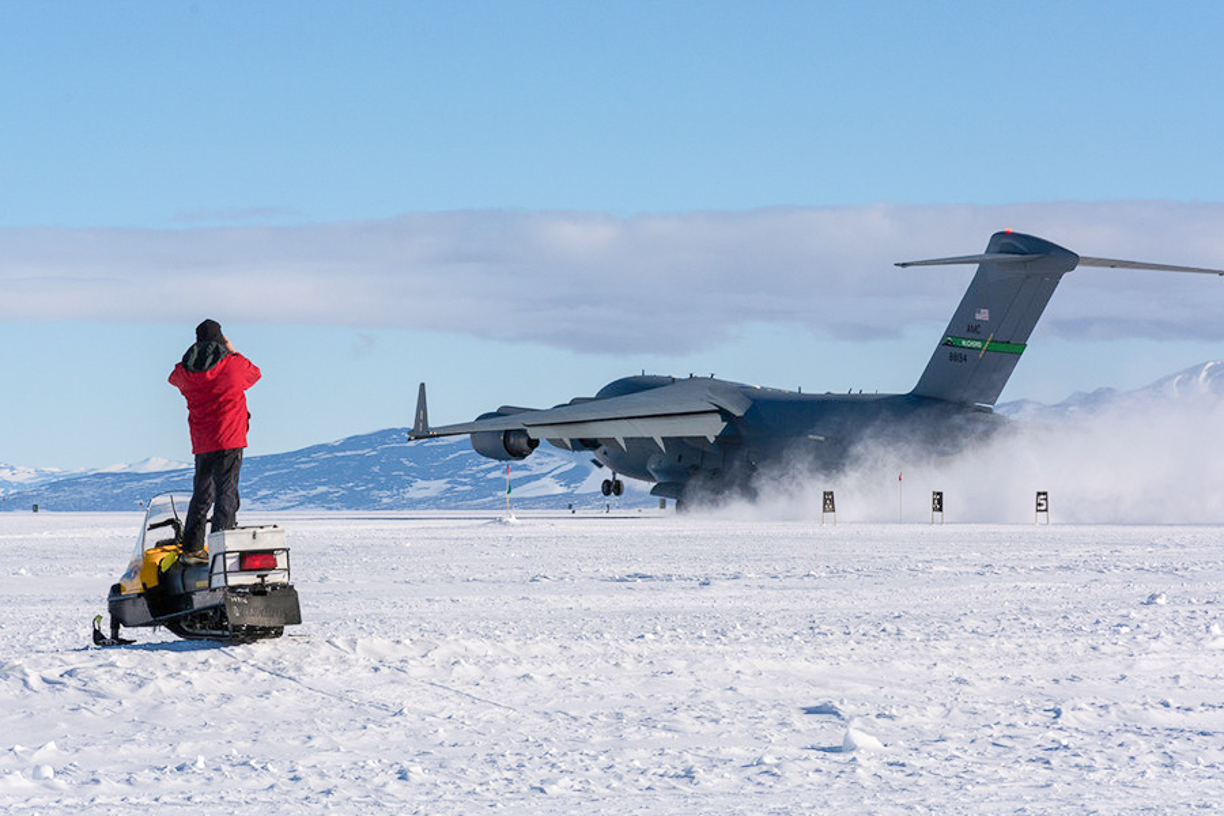
Research Civil Engineer monitoring the acceptance tests of the Phoenix Runway for wheeled aircraft at McMurdo Station as a Boeing C-17 takes off.

CRREL staff continued to make a mark in polar research, both in the Arctic and Antarctic. In the Arctic, CRREL researchers were active in modeling shipping in the Northern Sea Route and the Surface Heat Budget of the Arctic Ocean (SHEBA) experiment, conducted in the Arctic Ocean from October 1997 to October 1998 to provide polar input to global climate models. Other researchers performed traverses of Antarctica and Greenland to collect data, pertinent to global climate change. In 2010, a CRREL researcher was co-chief scientist on another icebreaker-based scientific mission, called "Impacts of Climate Change on Ecosystems and Chemistry of the Arctic Pacific Environment" or ICESCAPE, to determine "the impact of climate change on the biogeochemistry and ecology of the Chukchi and Beaufort Seas."

Other CRREL researchers developed ways to upgrade and maintain the research facilities of the U.S. National Science Foundation in Antarctica, including the design and construction of a new South Pole Station and developing criteria to allow modern aircraft to land on snow runways. CRREL staff explored and helped develop a new overland supply route across the Ross Ice Shelf over the Antarctic Range and the Antarctic ice cap to lower the cost of supplying the South Pole Station. In 2016, CRREL research civil engineers designed, built and tested a new snow runway for the McMurdo Station, called "Phoenix". It is designed to accommodate approximately 60 annual sorties of heavy, wheeled transport aircraft.

In its Corps of Engineers Civil Works mission, CRREL researchers developed innovative ways to avoid ice jams and databases to address the widespread occurrence of such problems. A substantial ice engineering facility was built to support modeling of these problems. A remote-sensing and GIS (geographic information system) facility and organization were established to better employ the resources of satellite imagery and mapping of information to address problems worldwide. Another major facility, the Frost Effects Research Facility, was built to study problems associated with airfields and roadways, subject to freeze-thaw. An automated loading machine was acquired to simulate the passage of vehicle and aircraft tires on pavements. In building technology, researchers helped develop statistical means to identify snow and icing loads throughout the United States and standards for measuring heat loss, roof moisture detection, and frost-protected shallow foundations.

==== Realignment ====
In October 1999, CRREL became a member of an umbrella organization of Corps of Engineers laboratories, called the Engineer Research and Development Center (ERDC). The consolidation of seven laboratories, the Coastal and Hydraulics, Environmental, Geotechnical and Structures, and Information Technology Laboratories in Vicksburg, Mississippi; the Construction Engineering Research Laboratory in Champaign, Illinois; CRREL in New Hampshire; and the Topographic Engineering Center in Alexandria, Virginia, established the ERDC in four geographic sites around the country.

==== Remediation of trichloroethylene spills ====
Originally, CRREL cold-room facilities used trichloroethylene (TCE) as a refrigerant. At the time there were few known environmental hazards attributed to TCE. Subsequently, TCE has been identified as a carcinogen. In 1970, an industrial accident resulted in a spill of approximately 3,000 gallons of TCE. In 1978, TCE was introduced into the ground via an experimental well. After the 1990 discovery of TCE in groundwater, CRREL embarked on a remediation plan, approved by the New Hampshire Department of Environmental Services (NHDES), with assistance from the U.S. Army Toxic and Hazardous Materials Agency and the Corps of Engineers New England Division. NHDES reports that CRREL no longer stores TCE on site and the remediation of TCE in the groundwater is subject to monitoring in test wells. According to an Army press release cited in the local newspaper, the Army expanded monitoring of TCE at other locations on the CRREL campus and found some elevated readings in 2011. Thereafter, they initiated a monitoring well and soil sampling program to map the concentrations of the substance on the site. The information gained should lead to a new cleanup strategy for the site, according to the 2012 report. Army environmental specialists have detected TCE at neighboring residential and school properties.

== Awards ==
=== Army Research and Development ===
The Army Research and Development Achievement Award is provided to distinguished researchers working within the Army laboratory system. Some notable CRREL recipients were:

- 1967 – Lyle Hanson for ice-core drilling in Greenland and Antarctica. Wilford Weeks for research on the formation and physical properties of sea ice.
- 1970 – Guenther Frankenstein for SS Manhattan work and assistance in recovery of a downed B-52.
- 1971 – James Hicks for fog-dispersion techniques for airfields.
- 1976 – Pieter Hoekstra, Paul Sellmann, Steven Arcone and Allan Delaney for developing subsurface geophysical exploration techniques, related to the Trans-Alaska Pipeline. Malcolm Mellor for research in the excavating and blasting of snow, ice and frozen ground, allowing rapid excavation of frozen ground and for cutting ice from lock walls, and the controlled blasting of a large ice wall in Antarctica to provide a pier for the docking of supply ships.
- 1977 – Malcolm Mellor for developing engineering principles instrumental to the design of excavating machines.
- 1978 – Wayne Tobiasson for the moving of a 10-story-high, 3,300-ton Distant Early Warning (DEW) Line facility on the Greenland Ice Cap, saving an estimated $1.5 million.
- 1979 – Frederick Crory for advice in the construction of the Trans-Alaska Pipeline, related to pile foundations in permafrost.
- 1980 – Wilford Weeks for establishing a scientific basis for engineering problems pertaining to floating ice, especially sea ice.
- 1982 – George Ashton for study of river and lake ice thermal processes, allowing control of ice formation with air bubblers and heated water discharges.
- 1983 – Michael Ferrick for assisting NASA in predicting ice formation on the super-cooled fuel tanks of the Space Shuttle Columbia. Yoshisuke Nakano, Joseph Oliphant and Allan Tice for use of nuclear magnetic resonance (NMR) techniques to investigate water content and transport in frozen soils. David Deck for the design of a frazil ice control structure to mitigate recurrent flooding.
- 1985 – Richard L. Berg, Edwin J. Chamberlain Jr., David M. Cole, and Thaddeus C. Johnson for techniques that allowed the calculation of heat and moisture flux during the freezing and thawing of pavement systems.
- 1986 – John H. Rand and Ben Hanamoto for developing a system for controlling ice on Army Corps of Engineers navigation locks.
- 1987 – Michael G. Ferrick for developing a theory of hydraulics that described river ice breakup. Thomas F. Jenkins Jr., and Daniel C. Leggett for a standard analytical method that determines residual explosive levels in waste water from Army ammunition plant. Malcolm Mellor, Mark F. Wait, Darryl J. Calkins, Barry A. Coutermarsh, and David A. L'Heureux for techniques to deploy ribbon bridge in rivers with an ice cover. Steven A. Arcone, Paul V. Sellman, and Allan J. Delaney for using geophysical techniques to characterize the subsurface properties of permafrost.
- 1988 – Edwin J. Chamberlain Jr., Iskander K. Iskander, and C. James Martel for techniques to process sewage sludge, dredged material, and sediments, and for decontamination of hazardous waste sites, using freezing. George L. Blaisdell for research on wheeled vehicles operating in snow. David S. Deck for using cooling pond water from a power generation plant to prevent formation of ice jams on rivers. Frederick C. Gernhard and Charles J. Korhonen for a device that rapidly repairs blisters on built-up roof membranes.
- 1989 – Rachel Jordon for an analytical model to predict the surface temperature of a snow cover.
- 1990 – Austin Kovacs and Rexford M. Morey for radar and electromagnetic induction systems that measure the thickness of sea ice and fresh water ice and their electromagnetic properties of sea ice, and an understanding of the rate of global warning.
- 1991 – Edgar L. Andreas for furthering understanding the effects of air turbulence on optical transmission.
- 1995 – Daniel Lawson, Steven Arcone, and Allan Delaney for ground penetrating radar techniques to characterize subsurface hazardous and toxic waste. James Welsh and George Koenig for pioneering synthetic thermal infrared scene generation capability.
- 1996 – Donald G. Albert for theories that describe acoustic and seismic propagation in the presence of frozen ground or snow.
- 1998 – Kathleen F. Jones for a new national standard map for design ice loading on such structures as power lines and communication towers.
- 2001 – Robert E. Davis for advancing physical theories associated with state-of-the-ground modeling, hydrology, and remote sensing.
- 2004 – D. Keith Wilson for a sound propagation theory and modeling that allows realistic simulations of atmospheric acoustical effects, using quasi-wavelets that describe atmospheric turbulence.
- 2005 – D. Keith Wilson (with Sandra L. Collier and David H. Martin) for sound propagation theory and modeling, using time-domain theory and numerical methods for sound propagation in porous materials and moving, turbulent fluids, also for incorporation of scattering by atmospheric turbulence calculations of sound propagation.
- 2008 – Steven Arcone, Yeohoon Koh, and Lanbo Liu for understanding radiowave propagation over terrain, using a Doppler approach to measure forward scattering of radiowaves at near grazing angles. Antonio Palazzo and Timothy Cary for development of new germplasms for use on military training ranges.
- 2009 – David Cole and Mark Hopkins (with John Peters) for integrating knowledge of granular materials through discrete element modeling as validated by experimental results.

=== Army laboratory awards ===
As a laboratory, CRREL received Army awards for excellence in 1975 and 1978. In 1991 and 1994 CRREL won the Army Laboratory of the Year award for excellence. In 1997 the laboratory won the overall Army Laboratory of the Year award. After joining ERDC in 1999, CRREL has been a consistent contributor of accomplishments that allowed ERDC became a frequent winner of the Army Research Laboratory of the Year award, five times in its first eight years.
