= Byer, Ohio =

- Unincorporated community
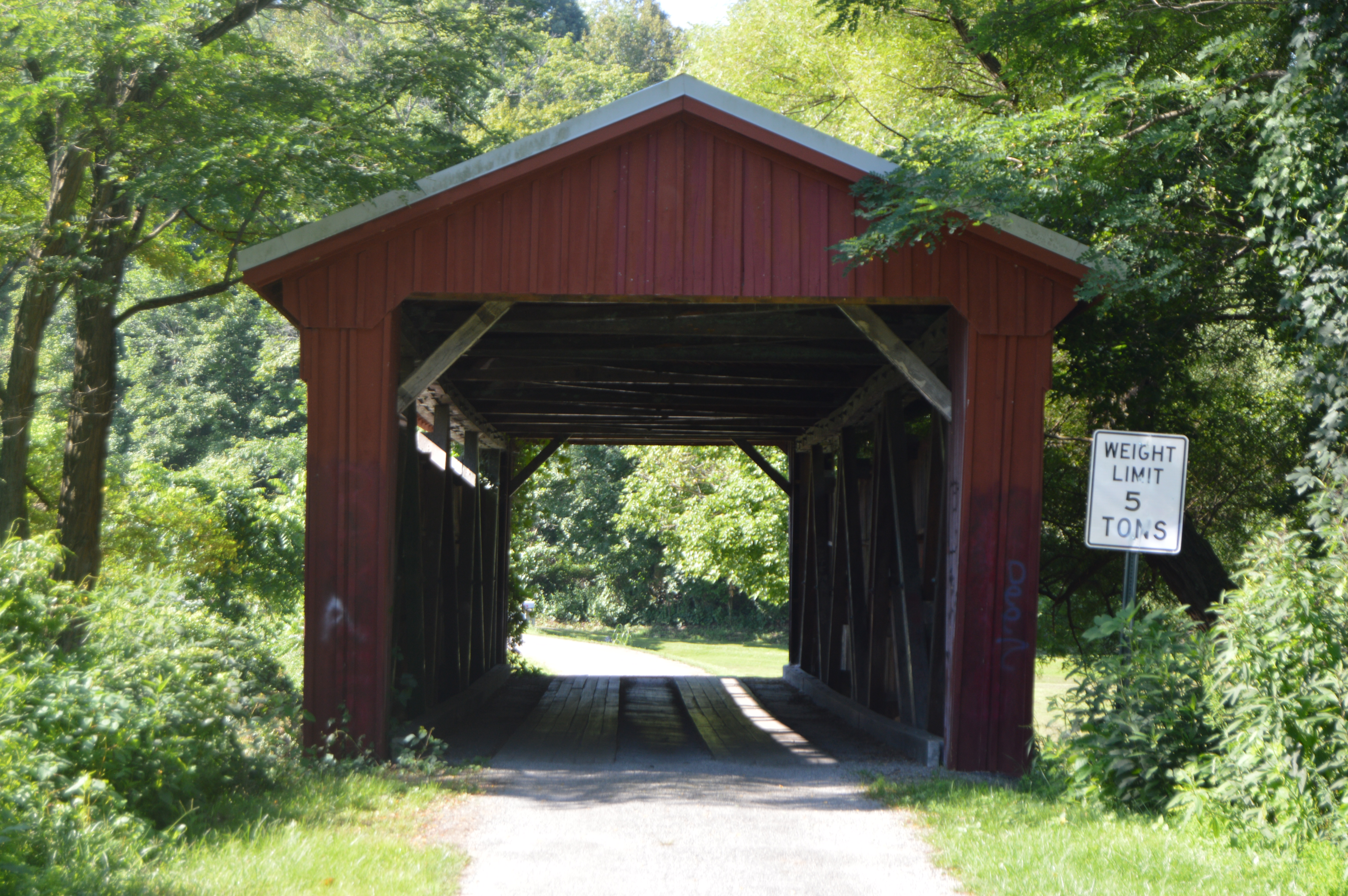
- Byer Covered Bridge

- Location within Ohio
- Coordinates: 39°10′53″N 82°37′53″W
- Country: United States
- State: Ohio
- Counties: Jackson
- Elevation: 637 ft (194 m)
- Time zone: UTC-5 (Eastern (EST))
  - Summer (DST): UTC-4 (EDT)
- ZIP code: 45692
- Area code: 740
- GNIS feature ID: 1056746

Byer is an unincorporated community in northwestern Washington Township, Jackson County, Ohio, United States. It lies along State Route 327 between Wellston and Londonderry.

== History ==
Prior to the Civil War, Byer was known as Ellsworth, but the name was changed to Byers Station in honor of the Byers family, local landowners. The Byers Station Post Office was established on June 5, 1871. The town name was shortened to Byer on November 29, 1882, and ultimately the post office was discontinued November 29, 1882. Mail service is now handled by the Wellston branch.

The Byer Covered Bridge, is located here. Built in 1870, it is listed on the National Register of Historic Places.

Pigeon Creek, a subsidiary of the Scioto River through Salt Creek, runs along the western edge of Byer.
