= Harvey Wells House =

Historic building in Wellston, Ohio

- U.S. National Register of Historic Places
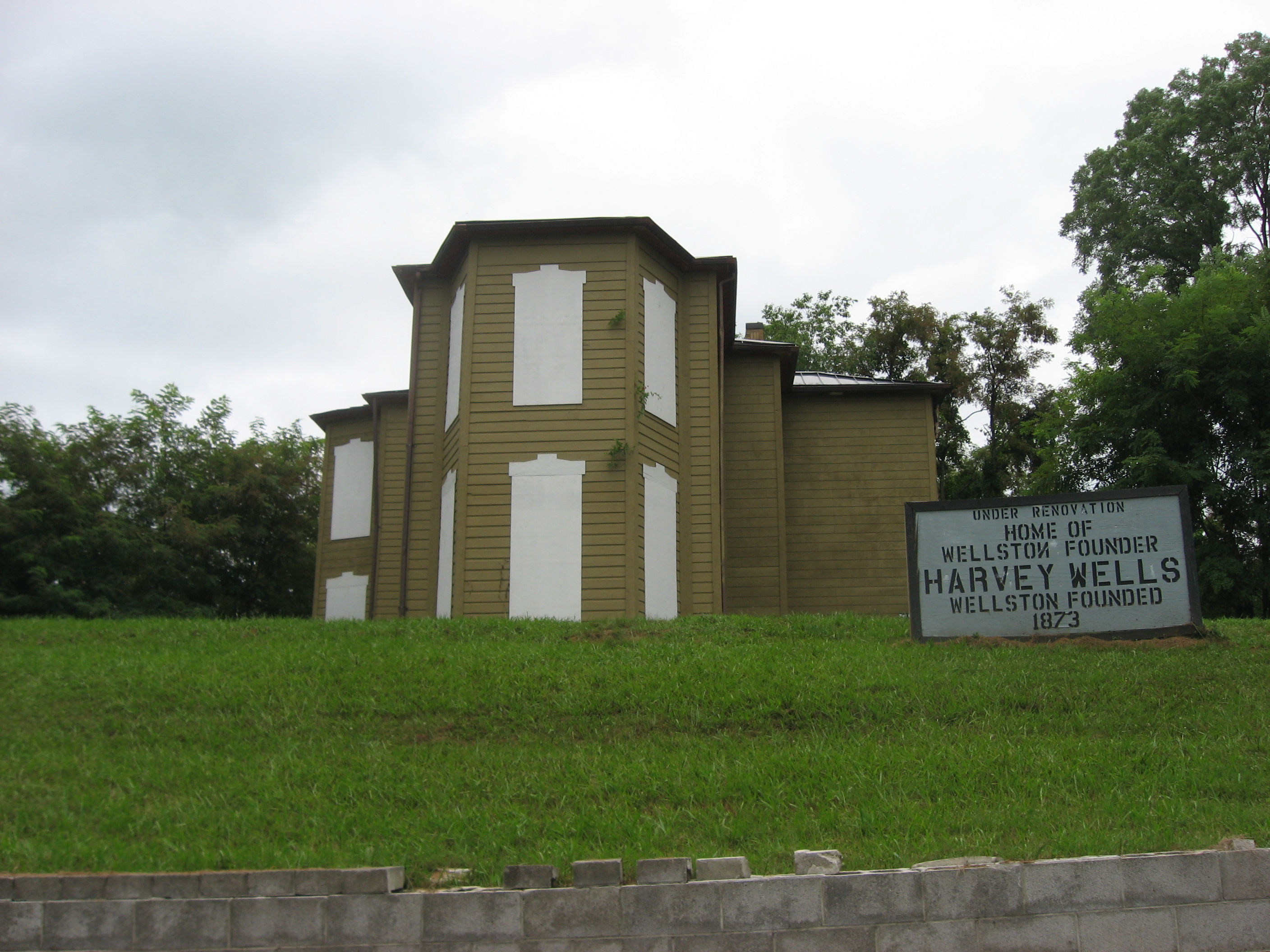
- Front of the house during renovation

- Location within Ohio Location within the United States
- Location: 407 E. A Street, Wellston, Ohio
- Coordinates: 39°7′28″N 82°31′49″W
- Built: 1883
- Architectural style: Italianate, Victorian
- NRHP reference No.: 09000211
- Added to NRHP: April 14, 2009

The Harvey Wells House is a historic residence in the city of Wellston in the southern part of the U.S. state of Ohio. Built in 1883, it was the home of Harvey Wells, a local entrepreneur who founded the city of Wellston in the 1870s with the goal of making it into the region's leading metropolis. Located on the A Street Hill, the house occupies one of the highest points in the city of Wellston.

The Wells House is a frame structure two stories tall, constructed in a mix of the Victorian and the Italianate styles of architecture. Built on a foundation of sandstone, the house features weatherboarded exterior walls, an aluminum roof, and details of brick. Despite succeeding in his attempts to found a city in northeastern Jackson County and in rebuilding the community after it was afflicted by widespread fire in 1888, Harvey Wells was chronically deep in debt. After his death in 1896, the house was emptied of many of its contents, as his furniture had to be sold to reduce the debt that embarrassed his estate. He never owned the house or the land upon which it sits.

During the mid-2000s, the home was acquired by the city through a donation from local businessman, Jerry Bobst. From there a restoration program was started, due in part to an appropriation of $100,000 in the state government's 2005–2006 budget. The first phase of reconstruction, which consisted of basic preservation efforts and stabilization, was completed by the end of 2005. Plans were then approved for the second and third phases, consisting of exterior renovation and interior renovation respectively. Further work was performed under the leadership of architects specializing in historic preservation, starting in early 2010; the Wellston Historical Association commissioned this restoration in the hope of converting the property into a historic house museum. Besides necessary restorations, the contract also involved the addition of new elements, including an office, restrooms, a small porch, electrical wiring and plumbing, and central heating and air conditioning systems. Throughout this process, the Historical Association oversaw reconstruction efforts, with the property remaining in the ownership of the city of Wellston.

In 2009, the Harvey Wells House was listed on the National Register of Historic Places, due to its significant place as the home of the city's founder. It is one of three Wellston buildings included on the Register, along with the Clutts House and the Morgan Mansion.
