= Oak Hill Welsh Congregational Church =

- U.S. National Register of Historic Places
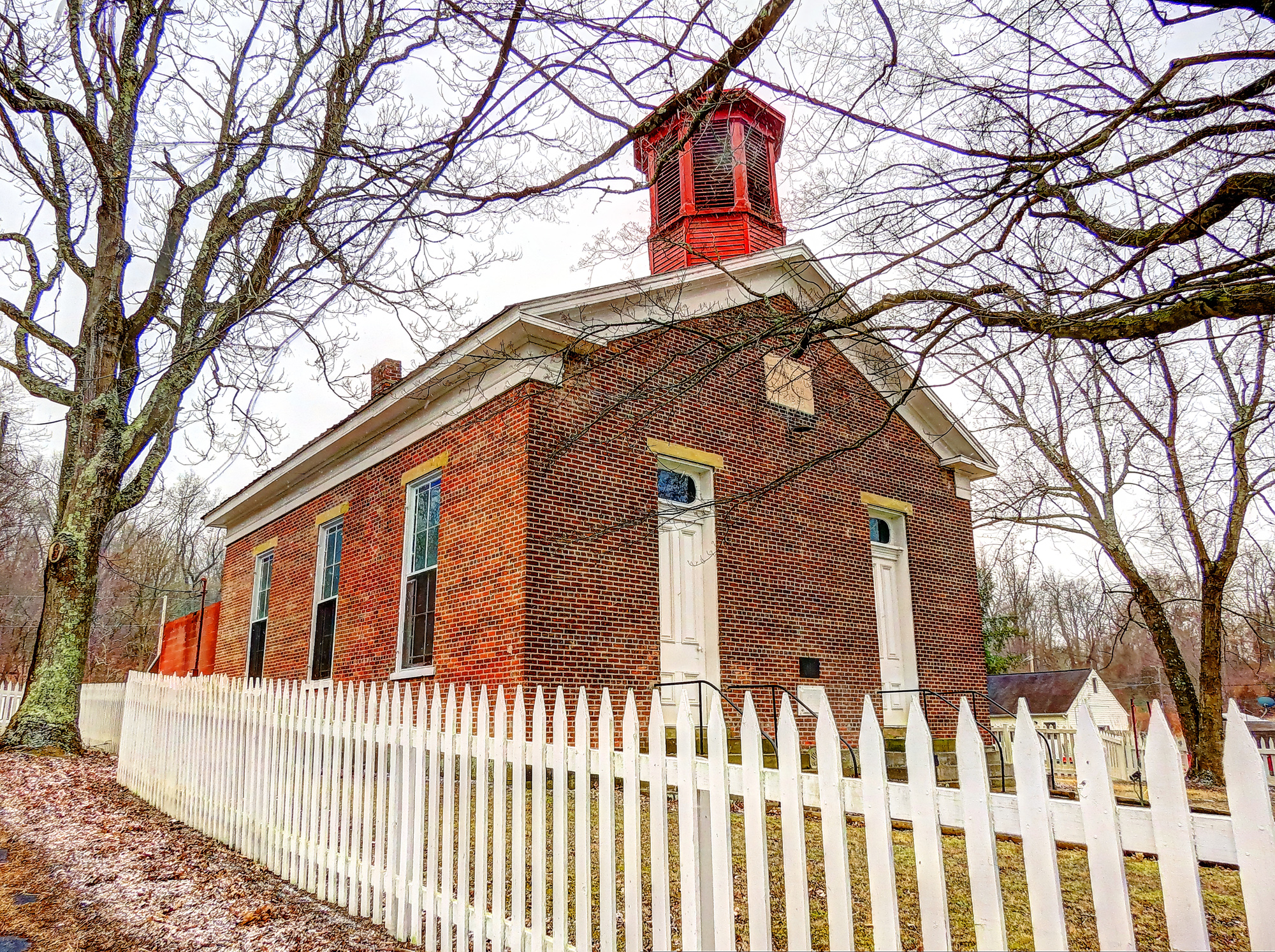
- Front and side

- Location within Ohio Location within the United States
- Location: 412 E. Main St., Oak Hill, Ohio
- Coordinates: 38°53′44″N 82°34′9″W
- Area: Less than 1 acre (0.40 ha)
- Built: 1868
- Architect: Isaac Parry; Thomas Herbert
- Architectural style: Greek Revival
- NRHP reference No.: 78002090
- Added to NRHP: May 23, 1978

The Oak Hill Welsh Congregational Church is a historic former church in the village of Oak Hill, Ohio, United States. It was originally home to a congregation of Welsh immigrant miners, and it has been named a historic site.

Welsh miners from Cardiganshire began immigrating to the Hanging Rock region of southern Ohio as early as 1818, working in the blast furnaces and iron mines of the region. Some of them were Congregationalists, and some who established themselves in Jackson County formed a church in 1832. Nine years later, the church moved into Oak Hill, but their church building was not finished until 1869.

The church building is a brick structure with a tin roof and foundation of sandstone. Its primary builders, Isaac Parry and Thomas Herbert, produced a Greek Revival structure; although just one story tall, it features a bell tower atop the roof. The building as a whole is a simple rectangle, although the bell tower is octagonal.

Following decades of decline, the congregation disorganized in 1962; local Baptists bought the building, but after nine years they moved to a new structure. In 1972, local residents of Welsh descent purchased the former church and began operating it as a museum of Welsh culture, the "Welsh-American Heritage Museum". It has since become associated with the Welsh studies center at the nearby University of Rio Grande.

In 1978, the church was listed on the National Register of Historic Places, qualifying both because of its architecture and because of its role in local religious and ethnic history. It is one of twelve Jackson County locations on the Register.
