= Oak Hill, Ohio =

Village in Jackson County, Ohio, US

- Village
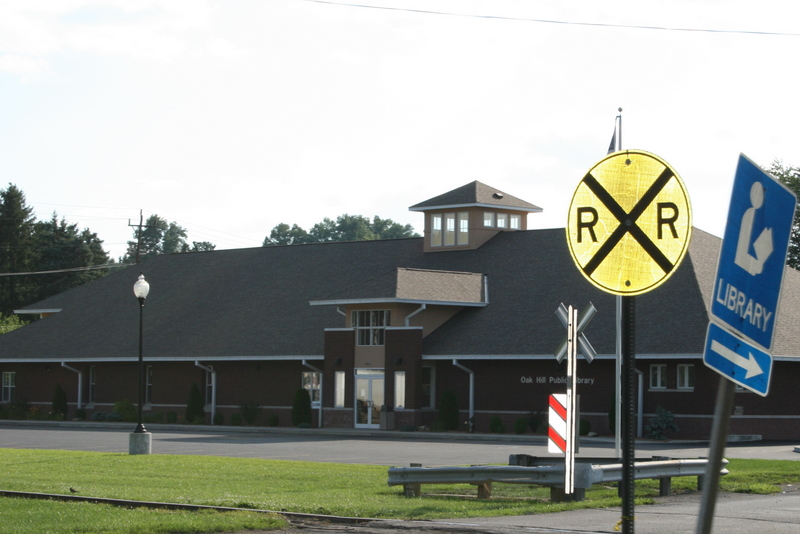
- Oak Hill Public Library

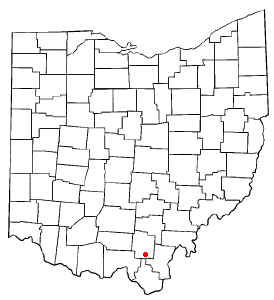
- Location of Oak Hill, Ohio

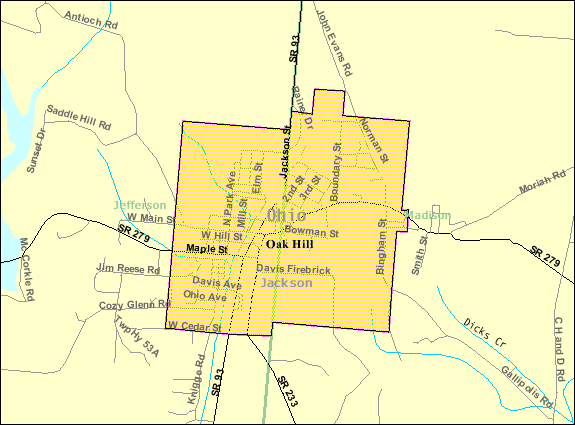
- Detailed map of Oak Hill
- Coordinates: 38°53′50″N 82°34′10″W
- Country: United States
- State: Ohio
- County: Jackson

Government
  - Mayor: Paul McNeal

Area
  - Total: 1.27 sq mi (3.29 km^{2})
  - Land: 1.27 sq mi (3.29 km^{2})
  - Water: 0 sq mi (0.00 km^{2})
- Elevation: 715 ft (218 m)

Population (2020)
  - Total: 1,407
  - Density: 1,107.3/sq mi (427.54/km^{2})
- Time zone: UTC-5 (Eastern (EST))
  - Summer (DST): UTC-4 (EDT)
- ZIP code: 45656
- Area code: 740
- FIPS code: 39-57596
- GNIS feature ID: 2399537
- Website: www.oakhillvillage.net

Oak Hill is a village in Jackson County, Ohio, United States. The population was 1,407 at the 2020 census.

== History ==
The Village of Oak Hill was officially formed on January 12, 1873, from portions of Jefferson and Madison Townships.

Many immigrants from Cardiganshire, Wales, had previously settled in the area, with the first arriving in the Gallia/ Jackson County area in 1818 and many more in the late 1830s and 1840s- an era referred to as "The Great Welsh Tide". Several Welsh churches were constructed in the Oak Hill Area in the 19th Century, with some of them conducting services in the Welsh Language in to the 1920s. The Welsh-American Heritage Museum is located in the former Welsh Congregational Church on East Main St in the village.

Oak Hill's early industrial history included Jefferson Furnace (which is acclaimed for producing Iron for the Iron Clad Monitor) being located a couple miles west of the Village and other iron furnaces being located in the surrounding region. The Firebrick Industry began developing in the Oak Hill area in the 1870s and had a profound impact on the village economically into the mid 20th Century. Few firebrick related businesses operate in the Oak Hill area to date.

The Oak Hill Union Local School District was formed around 1890, with the first graduating class of Oak Hill High School being the Class of 1893. The current Oak Hill High School was opened in August 2003. A new football stadium, the multi-million dollar Davis Stadium was opened in 2006. A new baseball field, and then a new softball field were built several years later. The Oak Hill High School Boys Basketball Team were the Division IV State Champions in 2009.

The Lady Oak (girls basketball) team were state runners-up in 2004, 2009, and 2011 under head coach Doug Hale.

== Geography ==
According to the United States Census Bureau, the village has a total area of 1.14 square miles (2.95 km^{2}), all land.

== Demographics ==
Historical population
Census	Pop.	Note	%±
1880	646		—
1890	657		1.7%
1900	825		25.6%
1910	1,148		39.2%
1920	1,394		21.4%
1930	1,578		13.2%
1940	1,619		2.6%
1950	1,615		−0.2%
1960	1,748		8.2%
1970	1,642		−6.1%
1980	1,713		4.3%
1990	1,831		6.9%
2000	1,685		−8.0%
2010	1,551		−8.0%
2020	1,407		−9.3%
U.S. Decennial Census

=== 2010 census ===
As of the census of 2010, there were 1,551 people, 624 households, and 386 families living in the village. The population density was 1,360.5 inhabitants per square mile (525.3/km^{2}). There were 687 housing units at an average density of 602.6 per square mile (232.7/km^{2}). The racial makeup of the village was 97.5% White, 0.5% African American, 0.2% Native American, 0.3% Asian, and 1.6% from two or more races. Hispanic or Latino of any race were 0.3% of the population.

As of 2010 the largest self-identified ancestry/ethnic groups in Oak Hill were:

- American 12.8%
- German 10.8%
- Welsh 10.3%
- Irish 5.7%
- English 5.4%
- French 1.2%
- Scots-Irish 1.1%

There were 624 households, of which 32.1% had children under the age of 18 living with them, 43.8% were married couples living together, 14.1% had a female householder with no husband present, 4.0% had a male householder with no wife present, and 38.1% were non-families. 31.4% of all households were made up of individuals, and 15.8% had someone living alone who was 65 years of age or older. The average household size was 2.49 and the average family size was 3.12.

The median age in the village was 36.3 years. 25.2% of residents were under the age of 18; 10% were between the ages of 18 and 24; 24.4% were from 25 to 44; 25.4% were from 45 to 64; and 15% were 65 years of age or older. The gender makeup of the village was 47.6% male and 52.4% female.

=== 2000 census ===
As of the census of 2000, there were 1,685 people, 673 households, and 458 families living in the village. The population density was 1,474.5 inhabitants per square mile (569.3/km^{2}). There were 739 housing units at an average density of 646.7 per square mile (249.7/km^{2}). The racial makeup of the village was 98.28% White, 0.24% African American, 0.42% Native American, 0.24% Asian, 0.12% from other races, and 0.71% from two or more races. Hispanic or Latino of any race were 0.12% of the population.

There were 673 households, out of which 34.3% had children under the age of 18 living with them, 49.2% were married couples living together, 14.6% had a female householder with no husband present, and 31.8% were non-families. 27.8% of all households were made up of individuals, and 13.7% had someone living alone who was 65 years of age or older. The average household size was 2.44 and the average family size was 2.95.

In the village, the population was spread out, with 25.3% under the age of 18, 8.7% from 18 to 24, 29.6% from 25 to 44, 19.8% from 45 to 64, and 16.6% who were 65 years of age or older. The median age was 35 years. For every 100 females, there were 82.0 males. For every 100 females age 18 and over, there were 78.4 males.

The median income for a household in the village was $28,289, and the median income for a family was $31,898. Males had a median income of $28,750 versus $20,438 for females. The per capita income for the village was $13,580. About 14.2% of families and 20.6% of the population were below the poverty line, including 29.4% of those under age 18 and 24.7% of those age 65 or over.

== Arts and culture ==
The Welsh-American Heritage Museum, located in the Oak Hill Welsh Congregational Church, was the first Welsh museum in the United States, and houses Welsh books, bibles, documents, pictures, and a collection of other Welsh items. The World's Largest Acorn, located in Central Memorial Park in the Village, was erected on June 14th, 2025. The Acorn sculpture is planned to be a stop on The Ohio Arts Corridor.

== Government ==
Oak Hill is governed by an elected six member council. The mayor is Paul McNeal.
