= Buckeye Township, Shannon County, Missouri =

Defunct township in the American state of Missouri

Coordinates: 37.1439375°N 91.2529098°W

Buckeye Township is a defunct township in Shannon County, in the U.S. state of Missouri.

Buckeye Township was established in 1901, and named for the buckeye trees within its borders.
