= Controlled image base =

Data pack for unclassified military digital imagery

Controlled image base or CIB is unclassified digital imagery, produced to support mission planning and command, control, communications, and intelligence systems. CIB is sometimes used as a map substitute during emergencies or crises in the event that maps do not exist or are outdated. CIB is produced from SPOT commercial imagery that has been orthonormalized using the National Geospatial-Intelligence Agency (NGA)'s DTED. CIB is RPF and NITF compliant. (Source: FAS)
