= Buckeye rot of tomato =

Fungal plant disease

Buckeye rot of tomato is caused by three species of pathogens in the genus Phytophthora: P. nicotianae var. parasitica, P. capsici, and P. drechsleri. It is an oomycete that thrives in warm, wet conditions and lives in the soil. It is characterized by a bull’s eye pattern of dark brown rotting on the tomato fruit, and affects fruit that is close to, or lying on the soil. The easiest management is to keep the plant out of contact with the soil, although other chemical methods can be very effective. This disease commonly occurs in the southeast and south central areas of the United States. The disease has affected a large portion of crop yield in the United States as well as India. The relatively small genome size of Phytophthora parasitica compared to Phytophthora infestans gives researchers the unique ability to further examine its ability to cause disease.

== Hosts and symptoms ==
Buckeye rot of tomato affects tomato plants, although there are many other plants that are affected, including pepper, potato, tobacco, pineapple, and various other hosts. Upon infection, brown and greyish-green water-soaked spots appear on the fruit. These spots develop into lesions that resemble the markings of a bull's eye with alternating dark and light brown concentric rings. These are very smooth lesions, barely raised, unlike the rough lesions found in late blight (Phytophthora infestans), which is a similar pathogen. Buckeye rot lesions may cover half or more of the fruit and the margins of lesions will be smooth but not sharply defined. Finally, a white fungal-like growth may appear within the lesion. While fruit rot is the most common symptom, damping off and stem cankers are possible. The disease does not affect the foliage of the plant, which further helps separate it from late blight .

== Disease cycle ==
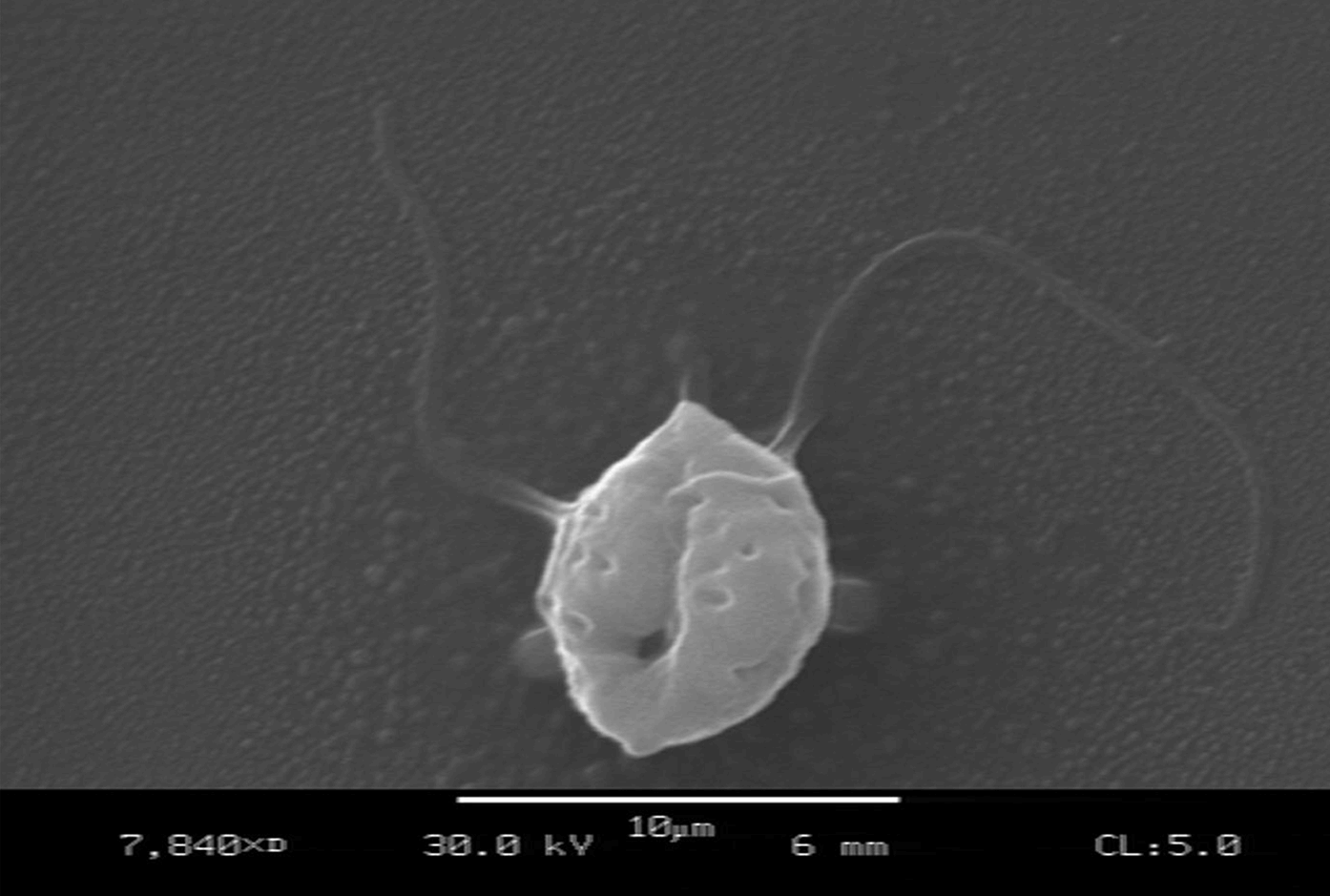
Zoospores - Reproductive Structure of the Phytophthora

Buckeye rot of tomato is soil-borne and therefore affects fruit lying on, or close to, the soil. The fungi are spread by surface water, spattering rain, and furrow irrigation. While it can sexually reproduce through the production of oospores, its primary form of reproduction is by asexually producing sporangia. These sporangia are found at the tips of sporangiophores that emerge through the stomates. Sporangia release zoospores which require water for transport. Zoospores swim in water droplets until they encyst and infect the fruit. Symptoms, beginning with fruit rot, may form within 24 hours. Chlamydospores are the pathogen's resting structure, which allows the disease to survive and overwinter in the soil. The chlamydospores germinate in soil or decaying debris. Through these chlamydospores, the pathogen begins the disease cycle again. The combination of asexual and sexual spores makes this disease polycyclic, therefore it can infect multiple times throughout a season.

== Environment ==
Buckeye rot is favored by warm, wet weather. Temperatures between 75 and 86 °F (24 and 30 °C) are ideal for the fruit rot. In order for sporangia to be produced, allowing the pathogen to reproduce, the soil must be wet and above 65 °F (18 °C). Zoospores can only disseminate by swimming in water, so excessive rain and irrigation promote growth of the disease. Oospores, on the other hand, can be spread across a field by water runoff, farming equipment, and workers.

=== Management ===
Because there are currently no disease-resistant varieties, cultural and chemical control are the only management options.

==== Cultural control ====
Once the pathogen is in the soil, avoid fluctuation in moisture, compacting soil, and prevent flooding by providing good drainage. Specifically, keep the tops of the bed dry to avoid the fruit rot. This will provide a less than ideal environment for the pathogen to survive and grow. Crop rotations every 3 to 4 years can be another alternative to control the disease. Since the pathogen is found in the soil, avoiding contact of the fruit with the soil can decrease infection. You can do this by using plant stakes or support cages that will hang the plants above the soil. Another control is mulching with newspapers, plastic, and other materials that will prohibit soil from splashing up on the plants during heavy rainfall.

==== Chemical control ====
Applying fungicides that contain chlorothalonil, maneb, mancozeb, or metalaxyl as the main ingredient on a regular schedule will help to eliminate the pathogen. You can also apply fungicides containing mefenoxam to the soil surface under the vines around 4–8 weeks prior to harvest. A third practice to help control the disease is to spray with another fungicide, difolatan, 4 times over a 10-day period. Soil should be fumigated before anything else is planted in previously-infected soil.

== Importance ==
=== United States ===
One of the first reports of buckeye rot of tomato occurred in Florida in 1917. Later, in 1921 the first epidemic of it occurred in an experimental field in Indiana. It persisted throughout the summer infecting other hosts as well. It resulted in destroying up to 40 percent of the tomato plants grown. In Maryland, tomatoes are the second most important vegetable crop grown, accounting for 8.6 million dollars in profit. Annually, 25–30 short tons (23–27 t) of tomatoes are processed in Maryland. Tomatoes are also the second most economically important vegetable in Pennsylvania. Fresh tomatoes account for 2.1 million dollars in cash receipts and 26–28 thousand short tons (24,000–25,000 tonnes) are produced by growers every year. Buckeye rot is one of the most important diseases to control in Pennsylvania. Maryland is able to manage it through a combination of chemical and non-chemical treatment, whereas in Pennsylvania, buckeye rot of tomato is controlled through a three-year crop rotation schedule.

=== India ===
In 2013, the Hindustan Times reported that in India, buckeye rot of tomato has led to damage in 30–40 percent of tomato crops. In 2012, the price of a tomato in India ranged from 0.20-0.33 dollars per kg; however, in 2013 when the disease hit, the price rose to 0.33-0.65 dollars per kg.

== See also ==
- Phytophthora infestans
- Oomycete
