= Morgan Mansion =

Historic house in Ohio, United States

- U.S. National Register of Historic Places
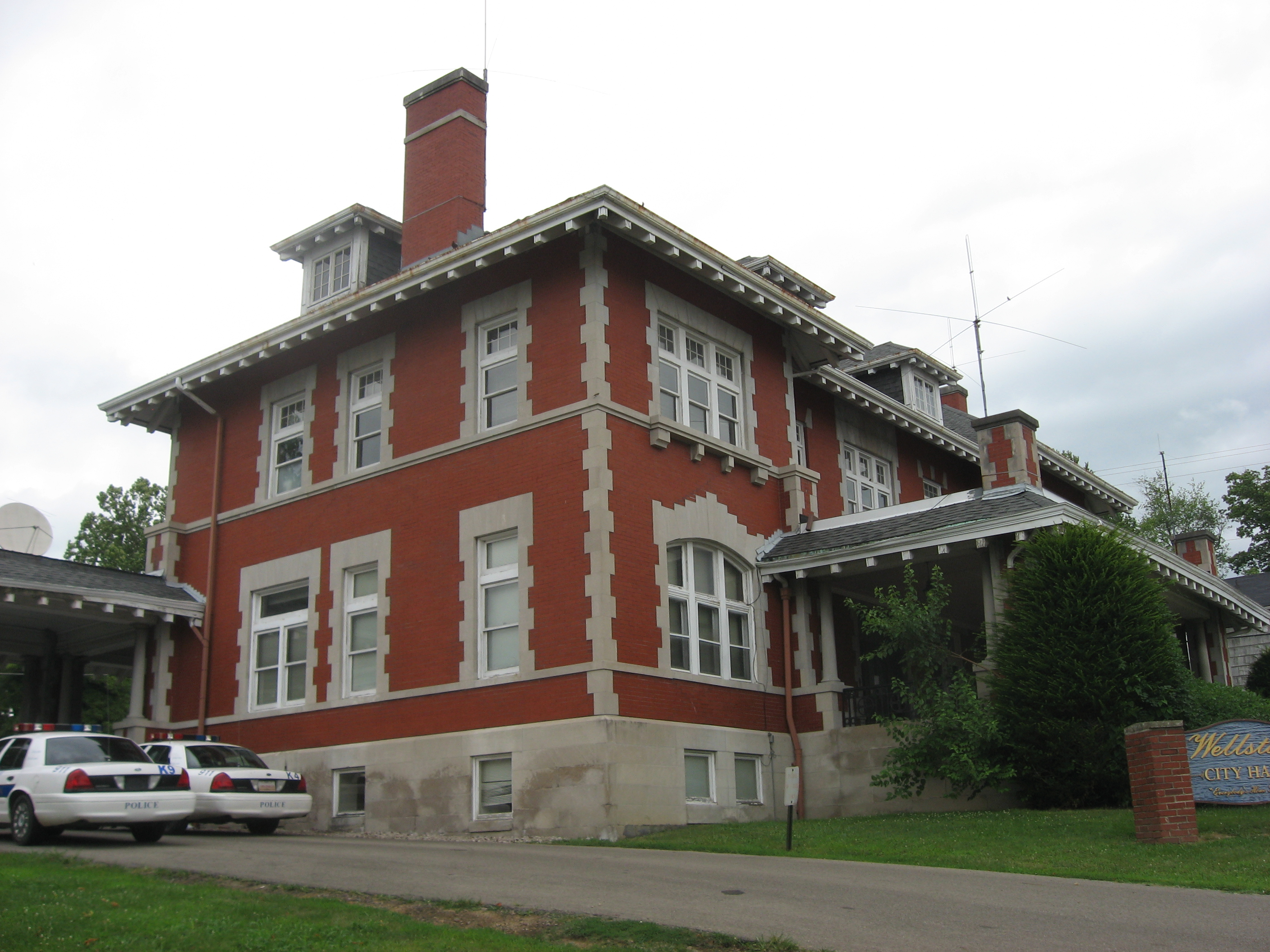
- Front and side of the house

- Location within Ohio Location within the United States
- Location: Broadway and Pennsylvania Aves., Wellston, Ohio
- Coordinates: 39°7′25″N 82°31′59″W
- Area: Less than 1 acre (0.40 ha)
- Built: 1905
- Architect: Wilbur Mills
- NRHP reference No.: 79001867
- Added to NRHP: February 16, 1979

The Morgan Mansion is a historic residence in and the current city hall of Wellston, Ohio, United States. Built in 1905, it was the home of one of Jackson County's leading industrialists, T.J. Morgan, and it has been designated a historic site.

Morgan entered the iron and coal business in Wellston in 1884, when he established the Wellston Coal and Iron Company. By 1905, he had become sufficiently wealthy to commission the design of his home from leading Columbus architect Wilbur Mills. Mills' design was a brick building with a stone foundation, an asphalt roof, and elements of stone and iron. Rather than being of a single architectural style, the two-and-a-half-story house is a mix of Jacobethan and Spanish Mission Revival architecture. The various structural elements combine to make the Morgan Mansion more architecturally significant than any other building in the city. Morgan himself died just three years after the house was erected.

Thirty years after Morgan arranged for its construction, the house was purchased by the city of Wellston and converted into its city hall, a purpose that it continues to serve to the present day. In 1979, it was listed on the National Register of Historic Places, qualifying both because of its historically significant architecture and its place as the home of a leading local citizen. It is one of three National Register-listed buildings in the city, along with the Clutts House, the home of another prominent mining executive, and the Harvey Wells House, the home of the city's founder.
