= Buckeye, Ohio =

- Unincorporated community
- Location within Ohio
- Coordinates: 39°03′16″N 82°27′33″W
- Country: United States
- State: Ohio
- Counties: Jackson
- Elevation: 643 ft (196 m)
- Time zone: UTC-5 (Eastern (EST))
  - Summer (DST): UTC-4 (EDT)
- ZIP code: 45692
- Area code: 740
- GNIS feature ID: 1062671

Buckeye is an unincorporated community in Milton Township, Jackson County, Ohio, United States.

Buckeye was founded as a company town for the local Buckeye Furnace, built around 1850 and listed on the National Register of Historic Places in 1975. Another local site on the list is the Buckeye Furnace Covered Bridge.
