= Petersburg, Jackson County, Ohio =

Petersburg, Ohio
- Unincorporated community
- Location within Ohio
- Coordinates: 38°59′23″N 82°44′40″W
- Country: United States
- State: Ohio
- Counties: Jackson
- Elevation: 732 ft (223 m)
- Time zone: UTC-5 (Eastern (EST))
  - Summer (DST): UTC-4 (EDT)
- ZIP code: 45640
- Area code: 740
- GNIS feature ID: 1062936

Petersburg is an unincorporated community in Scioto Township, Jackson County, Ohio, United States. It is located southwest of Jackson along Ohio State Route 776 at its intersection with Petersburg Road at 38°59′23″N 82°44′40″W.

The Johnson Road Covered Bridge is located just southwest of Petersburg, on Johnson Road.
