= Buckeye, Plumas County, California =

Buckeye
- Named location
- Location in California Buckeye (the United States)
- Coordinates: 39°47′44″N 121°18′15″W
- Country: United States
- State: California
- County: Plumas County
- Elevation: 4,997 ft (1,523 m)

Buckeye is a former travel station about halfway along the Oroville–Quincy Highway in Plumas County, California, near the border with Butte County. It lay at an elevation of 4,997 feet (1,523 m). The station stood as late as 1866, when it was noted in the Plumas County boundary survey.
