= Waterways Experiment Station =

- U.S. National Register of Historic Places
- U.S. Historic district
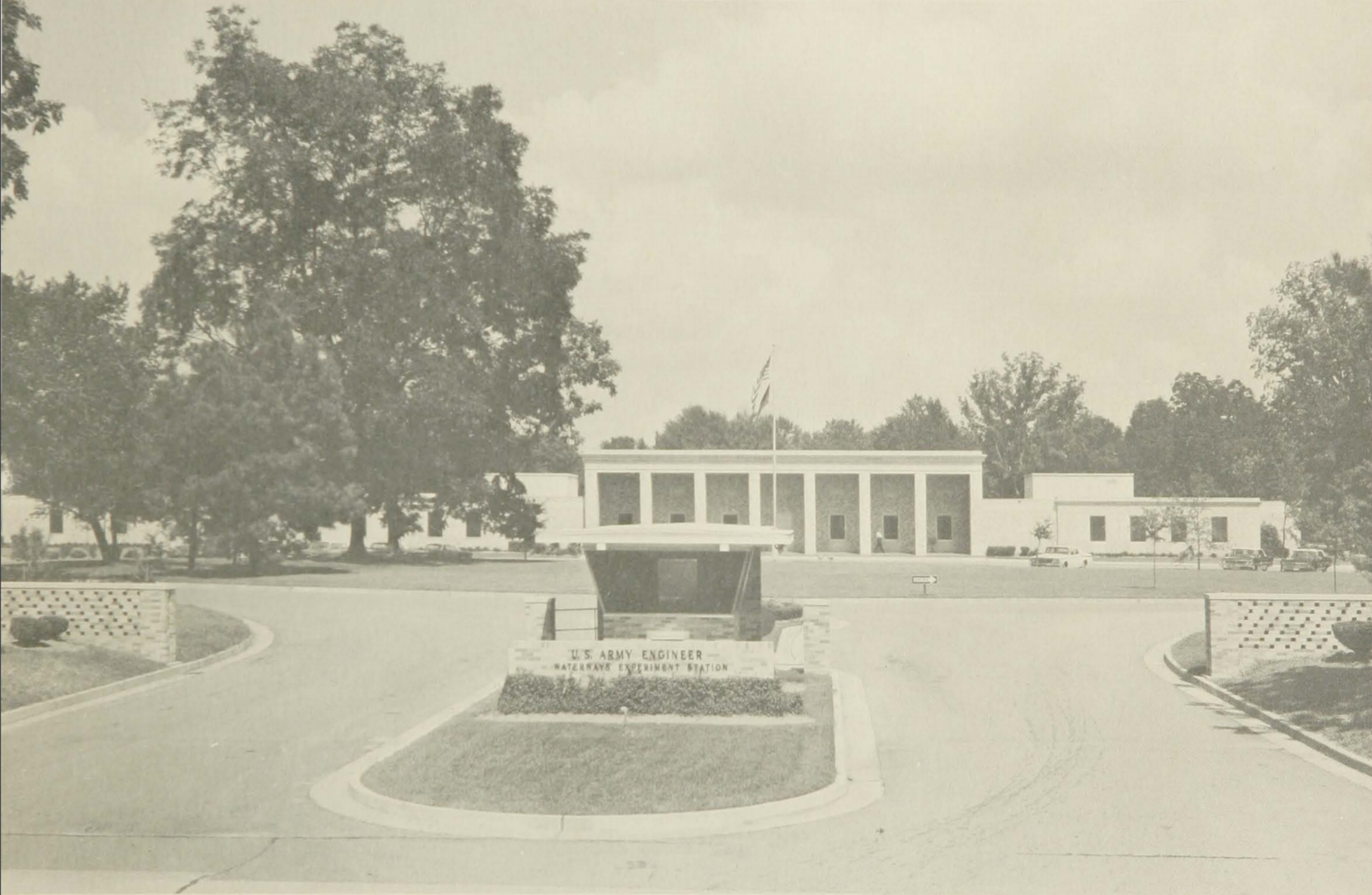
- Entrance to WES (1968).

- Location within Mississippi Location within the United States
- Location: Roughly bounded by Spillway, Durden Creek, Tennessee Rd., and Dam Spillway, Vicksburg, Mississippi
- Coordinates: 32°17′50″N 90°52′10″W
- Area: 673 acres (272 ha)
- Built: 1930
- Architect: US Army Corps of Engineers
- Architectural style: WES
- NRHP reference No.: 00001511
- Added to NRHP: December 13, 2000

The Waterways Experiment Station (WES) is a United States Army Corps of Engineers research campus in Vicksburg, Mississippi. The 673-acre (272 ha) campus hosts the headquarters of the Engineer Research and Development Center (ERDC) and four of its seven laboratories. Congress authorized the research complex in 1929 to develop flood control methods on the Mississippi River, as part of the Mississippi River and Tributaries Project. Subsequent research delved into topics, including coastal engineering, dredging, weapons effects, and geotechnical engineering.

The facility was listed on the U.S. National Register of Historic Places in 2000 in part for its architecture. The listing was for a 16-acre (6.5 ha) area roughly bounded by Spillway, Durden Creek, Tennessee Rd., and Dam Spillway, in Vicksburg, with five contributing buildings and three contributing structures.

== History ==
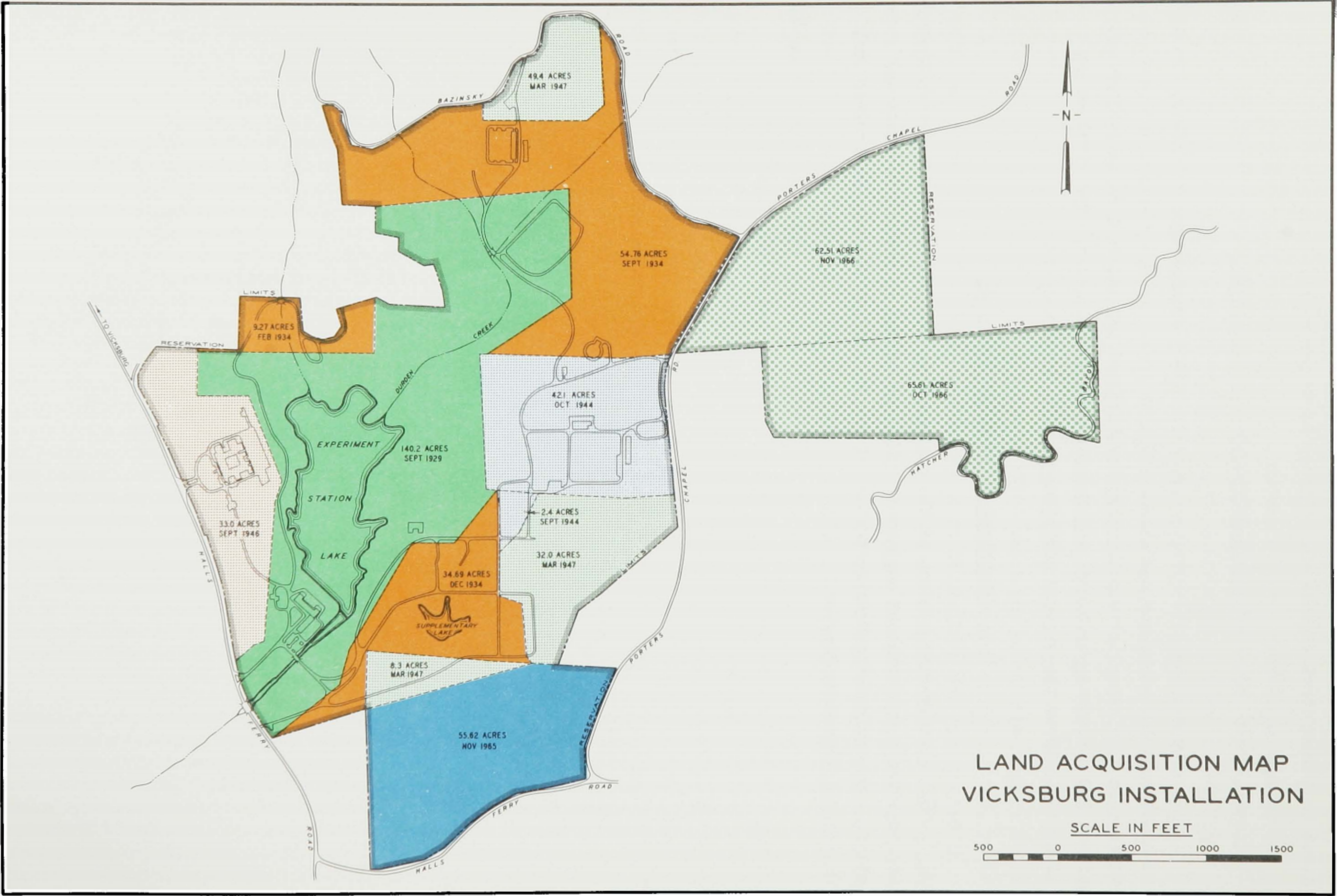
Land acquisition history and extent of WES.

The modern interest in scale modeling to study hydraulic engineering may be traced back to a demonstration model of flow over a weir in a glass-sided flume at the University of Michigan in the late 19th century. A visiting professor from the Technical College at Dresden, Hubert Engels, witnessed the model and upon his return, built a similar model in Dresden. Other hydraulic models were built at Karlsruhe and Delft (under the supervision of Prof. Jo Thijsse) soon afterwards. John Freeman is credited with reviving interest in hydraulic models in the United States, establishing a traveling fellowship in his name with the American Society of Civil Engineers in 1925 after repeated visits to the laboratory in Dresden.

The Great Mississippi Flood of 1927 prompted Congress to pass the Flood Control Act of 1928, authorizing numerous Corps of Engineers projects to control flooding along the Mississippi River. Meanwhile, Freeman campaigned for a national hydraulic laboratory, which resulted in a 1928 bill sponsored by Sen. Joseph Ransdell proposing construction of a laboratory in Washington, DC under the auspices of the Bureau of Standards after gaining the ear of then-Secretary of Commerce Herbert Hoover. After passing the Senate, Chief of Engineers General Edgar Jadwin testified against the proposed location before the House of Representatives, stating the laboratory should serve as a practical study of the Mississippi River, and as such, should be located on the Mississippi itself. As a result, the House deferred a decision on the national hydraulic laboratory until the following session. Jadwin's subordinates testified before the House in 1929 after visiting European hydraulic laboratories. Their testimony pointed out the differences in scale between North American rivers and European rivers would require larger models and more flexibility.

Memphis, Tennessee was proposed as the first site for a hydraulic laboratory in June 1929, but once the Mississippi River Commission headquarters were moved from St. Louis to Vicksburg in November, the hydraulic laboratory followed, with land purchased near Durden Creek on February 14, 1930.

WES's role as the first federal hydraulics research facility was to help the Mississippi River Commission develop and implement a flood control plan for the lower Mississippi Valley. The first river model, a model of the Illinois River built in the summer of 1930 to establish the backwater limit of the Mississippi, was dug in natural soil with a grapefruit knife.

== Historical organizational structure ==
In 1968, hydraulic studies at WES were divided into five divisions:

- Waterways, specializing in fluvial hydraulics using fixed-bed and movable-bed models
- Estuaries, specializing in tidal hydraulics using fixed-bed models
- Structures, specializing in dam appurtenances using scale models
- Water Waves, specializing in surface wave action using fixed-bed harbor models and testing flumes
- Hydraulic Analysis, specializing in the development and dissemination of hydraulic design data and procedures

== Mississippi Basin Model ==
The Mississippi Basin Model was the largest single project undertaken by WES. It was initiated by then-Chief of Engineers Eugene Reybold in 1943. Construction took place from 1947 through 1966, and its scope included most of the Mississippi River and its tributaries (excluding the upper reach and the lower reach below Baton Rouge). The partially-completed model was used to create flood control strategies during the April 1952 flood on the Missouri River.

== Current mission ==
Today there are over 1,200 employees, including several full-time members of the United States Armed Forces. Over 650 of these employees are engineers and scientists who work in such areas as hydraulics, oceanography, chemistry, electronics, physics, mathematics, soils, seismology, limnology, forestry, microbiology.

Research is carried out on WES in four separate, but closely interrelated laboratories: Coastal and Hydraulics Laboratory, Geotechnical and Structures Laboratory, Environmental Laboratory, and Information Technology Laboratory.

The history of engineering is the story of men and women in their attempts to understand, control, and accommodate their environment. In 1929 the U.S. Army Corps of Engineers established a small hydraulics laboratory in Vicksburg, Mississippi, in recognition of the increasingly vital role of scientific investigation in a laboratory setting as a necessary adjunct to the age-old practice of actual hands-on observation. Discoveries emanating from the laboratory, designated as the Waterways Experiment Station, paid immediate dividends and sparked a new confidence among the nation’s engineering community to make bold advancements and challenge or affirm long-standing doctrines. This initial success broadened the Waterways Experiment Station’s activities from mere hydraulic experiments for the Mississippi River to a Corps of Engineers-wide mission encompassing diverse fields of research.
