= Byer Covered Bridge =

- U.S. National Register of Historic Places
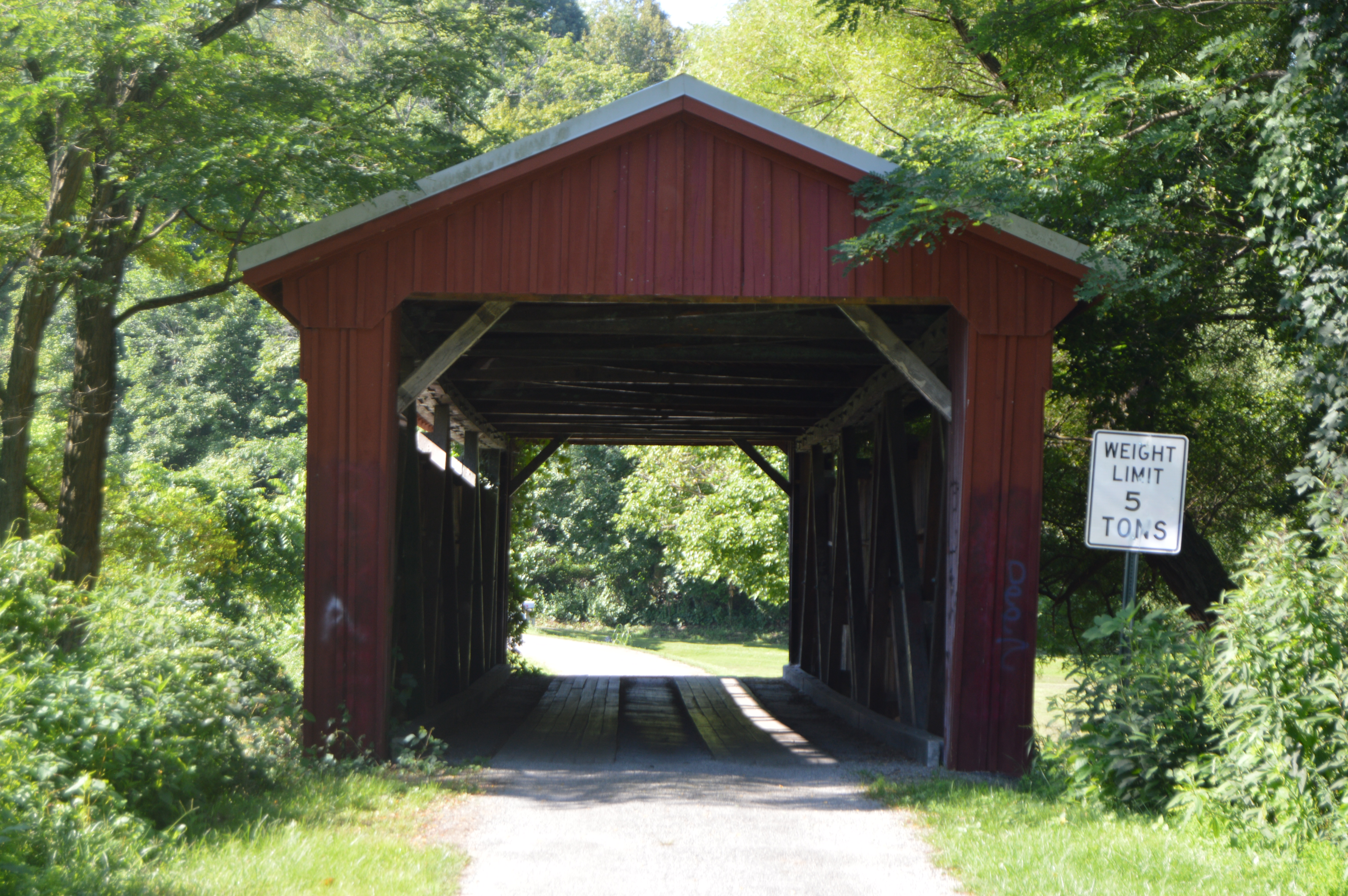
- Photo in 2015

- Location within Ohio
- Location: Byers Winter Road, Wellston Ohio, 45692, Byer, Ohio
- Coordinates: 39°10′46″N 82°37′52″W
- Area: less than one acre
- Built: c.1870
- Architectural style: Smith Truss
- NRHP reference No.: 75001441
- Added to NRHP: October 21, 1975

The Byer Covered Bridge is a covered bridge on State Route 31 in Byer, Ohio, United States. Built in around 1870, it was listed on the National Register of Historic Places in 1975.

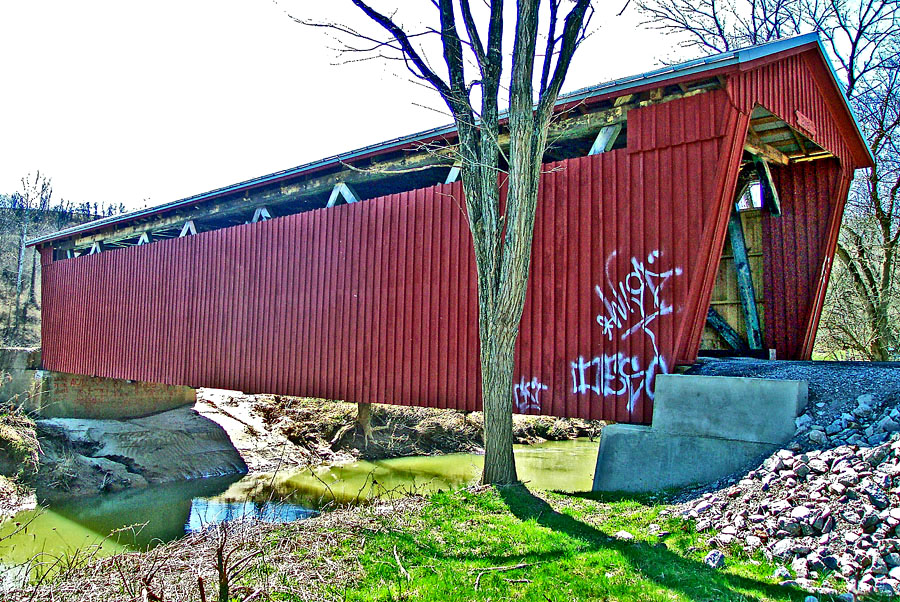
Bridge in 2000, over green water perhaps caused by coal mine runoff

It is a single-span wooden structure "lying on the banks of Pigeon Creek within the Wayne National Forest". It has a Smith truss span.
