= Buckeye, Yolo County, California =

Coordinates: 38.5867°N 121.9288°W

Buckeye was an unincorporated community in Yolo County, California, United States. It was located 6 miles (10 km) northeast of Winters, at an elevation of 118 feet (36 m).

== History ==
Buckeye was named for the native Buckeye (Aesculus californica) trees growing along Buckeye Creek. The town was in existence before April 11, 1855, when a church was then built in it. Reverend JN Pendegast, the pastor of the church in nearby Woodland, reported the news in 1858 that a church had indeed been built in Buckeye.

The local post office was established on May 17, 1855, and named after the town. JO Maxwell was the postmaster between 1857-1860 and transferred the post office to his store named Buckeye Store which he built in 1857.

In 1870 the area had a Masonic Hall, saloon, hotel, two stores, blacksmith, shoemaker's shop, boarding house, and the Buckeye School, which was located on County Roads 31 and 90A. It also still had a post office.

Buckeye thrived until the Vaca Valley and Clear Lake Railroad was built 2 miles (3.2 km) west of the town. The railroad tracks reached the new townsite of Winters in 1875 when that town was established. In 1877 the railroad progressed north from Winters to the new townsite of Madison. Buckeye residents subsequently moved to these new towns and the Buckeye post office closed. Residents even divided the church's building materials between the two cities they were migrating to. In 1879 the only thing left of the town was the school they had built and two farmers who had stayed behind.
