= Johnson Road Covered Bridge =

- U.S. National Register of Historic Places
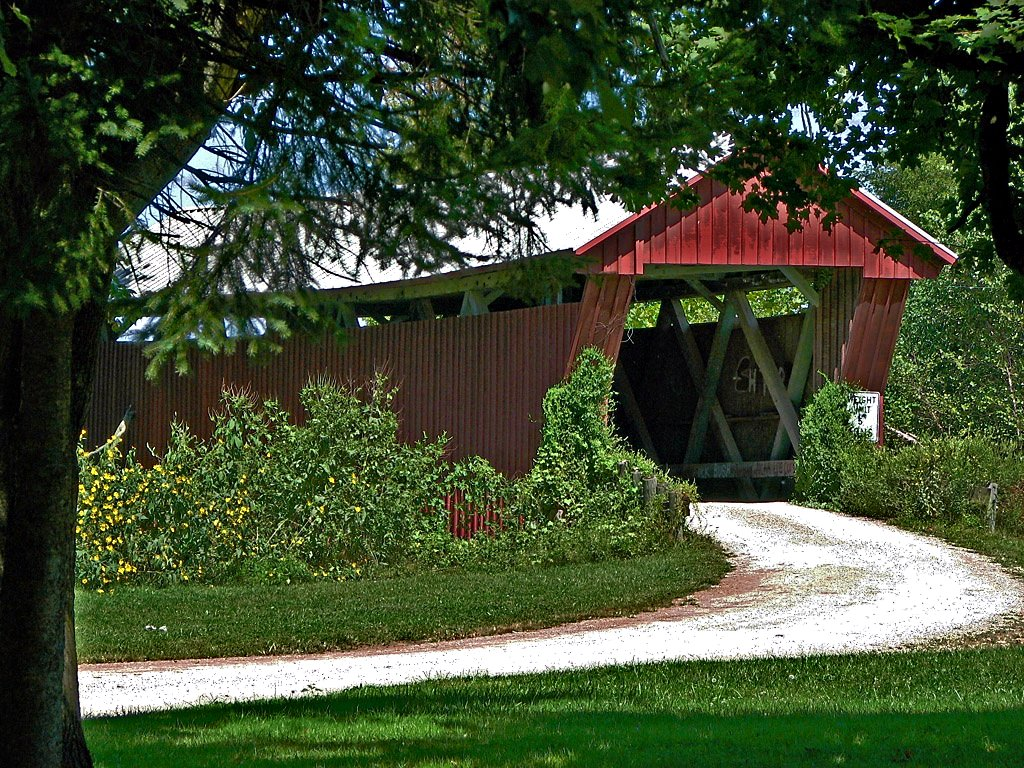

- Location within Ohio Location within the United States
- Nearest city: Petersburg, Ohio
- Coordinates: 38°57′31″N 82°47′16″W
- Area: less than one acre
- Built: c. 1870
- Built by: Robert W. Smith
- Architectural style: Wooden Smith truss
- NRHP reference No.: 84003749
- Added to NRHP: August 23, 1984

The Johnson Road Covered Bridge is a covered bridge located near Petersburg, Jackson County, Ohio, United States.

It was built around 1870 by Robert W. Smith, using his 1867 patent for the Smith truss design. While most all of the covered bridges built in Jackson County in the 19th century used this design, this one is the only known example still standing in the state, and was listed on the National Register of Historic Places in 1984.
