= Buckeye Furnace Covered Bridge =

- U.S. National Register of Historic Places
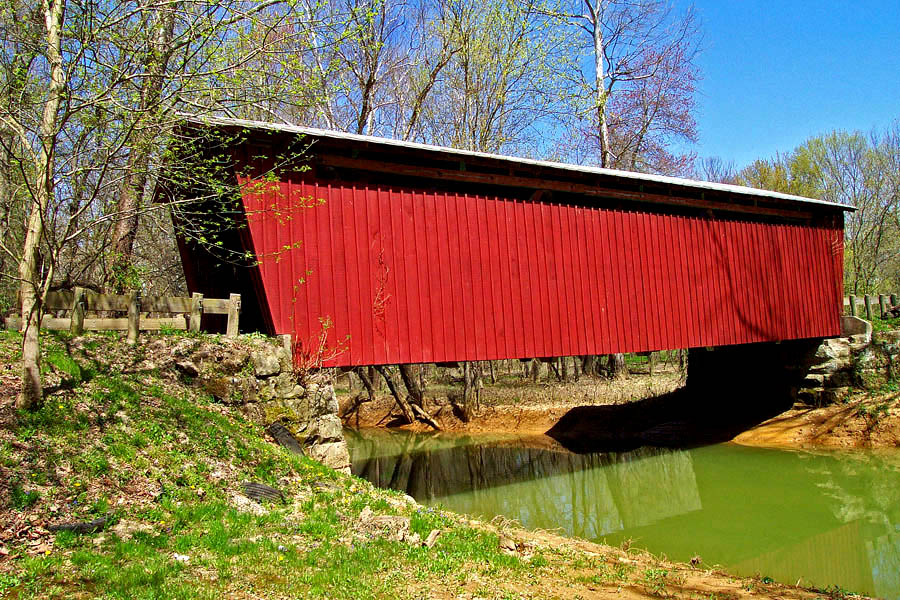

- Location within Ohio
- Nearest city: Buckeye, Ohio
- Coordinates: 39°03′16″N 82°27′31″W
- Area: less than one acre
- Built: 1872
- Architectural style: Smith Truss
- NRHP reference No.: 75001442
- Added to NRHP: February 24, 1975

The Buckeye Furnace Covered Bridge is a covered bridge located in Buckeye, Milton Township, Jackson County, Ohio. It was listed on the National Register of Historic Places in 1975.

Built in 1872, it is a Smith truss design bridge. It was named after the Buckeye Furnace, built 10 years prior, and provided access to the company town of Buckeye. The bridge continues to serve the region, even long after the furnace shut down in 1894 and the surrounding village disappeared.
