= Buckeye Township, Dickinson County, Kansas =

Buckeye Township
- Township
- Location in Dickinson County
- Coordinates: 39°00′10″N 097°12′11″W
- Country: United States
- State: Kansas
- County: Dickinson

Area
  - Total: 36.28 sq mi (93.96 km^{2})
  - Land: 36.22 sq mi (93.82 km^{2})
  - Water: 0.054 sq mi (0.14 km^{2}) 0.15%
- Elevation: 1,253 ft (382 m)

Population (2020)
  - Total: 449
  - Density: 12.4/sq mi (4.79/km^{2})
- GNIS feature ID: 0476477

Buckeye Township is a township in Dickinson County, Kansas, United States. As of the 2020 census, its population was 449.

Buckeye Township was organized in 1873.

== Geography ==
Buckeye Township covers an area of 36.28 square miles (94.0 km^{2}) and contains no incorporated settlements. According to the USGS, it contains one cemetery, Union.
