= Buckeye Furnace =

Historic blast furnace in Jackson County, Ohio, United States

- U.S. National Register of Historic Places
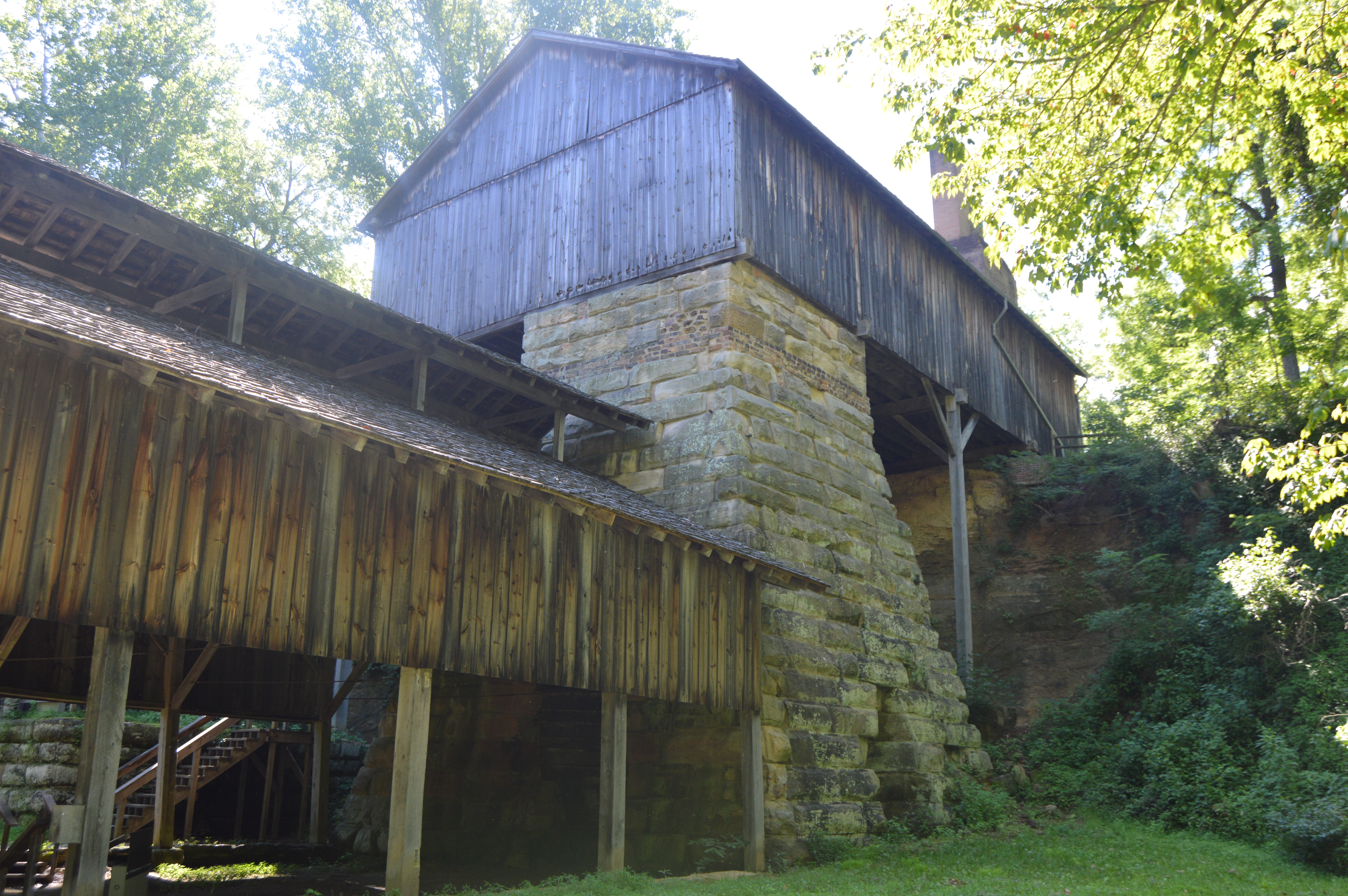

- Location within Ohio
- Location: Buckeye Furnace Road, Buckeye, Ohio
- Coordinates: 39°03′23″N 82°27′26″W
- Area: 77 acres (31 ha)
- Built: 1852
- NRHP reference No.: 70000503
- Added to NRHP: November 10, 1970

Buckeye Furnace is a historic iron furnace in rural Jackson County, Ohio, United States. The 270-acre (110 ha) furnace produced charcoal iron and operated from 1852 to 1894. Like most blast furnaces of the time, it consists of a lower level for the furnace itself and an upper level for charcoal storage. The nearby community of Buckeye, Ohio, served as a company town for furnace workers.

The furnace was part of the Hanging Rock Iron Region, an area of southern Ohio and northeast Kentucky which became known for iron production in the 19th century. As the region contained iron ore, limestone deposits, and wood for making charcoal, it was ideal for iron production. During the Civil War, the region made Ohio a top iron-producing state for the Union.

The Ohio Historical Society purchased the furnace in 1935. In the 1960s, it began reconstructing the site's original buildings based on interviews with surviving furnace workers. The furnace was added to the National Register of Historic Places in 1970. It is currently a state historic site and open to the public for tours.
