= Engineer Research and Development Center =

U.S. Army Corps of Engineers research and development organization

Coordinates: 32°17′59″N 90°51′51″W

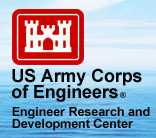
- Established: October 1999
- Research type: Research in support of the Army Corps of Engineers mission
- Director: Elizabeth Fleming
- Location: 3909 Halls Ferry Road, Vicksburg, Mississippi, 39180-6199, U.S.A.
- Website: www.erdc.usace.army.mil

The Engineer Research and Development Center (ERDC) is a US Army Corps of Engineers (USACE) research and laboratory organization.

The main facility is located in Vicksburg, Mississippi, on the site of an antecedent organization, the Waterways Experiment Station. It also has facilities in Hanover, New Hampshire, Champaign, Illinois, and Fort Belvoir, Virginia.

== History ==
In October 1999, the Corps of Engineers established a system of laboratories, called the Engineer Research and Development Center (ERDC). The ERDC was a consolidation of seven, pre-existing laboratories: the Coastal and Hydraulics, Environmental, Geotechnical and Structures, and Information Technology Laboratories in Vicksburg, Mississippi; the Construction Engineering Research Laboratory in Champaign, Illinois; the Cold Regions Research and Engineering Laboratory in Hanover, New Hampshire; and the Topographic Engineering Center in Fort Belvoir, Virginia.

ERDC won the Army Research Laboratory of the Year award five times in its first eight years.

The Topographic Engineering Center became the Army Geospatial Center (AGC) and started reporting directly to the Corps of Engineers as of 2009. As of 2014, ERDC still maintained a Geospatial Research Laboratory (GRL) collocated in Alexandria with AGC.

== List of laboratories ==
- Coastal and Hydraulics Laboratory, Vicksburg, Mississippi
- Environmental Laboratory, Vicksburg, Mississippi
- Geotechnical and Structures Laboratory, Vicksburg, Mississippi
- Information Technology Laboratory, Vicksburg, Mississippi
- Cold Regions Research and Engineering Laboratory, Hanover, New Hampshire
- Construction Engineering Research Laboratory, Champaign, Illinois
- Geospatial Research Laboratory, co-located with the Army Geospatial Center at Fort Belvoir, Virginia
