= Army Geospatial Center =

U.S. Army Corps of Engineers center specializing in geospatial information

- Established: 2009
- Research type: Develop geospatial capabilities for the Army and the Department of Defense
- Director: David R. Hibner
- Location: 7701 Telegraph Road, Alexandria, Virginia, 22315-3864, U.S.A.
- Website: www.agc.army.mil

The Army Geospatial Center (AGC) (formerly Topographic Engineering Center (TEC), part of the ERDC) is a Major Subordinate Command of the United States Army Corps of Engineers. It is located in Alexandria, Virginia, within the Humphreys Engineering Center adjacent to the Fort Belvoir military reservation.

The AGC reportedly coordinates, integrates, and synchronizes geospatial information and standards across the Army, develops and fields geospatial enterprise-enabled systems and capabilities to the Army and the Department of Defense, and provides direct geospatial support and products to Warfighters. Its Geospatial Research and Engineering Division, an Engineer Research and Development Center asset, conducts research and development into geospatial data collection, processing, exploitation, and dissemination in support of both civilian missions and missions of U.S. ground forces.

== Subject matter expertise ==
AGC reportedly employs a workforce of more than 400, which includes Department of Defense civilians, contractors and military personnel. They support four program areas in support of the AGC mission:

- Providing geospatial information products and services to US Army users.
- Developing and fielding geospatial intelligence systems.
- Synchronization of geospatial technology programs and policies for weapons system acquisition.
- Research and development of geospatial technologies to characterize both physical and cultural environments encountered in military operations.

The AGC Director serves as the Geospatial Information Officer of the US Army.

=== Terrain data ===
AGC's primary area of expertise is in acquiring and depicting terrain data. It has developed products to rapidly characterize complex and urban terrain that include the use of the Rapid Terrain Visualization (RTV) and Urban Recon (UR) Advanced Concept Technology Demonstrations (ACTDs). These are embodied in the BuckEye program, bringing the collection of high resolution color imagery and coincidentally collected Light Detection and Ranging (LIDAR) data to the battlefield, enabling the rapid characterization of complex and urban terrain at a human scale. Typically, the BuckEye program collects 1m post spacing terrain data (derived from LIDAR) coincidentally collected with 10 cm color imagery. BuckEye data products are reportedly unclassified and for sharing with US military allies.

BuckEye was first deployed operationally in Iraq in 2004, under Operation Iraqi Freedom, on rotary-wing aircraft. BuckEye was subsequently flown over all of Iraq’s urban areas and transportation corridors, constituting some 11% of the Iraqi landmass, using fixed-wing aircraft. BuckEye was first deployed operationally in Afghanistan in 2006, under Operation Enduring Freedom, on rotary-wing aircraft. By 2008, BuckEye was being consistently flown fixed-wing over Afghanistan. With the surge in forces beginning in 2009, multiple BuckEye fixed-wing and unmanned aircraft systems (UAS) platforms have been deployed in Afghanistan to gather human-scale terrain data for use by Coalition commanders and host nation forces. The BuckEye program was recognized as a 2006 Army "Greatest Invention of the Year."

=== Other areas of expertise ===
The other reported types of products and services that AGC provides include:

- Terrain – AGC is involved in design, development and deployment of systems for terrain reasoning and management; terrain data collections (human, urban and production), analysis, distribution of 2D and 3D terrain visualization research, services, global positioning and portable terrain (system and services).
- Imagery – AGC employs technologies for the collection, use, storage, and distribution of aerial and satellite imagery and sensor data from electro-optical, hyperspectral, LIDAR, and other geo-sensors from the open and unclassified to the highly secured environments; hosting the BuckEye collection platform; and research into multi-sensor environments and analysis.
- Hydrology – AGC has developed products that incorporate hydrological algorithms and decision aids; systems for hydro reasoning and management; ground, surface, and man-made hydrological data capture, production, management, analysis, and distribution; hydrological model visualization; electronic navigation; and water management systems.
- Acquisition Support – AGC coordinates the design, development, fielding, and home station support of terrain, hydrological, navigational, imagery, and command & control systems.
- Enterprise Development – AGC is active in the Army´s Geospatial Enterprise, the Army Geospatial Governance Board, standards and requirements for systems using geospatial information, and geospatial data formats and tools.
- Civil Works – AGC develops products for the management of civil works projects, dam safety management, inland waterways navigation, and civilian disaster relief efforts. Of note is its system of inland electronic navigational charts for real-time display of vessel positions relative to waterway features and its system of map overlays that provides targeted, detailed information about inland waterways to the dredging industry, environmental planners, hydraulic engineers and others.

== Publications ==
AGC reports originating a series of Army Engineer Manuals and technical publications on the following topics. The engineer manuals cover the following: photogrammetric mapping, NAVSTAR GPS positioning surveying, deformation monitoring and control surveying, topographic surveying, and hydrographic surveying. Other technical publications cover geographic profiling, terrain gap identification and analysis, coastal boundary and merging bathymetry, comparison of digital flood insurance rate maps to interferometric synthetic aperture radar (IFSAR) products, and the effect of El Niño on Army tactical decision aids, among other topics.

== See also ==
- Corps of Topographical Engineers, a precursor Army agency in the 1800s that was merged with the Corps of Engineers in 1863
