= Wellston, Ohio =

- City
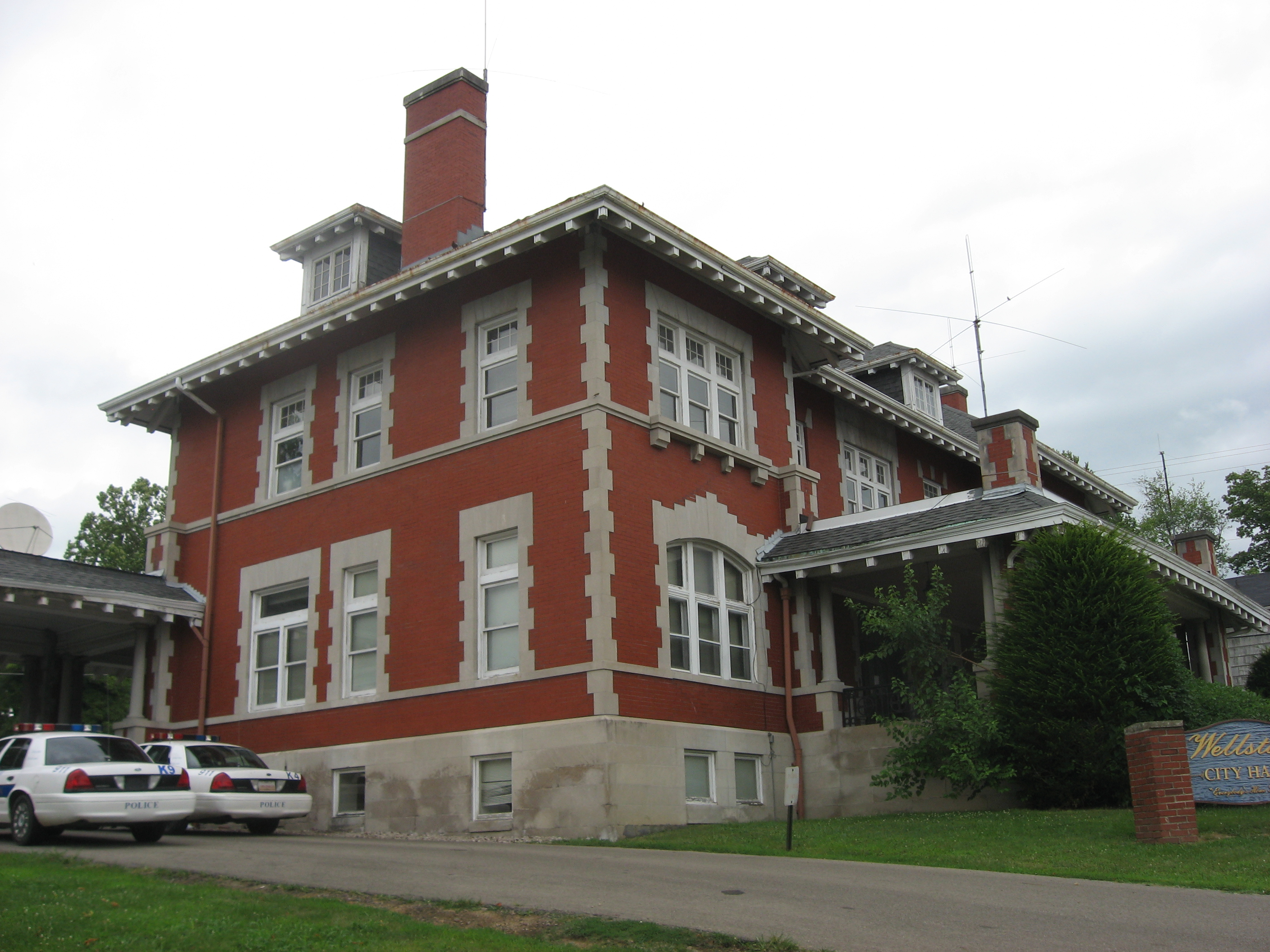
- The Morgan Mansion

- Seal
- Motto: "Everyone's Hometown Since 1873".
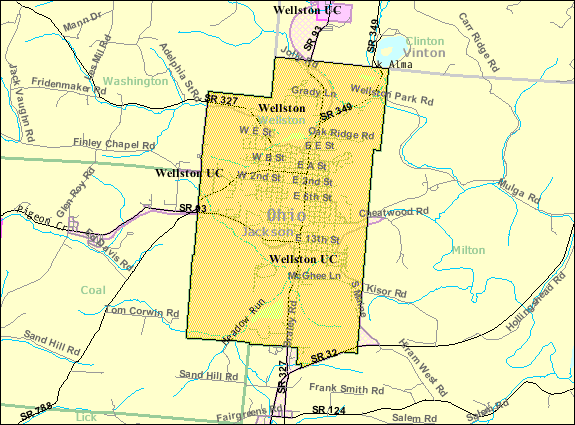
- Detailed map of Wellston

- Location within Ohio Location within the United States
- Coordinates: 39°07′31″N 82°32′07″W
- Country: United States
- State: Ohio
- County: Jackson

Area
  - Total: 7.05 sq mi (18.26 km^{2})
  - Land: 6.97 sq mi (18.04 km^{2})
  - Water: 0.085 sq mi (0.22 km^{2})
- Elevation: 719 ft (219 m)

Population (2020)
  - Total: 5,412
  - Estimate (2025): 5,488
  - Density: 776.8/sq mi (299.92/km^{2})
- Time zone: UTC-5 (Eastern (EST))
  - Summer (DST): UTC-4 (EDT)
- ZIP code: 45692
- Area code: 740
- FIPS code: 39-82712
- GNIS feature ID: 1086375
- Website: cityofwellston.org

Wellston is a city in Jackson County, Ohio, United States, in the southeastern part of the state. The population was 5,412 at the 2020 census.

== History ==
Wellston was laid out and founded in 1873 on land owned by Harvey Wells. Wells constructed a blast furnace in 1874, and the town was incorporated in 1876. Wellston flourished for several years on the furnace and local mining industry, but most of the resources have now been depleted.

== Geography ==
According to the United States Census Bureau, the city has a total area of 7.05 square miles (18.26 km^{2}), of which 6.97 square miles (18.05 km^{2}) is land and 0.08 square miles (0.21 km^{2}) is water.

== Demographics ==
Historical population
Census	Pop.	Note	%±
1880	952		—
1890	4,377		359.8%
1900	8,045		83.8%
1910	6,875		−14.5%
1920	6,687		−2.7%
1930	5,319		−20.5%
1940	5,537		4.1%
1950	5,691		2.8%
1960	5,728		0.7%
1970	5,410		−5.6%
1980	6,016		11.2%
1990	6,049		0.5%
2000	6,078		0.5%
2010	5,663		−6.8%
2020	5,412		−4.4%
2025 (est.)	5,488		1.4%

=== 2020 census ===
As of the 2020 census, Wellston had a population of 5,412. The median age was 40.1 years. 24.1% of residents were under the age of 18 and 19.4% of residents were 65 years of age or older. For every 100 females there were 91.8 males, and for every 100 females age 18 and over there were 87.3 males age 18 and over.

86.8% of residents lived in urban areas, while 13.2% lived in rural areas.

There were 2,188 households in Wellston, of which 32.1% had children under the age of 18 living in them. Of all households, 40.4% were married-couple households, 16.8% were households with a male householder and no spouse or partner present, and 33.0% were households with a female householder and no spouse or partner present. About 29.6% of all households were made up of individuals and 14.7% had someone living alone who was 65 years of age or older.

There were 2,437 housing units, of which 10.2% were vacant. The homeowner vacancy rate was 1.8% and the rental vacancy rate was 6.9%.

Racial composition as of the 2020 census
Race	Number	Percent
White	5,099	94.2%
Black or African American	8	0.1%
American Indian and Alaska Native	9	0.2%
Asian	14	0.3%
Native Hawaiian and Other Pacific Islander	0	0.0%
Some other race	14	0.3%
Two or more races	268	5.0%
Hispanic or Latino (of any race)	70	1.3%

=== 2010 census ===
As of the census of 2010, there were 5,663 people, 2,250 households, and 1,459 families living in the city. The population density was 812.5 inhabitants per square mile (313.7/km^{2}). There were 2,535 housing units at an average density of 363.7 per square mile (140.4/km^{2}). The racial makeup of the city was 97.7% White, 0.2% African American, 0.4% Native American, 0.2% Asian, 0.1% from other races, and 1.3% from two or more races. Hispanic or Latino of any race were 0.7% of the population.

There were 2,250 households, of which 35.7% had children under the age of 18 living with them, 41.9% were married couples living together, 16.3% had a female householder with no husband present, 6.6% had a male householder with no wife present, and 35.2% were non-families. 29.8% of all households were made up of individuals, and 13.3% had someone living alone who was 65 years of age or older. The average household size was 2.47 and the average family size was 3.03.

The median age in the city was 36.5 years. 25.6% of residents were under the age of 18; 9.4% were between the ages of 18 and 24; 24.8% were from 25 to 44; 25.3% were from 45 to 64; and 14.8% were 65 years of age or older. The gender makeup of the city was 46.8% male and 53.2% female.

=== 2000 census ===
As of the census of 2000, there were 6,078 people, 2,359 households, and 1,644 families living in the city. The population density was 872.4 inhabitants per square mile (336.8/km^{2}). There were 2,615 housing units at an average density of 375.3 per square mile (144.9/km^{2}). The racial makeup of the city was 98.08% White, 0.36% African American, 0.28% Native American, 0.16% Asian, 0.21% from other races, and 0.90% from two or more races. Hispanic or Latino of any race were 0.61% of the population.

There were 2,359 households, out of which 34.6% had children under the age of 18 living with them, 48.6% were married couples living together, 15.8% had a female householder with no husband present, and 30.3% were non-families. 26.9% of all households were made up of individuals, and 13.2% had someone living alone who was 65 years of age or older. The average household size was 2.52 and the average family size was 3.02.

In the city the population was spread out, with 26.9% under the age of 18, 9.5% from 18 to 24, 26.8% from 25 to 44, 21.3% from 45 to 64, and 15.5% who were 65 years of age or older. The median age was 36 years. For every 100 females, there were 88.6 males. For every 100 females age 18 and over, there were 83.8 males.

The median income for a household in the city was $30,021, and the median income for a family was $34,488. Males had a median income of $28,514 versus $20,967 for females. The per capita income for the city was $13,476. About 15.8% of families and 18.8% of the population were below the poverty line, including 24.7% of those under age 18 and 14.6% of those age 65 or over.

== Government ==
In October 2009, the Ohio state government declared the City of Wellston to be in a state of fiscal emergency "as defined by Section 118.03(A)(6) and 118.03(B) of the Ohio Revised Code" on the basis of a "treasury deficiency".

== Economy ==
General Mills is Wellston's largest source of employment, with roughly 900 employees. There are a number of small businesses in Wellston, alongside a few chain restaurants and stores.

In 1923, Gem Beverages opened in Wellston, bottling and distributing soda. Despite no longer bottling soda, the brand remains locally famous and distributes to eight nearby counties. The company's citrus soda, Ski, has earned the nickname, "Wellston Water," due to its popularity amongst the community.

== Education ==
The local school district, Wellston City Schools, operates the following schools:

- Bundy Elementary School
- Wellston High School
- Wellston Intermediate School
- Wellston Middle School

Private School

- Formerly St. Peter and St. Paul Catholic School that closed in May of 2023.

Wellston is served by the Sylvester Memorial Public Library. In 2005, the library loaned more than 70,000 items to its 10,000 cardholders, and it had total holdings of over 31,000 volumes with over 90 periodical subscriptions.

== Notable people ==
- Homer E. Abele (1916–2000), Ohio state representative
- Hezekiah S. Bundy (1817–1895), Ohio state representative and senator
- John Carey (born 1959), Ohio state representative and senator
- Elle King (born 1989), singer and songwriter
- Timothy S. Hogan (1864–1925), Ohio Attorney General
- Timothy S. Hogan (1909–1989), U.S. district judge
- Jeff Montgomery (born 1962), Major League Baseball player
- John Sylvester (1904–1990), U.S. Navy vice admiral
