= KJRO =

KJRO may refer to:

- KJRO, the ICAO airport code for James A. Rhodes Airport, Jackson County, Ohio, United States
- KJRO, the Kolkata Metro station code for Jessore Road metro station, West Bengal, India
