= Jackson, Ohio =

- City
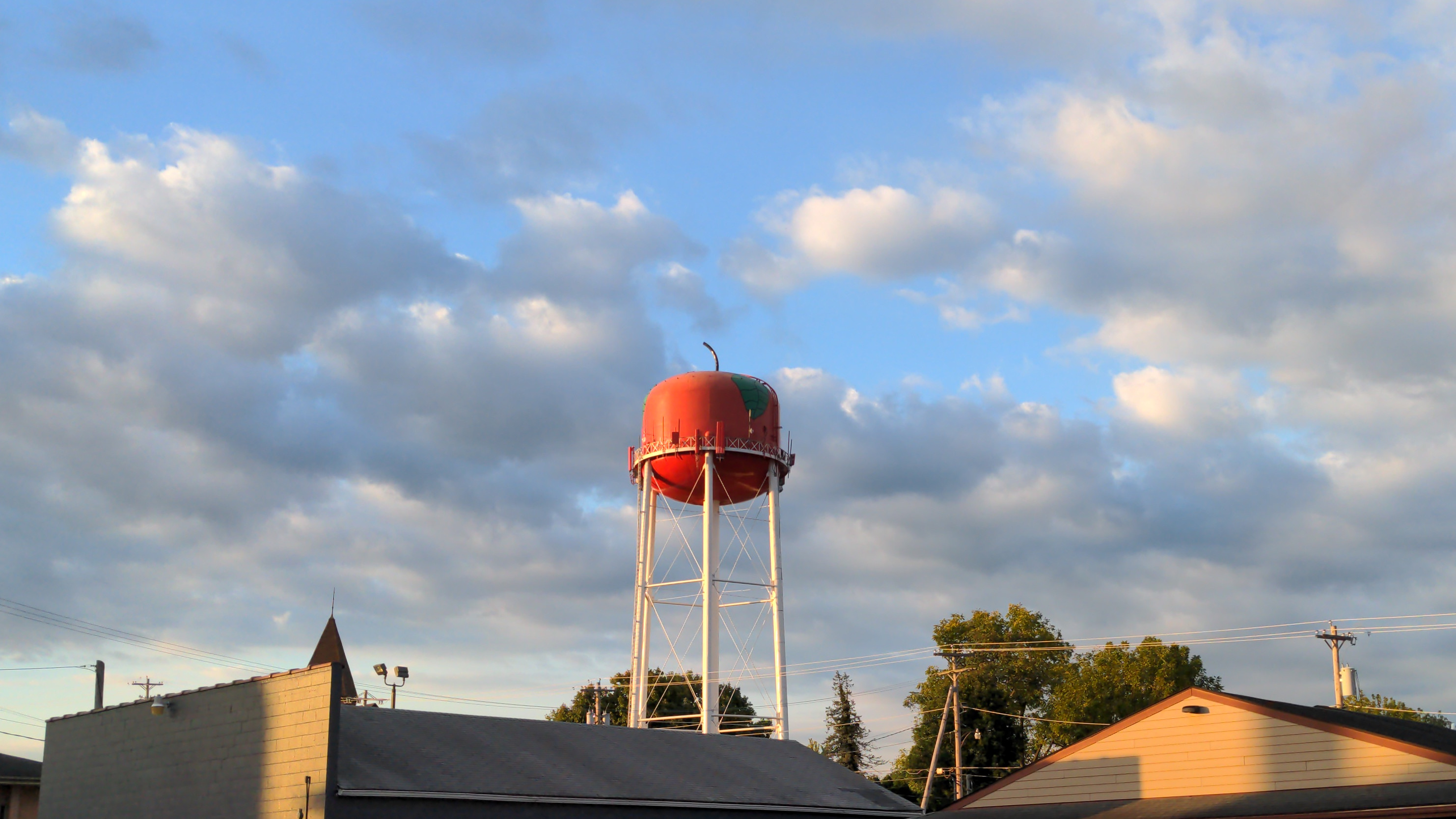
- The Apple Water Tower, a landmark of Jackson
- Motto: "We make things happen"
- Interactive map of Jackson, Ohio
- Location within Ohio Location within the United States
- Coordinates: 39°02′25″N 82°37′45″W
- Country: United States
- State: Ohio
- County: Jackson

Area
  - Total: 9.31 sq mi (24.12 km^{2})
  - Land: 9.05 sq mi (23.44 km^{2})
  - Water: 0.26 sq mi (0.68 km^{2})
- Elevation: 673 ft (205 m)

Population (2020)
  - Total: 6,252
  - Estimate (2025): 6,233
  - Density: 690.7/sq mi (266.69/km^{2})
- Time zone: UTC-5 (Eastern (EST))
  - Summer (DST): UTC-4 (EDT)
- ZIP code: 45640
- Area code: 740
- FIPS code: 39-37842
- GNIS feature ID: 2395447
- Website: https://www.jacksonohio.us/

Jackson is a city in and the county seat of Jackson County, Ohio, United States about 27 miles (43 km) southeast of Chillicothe. Its population was 6,252 at the 2020 census.

== History ==
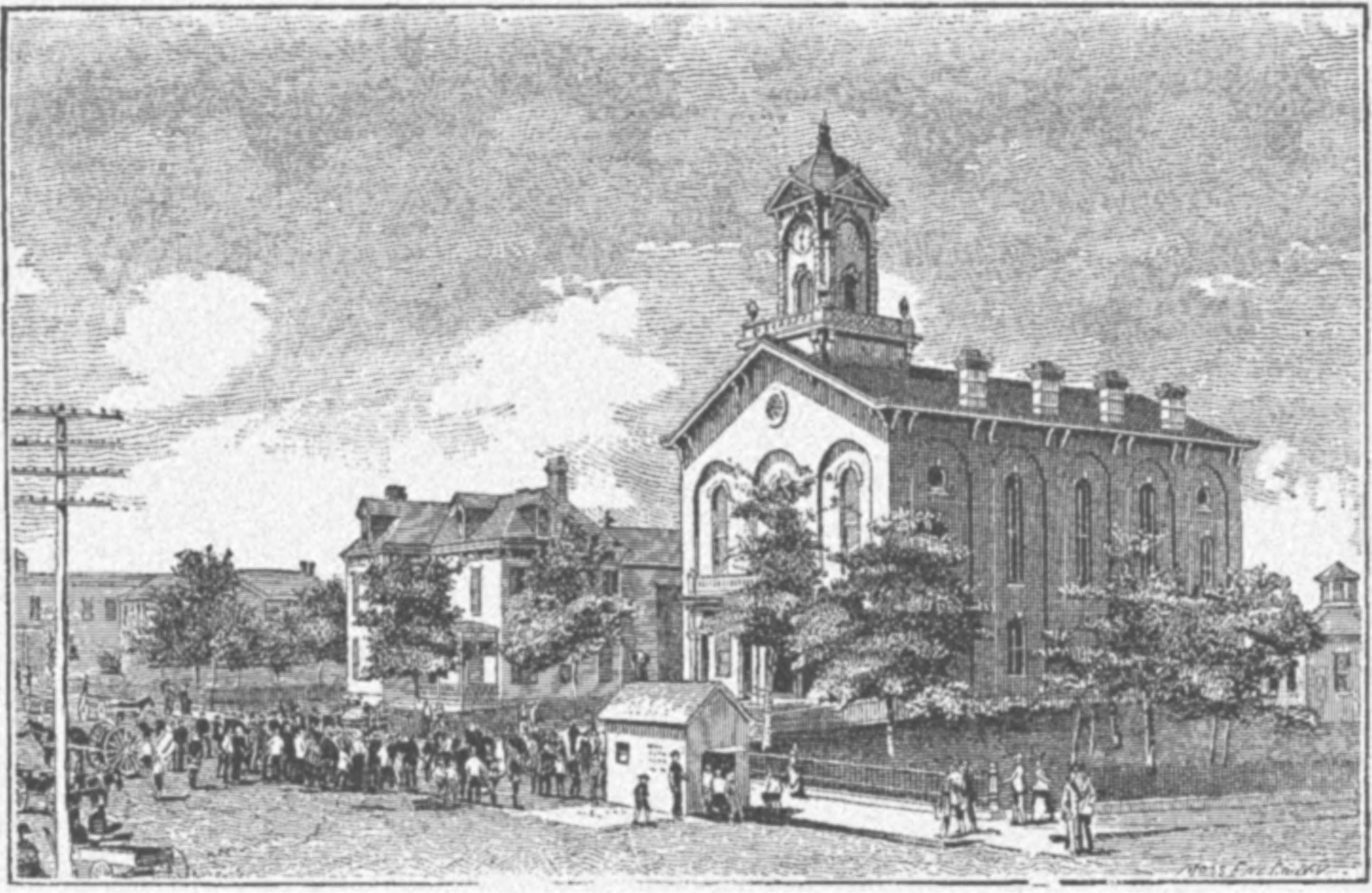
Late 19th century

Established in 1817, residents named the town after Andrew Jackson, a hero of the War of 1812, and an eventual president of the United States. The community grew slowly, having only 297 inhabitants in 1840. In 1846, Jackson had four churches, about seven stores, and a single newspaper office. Over the next 40 years, the town grew quickly, attaining a population of 3,021 people in 1880. By 1880, two railroad lines passed through the community, helping to spur economic and population growth. In 1886, two newspaper offices, eight churches, and two banks existed in Jackson. The largest businesses in the town were the Star Furnace Company and the Globe Iron Company, with 30 employees apiece. Both firms used local coal and iron ore deposits to make iron products.

Jackson continued to grow during the 20th century; it was the county's largest community in 2000, with a population of 6,184 people. This number comprised roughly 20% of the county's entire population. Today, many locals find employment in a General Mills plant in nearby Wellston, Ohio, which employs more than 1000 people.

== Geography ==
According to the United States Census Bureau, the city has a total area of 8.49 square miles (21.99 km^{2}), of which 0.26 sq mi (0.67 km^{2}) is covered by water.

=== Public lands ===
Parks include Eddie Jones Park, Manpower Park, and McKinley Park. The city operates the Fairmount Cemetery. The Lillian E. Jones museum is housed in a house built in 1869. Hammertown Lake, the city reservoir, has picnic areas and fishing.

=== Climate ===
Climate data for Jackson 3 NW, Ohio (1991–2020 normals, extremes 1914–present)
Month	Jan	Feb	Mar	Apr	May	Jun	Jul	Aug	Sep	Oct	Nov	Dec	Year
Record high °F (°C)	78 (26)	78 (26)	88 (31)	93 (34)	97 (36)	101 (38)	104 (40)	103 (39)	102 (39)	93 (34)	83 (28)	79 (26)	104 (40)
Mean daily maximum °F (°C)	37.0 (2.8)	40.8 (4.9)	50.9 (10.5)	64.4 (18.0)	71.8 (22.1)	78.7 (25.9)	81.7 (27.6)	80.5 (26.9)	74.7 (23.7)	63.4 (17.4)	51.7 (10.9)	41.3 (5.2)	61.4 (16.3)
Daily mean °F (°C)	28.9 (−1.7)	31.8 (−0.1)	40.6 (4.8)	52.2 (11.2)	60.7 (15.9)	68.3 (20.2)	71.9 (22.2)	70.6 (21.4)	64.3 (17.9)	52.8 (11.6)	42.1 (5.6)	33.6 (0.9)	51.5 (10.8)
Mean daily minimum °F (°C)	20.8 (−6.2)	22.8 (−5.1)	30.4 (−0.9)	40.1 (4.5)	49.6 (9.8)	58.0 (14.4)	62.2 (16.8)	60.8 (16.0)	53.8 (12.1)	42.2 (5.7)	32.4 (0.2)	26.0 (−3.3)	41.6 (5.3)
Record low °F (°C)	−31 (−35)	−20 (−29)	−15 (−26)	10 (−12)	17 (−8)	31 (−1)	40 (4)	34 (1)	27 (−3)	11 (−12)	−11 (−24)	−20 (−29)	−31 (−35)
Average precipitation inches (mm)	3.26 (83)	3.37 (86)	4.15 (105)	4.07 (103)	4.42 (112)	4.53 (115)	4.65 (118)	3.59 (91)	3.48 (88)	2.99 (76)	2.94 (75)	3.61 (92)	45.06 (1,145)
Average snowfall inches (cm)	7.0 (18)	5.9 (15)	3.0 (7.6)	0.2 (0.51)	0.0 (0.0)	0.0 (0.0)	0.0 (0.0)	0.0 (0.0)	0.0 (0.0)	0.1 (0.25)	0.9 (2.3)	3.6 (9.1)	20.7 (53)
Average precipitation days (≥ 0.01 in)	12.3	12.1	11.7	11.8	12.7	11.8	11.2	9.7	8.6	9.8	9.7	12.4	133.8
Average snowy days (≥ 0.1 in)	5.2	4.4	1.5	0.3	0.0	0.0	0.0	0.0	0.0	0.1	0.8	3.6	15.9
Source: NOAA

== Demographics ==
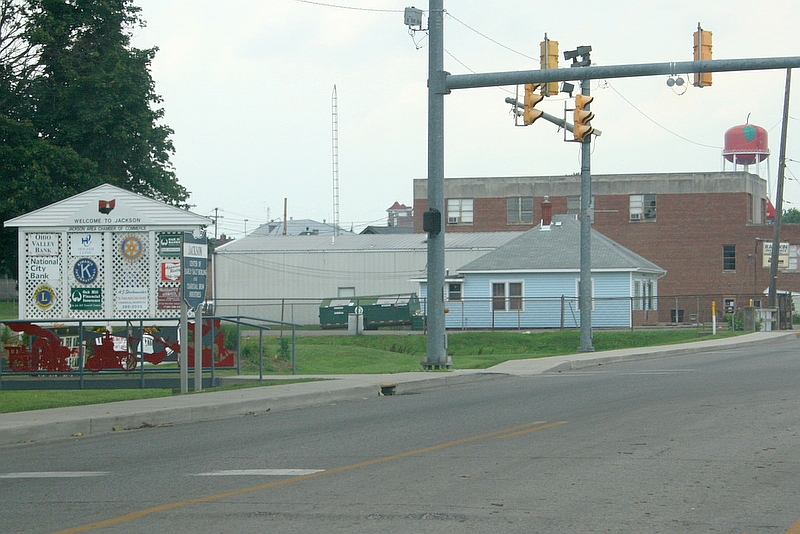
Jackson's welcome sign, seen driving northbound on State Route 93 in 2007

Jackson has the eighth-largest population of people of Welsh descent in the United States, and fourth-largest in Ohio. The Welsh-American Heritage Museum in Oak Hill describes the experience of Welsh immigration to this area and their chief occupations in farming, making iron, and manufacturing clay.

Historical population
Census	Pop.	Note	%±
1830	136		—
1840	297		118.4%
1850	480		61.6%
1860	1,067		122.3%
1870	2,016		88.9%
1880	3,021		49.9%
1890	4,320		43.0%
1900	4,672		8.1%
1910	5,468		17.0%
1920	5,842		6.8%
1930	5,922		1.4%
1940	6,295		6.3%
1950	6,504		3.3%
1960	6,980		7.3%
1970	6,843		−2.0%
1980	6,675		−2.5%
1990	6,144		−8.0%
2000	6,184		0.7%
2010	6,397		3.4%
2020	6,252		−2.3%
2025 (est.)	6,233		−0.3%

=== 2020 census ===
As of the 2020 census, Jackson had a population of 6,252, and the median age was 38.6 years; 23.5% of residents were under 18 and 18.3% were 65 or older. For every 100 females there were 91.3 males and for every 100 females age 18 and over there were 85.3 males.

According to the 2020 census, 95.9% of residents lived in urban areas and 4.1% lived in rural areas.

There were 2,673 households in Jackson, of which 28.7% had children under 18 living with them. Of all households, 36.2% were married-couple households, 18.8% were households with a male householder and no spouse or partner present, and 36.4% were households with a female householder and no spouse or partner present. About 35.3% of all households were made up of individuals and 17.4% had someone living alone who was 65 or older.

There were 3,001 housing units, of which 10.9% were vacant. The homeowner vacancy rate was 3.6% and the rental vacancy rate was 8.5%.

Racial composition as of the 2020 census
Race	Number	Percent
White	5,820	93.1%
Black or African American	47	0.8%
American Indian and Alaska Native	21	0.3%
Asian	54	0.9%
Native Hawaiian and Other Pacific Islander	0	0.0%
Some other race	37	0.6%
Two or more races	273	4.4%
Hispanic or Latino (of any race)	96	1.5%

=== 2010 census ===
As of the 2010 census, 6,397 people, 2,734 households, and 1,698 families were living in the city. The population density was 777.3 inhabitants per square mile (300.1/km^{2}). The 3,019 housing units had an average density of 366.8 per square mile (141.6/km^{2}). The racial makeup of the city was 96.4% White, 0.7% African American, 0.3% Native American, 0.4% Asian, 0.4% from other races, and 1.7% from two or more races. Hispanics or Latinos of any race were 1.5% of the population.

Of the 2,734 households, 32.3% had children under 18 living with them, 40.5% were married couples living together, 17.2% had a female householder with no husband present, 4.4% had a male householder with no wife present, and 37.9% were not families. About 33.5% of all households were made up of individuals, and 14.2% had someone living alone who was 65 or older. The average household size was 2.32 and the average family size was 2.94.

The median age in the city was 38.1 years. The age distribution was 23.8% under 18, 9.6% from 18 to 24, 26% from 25 to 44, 26% from 45 to 64, and 14.7% were 65 or older. The gender makeup of the city was 46.5% male and 53.5% female.

=== 2000 census ===
As of the 2000 census, 6,184 people, 2,667 households, and 1,712 families resided in the city. The population density was 823.4 inhabitants per square mile (317.9/km^{2}). The 2,905 housing units had an average density of 386.8 per square mile (149.3/km^{2}). The racial makeup of the city was 98.19% White, 0.44% African American, 0.19% Native American, 0.26% Asian, 0.03% Pacific Islander, 0.29% from other races, and 0.60% from two or more races. Hispanics or Latinos of any race were 0.86% of the population.

Of the 2,667 households, 30.9% had children under living with them, 45.8% were married couples living together, 14.2% had a female householder with no husband present, and 35.8% were not families. About 32.4% of all households were made up of individuals, and 14.6% had someone living alone who was 65 or older. The average household size was 2.32 and the average family size was 2.91.

In the city, the age distribution was 24.7% under 18, 8.9% from 18 to 24, 27.8% from 25 to 44, 22.2% from 45 to 64, and 16.3% who were 65 or older. The median age was 38 years. For every 100 females, there were 85.1 males. For every 100 females 18 and over, there were 80.3 males.

The median income for a household in the city was $26,728, and for a family was $33,456. Males had a median income of $31,131 versus $21,612 for females. The per capita income for the city was $14,855. About 14.6% of families and 18.7% of the population were below the poverty line, including 23.6% of those under 18 and 18.4% of those 65 or over.

== Education ==
Jackson City Schools operates three elementary schools, one middle school, and Jackson High School.

The city has Jackson City Library, a public lending library.

== Infrastructure ==
=== Transportation ===
James A. Rhodes Airport is located five nautical miles (5.8 mi; 9.3 km) southeast of Jackson's central business district.

== Notable people ==
- Stan Arthur, vice chief of naval operations, officer in U.S Navy
- Fletcher Benton, sculptor and painter
- Frank Crumit, singer, songwriter, half of the "Swinging Sweethearts"
- Homer Marshman, first owner of the NFL's Rams franchise
- Allen McKenzie, musician for FireHouse
- William Pickrel, American attorney and 40th and 43rd lieutenant governor of Ohio
- John Wesley Powell, explorer of the Grand Canyon and other western lands
- Nicole Riegel, writer and director of the 2020 film Holler, director of 2024's film Dandelion

== See also ==
- Jackson County Apple Festival
