= Unabomber (film) =

2026 film by Janus Metz Pedersen

- Release poster
- Directed by: Janus Metz Pedersen
- Written by: Sam Chalsen; Nelson Greaves
- Produced by: Sophie Cassidy
- Starring: Russell Crowe; Jacob Tremblay; Annabelle Wallis; Shailene Woodley
- Cinematography: Yves Bélanger
- Edited by: Zach Staenberg
- Music by: Marco Beltrami
- Production companies: 2.0 Entertainment; MRC Film
- Distributed by: Netflix
- Release date: September 25, 2026
- Running time: 100 minutes
- Country: United States
- Language: English

Unabomber is a 2026 American crime drama film directed by Janus Metz Pedersen and written by Sam Chalsen and Nelson Greaves. Based on the domestic terrorist Ted Kaczynski, the film stars Russell Crowe, Jacob Tremblay, Annabelle Wallis, and Shailene Woodley.

Produced by 2.0 Entertainment and MRC Film, Unabomber was released in the United States by Netflix on September 25, 2026. The film received mixed reviews from critics.

== Plot ==
In 1958, 16-year-old mathematics prodigy Theodore "Ted" Kaczynski enters Harvard University. While studying there, he participates in a series of psychological experiments conducted by professor Henry Murray and Christiana Morgan. During the sessions, Ted is questioned about his personal beliefs and subjected to confrontational interviews.

Ted becomes increasingly isolated from his friends and family while developing strong opposition to industrialization and technological society. He continues to participate in the experiments despite their effects on him. Morgan also becomes increasingly concerned about the methods being used, while a skeptical Murray continues the research.

Ted later confronts Murray and reveals that he is the author of the letters Murray has been receiving supposedly from his peers praising his experiments. He accuses Murray of manipulating his subjects and rejects Murray’s assessment of his mental state. Before leaving, Ted gives Murray a copy of Moby-Dick containing an underlined passage and a package resembling the devices he will later send through the mail.

During the 1990s, the FBI investigate a series of mail bombings conducted by a terrorist known as the "Unabomber". Agent Joanne Miller studies the bomber’s writings and argues that his language and beliefs may help identify him.

After the Unabomber’s manifesto is published, Ted's estranged brother David and his wife Linda recognize similarities between the manifesto and letters written by Ted. The couple contact the authorities, and Miller compares the documents.

Investigators later identify Ted as a suspect and locate him living in a remote cabin in Montana. The FBI raids the cabin and arrests Ted, ending the search for the Unabomber.

Closing titles reveal that Ted was sentenced to life in prison, where he killed himself in 2023.

== Cast ==
- Jacob Tremblay as Ted Kaczynski
- Russell Crowe as Henry Murray
- Shailene Woodley as FBI Agent Joanne Miller
- Annabelle Wallis as Christiana Morgan
- Alexander Ludwig as Leo Driver
- Steven Ogg as Dean Kaplan
- Marc Menchaca as Eddie Turrell
- Gus Halper as Mr. C

== Production ==
In July 2020, Doug Belgrad of 2.0 Entertainment hired Sam Chalsen and Nelson Greaves to write a feature film about the Unabomber.

In June 2025, it was announced that Jacob Tremblay, Russell Crowe, Shailene Woodley, Annabelle Wallis, Alexander Ludwig, Steven Ogg, and Marc Menchaca would star in Unabom, with Janus Metz set to direct. Netflix would distribute. Filming took place that month in Montreal, Canada. In March 2026, the film was retitled Unabomber.

== Reception ==
On the review aggregator website Rotten Tomatoes, 25% of 53 critics' reviews are positive, with an average rating of 4.8/10. The website's consensus reads: "Playing armchair psychologist to one of America's most infamous killers, Unabomber's fine acting can't compensate for an unconvincing thesis." Metacritic, which uses a weighted average, assigned the film a score of 46 out of 100, based on 18 critics, indicating "mixed or average" reviews.

Robert Daniels of RogerEbert.com gave the film a two out of four stars rating, criticizing its use of tropes from the biopic genre and saying that it felt like a television film. Richard Lawson of The Hollywood Reporter criticized both Crowe's and Tremblay's performances, calling the former "phone[d] in". Guy Lodge of Variety gave the film a negative review, criticizing, among other things, the movie's "rote dialogue and autopilot true-crime styling", further saying that the interwoven timelines make the film feel like "two disparate but half-baked Unabomber projects have been unhappily welded together". Also discussing the film's two timelines, Jeannette Catsoulis of The New York Times criticized the section of the film set in the 1990s, while giving a positive review of the part set in the 1950s, saying it was interesting and suspenseful and offering praise for Crowe and Tremblay.
