= Ride the Cyclone =

Canadian 2009 musical

- Official poster from Concord Theatricals
- Music: Jacob Richmond; Brooke Maxwell
- Lyrics: Jacob Richmond; Brooke Maxwell
- Book: Jacob Richmond; Brooke Maxwell
- Premiere: March 11 2009: Atomic Vaudeville, Victoria, British Columbia, Canada
- Productions: 2009 Victoria; 2011 Toronto; 2013 Western Canada tour 2015 Chicago; 2016 Off-Broadway; 2018 Seattle; 2019 Atlanta; 2019 Minneapolis; 2023 Washington, DC; 2024 Las Vegas; 2024 Sydney; 2025 Buenos Aires; 2025 London; 2025 Växjö; 2025 Querétaro; 2025 Tel Aviv; 2026 Mexico City; 2026 New Zealand; 2026 London; 2026 Canmore

Ride the Cyclone is a 2009 musical with music, lyrics and book by Jacob Richmond and Brooke Maxwell. It is the second installment in Richmond's Uranium Teen Scream Trilogy, along with Legoland, a collection of three theatrical works, one not yet written, that take place in the exaggerated Uranium City.

The story revolves around members of the St. Cassian High School chamber choir of Uranium City, Saskatchewan, who have perished on a faulty roller coaster called The Cyclone. Each tells their story, in song form, to win the reward from a fortune teller machine: the chance to return to life.

== Productions ==
The world premiere production by Atomic Vaudeville took place in Victoria, British Columbia at the Metro Studio Theatre on March 11 2009. It was directed by Britt Small with production design by Hank Pine and James Insell. A production played at the Theatre Passe Muraille, Toronto in 2011, and there was a tour of Western Canada in 2013.

The American premiere took place at the Chicago Shakespeare Theater. Directed by Rachel Rockwell, the production opened on 29 September 2015, playing a limited run until 8 November. With Rockwell again directing, the show opened Off-Broadway at the Lucille Lortel Theatre with an official opening night on 30 November 2016, ending its limited run on 18 December. Taylor Louderman was initially cast in the production but withdrew during previews, citing creative differences. She was replaced by original Chicago company member Tiffany Tatreau. The cast also included Alex Wyse and Gus Halper. Charles Isherwood of The New York Times praised the show, stating "this delightfully weird and just plain delightful show... will provide the kind of thrills we look for in all musical comedies, however outlandish their subject matter: an engaging and varied score, knocked out of the park by a superlative cast, and a supremely witty book." The same production went to Seattle in 2018 in collaboration with the 5th Avenue Theatre, operating in the affiliate ACT Theatre. Following the death of original director/choreographer Rachel Rockwell, a production based on Rockwell's direction opened at the Alliance Theater in Atlanta in 2019, directed by Leora Morris and featuring much of the same cast and creative team.

The show made its European premiere in London at Southwark Playhouse Elephant from November 14, 2025, with an opening night on November 19, until January 10, 2026. Lizzi Gee directed and choreographed the production. The production returned to Southwark Playhouse Elephant in the summer of 2026.

== Synopsis ==
A mysterious, headless girl in a school uniform sings about an unending dream-like state ("Dream of Life").

The Amazing Karnak, a mechanical fortune teller, introduces himself as the show's narrator and explains that he is able to predict the exact moment and cause of a person's death; however, the carnival in which he operates set him to "Family Fun Novelty Mode," rendering him only able to repeat vague predictions and fairground advertising. Karnak reveals that a rat— whom he has named Virgil— has been gradually chewing through his power cable and will soon kill them both. "As there is nothing more base than death," Virgil is enlisted to play the bass.

Karnak conjures the memory of five teenagers from the Saint Cassian Chamber Choir, who will soon die in a crash on a malfunctioning rollercoaster, The Cyclone ("Uranium"). As they derail, the teens lament their lives in Uranium City, a once-boomtown that declined drastically with the closure of its uranium mines ("Minor Turn"). Guilty over his inability to prevent their deaths, Karnak has summoned the teens' spirits, allowing them to compete for a chance to return to life. Karnak reads a prophecy: "The one who wants to win it the most shall redeem the loser in order to complete the whole."

Karnak announces the presence of a mystery contestant. The headless character who opened the show arrives, revealed to be another victim of the crash. Since no family came to claim her body and Karnak never read her fortune, her identity is unknown, so she goes by the name given to her by the coroner: "Jane Doe" ("Jane Doe's Entrance"). Jane has replaced her head with that of a doll, whose body she carries around with her. Though Jane's appearance disturbs the others, the competition begins.

The first contestant is Ocean O'Connell Rosenberg, an overachieving perfectionist who grew up among "far-left-of-center humanists" ("Ocean's Bumper"). She attempts to convince Karnak that she is the worthiest of life compared to the others, as she has the highest chance of succeeding in the world ("What the World Needs"). To Ocean's dismay, Karnak reveals that the choice will be made by group consensus. Though she clumsily attempts to take back her words, the others, including her best friend Constance Blackwood, are extremely offended by her social Darwinist rant ("I Love You Guys").

The next contestant is Noel Gruber, the only gay boy in Uranium who, despite being "an aspiring poet laureate", was stuck working at Taco Bell ("Noel's Bumper"). He sings about his desire to live the tragic, loveless life of his alter ego, French prostitute "Monique Gibeau" (inspired by Marlene Dietrich in The Blue Angel), who dies of typhoid flu at the end of the song ("That Fucked Up Girl (Noel's Lament)"). Ocean expresses annoyance that Noel's song did not have a moral ("Every Story's Got a Lesson") and enlists Constance to help her perform one of their anti-drug improv PSA's, which Ocean has scripted in advance. When Constance tries to ad-lib, Ocean scolds her.

The third contestant is Mischa Bachinski, a Ukrainian adoptee who immigrated to Canada when his mother, dying from radiation poisoning while on a Chernobyl disaster clean-up crew, put him up for adoption and lied about his age. To cope with the isolating treatment he received from his adoptive parents, Mischa turned to "self-aggrandizing commercialized hip-hop," posting his own original raps to YouTube under the name "Bad Egg" ("Mischa's Bumper"). His song begins as an autotune gangsta rap track ("This Song Is Awesome") before transitioning into a passionate love ballad about his online fiancée whom he met through his YouTube comment section ("Talia"), after which he breaks down in tears, falling into Noel's arms. Ocean unsuccessfully tries to regain favor with the class, lamenting that they "all died virgins." Karnak prompts Constance to go next, calling it a "perfect segue," but she refuses.

The fourth contestant is Ricky Potts, a socially awkward boy who witnessed the killing of his Pentecostal pastor father by their pet viper JoJo, causing him to become mute. Neglected by his family and desperate to combat his loneliness in life, Ricky spent his free time retreating into elaborate science fiction fantasies based on a childhood spent with his fourteen cats, imagining himself as the intergalactic savior of a race of anthropomorphic "sexy cat women" from a distant planet ("Ricky's Bumper / Space Age Bachelor Man").

Rather than singing about her hopes and dreams, Jane Doe sings about her despair. Though she was presumed to be a member of the choir because of her uniform, her identity remained unknown following the stress-induced death of their choir director later that day, and her spirit has no memory of her life ("Jane Doe's Bumper" / "The Ballad of Jane Doe"). After hearing Jane's tale, the choir holds a makeshift birthday party for her. When they realize the traditional song would require Jane to have a name, Ocean leads the class in making something new ("The New Birthday Song").

Ricky bonds with Jane by naming her Savannah, one of the names he had been "saving up" in life, while Noel and Mischa connect over seeing each other as they want to be seen. Meanwhile, Ocean goads Constance into voting for her, while also admitting that she refuses to vote for anyone other than herself. Constance, fed up with Ocean's conceited behavior, finally stands up for herself by punching Ocean in the breast.

Finally taking her turn ("Constance's Bumper"), Constance reveals that three hours before the accident, she had lost her virginity to a 32-year-old carny in a port-o-potty, which she admits was an act of self-loathing. Frustrated with her image as the "nicest girl in town," Constance confesses that she spent much of her life resenting her parents, who lived and worked in Uranium their entire lives, but finally learned to appreciate the simple joys in life the moment the rollercoaster derailed ("Jawbreaker / Sugar Cloud"). Ocean apologizes to Constance, and the friends embrace.

Karnak suddenly changes the rules, asserting that Ocean alone will make the deciding vote as she has the highest grade point average. Recalling Karnak's prophecy, Ocean refuses to vote for herself and realizes that Jane is the only one without memories to take to the afterlife with her, lamenting that while the teenagers died young, they at least had the chance to enjoy life. The choir supports Ocean's decision, and Jane is sent back to the Other Side. Karnak reveals her true name: Penny Lamb. A home movie compilation of Penny's life from birth to old age is played as the choir watches on ("It's Not a Game"). Virgil finally tears through the rubber, killing Karnak before he can give his final piece of insight. As he loses power, he reverts to the message he gave the choir just prior to their deaths: "Your lucky number is seven. You will soar to great heights. Be sure to ride the Cyclone."

Somewhere outside of limbo, the remaining teens unite and sing an uplifting song ("It's Just a Ride"). The voice of Jane Doe echoes her opening song as the teens travel toward whatever comes next.

== Characters ==
- The Amazing Karnak – A mechanical fortune-telling machine that serves as the narrator and gamemaster. He appears several times throughout the cast album, breaking the fourth wall by directly addressing the listener.
- Ocean O'Connell Rosenberg – Born December 22, Ocean is a competitive overachiever who struggles to put others before herself.
- Noel Gruber – Born March 5, he is the only gay man in Uranium and has an obsession with French New Wave cinema. He sings as his alter-ego: Monique Gibeau, a hooker in post-war France, who is partially based on Marlene Dietrich as Lola Lola in The Blue Angel.
- Mischa Bachinski – Born August 18 in a small town outside of Odesa, Mischa is a Ukrainian adoptee who puts on a gangster persona to conceal his passionate nature. He sings two songs: one about autotune and money, in the style of a traditional autotune rap song, and the second song about his online fiancée, Talia, whom he met through his YouTube comment section, where he raps under the name of 'Bad Egg'.
- Ricky Potts – Born June 5, Ricky Potts is a mute boy with an overactive imagination. In Karnak's limbo, he gains the ability to speak and, in his song, sings about his fantasies of the 'Zolarian galaxy'.
  - The earliest licensed libretto depicted Ricky as suffering from an unidentified degenerative illness which, in addition to causing muteness, required him to use mobility aids. Ricky's physical ability once inside the afterlife was left open to interpretation, though the original staging depicted him as becoming able-bodied.
- Jane Doe – A decapitated girl who is unsure of her true identity. She is revealed at the end of the show to be Penny Lamb, born April 7. It is unclear if she returns to live a full life as Penny Lamb, or if Penny Lamb has now been reincarnated as someone else.
  - The name "Penny Lamb" was previously used for a character in Jacob Richmond's two-person play Legoland, giving a community service presentation with her brother Ezra. This character is a 16-year-old aspiring animal conservationist who, like Jane Doe, shares animal facts. The play may take place in an alternate continuity, as Penny and Ezra are not only homeschooled but also implied to live in close cultural proximity to Ocean's family. When listing examples of children in their community with "hippie" names, Ocean is not mentioned.
- Constance Blackwood – Born November 14, Constance is the secretly self-loathing "nicest girl in town" who has complicated feelings about her hometown.
- Virgil – The rat chewing through Karnak's power cable, who plays the bass guitar throughout the show.

Cut characters from earlier versions of the show include Trishna (played by Almeera Jiwa), a shy, nerdy girl next door who was into entomology and had a crush on her neighbour Hank. Her character was changed to Astrid, Ocean's Nordic cousin (played by Celine Stubel), in October 2009. Hank (played by Tim Johnston) was repurposed into Astrid's boyfriend, and a character named Corey Ross (played by Carey Wass) would have a rap battle against himself in the show. Astrid and Corey's characters would later be cut to create Mischa Bachinski.

== Musical numbers ==
- "Dream of Life" – Jane Doe
- "Uranium Suite: Uranium / Minor Turn" – Ensemble
- "Jane Doe's Entrance" – Ensemble
- "Ocean's Bumper" - Karnak and Ocean
- "What the World Needs" – Ocean and Ensemble
- "I Love You Guys / Noel's Bumper" - Ocean, Karnak, Noel, Jane Doe (as Estragon from Waiting for Godot), and Constance
- "Noel's Lament" – Noel and Ensemble
- "Every Story's Got a Lesson" – Ocean and Ensemble
- "Mischa's Bumper" - Karnak and Mischa
- "This Song is Awesome" – Mischa and Ensemble
- "Talia" – Mischa and Ensemble
- "Ricky's Bumper" - Karnak, Ricky, and Noel (as Father Markus)
- "Space Age Bachelor Man" – Ricky and Ensemble
- "Jane Doe's Bumper" - Karnak and Jane Doe
- "The Ballad of Jane Doe" – Jane Doe and Ensemble
- "The New Birthday Song" – Ensemble
- "Constance's Bumper" - Karnak, Constance, Ricky and Noel (as other Students), and Mischa (as the Carnie)
- "Jawbreaker" – Constance
- "Sugar Cloud" – Constance and Ensemble
- "It's Not a Game / It's Just a Ride" – Ensemble

Notes

- A World Premiere Cast Recording, also referred to by Richmond and Maxwell as a "concept album", was released digitally on May 7, 2021, featuring the 2019 Atlanta production cast (minus Karl Hamilton, who was replaced with writer Jacob Richmond in the role of Karnak) and several cut songs. It also features Karnak breaking the fourth wall several times, addressing the listener in the context of an album instead of the show.
- "Karnak's Theme," a former overture, was re-implemented for the show's World Premiere Cast Recording as an introduction to "Dream of Life." Although the song has been cut, the show's "Bumper" segments are genre-specific variations on this theme. The original "Karnak's Theme" is included on the cast album as a bonus track.
- Also on the World Premiere Cast Recording, "Jane Doe's Bumper" is renamed to "Meet Jane Doe," as this is the only Bumper to feature on the album. In the actual libretto, this naming convention (ex, "Meet Noel Gruber") comes from small fanfare sound effects used during the choir's catchphrases.
- "The Uranium Suite," the show's current opening number, is featured in the 2019 Atlanta production of the show, the World Premiere Cast Recording, and all productions onwards. In the original Canadian productions, this song was a combination of "The Uranium Suite" and a song called "Tragic Fact." In the 2015 Chicago and 2016 Off-Broadway versions of the show, the show opened with the "Fall Fair Suite." In the 2018 Seattle production, this song was replaced by "Waiting For The Drop."
- Initially, Ocean's song was titled "Play to Win". It was a gospel-style song, as opposed to the energetic, pop-style "What the World Needs." It was cut from the show. However, there are still snippets of the song available on YouTube and SoundCloud, alongside the original "The Ballad of Jane Doe," "Sugar Cloud," "The Uranium Suite / Tragic Fact," and "Space Age Bachelor Man."
- "Noel's Lament" originally included a section in which Monique Gibeau, Noel's alter ego, conceived a child with an unnamed lover, which she then sold to two Romani travelling merchants. This was cut during previews of the 2016 production onwards. This version is also available on SoundCloud.
- During the 2018 Seattle production, a song named "Be Safe, Be Good" took the place of the song "It's Not a Game / It's Just a Ride." However, "It's Not a Game / It's Just a Ride" would return for the 2019 Atlanta production and was featured in the World Premiere Cast Recording as a bonus track. It was dedicated to the show's late director Rachel Rockwell and retitled "Be Safe, Be Good (For Rachel)," performed by co-writer Brooke Maxwell and the show's cast.
- "Noel's Lament" fits the definition of a ballad, while "The Ballad of Jane Doe" would be more accurately called a lament. This is speculated to be a deliberate choice by the songwriters, as Noel and Jane Doe each have what the other wants; Noel had a life and a family that Jane never got to experience, while Noel craved tragedy, and Jane's story is nothing but tragic.

== Cast ==
Character	Victoria (March 2009)	Victoria (October 2009)	Summerworks (2010)	Canadian Tour (2011)	Canadian Tour (2012-2013)	Concert Cycle (2015)	Chicago (2015)	Off Broadway (2016)	Seattle (2018)	Atlanta (2019)	World Premiere Cast Recording (2021)	McCarter Theatre (2022)	Blue Bridge Theatre (2022)	Arena Stage (2023)	Sydney (2024)	Buenos Aires (2025)	Off-West End / London (2025)	Växjö (2025)	Tel Aviv (2025-2026)	Mexico City (2026)	New Zealand (2026)	London (2026)
Virgil the Rat	Alex Wlasenko	Alex Wlasenko	Alex Wlasenko	Hank Pine	Sebastian Britneff	Alex Wlasenko	Chuck Webb	Bobby Wooten	Spencer Hoveskeland	Marc Miller							Hamish Barry		Tomer Kagan/Shai Arava			Hamish Barry
The Amazing Karnak	Jacob Richmond (audio), Jen Wilcox (puppeteer)	Jacob Richmond (audio), Jen Wilcox (puppeteer)	Jacob Richmond (audio), Jen Wilcox (puppeteer)	Jacob Richmond (audio), James Insell (puppeteer)	Carey William Wass (voice), James Insell (puppeteer)	Jacob Richmond (archival recordings), James Insell (puppeteer)	Karl Hamilton	Karl Hamilton	Karl Hamilton	Karl Hamilton	Jacob Richmond	Jeffery Binder	Treena Stubel (Voiced by Jacob Richmond)	Marc Geller	Pamela Rabe	Ezequiel Salas	Edward Wu	Christofer Lindberg	Nir Rosenthal/Yuval Beker	Joel Abad	Jthan Morgan	Divina de Campo
Ocean O'Connell Rosenberg	Rielle Braid	Rielle Braid	Rielle Braid	Rielle Braid	Rielle Braid	Rielle Braid	Tiffany Tatreau	Taylor Louderman/Tiffany Tatreau	Tiffany Tatreau	Tiffany Tatreau	Tiffany Tatreau	Katerina McCrimmon	Madeleine Humeny	Shinah Hey	Karis Oka	Barbi Ainsztain	Baylie Carson	Matilda Stjernqvist	Liri Shirav	Farah Justiniani	Lane Corby	Kayna Montecillo
Noel Gruber	Kholby Wardell	Kholby Wardell	Kholby Wardell	Kholby Wardell	Kholby Wardell	Kholby Wardell	Kholby Wardell	Kholby Wardell	Kholby Wardell	Kholby Wardell	Kholby Wardell	Nick Martinez	Carter Gulseth	Nick Martinez	Bailey Dunnage	Andy Alonso	Damon Gould	Vilgot Staxhammar	Sagi Shulman	Lorenzo Lopez	Logan Tahiwi	Josh Butler
Misha Bachynskyi	Carey William Wass	Cut from the show	Carey William Wass	Matthew Coulson	Jameson Matthew Parker	Britt Small, Brooke Maxwell, James Insell	Russell Mernagh	Gus Halper	Adam Standley	Chaz Duffy	Chaz Duffy	Eli Mayer	Matthew Coulson	Eli Mayer	Lincoln Elliot	Horno Ruiz	Bartek Kraszewski	Jonatan Blom Ekenberg	Tal Yavits	Diego Enriquez	Jackson Burling	Bartek Krazewski
Ricky Potts	Elliott Loran	Elliott Loran	Elliott Loran	Elliott Loran	Elliott Loran	Elliott Loran	Jackson Evans	Alex Wyse	Connor Russell	Scott Redmond	Scott Redmond	Yannick-Robin Eike Mirko	Keith MacMillian	Matthew Boyd Snyder	Justin Gray	Jerónimo Dodds	Jack Maverick	Marcus Sandgren	Yuval Beker/Tomer Kagan	Alain Peñaloza	Henry Ashby	Jack Maverick
Jane Doe	Sarah Jane Pelzer	Sarah Jane Pelzer	Sarah Jane Pelzer	Sarah Jane Pelzer	Sarah Jane Pelzer	Sarah Jane Pelzer	Emily Rohm	Emily Rohm	Emily Rohm	Emily Rohm	Emily Rohm	Ashlyn Maddox	Anna van der Hooft	Ashlyn Maddox / Katie Mariko Murray	Ava Madon	Luli Ingold	Grace Galloway	Anna Lundh	Yael Intrater	Tannia Davila	Maya Handa Naff	Grace Galloway
Constance Blackwood	Kelly Hudson	Kelly Hudson	Kelly Hudson	Kelly Hudson	Kelly Hudson	Kelly Hudson	Lillian Castillo	Lillian Castillo	Lillian Castillo	Lillian Castillo	Lillian Castillo	Princess Sasha Victome	Yasmin Doshun	Gabrielle Dominique	Natalie Abbot	Azul Cabrera	Robyn Gilbertson	Lina Granehäll	Ofir Kimberg	Ixchel Ragüe	Jade Merematira	Robyn Gilbertson
Nataliia Bolynsky	Not added yet	Not added yet	Celine Stubel	Celine Stubel	Celine Stubel	Doesn't appear	Charlotte Kennett	Charlotte Kennett	Jana Ross	Jana Ross							Leah Glater					Leah Glater
Corey Ross	Not added yet	Carey William Wass	Cut from the show	Cut from the show	Cut from the show	Cut from the show	Cut from the show	Cut from the show	Cut from the show	Cut from the show	Cut from the show	Cut from the show	Cut from the show	Cut from the show	Cut from the show	Cut from the show	Cut from the show	Cut from the show	Cut from the show	Cut from the show	Cut from the show	Cut from the show
Trishna Virahanna	Almeera Jiwa-Pratt	Cut from the show	Cut from the show	Cut from the show	Cut from the show	Cut from the show	Cut from the show	Cut from the show	Cut from the show	Cut from the show	Cut from the show	Cut from the show	Cut from the show	Cut from the show	Cut from the show	Cut from the show	Cut from the show	Cut from the show	Cut from the show	Cut from the show	Cut from the show	Cut from the show
Hank Lover	Tim Johnston	Cut from the show	Cut from the show	Cut from the show	Cut from the show	Cut from the show	Cut from the show	Cut from the show	Cut from the show	Cut from the show	Cut from the show	Cut from the show	Cut from the show	Cut from the show	Cut from the show	Cut from the show	Cut from the show	Cut from the show	Cut from the show	Cut from the show	Cut from the show	Cut from the show
Wes Farmer	Not added yet	Tim Johnston	Cut from the show	Cut from the show	Cut from the show	Cut from the show	Cut from the show	Cut from the show	Cut from the show	Cut from the show	Cut from the show	Cut from the show	Cut from the show	Cut from the show	Cut from the show	Cut from the show	Cut from the show	Cut from the show	Cut from the show	Cut from the show	Cut from the show	Cut from the show
Asløg "Astrid" Igneborg	Not added yet	Celine Stubel	Cut from the show	Cut from the show	Cut from the show	Cut from the show	Cut from the show	Cut from the show	Cut from the show	Cut from the show	Cut from the show	Cut from the show	Cut from the show	Cut from the show	Cut from the show	Cut from the show	Cut from the show	Cut from the show	Cut from the show	Cut from the show	Cut from the show	Cut from the show

=== Notable Replacements ===
==== Concert Cycle (2015) ====
- James Insell as Mischa Bachinski

== McCarter Theater controversy ==
In November 2022, the actor who portrayed Ricky Potts in the McCarter Theater production, Yannick-Robin Eike Mirko, the first disabled person to play Potts, was allegedly fired during the run. He alleged on TikTok that on May 26, 2022, McCarter dismissed them on basis of disability after a medical emergency sent him offstage the previous night. Their able-bodied understudy, Matthew Boyd Snyder, assumed the role of Ricky Potts for the final three shows of the McCarter run as well as the Arena run.

Revisions made during the McCarter production to decrease ableist language, in addition to the removal of references to Ricky having a movement disability, would later be integrated into the officially licensed script in 2023. The removal of Ricky's physical disability, as well as its replacement with trauma-induced muteness, was criticized on social media by several fans, using the hashtag "#SaveRickyPotts." Jacob Richmond and Arena Stage, the venue hosting the McCarter production's 2023 revival, responded in a Tweet that these changes would not bar disabled actors from playing any roles in the show.

== Awards and nominations ==
Year	Award	Category	Nominee	Result
2010	SummerWorks Award	Prize for Production		Won
2010	SummerWorks Award	The NOW Magazine Audience Choice Award		Won
2012	Toronto Theatre Critics Award	Best New Musical		Won
2012	Toronto Theatre Critics Award	Best Director of a Musical	Britt Small and Jacob Richmond	Won
2012	Toronto Theatre Critics Award	Best Supporting Actor in a Musical	Elliott Loran	Won
2012	Dora Mavor Moore Award	Outstanding Touring Production		Won
2013	Saskatoon and Area Theatre Awards	Achievement in Production		Won
2013	Saskatoon and Area Theatre Awards	Achievement in Ensemble Performance		Won
2013	Saskatoon and Area Theatre Awards	Achievement in Costume Design	James Insell and Ingrid Hansen	Nominated
2013	Saskatoon and Area Theatre Awards	Achievement in Directing	Britt Small and Jacob Richmond	Nominated
2013	Saskatoon and Area Theatre Awards	Achievement in Sound Design	Brooke Maxwell	Nominated
2016	Jeff Awards	Ensemble; Projections/Video Design; Production of a Musical-Large	Mike Tutaj	Nominated
2016	Jeff Awards	Director – Musical	Rachel Rockwell	Won
2017	Drama League Awards	Outstanding Production of a Broadway or Off-Broadway Musical		Nominated
2017	The Joe A. Callaway Award	Excellence in Choreography	Rachel Rockwell	Won
2017	Lucille Lortel Award	Outstanding Musical		Nominated
2017	Lucille Lortel Award	Outstanding Featured Actor in a Musical	Gus Halper	Nominated
2017	Lucille Lortel Award	Outstanding Featured Actress in a Musical	Emily Rohm	Nominated
2017	Lucille Lortel Award	Outstanding Scenic Design	Scott Davis	Nominated
2017	Lucille Lortel Award	Outstanding Lighting Design	Greg Hoffman	Nominated
2017	Henry Hewes Design Award	Scenic Design	Mike Tutaj	Nominated
2018	BroadwayWorld Award	Best Musical (Larger Budget Theatre – Local)		Nominated
2018	BroadwayWorld Award	Best Lighting Design (Larger Budget Theatre – Local)	Gregory Hofmann and Mike Tutaj	Nominated
2018	BroadwayWorld Award	Best Scenic Design (Larger Budget Theatre – Local)	Scott Davis	Nominated
2019	BroadwayWorld Award	Best New Work (Professional)		Nominated
2019	The Suzi Bass Award	Outstanding Production – Musical		Won
2019	The Suzi Bass Award	Outstanding Acting Ensemble – Musical		Won
2019	The Suzi Bass Award	Outstanding Direction – Musical	Leora Morris	Won
2019	The Suzi Bass Award	Outstanding Music Direction	Greg Matteson	Nominated
2019	The Suzi Bass Award	Outstanding Lighting Design	Greg Hofmann	Won
2019	The Suzi Bass Award	Outstanding Scenic Design	Scott Davis	Nominated
2019	The Suzi Bass Award	Outstanding Sound Design	Clay Benning	Won
2019	The Suzi Bass Award	Outstanding Projection Design	Mike Tutaj	Won
2019	Gypsy Rose Lee Award	Excellence in Sound Design (Large Theaters)	Christopher Walker	Nominated

== TikTok virality ==
In 2022, after a clip of Emily Rohm singing "The Ballad of Jane Doe" was circulated on TikTok from a leaked Off-Broadway archival recording, Ride the Cyclone became a viral sensation on the app as other clips, as well as tracks from the cast recording, began to be used in videos. Many users created fan theories, memes, and cosplays relating to the musical. The musical became particularly popular with Gen Z users. Several TikTok videos gained up to 400,000 likes and millions of views.

== Related works ==
Richmond's fictionalization of Uranium City originated with the play Legoland, following two reformed drug traffickers asked to present their personal histories to a high school assembly. A third entry to complete the Uranium Teen Scream trilogy is allegedly in the works.
