= Gus Halper =

American actor (born 1992)

- Gus Halper as Erik Menendez in Law & Order True Crime (2017)
- Born: July 2, 1992 (age 34); New York City, U.S.
- Education: University of North Carolina School of the Arts
- Occupation: Actor
- Years active: 2002–present
- Spouse: Emma Geer (m. 2023)
- Children: 1

Gus Halper (born July 2, 1992) is an American actor. He is best known for his roles in the series Law & Order True Crime: The Menendez Murders (2017), Fear the Walking Dead (2021), and Law & Order: Organized Crime (2022–2023), and in the films Goat (2016), Rustin (2023), and Unabomber (2026). He also appeared in the 2016 off-Broadway production of the musical Ride the Cyclone, playing Mischa Bachinski.

== Early life and education ==
Halper was born on July 2, 1992 in Manhattan, New York City. His mother, Deann Simmons Halper, is an actress and theater director. Halper graduated from the University of North Carolina School of the Arts, which his mother had previously attended, in 2014.

== Career ==
In 2014, while studying at the University of North Carolina School of the Arts, Halper played Romeo in the university's production of William Shakespeare's Romeo and Juliet. After graduating, he starred in the ABC television film The Kingmakers as Eli, a young man who infiltrates an Ivy League university to investigate his sister's death. The following year, Halper appeared alongside Nick Jonas and Ben Schnetzer in Goat, which was produced by James Franco. The same year, he portrayed Ukrainian teenager Mischa Bachinski in an off-Broadway production of Ride the Cyclone at the Lucille Lortel Theatre.

In 2017, Halper portrayed convicted murderer Erik Menendez in the eight-part series Law & Order True Crime: The Menendez Murders, as well as starred for six episodes as Mikey Scaramucci in Happy! until 2018. A year later, he appeared in an episode of Ramy, then five episodes of both Jett and Dickinson. In 2020, Halper then starred in one episode of the series Love Life and appeared as Blaze in the film Holler, alongside Jessica Barden. In 2021, he appeared in an episode of Evil as Graham Lucian and two episodes of Fear the Walking Dead as Will. A year later, Halper appeared as Teddy Silas, a construction foreman, in Law & Order: Organized Crime. In 2023, he portrayed social democratic activist Tom Kahn, the assistant and lover of civil rights activist Bayard Rustin, in the biographical film Rustin.

In 2019, Halper was cast as Brendan Lalor in the workshop for the musical Sing Street, which then officially premiered its off-broadway run at the New York Theatre Workshop on December 16th and closed on January 26th, 2020. Following the hiatus of the Broadway transfer due to the COVID-19 pandemic, he reprised his role as Brendan for the cast recording that was released in April 2020.

== Personal life ==
Halper married actress Emma Geer on October 15, 2023. The couple welcomed their first child in early 2026.

== Credits ==
Key
†	Denotes productions that have not yet been released

=== Film ===
Year	Title	Role	Notes	Ref.
2013	Rémy	Emmanuel Rémy	Short film	
2015	Ricki and the Flash	Impatient Traveler		
2016	Goat	Chance		
2016	Couch	Jeff	Short film	
2017	Guy	Guy	Short film	
2018	Maine	Dragon		
2019	Cold Pursuit	Bone		
2019	Safe Space	Jacques	Short film	
2020	Holler	Blaze		
2020	Winning Streak	Tyson Drake	Short film	
2023	Rustin	Tom Kahn		
2026	Unabomber	Mr. C		
2027	Skipping Town †		Short film	

=== Television ===
Year	Title	Role	Notes	Ref.
2014	Galyntine	Kyree	TV Movie	
2015	Public Morals	Sergio Tedesco	4 episodes	
2015	The Kingmakers	Eli	TV Movie	
2016	Power	Alby	3 episodes	
2016	Chicago P.D.	Oliver Tuxhorn	Episode: "300,000 Likes"	
2017	Mercy Street		Episode: "Southern Mercy"	
2017	Law & Order True Crime	Erik Menendez	8 episodes	
2017–2018	Happy!	Mikey Scaramucci	6 episodes	
2018	Madam Secretary	Nathan Cleminger	Episode: "The Chaos Game"	
2019	Ramy	Shawn	Episode: "Do the Ramadan"	
2019	Jett	Neal	5 episodes	
2019	Dickinson	Joseph	5 episodes	
2020	Love Life	Danny Two Phones	Episode: "Danny Two Phones"	
2021	Evil	Graham Lucian	Episode: "I is for IRS"	
2021	Fear the Walking Dead	Will	2 episodes	
2022–2023	Law & Order: Organized Crime	Teddy Silas	8 episodes	
2026	The Beauty	Ashley Sanders	Episode: "Beautiful Chimp Face"	
2026	The Shards	Bruce	3 episodes	
TBA	Criminal †	Ricky Lawless		

=== Web ===
Year	Title	Role	Notes	Ref.
2018	Today in New York	Co-writer, co-producer		
2022	The Lip Sync Fables	Prince		

=== Theater ===
Year	Title	Role	Venue	Ref.
2013	She Loves Me	Georg Nowack	UNCSA production	
2014	Romeo and Juliet	Romeo	UNCSA production	
2014	A Time for Singing	Iestyn Evans	Saint Peter's Church (York Theatre Company), Off-Broadway	
2016	Ride the Cyclone	Mischa Bachinski	Lucille Lortel Theatre, Off-Broadway	
2019–2020	Sing Street	Brendan Lalor	New York Theatre Workshop, Off-Broadway	

=== Cast Recordings ===
- 2020: Sing Street (Original Broadway Cast Recording)
