= Becky Ann Baker =

American actress (born 1953)

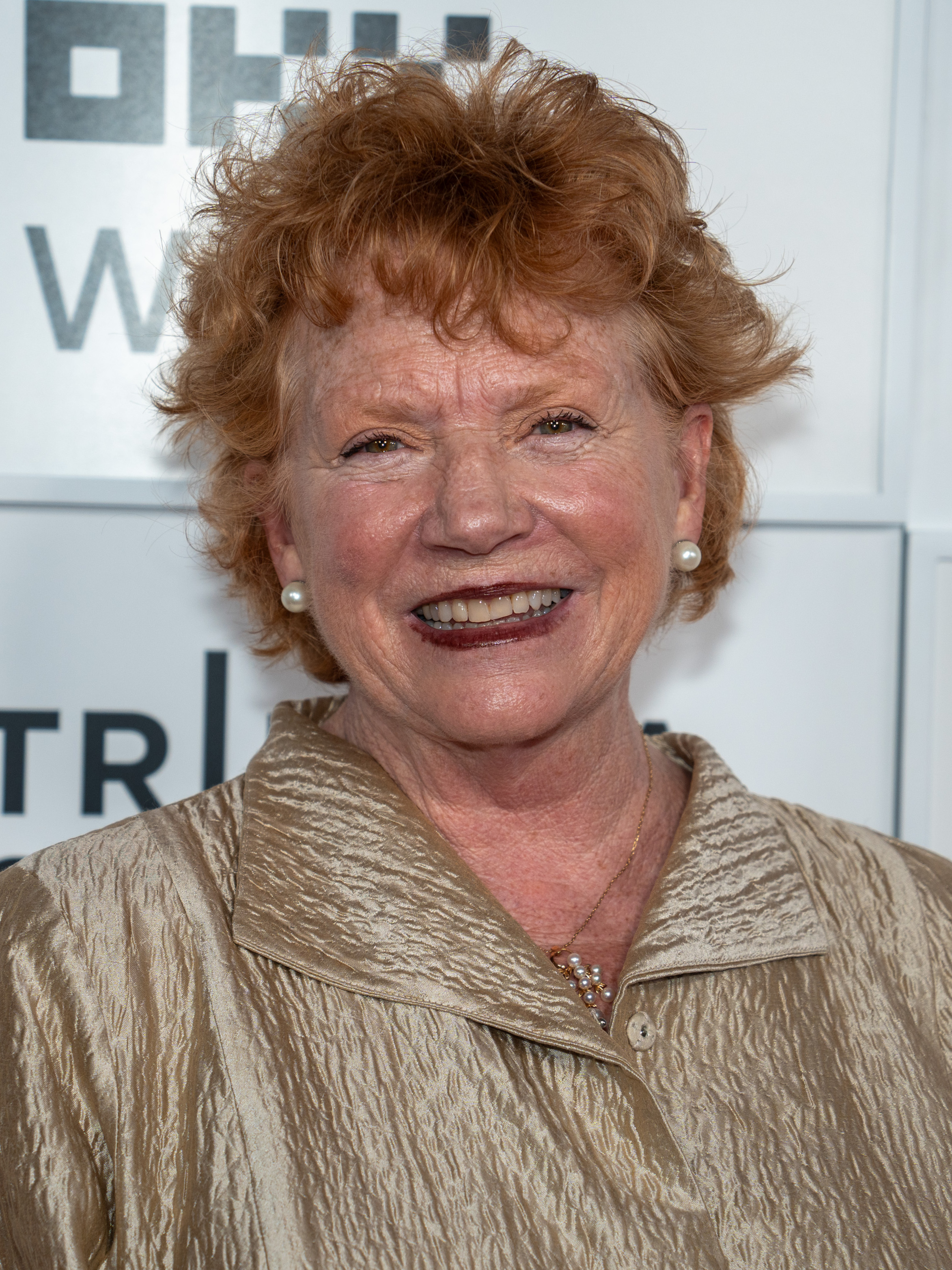
- Baker at the 2025 Tribeca Festival
- Born: Becky Ann Gelke; February 17, 1953 (age 73); Fort Knox, Kentucky, U.S.
- Other name: Becky Gelke
- Occupation: Actress
- Years active: 1978–present
- Spouse: Dylan Baker (m. 1990)
- Children: 1

Becky Ann Baker (née Gelke; born February 17, 1953) is an American actress. She is best known for her roles as Jean Weir on the NBC comedy-drama series Freaks and Geeks (1999–2000) and as Loreen Horvath on the HBO comedy-drama series Girls (2012–2017); she earned two Critics' Choice Television Award nominations and a Primetime Emmy Award nomination for the latter.

Baker's film credits include Jacob's Ladder (1990), In & Out (1997), A Simple Plan (1998), Stay (2005), Nights in Rodanthe (2008), Hope Springs (2012), Table 19 (2017), The Half of It (2020), and Holler (2020).

== Early life ==
Becky Ann Gelke was born in Fort Knox, Kentucky, the daughter of a military officer. She graduated from West Springfield High School in Springfield, Virginia and Western Kentucky University.

== Career ==
Baker's film credits include Blue Steel, Jacob's Ladder, Lorenzo's Oil, Unstrung Heroes, Sabrina, Ridley Scott's White Squall, Men in Black, In & Out, Woody Allen's Celebrity, Sam Raimi's A Simple Plan (for which she received a Blockbuster Entertainment Award nomination), Two Weeks Notice, Steven Spielberg's War of the Worlds, Stay, The Night Listener, Death of a President, and Spider-Man 3.

She got her role in Freaks and Geeks after series creator Paul Feig and Judd Apatow saw her performance in Sam Raimi's A Simple Plan. "That really informed their decision to try to use me from having really no huge television experience," she said. In addition to Freaks and Geeks, her television credits include Girls and Stephen King's Storm of the Century as well as guest spots on L.A. Law, Frasier, Star Trek: Voyager, Sex and the City, Law & Order: Special Victims Unit, Oz and All My Children.

An accomplished stage performer, Baker made her Broadway debut in the 1981 production of The Best Little Whorehouse in Texas, and received a Drama-Logue Award in 1994 for her work in Night and Her Stars. She is a founding member of New York-based theatre company The Drama Dept.

In 2009, she appeared in the NBC series Kings, playing the minor role of Jessie Shepherd, mother of protagonist David Shepherd. Her real-life husband, Dylan Baker, played antagonist William Cross in the series.

== Personal life ==
Baker has been married to actor Dylan Baker since 1990. They have a daughter.

== Filmography ==
=== Film ===
| Year | Title | Role | Notes |
|---|---|---|---|
| 1985 | The Protector | Samantha Alexander | |
| 1986 | Agent on Ice | Mrs. Donnelli | |
| 1988 | Full Moon in Blue Water | Dorothy | |
| 1989 | Blue Steel | Nurse #1 | |
| 1990 | Come See the Paradise | Marge McGurn | |
| 1990 | Jacob's Ladder | Nurse | |
| 1992 | That Night | Mrs. Bell | |
| 1992 | Lorenzo's Oil | Pellerman's Secretary | |
| 1995 | Unstrung Heroes | Mrs. Harris | |
| 1995 | Sabrina | Linda | |
| 1996 | White Squall | Ms. Boyde | |
| 1996 | I'm Not Rappaport | Nurse | |
| 1997 | Bad Bosses Go to Hell | Architect Boss | Short film |
| 1997 | Men in Black | Mrs. Redgick | |
| 1997 | In & Out | Darlene | |
| 1998 | Celebrity | Doris | |
| 1998 | A Simple Plan | Nancy Chambers | |
| 1999 | The Confession | Nurse Jeannine Carrounbois | |
| 2002 | Two Weeks Notice | RV Woman | |
| 2005 | War of the Worlds | Disaster Relief Volunteer | |
| 2005 | Tracks | 'Frizzy' | Short film |
| 2005 | Stay | Paramedic #1 / Butch Cook | |
| 2006 | The Night Listener | Waitress | |
| 2006 | Gretchen | Lori Finkle | |
| 2006 | Death of a President | Eleanor Drake | |
| 2007 | Spider-Man 3 | Mrs. Stacy | |
| 2008 | Spinning Into Butter | Ruby | |
| 2008 | Nights in Rodanthe | Dot | |
| 2012 | Hope Springs | Cora | |
| 2012 | The Discoverers | Mary | |
| 2013 | 23 Blast | Patty Wheatley | |
| 2015 | The End of the Tour | Bookstore Manager | |
| 2017 | Table 19 | Carol Milner | |
| 2018 | The Chaperone | Lois | |
| 2019 | After Class | Mary | |
| 2020 | The Half of It | Mrs. Geselschap | |
| 2020 | Holler | Linda | |
| 2022 | Alone Together | Jan | |
| 2022 | Outpost | Bertha | |
| 2024 | Jackpot! | Sweet Irene | |
| 2024 | All Happy Families | Sue Landry | |
| 2025 | Tow | Debbie | |
| 2025 | Our Hero, Balthazar | Elaine | |
| 2025 | Ella McCay | Mrs. Newell | |
| 2026 | Starbright | Nurse Holden | |

=== Television ===
| Year | Title | Role | Notes |
|---|---|---|---|
| 1988 | In the Line of Duty: The F.B.I. Murders | Carol Ann | TV movie |
| 1990 | She Said No | Gail | TV movie |
| 1992 | L.A. Law | Melinda Garrett | Episode: "Beauty and the Breast" |
| 1995 | Frasier | Marge | Episode: "Frasier Grinch" |
| 1996 | The Siege at Ruby Ridge | Elizabeth | TV movie |
| 1996 | Star Trek: Voyager | Ritual Guide | Episode: "Sacred Ground" |
| 1998 | Soul Man | Margo | Episode: "Little Black Dress" |
| 1999 | Storm of the Century | Ursula Godsoe | TV miniseries |
| 1999–2000 | Freaks and Geeks | Jean Weir | 18 episodes |
| 2000 | Wonderland | Dr. Reeples | Episode: "Pilot" |
| 2001 | Sex and the City | Betsy | Episode: "My Motherboard, My Self" |
| 2002 | The Education of Max Bickford | Kathryn | Episode: "Money Changes Everything" |
| 2002 | Law & Order: Special Victims Unit | Mrs. Brice | Episode: "Juvenile" |
| 2002 | Law & Order | Susan Simels | Episode: "Oxymoron" |
| 2003 | Oz | Greta | Episode: "Exeunt Omnes" |
| 2004–2005 | Life as We Know It | Amanda Conner | 4 episodes |
| 2005 | The Exonerated | Defense Attorney | TV movie |
| 2005 | Law & Order | Defense Attorney Carolyn Walters | Episode: "House of Cards" |
| 2006 | Conviction | Deborah Cole | Episode: "Downhill" |
| 2007 | All My Children | Marj Luper | 3 episodes |
| 2009 | Important Things with Demetri Martin | Revenger's Mom | Episode: "Power" |
| 2009 | Kings | Jessie Shepherd | 7 episodes |
| 2010 | The Electric Company | Natalie McNally | Episode: "Bananas" |
| 2010 | Mercy | Gianna | Episode: "There Is No Superwoman" |
| 2010 | Nurse Jackie | Elaine | Episode: "What the Day Brings" |
| 2012 | A Gifted Man | Mary Polanco | Episode: "In Case of a Bolt from the Blue" |
| 2012 | Smash | Mrs. Cartwright | Episodes: "Pilot", "Enter Mr. DiMaggio" |
| 2012–2016 | The Good Wife | Alma Hoff | 3 episodes |
| 2012–2017 | Girls | Loreen Horvath | Recurring; 20 episodes |
| 2013 | Person of Interest | Deputy Erica Schmidt | Episode: "Proteus" |
| 2013 | Elementary | Pam | Episode: "Snow Angels" |
| 2014 | Mind Games | Cathy Steward | Episode: "Asymmetric Dominance" |
| 2014 | Black Box | Eileen Giordano | Episode: "Emotion" |
| 2014 | Law & Order: Special Victims Unit | Vivienne Patton | Episode: "Forgiving Rollins" |
| 2015 | Gotham | Marge | Episode: "Everyone Has a Cobblepot" |
| 2015 | Madam Secretary | Chancellor Frieda Schulz | Episode: "Spartan Figures" |
| 2015 | Last Week Tonight with John Oliver | Deborah | Episode: "Bail" |
| 2016 | Crisis in Six Scenes | Lee | 2 episodes |
| 2017 | Doubt | Eloise Kirk | Episode: "Pilot" |
| 2017 | Unbreakable Kimmy Schmidt | Stacey | Episode: "Kimmy Googles the Internet!" |
| 2017 | The Night Shift | Lily Alister | Episode: "Turbulence" |
| 2017 | NCIS: New Orleans | Special Agent Paula Boyd | Episode: "Rogue Nation" |
| 2017–2022 | The Good Fight | Alma Hoff | 3 episodes |
| 2018–2019 | Brockmire | Jean Brockmire Glasscock | 4 episodes |
| 2019 | The Blacklist | Judge Roberta Wilkins | 6 episodes |
| 2019 | Younger | Bronwyn Madigan | 2 episodes |
| 2019 | Big Little Lies | Judge Marylin Cipriani | 3 episodes |
| 2020 | Little America | Mrs. Wren | Episode: "The Manager" |
| 2020 | Manhunt | Patricia Rudolph | 2 episodes |
| 2020 | Katy Keene | June Kelly | Episode: "Chapter Two: You Can't Hurry Love" |
| 2020 | Hunters | Juanita Kreps | 4 episodes |
| 2020 | Council of Dads | Grandma | 2 episodes |
| 2020 | Little Voice | Elaine | 2 episodes |
| 2020 | Social Distance | Carolyn Currier | Episode: "Humane Animal Trap" |
| 2021 | New Amsterdam | Gwen Bennett | 5 episodes |
| 2021 | Billions | Brenda | 2 episodes |
| 2022 | Would I Lie to You? | Herself | Episode: "Show Goat" |
| 2022 | The Resort | Jan Knowlston | Recurring role |
| 2022 | Partner Track | Gigi Weaver | Episode: "Meta-Strategy" |
| 2023, 2026 | Ted Lasso | Dottie Lasso | Episodes: "Mom City", "Home" |
| 2024 | The Girls on the Bus | Norah McCarthy | 2 episodes |
| 2024 | Elsbeth | Judith | Episode: "Diamonds Are for Elsbeth" |
| 2024 | The Equalizer | Mrs. Tanner | Episode: "Just Fans" |
| 2025 | Only Murders in the Building | Linda | Episode: "Silver Alert" |
| 2025 | Crutch | Kathy | Episode: "Matchmaker Crutch" |
| 2025 | The Beast in Me | Tessa Baldwin | Episode: "Ghosts" |

=== Theatre ===
| Year | Title | Role | Notes |
|---|---|---|---|
| 1978–1982 | The Best Little Whorehouse in Texas | Various | Jun 1978 – Mar 1982 |
| 1982 | The Best Little Whorehouse in Texas | Doatsey Mae | May 1982 – Jul 1982 |
| 1988 | A Streetcar Named Desire | Eunice Hubbell | Mar 1988 – May 1988 |
| 1990 | The Colorado Catechism | Donna | Oct 1990 – Nov 1990 |
| 1994 | Durang/Durang | Ma / Wanda | Nov 1994 |
| 1995 | Laura Dennis | Lena Abernathy | Mar 1995 – Apr 1995 |
| 1997–1999 | Titanic | Charlotte Cardoza | Apr 1997 – Mar 1999 |
| 1998 | June Moon | Lucille | Jan 1998 – Mar 1998 |
| 1998–1999 | The Most Fabulous Story Ever Told | Jane | Dec 1998 – May 1999 |
| 2001 | The Vagina Monologues | N/A | Feb 2001 – Apr 2001 |
| 2001 | Othello | Emilia | Dec 2001 |
| 2003 | Shanghai Moon | Mrs. Carroll/Sir Geoffrey | Jan 2003 – Mar 2003 |
| 2004 | Assassins | Sara Jane Moore | Apr 2004 – Jul 2004 |
| 2006 | The House in Town | Jean Eliot | Jun 2006 – Jul 2006 |
| 2006–2007 | Suddenly Last Summer | Mrs. Holly | Nov 2006 – Jan 2007 |
| 2008 | Show Boat | Parthy Ann Hawks | Jun 2008 |
| 2008–2009 | All My Sons | Sue Bayliss | Oct 2008 – Jan 2009 |
| 2009 | The Torch-Bearers | Mrs. Ritter | Aug 2009 |
| 2011 | Good People | Jean | Mar 2011 – May 2011 |
| 2012 | Merrily We Roll Along | Mary Flynn | Mar 2012 |
| 2012 | Assassins | Sara Jane Moore | Dec 2012 |
| 2012–2013 | The Great God Pan | Cathy | Dec 2012 – Jan 2013 |
| 2013 | The Comedy of Errors | Abbess | May 2013 – June 2013 |
| 2015 | Barbecue | Lillie Anne | Oct 2015 – Nov 2015 |
| 2015 | Dear Elizabeth | Elizabeth | Oct 2015 – Dec 2015 |
| 2016 | Peer Gynt | The Mother | May 2016 – Jun 2016 |
| 2017 | The Hairy Ape | Mildred's Aunt | Mar 2017 – Apr 2017 |
| 2018 | Cardinal | Nancy Prenchel | Jan 2018 – Feb 2018 |

== Awards and nominations ==
| Year | Association | Category | Project | Result | Ref. |
|---|---|---|---|---|---|
| 1998 | Blockbuster Entertainment Award | Favorite Supporting Actress – Suspense | A Simple Plan | Nominated | |
| 2012 | Critics' Choice Television Award | Best Guest Performer in a Comedy Series | Girls | Nominated | |
| 2015 | Critics' Choice Television Award | Best Guest Performer in a Comedy Series | Girls | Nominated | |
| 2017 | Primetime Emmy Award | Outstanding Guest Actress in a Comedy Series (episode: "Gummies") | Girls | Nominated | |
| 2023 | Primetime Emmy Award | Outstanding Guest Actress in a Comedy Series (episode: "Mom City") | Ted Lasso | Nominated | |
