= Jackson Apple Festival =

Annual food event held in Jackson, Ohio

- Status: Active
- Genre: Food festivals
- Frequency: Third weekend of September
- Location: Jackson, Ohio
- Coordinates: 39°03′04″N 82°38′17″W
- Country: United States
- Inaugurated: 1937
- Organizer: Jackson Area Festivals & Events (JAFE)
- Filing status: 501(c)(3)
- Website: jacksonapplefestival.org

The Jackson Apple Festival, formerly known as the Jackson County Apple Festival, is an annual festival dedicated to the apple held in Jackson, Ohio, United States. The festival was created to promote Jackson County's leading agricultural product, which at the time was grown by over forty farms in the area.

== Dates ==
The Apple Festival is held on the third weekend in September. The festival starts at noon on Tuesday and ends on Saturday night.

== Locations ==
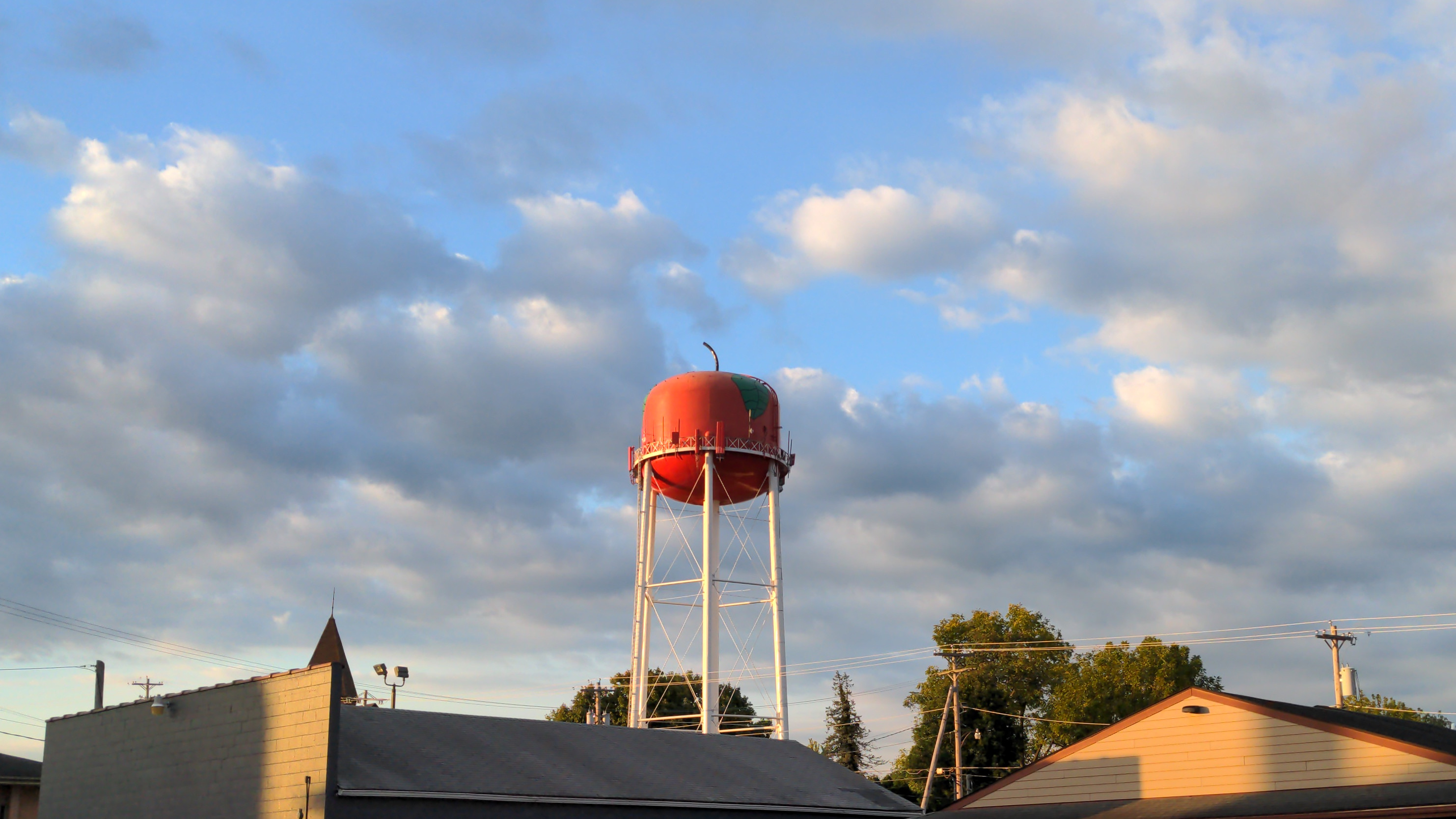
The Apple Water Tower is a Jackson landmark honoring the apple festival.

Starting on the Saturday before the festival, downtown streets (Broadway St. between Water St. and Walnut St.; Main St. between Columbia St. and Portsmouth St.; and Pearl St. between Church St. and Portsmouth St.) are closed in Jackson. They are reopened by 5:00 pm on Sunday.

== History ==
In the spring of 1937, a group of members from the Jackson Chamber of Commerce decided to create a festival that would help promote the county's leading industry.

The Apple Festival has been held annually since 1937, but was silenced from 1942 to 1945 during World War II & 2020 caused by COVID-19 pandemic.

Since 2013, the festival has been run by Jackson Area Festivals & Events (JAFE), a non-profit organization.

== Traditions ==
The Friday night home high-school football game, at Jackson High School during the week of the festival, is dubbed "The Apple Bowl."

Several parades are held during the festival. A school parade is held on Wednesday afternoon. Wednesday evening is the Opening Parade. Thursday at noon is the Pre-School Parade.

The Saturday night "Grande Finale" Parade is the festival's biggest event, with over 70,000 people attending, and has a claim as "the largest lighted parade in Ohio." The parade annually includes local dignitaries and politicians, neighboring festival royalty, and invited high school marching bands from across southern and southeastern Ohio and northern West Virginia; as well as "floats" from each of the elementary schools in and around Jackson, which depict the annual theme of the festival. The Budweiser Clydesdale Horses have been a part of this parade two times during the 1990s. On September 21, 2001, The Ohio State University Marching Band (TBDBITL) performed a halftime field show at the Jackson High School football field, and that night marched in the Festival parade for the first time; the Ohio State Alumni Band has also made several appearances in the parade lineup. The U.S. Marine Corps Band appeared in the 2007 parade.

Another long-standing tradition of the Jackson County Apple Festival is a pageant for the Apple Festival Queen.

== List of Apple Festival Queens ==
- 1937: Jean Clark
- 1938: Alta Swingle
- 1939: Betty Richards
- 1940: Ruth Horton
- 1941: Helen Woodruff

(World War II hiatus)

- 1946: Nancy Schellenger
- 1947: Pat May
- 1948: Ruth Ann Hixon
- 1949: Carolyn Conroy
- 1950: Phyllis Claar
- 1951: Marjorie Downard
- 1952: Shirley Walburn
- 1953: Melva Finch
- 1954: Edna Burton
- 1955: Phyllis Mullins
- 1956: Pat Richards
- 1957: Vivian Patterson
- 1958: Janet Corvin
- 1959: Beverly Varchmin
- 1960: Henrietta Fulton
- 1961: Paula Hess
- 1962: Carolyn Myers
- 1963: Barbara Sergent
- 1964: Janet Simpson
- 1965: Sue Surface
- 1966: Kathy Richards
- 1967: Linda Crabtree
- 1968: Brenda Dalton
- 1969: Lynn Morgan
- 1970: Connie Tucker (became Miss Ohio Festivals)
- 1970: Lin Schneider (replaced Connie Tucker)
- 1971: Jan Russ
- 1972: Drema Crawford
- 1973: Stephanie Davis
- 1974: Iris Wardlow
- 1975: Mary Rupert
- 1976: Noreena Maynard
- 1977: Tammy Baisden
- 1978: Susan Ridge
- 1979: Sheryl Tolliver
- 1980: Jill Martin
- 1981: Sharon Dearing
- 1982: Carla Cooper
- 1983: Lisa Humphreys
- 1984: Barbie Britton
- 1985: Tammy Hill
- 1986: Christina Hill
- 1987: Michelle Tackett
- 1988: Leigh Ann Cox
- 1989: Sarah Sheward
- 1990: Gwen Wood
- 1991: Jodie Brown
- 1992: Susan Moore
- 1993: Christy Warrens
- 1994: Marlana Malone
- 1995: Alicia Parker
- 1996: Bethany Hodge
- 1997: Nicole Fulton
- 1998: Julie Murray
- 1999: Sarah Williamson
- 2000: Kristi Sturgill
- 2001: Jenny Bragg
- 2002: Erikka Jo Alcantara
- 2003: Courtney Wills
- 2004: Rikki Atwood
- 2005: Shara Lahrmer
- 2006: Kayla McMillen
- 2007: Sarah Newkirk
- 2008: Candace Chapman
- 2009: Allyson Seitz
- 2010: Taryn Strawser
- 2011: Karena Fulks
- 2012: JoBeth Winchester
- 2013: Karleigh Atwood
- 2014: Logan Woodyard
- 2015: Maddie Campbell
- 2015: Lexie Webb (replaced Maddie Campbell)
- 2016: Tori Leonard
- 2017: Alyssa Proehl
- 2018: Briley Lusk
- 2019: Madison Strawser

(COVID-19 pandemic hiatus in 2020)

- 2021: Kaydee Brown
- 2022: Abby Donley
- 2023: Abby Plants
- 2024: Isabella Lunsford
- 2025: Tayler Williams

== See also ==
- List of festivals in the United States
