= Henry Murray =

American academic (1893–1988)

- Born: May 13, 1893; New York City, New York, U.S.
- Died: June 23, 1988 (aged 95); Cambridge, Massachusetts, U.S.
- Education: Harvard University (AB); Columbia University (MD, MA); University of Cambridge (PhD)
- Known for: Personality psychology Thematic Apperception Test
- Awards: Bruno Klopfer Award (1967)
- Scientific career
- Fields: Psychology
- Workplaces: Harvard University

Signature
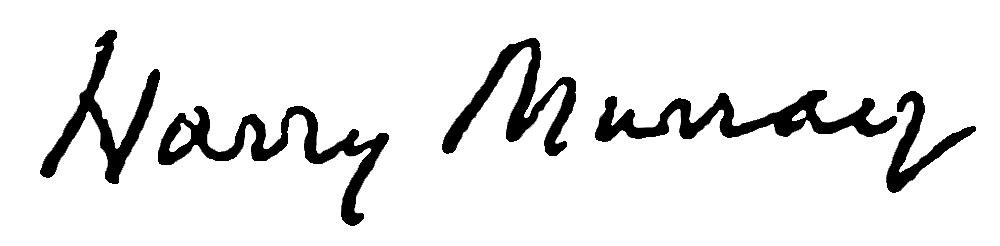

Henry Alexander Murray (May 13, 1893 – June 23, 1988) was an American professor of psychology at Harvard University. Despite no formal training in psychology (Murray was a medical doctor trained in biochemistry), he made several notable contributions to the field. Murray developed the “personology” theory of personality. Murray was also a co-developer, with Christiana Morgan, of the Thematic Apperception Test (TAT), a projective measure of personality widely used for many years.

Murray was invited to join the psychology faculty at Harvard in 1926, serving as Director of the Harvard Psychological Clinic from 1928 until 1937, when he left to work with the U.S. Government during World War II. Murray returned to Harvard after the war ended. In his later years at the university (1959 to 1962), Murray led a series of experiments on how beliefs held up under extreme stress. The experiments have since been recognized as likely unethical due to their psychologically damaging and purposefully abusive nature, along with the use of deception and unclear scientific benefit. One participant in the study was Ted Kaczynski, who later gained infamy as the Unabomber.

== Early life and education ==
Murray was born in New York City into a wealthy family of Henry Alexander Murray Sr. and Fannie Morris Babcock, daughter of financier Samuel Denison Babcock. Murray had an older sister and a younger brother. Carver and Scheier note that "he got on well with his father but had a poor relationship with his mother", resulting in a deep-seated feeling of depression. They hypothesize that the disruption of this relationship led Murray to be especially aware of people's needs and their importance as underlying determinants of behavior.

After Groton School he attended Harvard University, where he majored in history while competing in football, rowing and boxing. His academic pursuits at Harvard were lacking, but at Columbia University he excelled in medicine and completed his M.D. and also received an M.A. in biology in 1919. For the following two years he was an instructor in physiology at Harvard.

He received his doctorate in biochemistry from the University of Cambridge in 1928, aged 35.

In 1916, Murray married at age 23 to Josephine Lee Rantoul. In 1923, after seven years of marriage, he met and fell in love with Christiana Morgan; he experienced a serious conflict as he did not want to leave his wife. This was a turning point in Murray's life as it raised his awareness of conflicting needs, the pressure that can result, and the links to motivation. Carver and Scheier note that it was Morgan who was "fascinated by the psychology of Carl Jung" and it was as a result of her urging that he met Carl Jung in Switzerland. He described Jung as "The first full blooded, spherical—and Goethean, I would say, intelligence I had ever met." He was analyzed by him and studied his works. "The experience of bringing a problem to a psychologist and receiving an answer that seemed to work had a great impact on Murray, leading him to seriously consider psychology as a career".

== Professional career ==
During his period at Harvard, Murray sat in on lectures by Alfred North Whitehead, whose process philosophy marked his philosophical and metaphysical thinking throughout his professional career.

In 1927, at the age of 33, Murray became assistant director of the Harvard Psychological Clinic. He developed the concepts of latent needs (not openly displayed), manifest needs (observed in people's actions), "press" (external influences on motivation) and "thema"—"a pattern of press and need that coalesces around particular interactions".

Murray collaborated with Stanley Cobb, Bullard Professor of Neuropathology at the Medical School, to introduce psychoanalysis into the Harvard curriculum but to keep those who taught it away from the decision-making apparatus in Vienna. He and Cobb set the stage for the founding of the Boston Psychoanalytic Society after 1931, but both were excluded from membership on political grounds.

In 1935, Murray and Morgan developed the concept of apperception and the assumption that everyone's thinking is shaped by subjective processes, the rationale behind the Thematic apperception test. They used the term "apperception" to refer to the process of projecting fantasy imagery onto an objective stimulus.

In 1937, Murray became director of the Harvard Psychological Clinic. In 1938 he published Explorations in Personality, a classic in psychology, which includes a description of the Thematic Apperception Test. In 1938 Murray acted as a consultant for the British Government, setting up the Officer Selection Board. Murray's work at The Harvard Psychological Clinic enabled him to apply his theories in the design of the selection processes with a "situation test", an assessment based on practical tasks and activities, an analysis of specific criteria (e.g. "leadership") by a number of raters across a range of activities. Results were pooled to achieve an overall assessment.

=== World War II, Office of Strategic Services, 1939–1945 ===
During World War II, he left Harvard and worked as lieutenant colonel for the Office of Strategic Services (OSS). James Miller, in charge of the selection of secret agents at the OSS during World War II, said the situation test was used by British War Officer Selection Board and OSS to assess potential agents.

In 1943 Murray helped complete Analysis of the Personality of Adolph Hitler, commissioned by OSS boss Gen. William "Wild Bill" Donovan. The report was done in collaboration with psychoanalyst Walter C. Langer, Ernst Kris, New School for Social Research, and Bertram D. Lewin, New York Psychoanalytic Institute. The report used many sources to profile Hitler, including informants such as Ernst Hanfstaengl, Hermann Rauschning, Princess Stephanie von Hohenlohe, Otto Strasser, Friedelind Wagner, and Kurt Lüdecke. The groundbreaking study was the pioneer of offender profiling and political psychology. In addition to predicting that Hitler would choose suicide if defeat for Germany was near, Murray's collaborative report stated that Hitler was impotent as far as heterosexual relations were concerned and that there was a possibility that Hitler had participated in a homosexual relationship. The report stated: "The belief that Hitler is homosexual has probably developed (a) from the fact that he does show so many feminine characteristics, and (b) from the fact that there were so many homosexuals in the Party during the early days and many continue to occupy important positions. It is probably true that Hitler calls Albert Forster 'Bubi', which is a common nickname employed by homosexuals in addressing their partners."

=== Harvard human experiments, 1959–1962 ===
In 1947, he returned to Harvard as a chief researcher, lectured and established with others the Psychological Clinic Annex.

From late 1959 to early 1962, Murray was responsible for unethical experiments in which he used twenty-two Harvard undergraduates as research subjects. Among other goals, experiments sought to measure individuals' responses to extreme stress. The unwitting undergraduates were submitted to what Murray called "vehement, sweeping and personally abusive" attacks. Specifically tailored assaults to their egos, cherished ideas, and beliefs were used to cause high levels of stress and distress. The subjects then viewed recorded footage of their reactions to this verbal abuse repeatedly.

Among the subjects was 17-year-old Ted Kaczynski, a mathematician who went on to become the domestic terrorist known as the 'Unabomber', who targeted academics and technologists for 17 years. Alston Chase's book Harvard and the Unabomber: The Education of an American Terrorist connects Kaczynski's abusive experiences under Murray to his later criminal career. Kaczynski disputed connections made between Murray's experiments and the Unabomber bombings, stating that throughout the study, he only had one unpleasant experience for just 30 minutes.

In 1960, Timothy Leary started research in psychedelic drugs at Harvard, which Murray is said to have supervised.

Some sources have suggested that Murray's experiments were part of, or indemnified by, the United States government's research into mind control, known as the MKUltra project.

== Retirement and death ==
In 1962, shortly after the death of his wife, Murray became emeritus professor, and earned the Distinguished Scientific Contribution Award from the American Psychological Association and the Gold Medal Award for lifetime achievement from the American Psychological Foundation. He later married Caroline "Nina" Fish, a child psychologist at Boston University and the Massachusetts Mental Health Center, who had been a former student of Jean Piaget.

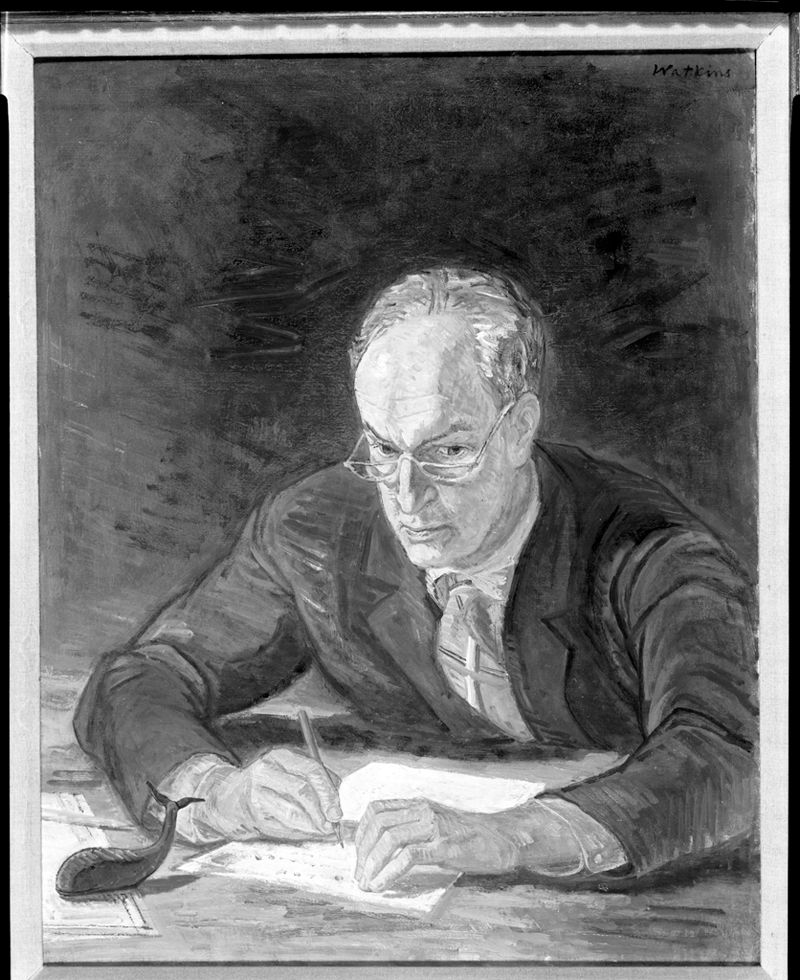
Portrait of Murray by Franklin Chenault Watkins

Murray died from pneumonia at the age of 95.

Murray was a leading authority on the works of American author Herman Melville and amassed a collection of books, manuscripts and artifacts relating to Melville which he donated to the Berkshire Athenaeum in Pittsfield, Massachusetts.

== Personology ==
Murray's Theory of Personality, also called personology, is explained in his book, Explorations in Personality, written in 1938. Murray's system of needs is an important part of the personological system. and developed while personality theory in psychology was becoming dominated by the statistics of trait theory. Personology was a holistic approach that studied the person at many levels of complexity all at the same time by an interdisciplinary team of investigators.

According to Murray's ideas, an individual's personality develops dynamically as each person responds to complex elements in her or his specific environment. Murray viewed an individual's entire life as one unit, and pointed out that although a specific element of a person's life can be studied through psychology, this studied episode gives an incomplete picture of the entire life unit. To properly analyze the entire life cycle, Murray favored a narrative approach to studying personality, which he called "personology". The personological system has been used as an approach for multiple academic disciplines: philosophy, humanism, biological chemistry, and societal and cultural studies.

Murray divided personology into five principles: (1) Cerebral physiology, rooted in the brain, governs all aspects of personality. (2) People act to reduce physiological and psychological tension to gain satisfaction, but do not strive to be tension-free, and rather cycle between seeking excitement, activity and movement in their lives and then relaxing. (3) An individual's personality continues to develop over time and is influenced by all of the events that occur over a person's lifetime. (4) Personality is not fixed and it can change and progress, and (5) Each person has some unique characteristics and others which are shared by everyone.

Murray's theory of personality is rooted in psychoanalysis, and the chief business and aim of personology is the reconstruction of the individual's past life experiences in order to explain their present behavior. To study personality, Murray used free association and dream analysis to bring unconscious material to light. Murray's personality theories have been questioned by some psychologists, and extended by others, such as David McClelland.

== In popular culture ==
Murray was portrayed by Brian d'Arcy James in Manhunt: Unabomber, a 2017 docudrama miniseries created by Andrew Sodroski, Jim Clemente, and Tony Gittelson. In the 2026 feature film Unabomber, Murray is portrayed by Russell Crowe.

== Selected works ==
=== Books ===
- Explorations in Personality, with a foreword by Dan P. McAdams. New York: Oxford University Press (1938); reissue (2008).
- Assessment of Men: Selection of Personnel for the Office of Strategic Service, with OSS Selection Staff. New York: Rinehart (1948).
- Personality in Nature, Society, and Culture, with Clyde Kluckhohn. New York: Knopf (1953).
- Myth and Mythmaking. New York: G. Braziller (1960).

=== Articles ===
- Murray, Henry A. (1933). "The Effect of Fear upon Estimates of the Maliciousness of other Personalities". The Journal of Social Psychology. 4 (3): 310–29. doi:10.1080/00224545.1933.9919325..
- Murray, Henry A. (1935). "Psychology and the University". Archives of Neurology and Psychiatry. 34 (4): 803. doi:10.1001/archneurpsyc.1935.02250220107009..
- Murray, Henry A.; MacKinnon, Donald W. (1946). "Assessment of OSS Personnel" (PDF). Journal of Consulting Psychology. 10 (2): 76–80. doi:10.1037/h0057480.
- "America's Mission" (PDF). Survey Graphic. 37 (10): 411–15. 1948. Full audio.
- Murray, Henry A. (1951). "In Nomine Diaboli" (PDF). New England Quarterly. 24 (4): 435–52. doi:10.2307/361337. JSTOR 361337.
- "Introduction to the Issue 'Myth and Mythmaking.'" (PDF). Daedalus. 88 (2): 211–22. 1959. JSTOR 20026491. Special Issue: Myth and Mythmaking
- Murray, Henry A. (1962). "The Personality and Career of Satan" (PDF). Journal of Social Issues. 18 (4): 36–54. doi:10.1111/j.1540-4560.1962.tb00424.x.
- Murray, Henry A. (1963). "Studies of stressful interpersonal disputations". American Psychologist. 18: 28–36. doi:10.1037/h0045502..

=== Reports ===
- Analysis of the Personality of Adolph Hitler: With Predictions of his Future Behavior and Suggestions for Dealing with Him Now and After Germany's Surrender. Washington: Office of Strategic Services (1943). Full text.
