= Dandelion (2024 film) =

2024 film by Nicole Riegel

- Theatrical release poster
- Directed by: Nicole Riegel
- Written by: Nicole Riegel
- Produced by: Rian Cahill; Adam Cobb; Pete McClellan; Nicole Riegel
- Starring: KiKi Layne; Thomas Doherty; Melanie Nicholls-King; Brady Stablein; Jack Stablein; Grace Kaiser
- Cinematography: Lauren Guiteras
- Edited by: Milena Z. Petrovic
- Music by: Bryce Dessner; Aaron Dessner
- Production companies: IFC Productions; Griffin Drive Productions; Room 252
- Distributed by: IFC Films
- Release dates: March 10, 2024 (SXSW); July 12, 2024 (United States)
- Running time: 113 minutes
- Country: United States
- Language: English
- Box office: $89,433

Dandelion is a 2024 American drama film written and directed by Nicole Riegel. It stars KiKi Layne, Thomas Doherty, Melanie Nicholls-King, Brady Stablein, Jack Stablein, and Grace Kaiser.

It had its world premiere at South by Southwest on March 10, 2024. It was released in the United States on July 12, 2024.

== Premise ==
Dandelion, a singer-songwriter, takes a gig in South Dakota, where she meets Casey, a guitarist.

== Cast ==
- KiKi Layne as Dandelion
- Thomas Doherty as Casey
- Melanie Nicholls-King as Jean
- Brady Stablein
- Jack Stablein
- Grace Kaiser as Grace

== Production ==
In October 2022, KiKi Layne and Thomas Doherty joined the cast of the film, with Nicole Riegel set to direct from a screenplay she wrote and IFC Films set to distribute. Aaron Dessner and Bryce Dessner composed the score for the film and the original music.

Principal photography was concluded by December 2022.

== Release ==
It had its world premiere at South by Southwest on March 10, 2024. It was released in the United States on July 12, 2024.

== Reception ==
On the review aggregator website Rotten Tomatoes, 71% of 21 critics' reviews are positive, with an average rating of 6.4/10.
