= Nicole Riegel =

Nicole Riegel is an American film director, screenwriter, and producer.

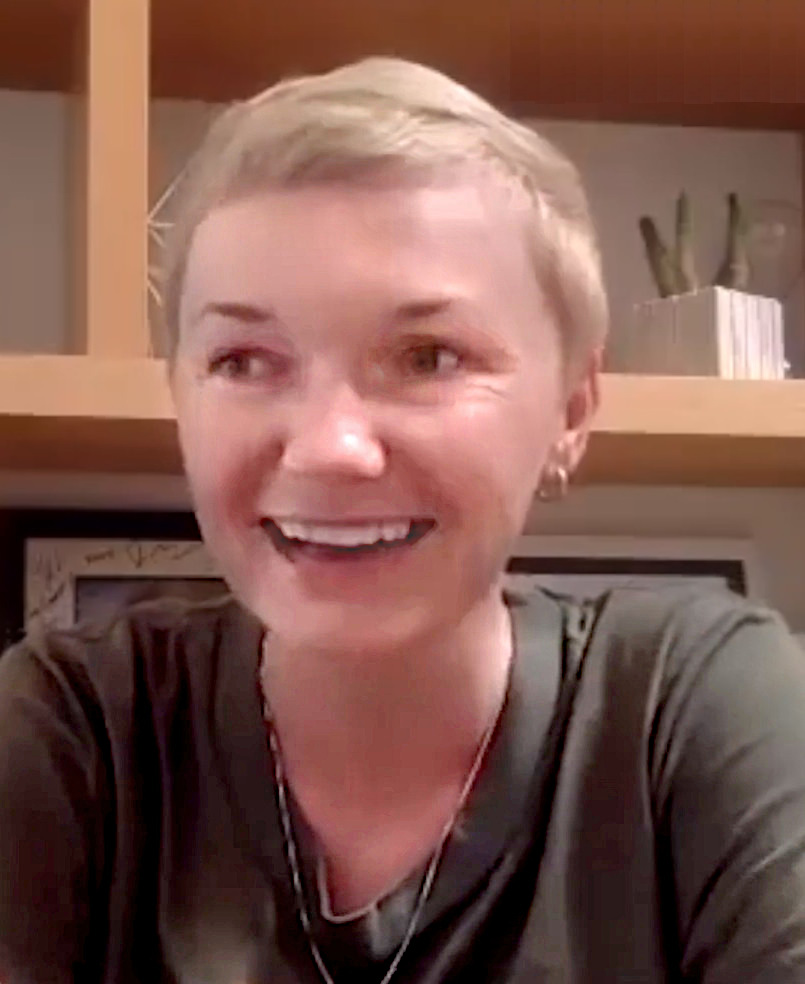
Nicole Riegel in 2021

== Early life and education ==
Riegel grew up in Jackson, Ohio, a town in the Appalachian foothills.. She joined the Army National Guard and was stationed at Fort Jackson, SC. After the military, she attended Wright State University in Dayton, Ohio, where she assisted and studied under acclaimed documentarian Julia Reichert, graduating in 2009. She attended UCLA film school UCLA, graduating with an MFA.

Riegel's first film was Holler (2020), starring Jessica Barden and distributed by IFC Films. The plot follows a seventeen-year-old Appalachian girl growing up in poverty who scavenges scrap metal from local shuttered factories to raise the money she needs to attend college.

IFC Films acquired distribution rights to her second film, Dandelion, which was due to start filming in Cincinnati and South Dakota in late 2022. It had its world premiere at South by Southwest on March 10, 2024 and was released in the United States on July 12, 2024.

== Recognition ==
Riegel was nominated for an Independent Spirit Award for Best First Feature 2021 for her debut film, Holler. She won a National Board of Review Award for Top 10 Independent Films 2021. Filmmaker Magazine named her one of their 25 New Faces of Independent Film in 2014. In 2020, Variety named her one of 10 Directors to Watch. Vulture called her a "major new directorial talent". Variety said Holler "positions Riegel as the Debra Granik of her generation". Holler was set to world premiere at SXSW Film Festival before the festival was cancelled in 2020. Holler premiered later that year internationally at TIFF Toronto International Film Festival and in France at the Deauville Film Festival. The film continued its festival circuit at Leiden Film Festival (Netherlands), Tallinn Black Nights Film Festival (Estonia), Nashville Film Festival, Atlanta Film Festival, Denver Film Festival, Heartland Film Festival.
