= Homer Marshman =

American sports executive (1898–1989)

Homer H. Marshman
- Born: August 3, 1898; Jackson, Ohio
- Died: November 15, 1989 (aged 91); Palm Beach, Florida
- Occupations: Attorney, Businessman, Sports Executive

Homer Marshman (August 3, 1898 – November 15, 1989) was the first owner of the Cleveland Rams, now known as the Los Angeles Rams. Mr. Marshman, a prominent Cleveland, Ohio lawyer and businessman who received his law degree from Harvard School of Law, served as special counsel to Ohio's attorney general from 1934 to 1947. He founded the Rams along with player-coach Damon "Buzz" Wetzel (who was an AlI-America back from Ohio State who had played for the Chicago Bears) in 1936, when it played one successful yet financially disastrous year in the American Football League, then acquired a National Football League franchise for the team on February 13, 1937. Marshman and the other Rams stockholders paid $10,000 for the NFL franchise, then put up $55,000 to capitalize the new club.

In a 1980 interview Homer stated “I never had seen a pro game and was something less than enthusiastic. But I told Wetzel and Thurlow to visit me at my home. I asked some others from Waite Hill to be there too. The result was our formation of a group to back the team. We invited Bill Reynolds, Dave Inglis, Bob Gries, Dean Francis, John F. Patt, Burke Paterson and a few others, all prominent Clevelanders. Each put up $1,000 and (Dan) Hanna and I put up somewhat more. I can’t recall the exact amount. “Buzz was to run the show, serve as coach and player, too. One day, Buzz said, ‘Now we’ve got to come up with a name.’ Reporters from the Plain Dealer and Press were there. I asked the newspapermen for their advice. They agreed it should be a short name, ‘One that would easily fit into a headline,’ they said.“Fordham was a big football school at the time and its nickname was the Rams. One of the writers suggested we use Rams, too. I said to Buzz, ‘We can’t get one shorter than that.’ That settled it. We became the Rams.” The Rams played seven games in its birth year and won five. Not bad. But nobody cared, even if the name was a joy for the headline writers. The Rams played to empty seats. The new American Football League made no impact on the local fans, or fans elsewhere for that matter. To them, there was only one pro league – the established National Football League. At the end of the season, Dan Hanna and I had lunch downtown at the Union Club. He talked about plans for the 1937 season for the Rams. ’Count me out,’ I said. ‘The American League is a failure.’"

The new league was much tougher, however, and the Rams fared poorly on the field. Between 1937 and 1942, the Rams' best finish was third place in the Western Division, with 5 wins and 6 losses in 1942. In June 1941, Marshman and his partners sold the Rams to grocery magnate Daniel Reeves and Frederick Levy Jr. for about $100,000.

In January 1946, after the team finally was successful on the field and just had won the 1945 NFL Championship, Reeves, a New York City native, moved the Rams to Los Angeles. Marshman then became co-owner and secretary of the Cleveland Browns from 1954 to 1962, when he sold his shares in the team to New Yorker Art Modell, who later moved the Browns to Baltimore. This marked the second time Marshman, unintentionally, helped to facilitate out-of-town ownership of a Cleveland NFL team that ultimately left the region. Homer had only purchased 50% of the Cleveland Browns for $300,000 in partnership with a team of Cleveland businessmen led by David R. Jones who financed another $300,000. He reluctantly sold the team to Art Modell for $4.3 million after pressure from partners to turn a large profit.

He owned numerous businesses and also briefly served as president of the Cleveland Indians. He retired to Palm Beach, Florida, in 1970 and was involved with several charities, such as the American Cancer Society. Married twice, first to Beatrice Noyes and then Ina Mae, he was survived by his two sons, Edward and Homer Jr., and one daughter, Jane Guthrie.
