= Christiana Morgan =

American psychoanalyst (1897–1967)

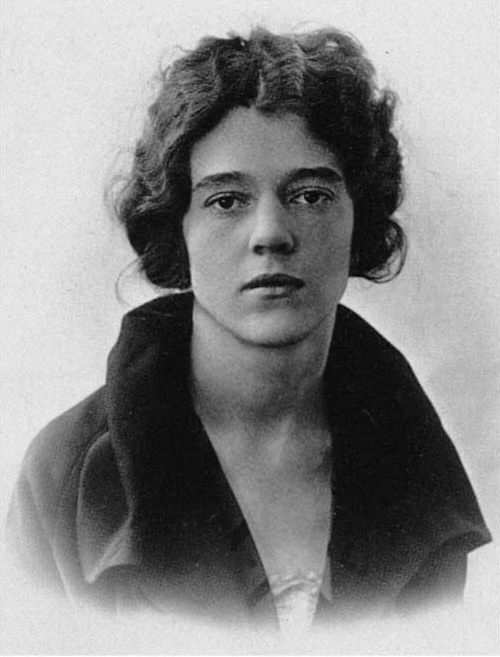
Christiana Morgan, 1926, Morgan Family Papers

Christiana Drummond Morgan (née Councilman; October 6, 1897 – March 14, 1967) was an American lay psychoanalyst, artist, and co-director of the renowned Harvard Psychological Clinic. She is best known for co-authoring the Thematic Apperception Test, one of the most widely used projective psychological tests. Morgan played a crucial yet often overlooked role in the development of 20th-century psychology, particularly through her collaboration with Carl Jung and her pioneering work in Jungian and feminist psychology. Her contributions gained renewed recognition with Claire Douglas's 1993 biography, "Translate This Darkness," and subsequent scholarly interest.

== Early life ==
Christiana Drummond Councilman was born in Boston, Massachusetts, on October 6, 1897. She grew up in an elite Boston family, with her father, William Thomas Councilman, serving as the Shattuck Professor of Pathological Anatomy at Harvard Medical School, and her mother, Isabella, being an established member of Boston society. Christiana attended Miss Winsor's School for Girls in Boston from 1908 to 1914 and later a boarding school in Farmington, Connecticut.

In 1917, Councilman met William Otho Potwin Morgan, who enlisted to fight in World War I. During the war, she trained as a nurse aid at the YWCA in New York City and served during the 1918 flu pandemic. The couple married in 1919, and Morgan gave birth to their only child, Peter Councilman Morgan, in 1920. Part of the Introvert/Extrovert Club in New York City in the 1920s, she traveled to Zurich to consult Carl Jung. In 1921, she had an affair with the Zionist leader Chaim Weizmann, after meeting him at a fundraising dinner, and considered getting a divorce and converting to Judaism, if Weizmann left his wife. From 1921 to 1924, Morgan studied art at the Art Students League of New York, developing her skills in painting, wood carving, and sculpture.

In 1923, she met and fell in love with Henry (Harry) Murray, then biochemist at Rockefeller University NY, later psychology professor at Harvard University. Murray had been married for seven years and did not want to leave his wife. As Murray experienced a serious conflict, Morgan advised him to visit Jung. In 1927, they visited Jung in Zürich, and upon his advice became lovers "to unlock their unconscious and their creativity".

Despite the societal constraints on women's education at the time, Morgan became self-taught and later served as co-director, researcher, and lay analyst at the Harvard Psychological Clinic. Her early career involved volunteering as a nurse during World War I and the 1918 pandemic, experiences that deeply influenced her later work in psychology.

== Visions & Working With Carl Jung ==
Morgan's work with Carl Jung was important both to her life and the development of Jungian psychology. In 1926, she traveled to Zurich to be pscyhoanalysed by Jung. Her inner world manifested in archetypal visions, which she translated into drawings chronicling her archetypal encounters in her quest for psychological integration. Over nine months, she produced hundreds of these visions, which Jung used extensively in his "Visions Seminars" from 1930 to 1934. Jung considered her a "pioneer woman" and manifestation of the perfect feminine (une femme inspiratrice), and a crucial source of material for his theories on the archetypal basis of the unconscious.

Morgan's visions and her work with Jung provided a significant methodological and conceptual framework for exploring the feminine unconscious. Her contributions were instrumental in developing Jung's theories, particularly regarding the anima and the use of active imagination in therapy. Despite Jung's admiration, he struggled to see how a woman of her time could be the primary creative force and came to view her role as that of a muse to powerful men, a perception that overshadowed her substantial intellectual contributions.

== Harvard Psychological Clinic and Thematic Apperception Test ==
Upon returning to the United States in 1926, Morgan joined Henry (Harry) Murray at the Harvard Psychological Clinic. Together, they co-directed the clinic—following Morton Prince’s death—helping to establish it as a central institution in 20th-century American psychology. In 1934, their collaboration produced the Thematic Apperception Test, a projective test that remains widely used today.

The test consists of a series of pictures shown to a person who is asked to make up a story about each picture; in its early development, many of Morgan's own drawings were included. She was first author with Henry (Harry) Murray in the first publication of the test, and as late as 1941 the test was known as the "Morgan-Murray Thematic Apperception Test" . When the current version of the test was published by the Harvard University Press in 1943, authorship was attributed only to "Henry A. Murray, M.D., and the Staff of the Harvard Psychological Clinic." As it was further developed, Morgan's pictures were taken out as well as her co-authorship, and her contributions were largely forgotten. Murray stated in 1985, "Morgan asked to have her name removed as senior author of the 1943/1971 TAT because she disliked the obligation of making the academic responses".

Morgan administered one of the earliest versions of the test to one of the first diagnosed anorexic patients in Boston.

At the clinic, Morgan and Murray conducted pioneering research on personality and the imagination, influencing generations of psychologists. Despite the erasure of her name from the Thematic Apperception Test, Morgan significantly impacted the fields of depth psychology and feminist psychology. Her primary biographer, Dr. Claire Douglas, highlighted Morgan's vision of a female self that challenged male-invented definitions, contributing to a third force in psychology that bridged Freudian and behaviorist approaches.

== The Tower On The Marsh ==
Inspired by Jung's Bollingen Tower, Morgan built "The Tower on the Marsh" in Newbury, Massachusetts, as a retreat for her art and psychological research. Constructed with the help of local carpenter Kenneth Knight, the tower became a symbolic representation of Morgan's individuation journey. Filled with her carvings, paintings, and stained-glass windows, the tower embodies her exploration of the unconscious and her intellectual and sexual relationship with Henry (Harry) Murray.

The tower served as a place for meditation, creativity, and the study of psychological transformation. Its construction and decoration were deeply personal, reflecting Morgan's spiritual and intellectual quests.

== Death ==
Morgan drowned at the age of 69 in two feet of water while vacationing with her longtime collaborator and romantic partner, Dr. Henry Murray at Denis Bay, Saint John, U.S. Virgin Islands on March 14, 1967. Because of Murray's conflicting accounts, the circumstances of her death remain unclear, with some suggesting it may have been a suicide.

== Legacy ==
Christiana Morgan's name isn't well known, but her influence on the field of psychology is legion. She sits in the background as a founder of American psychology through her decades at the Harvard Psychological Clinic (with Henry Murray), and the mind behind the commonly used Thematic Apperception Test—one of the most widely used projective psychological tests to date—and in the scholarship of Jungian psychology as the only subject of Carl Jung’s Visions Seminars that spanned four years. And yet, her name has since been removed from the authorship of the psychological test and she was never named in Jung’s original lectures. As a female scholar of her time, Christiana has been most frequently known as “anonymous” or had her work disappeared entirely and credited to the name of a male colleague.

The tower on the Marsh in Massachusetts is the central location for her work. It houses her books along with a variety of artistic creations, including wood carvings, stained-glass windows, and hand-painted mandalas. These works reflect her creative approach, making the tower a place where different aspects of her writing and art are brought together.

== In popular culture ==
Morgan was portrayed in the 2026 Netflix film Unabomber by actress Annabelle Wallis who, at 42, is twenty years younger than Morgan was in 1959 when the film picks up with Ted Kaczynski’s time as a student at Harvard.
