= Holler (film) =

- Official release poster
- Directed by: Nicole Riegel
- Written by: Nicole Riegel
- Produced by: Adam Cobb; Rachel Gould; Katie McNeill; Jamie Patricof; Christy Spitzer Thornton
- Starring: Jessica Barden; Becky Ann Baker; Pamela Adlon; Gus Halper; Austin Amelio
- Cinematography: Dustin Lane
- Edited by: Kate Hickey
- Music by: Gene Beck
- Production companies: Hunting Lane Films; Level Forward; Feigco Entertainment
- Distributed by: IFC Films
- Release dates: September 8, 2020 (Deauville); June 11, 2021 (United States)
- Running time: 90 minutes
- Country: United States
- Language: English
- Box office: $28,706

Holler is a 2020 American drama film written and directed by Nicole Riegel in her feature directorial debut. It stars Jessica Barden, Becky Ann Baker, Pamela Adlon, Gus Halper and Austin Amelio. Paul Feig serves as an executive producer under his Feigco Entertainment banner.

Holler had its world premiere at the Deauville American Film Festival on September 8, 2020, and was theatrically released in the United States on June 11, 2021.

== Plot ==
A young woman joins a dangerous scrap metal crew in order to pay her way to college. With her goal in sight, she realizes the ultimate cost for education is more than she bargained for, and finds herself torn between a promising future and a family she would be leaving behind.

== Cast ==
- Jessica Barden as Ruth
- Gus Halper as Blaze
- Austin Amelio as Hark, a junkyard owner who sells metal scraps overseas
- Becky Ann Baker as Linda, a friend of Ruth and Blaze who works at a factory
- Pamela Adlon as Rhonda, drug addicted mother of Blaze and Ruth
- Myesha Butler as Desiree, Blaze's girlfriend

== Release ==
The film had its world premiere at the Deauville American Film Festival on September 8, 2020. It also screened at the 2020 Toronto International Film Festival as part of TIFF Industry Selects on September 9, 2020. Initially the film was set to world premiere at South by Southwest in March 2020, however, the festival was cancelled due to the COVID-19 pandemic. In February 2021, IFC Films acquired distribution rights to the film. It was released on June 11, 2021.

== Critical reception ==
On the review aggregator website Rotten Tomatoes, 91% of 67 critics' reviews are positive, with an average rating of 7/10. The website's critical consensus reads, "It's hard not to hear echoes of similarly desperate stories, but Holler drowns them out with strong performances and palpable empathy." Metacritic, which uses a weighted average, assigned the film a score of 76 out of 100, based on 16 critics, indicating "generally favorable" reviews.
