= James A. Rhodes Airport =

Public use airport in Jackson, Ohio

James A Rhodes Airport
- IATA: none; ICAO: KJRO; FAA LID: JRO

Summary
- Owner/Operator: Jackson County Commissioners
- Serves: Jackson, Ohio
- Location: Jackson County, Ohio
- Opened: 1968
- Time zone: UTC−05:00 (-5)
  - Summer (DST): UTC−04:00 (-4)
- Elevation AMSL: 726 ft (221 m)
- Coordinates: 38°58′55″N 082°34′40″W

Map
- Location of airport in Ohio JRO (the United States)

Runways
Direction	Length		Surface
Direction	ft	m	Surface
01/19	5,201	1,585	Asphalt

Statistics (2021)
- Aircraft operations: 6,032
- Source: Federal Aviation Administration

The James A. Rhodes Airport (ICAO: KJRO, FAA LID: JRO) is a publicly owned, public use airport located 5 miles southeast of Jackson in Jackson County, Ohio.

Most airports share the same code from IATA and the FAA. However, Rhodes Airport is assigned JRO by the FAA but not by IATA, who assigned JRO to Kilimanjaro International Airport.

The airport hosts regular social and community events, like fly-ins.

== History ==
The airport was made possible when Governor James Rhodes passed a bill providing funding for each county in Ohio to have an airport. The owner of an existing airstrip, E. E. Evans, offered to donate his facility and approximately 58 acres (23 ha) land in early March 1966 with the condition that the new airport be named James A. Rhodes Airport. Construction on the airport had begun by late June 1967. A construction contractor attempted to obtain an injunction in mid October 1967 to prevent the airport from opening as his costs had exceeded the initial quote. It was dedicated on 20 October 1968. At the time, it had a 4,000 ft (1,200 m) runway, three hangars, eight tie-downs, a fuel tank and an office. By the following February, it was being used by the R. J. Reynolds Food Company, the 7-Up Bottling Company, Goodyear Aerospace and Ralston Purina. The airport received an additional $50,000 from the state in 1971 for facility improvements.

The airport's 50-year anniversary was celebrated in 2018. The airport was celebrated with a re-dedication in 2019.

== Facilities and aircraft ==
The airport has one runway, designated as runway 1/19. It measures 5201 x 75 ft (1585 x 23 m) and is paved with asphalt. For the 12-month period ending September 20, 2021, the airport had 6,032 airport operations, an average of 116 per week. It consisted of 83% general aviation, 12% air taxi, and 5% military. For the same time period, 20 aircraft were based at the airport: 18 single-engine airplanes, 1 jet airplane, and 1 helicopter.

The airport has a fixed-base operator that sells fuel, both avgas and jet fuel. Amenities include things such as a pilot lounge, a conference room, and more. The airport received over $500,000 in 2014 to upgrade facilities, including its terminal.

== Accidents and incidents ==
- On April 26, 2003, a Beech A36 Bonanza was substantially damaged when it impacted trees during a descent after takeoff from James A. Rhodes Airport. The accident flight occurred during a Beechcraft Pilot Proficiency Program. According to the president of the program, the purpose of the program was to pair pilot/owners of Beechcraft airplanes with instructors for the purpose of ground and flight training. Witnesses reported seeing the airplane in the pattern at James A. Rhodes and said the pilot reported inbound on an instrument approach to the airport. After landing, the pilots announced they would be performing a "simulated emergency landing" after takeoff. The takeoff appeared normal, smooth, and level; the airplane was in a nose-up attitude until about 1,200 feet above the ground, at which point it pitched down and impacted trees. The probable cause of the accident was found to be the flight instructor's improper decision to turn back to the airport at an insufficient altitude after takeoff and his failure to maintain adequate airspeed during a simulated engine failure.
- On August 14, 2004, an Aero Commander 112 experienced a forced landing after departure from James A. Rhodes Airport. The pilot reported they initiated a right turn to avoid rising terrain, but the airplane's engine subsequently stopped producing power. The pilot subsequently picked a pasture on which to land the airplane. The cause of the loss of engine power could not be determined.
- On February 28, 2024, a Piper PA-32 Cherokee Six crashed in poor weather after departing from the James A. Rhodes the airport. The pilot, who was receiving training towards an instrument rating at the time of the crash, entered low clouds and snow soon after taking off; witnesses at the airport reported the airport was in the clouds after reaching the end of the airport's runway. The accident is under investigation.

== See also ==
- List of airports in Ohio
